= 1971 Detroit Lions season =

NFL team season

- Head coach: Joe Schmidt
- Home stadium: Tiger Stadium

Results
- Record: 7–6–1
- Division place: 2nd NFC Central
- Playoffs: Did not qualify

The 1971 Detroit Lions season was their 42nd in the league. The team failed to improve on their previous season's output of 10–4, winning only seven games.

Mired in adversity, the 1971 season turned especially tragic for the Lions and the NFL when, during their week 6 game hosting the Chicago Bears, wide receiver Chuck Hughes collapsed on the playing field. Unresponsive, Hughes was pronounced dead later that day of heart failure. Since 1971, no Detroit player has worn Hughes' #85 jersey, save by special permission of the Hughes family, although his number 85 is not officially retired by the Lions.

== Offseason ==
=== NFL draft ===
1971 Detroit Lions draft
Round	Pick	Player	Position	College	Notes
1	21	Bob Bell	DT	Cincinnati	
2	30	Dave Thompson	C	Clemson	from Philadelphia
2	48	Charlie Weaver	LB	USC	
3	72	Al Clark	CB	Eastern Michigan	
4	100	Larry Woods	DT	Tennessee State	
5	125	Pete Newell	G	Michigan	
6	150	Frank Harris	QB	Boston College	from Philadelphia
6	152	Herman Franklin	WR	USC	
7	177	Brownie Wheless	OT	Rice	
8	204	Ken Lee	LB	Washington	
9	229	Mickey Zofko	RB	Auburn	
11	281	Phil Webb	DB	Colorado State	
12	308	Bill Pilconis	WR	Pittsburgh	
13	332	David Abercrombie	RB	Tulane	
14	360	Tom Lorenz	TE	Iowa State	
15	385	Ed Coates	WR	Central Missouri	
16	411	Tom Kutchinski	S	Michigan State	
17	436	Gordon Jolley	OT	Utah	
Made roster * Made at least one Pro Bowl during career

Notes

- Detroit traded QB Greg Barton to Philadelphia in exchange for the Eagles' second-round selection (30th) and second- and third-round selections in 1972.
- Detroit traded DE Denis Moore to Philadelphia in exchange for the Eagles' sixth-round selection (150th).
- Detroit traded its tenth-round selection (256th) to Philadelphia in exchange for DB Len Persin.

== Personnel ==
=== Staff / coaches ===
1971 Detroit Lions staff
Front office: Owner - William Clay Ford, Sr.; Vice president / general manager - Russ Thomas; Executive vice president - Edwin J. Anderson; Treasurer - Newton S. Peters; Publicity director / business manager - Lyall Smith; Assistant publicity director - Elliott Trumbull; Equipment manager - Roy Marklem; Assistant equipment manager - Charles "Rip" Collins; Head coaches: Head coach – Joe Schmidt; Offensive coaches: Offensive coordinator / backs - Bill McPeak; Offensive line - Chuck Knox; Wide receivers - Johnny North	Defensive coaches: Defensive coordinator / secondary - Jim David; Defensive line / linebackers - Jim Martin; Strength and conditioning: Trainer - Kent Falb; Assistant trainer - Dave Smith

=== Roster ===
1971 Detroit Lions final roster
Quarterbacks: 11 Greg Landry; 19 Bill Munson; Running backs: 24 Mel Farr; 36 Steve Owens; 42 Altie Taylor; 38 Bill Triplett; 34 Mickey Zofko; Wide receivers: 86 Al Barnes; 89 Ron Jessie; 25 Earl McCullouch; 49 Larry Walton; Tight ends: 87 Craig Cotton; 88 Charlie Sanders	Offensive linemen: 54 Ed Flanagan C; 76 Rocky Freitas T; 68 Frank Gallagher G; 66 Bob Kowalkowski G; 79 Ray Parson T; 65 Dave Thompson T; 71 Chuck Walton G; 75 Jim Yarbrough T; Defensive linemen: 73 Bob Bell DT; 74 Larry Hand DE; 83 Jim Mitchell DE; 84 Joe Robb DE; 82 Jerry Rush DT; 70 Larry Woods DT	Linebackers: 51 Ken Lee MLB; 53 Mike Lucci MLB; 62 Ed Mooney OLB; 50 Paul Naumoff OLB; 55 Wayne Walker OLB; 59 Charlie Weaver OLB; Defensive backs: 20 Lem Barney CB; 21 Al Clark CB; 47 Wayne Rasmussen FS; 28 Mike Weger SS; 45 Bobby Williams CB; Special teams: 12 Errol Mann K; 18 Herman Weaver P	Reserve lists: 81 Charlie Brown WR (IR); 52 Bill Cottrell C (NF-Ill.); 40 Nick Eddy RB (IR); 77 Dick Evey DT (IR); 23 Paul Gipson RB (IR); -- Tom Kutschinski S (IR); 44 Dick LeBeau CB (IR); 48 Tom Vaughn S (IR); -- Brownie Wheless T (NF-Ill.); Taxi Squad: 17 Bill Cappleman QB; 64 Gordon Jolley T; -- Manuel Murrell CB; 67 Rocky Rasley G; _{40 active, 9 reserve, 4 practice / taxi squad} rookies in italics

== Schedule ==
Week	Date	Opponent	Result	Record	Venue	Attendance
1	September 20	**Minnesota Vikings**	**L** 13–16	0–1	Tiger Stadium	54,418
2	September 26	at New England Patriots	**W** 34–7	1–1	Schaefer Stadium	61,057
3	October 3	Atlanta Falcons	**W** 41–38	2–1	Tiger Stadium	54,418
4	October 10	**Green Bay Packers**	**W** 31–28	3–1	Tiger Stadium	54,418
5	October 17	at Houston Oilers	**W** 31–7	4–1	Astrodome	45,885
6	October 24	**Chicago Bears**	**L** 23–28	4–2	Tiger Stadium	54,418
7	November 1	at **Green Bay Packers**	**T** 14–14	4–2–1	Milwaukee County Stadium	47,961
8	November 7	at Denver Broncos	**W** 24–20	5–2–1	Mile High Stadium	51,200
9	November 14	Los Angeles Rams	**L** 13–21	5–3–1	Tiger Stadium	54,418
10	November 21	at **Chicago Bears**	**W** 28–3	6–3–1	Soldier Field	55,049
11	November 25	Kansas City Chiefs	**W** 32–21	7–3–1	Tiger Stadium	54,418
12	December 5	Philadelphia Eagles	**L** 20–23	7–4–1	Tiger Stadium	54,418
13	December 11	at **Minnesota Vikings**	**L** 10–29	7–5–1	Metropolitan Stadium	49,784
14	December 19	at San Francisco 49ers	**L** 27–31	7–6–1	Candlestick Park	45,580

Note: Intra-division opponents are in bold text.

=== Standings ===
NFC Central
	W	L	T	PCT	DIV	CONF	PF	PA	STK
Minnesota Vikings	11	3	0	.786	5–1	9–2	245	139	W2
Detroit Lions	7	6	1	.538	2–3–1	3–6–1	341	286	L2
Chicago Bears	6	8	0	.429	2–4	5–6	185	276	L5
Green Bay Packers	4	8	2	.333	2–3–1	2–7–2	274	298	L1

Note: Tie games were not officially counted in the standings until 1972.

=== Season summary ===
==== Week 6 ====
Week Six: Chicago Bears (3–2) at Detroit Lions (4–1)

Quarter	1	2	3	4	Total
**Bears**	7	14	0	7	**28**
Lions	6	14	3	0	**23**

at Tiger Stadium, Detroit, Michigan

- Date: October 24, 1971
- Game time: 2:00 p.m. EST
- Game weather: 60 °F (16 °C)
- Game attendance: 54,418
- Pro-Football-Reference.com

Game information

**First quarter**

- DET – Errol Mann 28-yard field goal. Lions 3–0. Drive:
- CHI – Don Shy 21-yard run (Mac Percival kick). Bears 7–3. Drive:
- DET – Errol Mann 49-yard field goal. Bears 7–6. Drive:

**Second quarter**

- CHI – George Farmer 54-yard pass from Bobby Douglass (Mac Percival kick). Bears 14–6. Drive:
- DET – Ron Jessie 102-yard kickoff return (Errol Mann kick). Bears 14–13.
- DET – Larry Walton 16-yard pass from Greg Landry (Errol Mann kick). Lions 20–14. Drive:
- CHI – Bob Wallace 15-yard pass from Bobby Douglass (Mac Percival kick). Bears 21–20. Drive:

**Third quarter**

- DET – Errol Mann 29-yard field goal. Lions 23–21. Drive:

**Fourth quarter**

- CHI – Bobby Douglass 1-yard run (Mac Percival kick). Bears 28–23. Drive:

Top passers

- CHI – Bobby Douglass – 15/21, 160 yards, 2 TD
- DET – Greg Landry – 11/26, 173 yards, TD, 2 INT

Top rushers

- CHI – Don Shy – 18 rushes, 99 yards, TD
- DET – Steve Owens – 16 rushes, 81 yards

Top receivers

- CHI – George Farmer – 6 receptions, 95 yards, TD
- DET – Altie Taylor – 4 receptions, 41 yards

Chuck Hughes became the first NFL player to die on the field during a game.
