= 1972 Detroit Lions season =

NFL team season

- Head coach: Joe Schmidt

Results
- Record: 8–5–1
- Division place: 2nd NFC Central
- Playoffs: Did not qualify

The 1972 Detroit Lions season was their 43rd in the National Football League (NFL). The team improved on their previous season's output of 7–6–1, winning eight games. The team missed the playoffs for the second straight season. It would also be the team's last winning season until 1980

Linebacker Wayne Walker established a new team record for games played at 200. It was also the final season for longtime defensive back Dick LeBeau.

== Offseason ==
=== NFL draft ===
1972 Detroit Lions draft
| Round | Pick | Player | Position | College | Notes |
| 1 | 16 | Herb Orvis | DE | Colorado | |
| 3 | 65 | Ken Sanders | DE | Howard Payne | from Philadelphia |
| 6 | 145 | Charlie Potts | DB | Purdue | |
| 7 | 172 | Charles Stoudmire | WR | Portland State | |
| 8 | 197 | Henry Stuckey | DB | Missouri | |
| 9 | 224 | Bill McClintock | DB | Drake | |
| 10 | 249 | Jim Teal | LB | Purdue | |
| 11 | 276 | Bob Waldron | DT | Tulane | |
| 12 | 301 | Paul Bradley | WR | SMU | |
| 13 | 328 | John Kirschner | TE | Memphis State | |
| 14 | 353 | Eric Kelley | OT | Whitworth | |
| 15 | 380 | Steve Roach | LB | Kansas | |
| 16 | 405 | Leon Jenkins | DB | West Virginia | |
| 17 | 432 | Mike Tyler | DB | Rice | |
Made roster * Made at least one Pro Bowl during career

Notes

- Detroit traded QB Greg Barton to Philadelphia in exchange for the Eagles' second- and third-round selections (40th and 65th) and second-round selection in 1971.
- Detroit traded the 40th selection received from Philadelphia to Atlanta in exchange for RB Paul Gipson.
- Detroit traded its second-round selection (41st) to Atlanta in exchange for CB Rudy Redmond, RB Sonny Campbell and Atlanta's fourth-round selection in 1973.
- Detroit traded its third-round selection (68th) to Philadelphia in exchange for QB Bill Cappleman.
- Detroit traded its fourth-round selection (93rd) to Dallas in exchange for WR Ron Jessie.
- Detroit traded its fifth-round selection (120th) to Los Angeles in exchange for DT Dick Evey.

== Personnel ==
=== Staff / Coaches ===
1972 Detroit Lions staff
| Front office: Owner - William Clay Ford, Sr.; Vice President / General manager - Russ Thomas; Executive Vice President - Edwin J. Anderson; Treasurer - Newton S. Peters; Publicity Director / Business Manager - Lyall Smith; Assistant Publicity Director - Elliott Trumbull; Equipment manager - Roy Marklem; Assistant equipment manager - Charles "Rip" Collins; Head coaches: Head coach – Joe Schmidt; Offensive coaches: Offensive Coordinator / Backs - Bill McPeak; Offensive Line - Chuck Knox; Wide Receivers - Johnny North | Defensive coaches: Defensive Coordinator / Secondary - Jim David; Defensive Line / Linebackers / Special teams - Jim Martin; Strength and conditioning: Trainer - Kent Falb; Assistant Trainer - Dave Smith |

=== Final roster ===
1972 Detroit Lions roster
| Quarterbacks: 11 Greg Landry; 19 Bill Munson; Running backs: 40 Nick Eddy; 24 Mel Farr; 42 Altie Taylor; 38 Bill Triplett; 34 Mickey Zofko; Wide receivers: 86 Al Barnes; 89 Ron Jessie; 25 Earl McCullouch; 49 Larry Walton; Tight ends: 87 Craig Cotton; 88 Charlie Sanders | Offensive linemen: 54 Ed Flanagan C; 76 Rocky Freitas T; 68 Frank Gallagher G; 58 Gene Hamlin C; 64 Gordon Jolley T; 66 Bob Kowalkowski G; 67 Rocky Rasley G; 71 Chuck Walton G; Defensive linemen: 73 Bob Bell DT; 74 Larry Hand DE; 83 Jim Mitchell DE; 80 Herb Orvis DT; 82 Ken Sanders DE; 71 Bob Tatarek DT | Linebackers: 53 Mike Lucci MLB; 50 Paul Naumoff OLB; 55 Wayne Walker OLB; 59 Charlie Weaver OLB; 51 Adrian Young MLB; Defensive backs: 20 Lem Barney CB; 44 Dick LeBeau FS; 27 Charlie Potts SS; 45 Al Randolph FS; 46 Rudy Redmond CB; 28 Mike Weger FS; Special teams: 12 Errol Mann K; 18 Herman Weaver P | Reserve lists: 48 Sonny Campbell RB (IR); 62 Ed Mooney LB (IR); 36 Steve Owens RB (IR); 47 Wayne Rasmussen S (IR); 84 Joe Schmiesing DT (IR); 57 Jim Teal LB (IR); 65 Dave Thompson C (IR); 72 Larry Woods DT (IR); 75 Jim Yarbrough T (IR); Taxi Squad: 17 Bill Cappleman QB; 77 John Gordon DT; 81 John Hilton TE; 31 Leon Jenkins CB; 21 Jim Thrower S; _{40 active, 9 reserve, 5 practice / taxi squad} rookies in italics |

== Schedule ==
| Week | Date | Opponent | Result | Attendance |
|---|---|---|---|---|
| 1 | September 17 | New York Giants | W 30–16 | 54,418 |
| 2 | September 24 | Minnesota Vikings | L 10-34 | 54,418 |
| 3 | October 1 | at Chicago Bears | W 38–24 | 55,701 |
| 4 | October 8 | at Atlanta Falcons | W 26–23 | 58,850 |
| 5 | October 16 | Green Bay Packers | L 23-24 | 54,418 |
| 6 | October 22 | San Diego Chargers | W 34–20 | 54,371 |
| 7 | October 30 | at Dallas Cowboys | L 24-28 | 65,378 |
| 8 | November 5 | Chicago Bears | W 14–0 | 54,418 |
| 9 | November 12 | at Minnesota Vikings | L 14-16 | 49,784 |
| 10 | November 19 | New Orleans Saints | W 27–14 | 53,752 |
| 11 | November 23 | New York Jets | W 37–20 | 54,418 |
| 12 | December 3 | at Green Bay Packers | L 7-33 | 56,263 |
| 13 | December 10 | at Buffalo Bills | T 21–21 | 41,583 |
| 14 | December 17 | at Los Angeles Rams | W 34–17 | 71,761 |

== Season summary ==
=== Week 13 at Bills ===
Week Thirteen: Detroit Lions (7–5) at Buffalo Bills (3–9)

| Quarter | 1 | 2 | 3 | 4 | Total |
|---|---|---|---|---|---|
| Lions | 0 | 7 | 7 | 7 | 21 |
| Bills | 0 | 7 | 7 | 7 | 21 |

at War Memorial Stadium, Buffalo, New York

- Date: December 10
- Game time: 1:00 p.m. EST
- Game weather: 32 °F (0 °C)
- Game attendance: 41,583
- Box Score

Game information

First quarter

- No scoring

Second quarter

- DET – Earl McCullouch 9-yard pass from Greg Landry (Errol Mann kick). Lions 7–0. Drive:
- BUF – J.D. Hill 58-yard pass from Dennis Shaw (John Leypoldt kick). Tie 7–7. Drive:

Third quarter

- BUF – Bob Chandler 39-yard pass from Dennis Shaw (John Leypoldt kick). Bills 14–7. Drive:
- DET – Nick Eddy 36-yard pass from Greg Landry (Errol Mann kick). Tie 14–14. Drive:

Fourth quarter

- BUF – Jan White 2-yard pass from Dennis Shaw (John Leypoldt kick). Bills 21–14. Drive:
- DET – Ron Jessie 37-yard pass from Greg Landry (Errol Mann kick). Tie 21–21. Drive:

Top passers

- DET – Greg Landry – 8/25, 150 yards, 3 TD
- BUF – Dennis Shaw – 18/32, 239 yards, 3 TD

Top rushers

- DET – Greg Landry – 9 rushes, 46 yards
- BUF – O.J. Simpson – 27 rushes, 116 yards

Top receivers

- DET – Ron Jessie – 2 receptions, 51 yards, TD
- BUF – J.D. Hill – 8 receptions, 129 yards, TD

== Standings ==
NFC Central
| | W | L | T | PCT | DIV | CONF | PF | PA | STK |
|---|---|---|---|---|---|---|---|---|---|
| Green Bay Packers | 10 | 4 | 0 | .714 | 5–1 | 8–3 | 304 | 226 | W3 |
| Detroit Lions | 8 | 5 | 1 | .607 | 2–4 | 6–5 | 339 | 290 | W1 |
| Minnesota Vikings | 7 | 7 | 0 | .500 | 4–2 | 6–5 | 301 | 252 | L2 |
| Chicago Bears | 4 | 9 | 1 | .321 | 1–5 | 3–7–1 | 225 | 275 | L1 |

== See also ==
- 1972 in Michigan
