= 1970 Detroit Lions season =

NFL team season

- Head coach: Joe Schmidt
- Home stadium: Tiger Stadium

Results
- Record: 10–4
- Division place: 2nd NFC Central
- Playoffs: Lost Divisional Playoffs (at Cowboys) 0–5

The 1970 Detroit Lions season was the 41st season in franchise history. With a record of 10–4, their best in eight years, the Lions finished in second place in the NFC Central and qualified for the playoffs as the NFC's first ever Wildcard team. Detroit made the postseason for the first time since their championship season in 1957 (they played in three post-season runner-up games (Playoff Bowl) in 1960, 1961, and 1962 and won all three).

One unusual loss during the regular season was at New Orleans in Week 8. The Lions led by a point with only two seconds left, but Saints kicker Tom Dempsey booted a then-record 63-yard field goal as time expired to give the Saints a 19–17 win.

In the divisional round of the playoffs at the Cotton Bowl, the Lions fell 5–0 to the Dallas Cowboys in the lowest scoring game in NFL playoff history, and the first without a touchdown in twenty years.

== Offseason ==
=== NFL draft ===
1970 Detroit Lions draft
Round	Pick	Player	Position	College	Notes
1	19	Steve Owens *	Running back	Oklahoma	
2	45	Ray Parson	Offensive tackle	Minnesota	
3	71	Jim Mitchell	Defensive end	Virginia State	
5	123	Bob Parker	Guard	Memphis State	
6	149	Tony Terry	Defensive tackle	USC	
7	175	Ken Geddes	Linebacker	Nebraska	
9	227	Herman Weaver	Punter	Tennessee	
10	253	Bruce Maxwell	Running back	Arkansas	
11	279	Roger Laird	Defensive back	Kentucky State	
12	305	Emanuel Murrell	Defensive back	Cal Poly	
13	331	Dave Haverdick	Defensive tackle	Morehead State	
14	357	Charlie Brown	Wide receiver	Northern Arizona	
15	383	Bob Haney	Offensive tackle	Idaho	
16	409	Jerry Todd	Defensive back	Memphis State	
17	435	Jesse Marshall	Defensive tackle	Centenary	
Made roster * Made at least one Pro Bowl during career

== Personnel ==
=== Staff / Coaches ===
1970 Detroit Lions staff
Front office: Owner - William Clay Ford, Sr.; Vice President / General manager - Russ Thomas; Executive Vice President - Edwin J. Anderson; Treasurer - Newton S. Peters; Publicity Director / Business Manager - Lyall Smith; Assistant Publicity Director - Elliott Trumbull; Equipment manager - Roy Marklem; Assistant equipment manager - Charles "Rip" Collins; Head coaches: Head coach – Joe Schmidt; Offensive coaches: Offensive Coordinator / Backs - Bill McPeak; Offensive Line - Chuck Knox; Wide Receivers - Johnny North	Defensive coaches: Defensive Coordinator / Secondary - Jim David; Defensive Line / Linebackers - Jim Martin; Strength and conditioning: Trainer - Kent Falb; Assistant Trainer - Dave Smith

=== Roster ===
1970 Detroit Lions roster
Quarterbacks: 11 Greg Landry; 19 Bill Munson; Running backs: 24 Mel Farr; 46 Bruce Maxwell; 36 Steve Owens; 42 Altie Taylor; 38 Bill Triplett; Wide receivers: 81 Charlie Brown; 85 Chuck Hughes; 25 Earl McCullouch; 49 Larry Walton; Tight ends: 87 Craig Cotton; 88 Charlie Sanders	Offensive linemen: 52 Bill Cottrell C; 54 Ed Flanagan C; 76 Rocky Freitas T; 68 Frank Gallagher G; 67 Rocky Rasley G; 73 Roger Shoals T; 71 Chuck Walton G; 75 Jim Yarbrough T; Defensive linemen: 72 Dan Goich DT; 74 Larry Hand DE; 80 Dave Haverdick DT/DE; 71 Alex Karras DT; 83 Jim Mitchell DE; 82 Jerry Rush DT	Linebackers: 53 Mike Lucci MLB; 57 Terry Miller MLB; 62 Ed Mooney OLB; 50 Paul Naumoff OLB; 55 Wayne Walker OLB; Defensive backs: 20 Lem Barney CB; 44 Dick LeBeau CB; 47 Wayne Rasmussen FS; 48 Tom Vaughn FS; 28 Mike Weger SS; 45 Bobby Williams CB; Special teams: 12 Errol Mann K; 18 Herman Weaver P	Reserve lists: -- Bob Bergum DE (Military); -- Wilson Bowie RB (IR); 26 George Hoey CB (Military); 66 Bob Kowalkowski G (IR); 79 Ray Parson T (IR); 84 Joe Robb DE (IR); -- Tony Terry DT (IR); 89 John Wright WR (IR); Taxi squad: 14 Greg Barton QB; 40 Nick Eddy RB; -- Manuel Murrell CB; 23 Phil Odle WR; 58 Bill Saul LB; _{39 active, 8 reserve, 5 taxi / practice squad} Rookies in italics

== Regular season ==
=== Schedule ===
Week	Date	Opponent	Result	Record	Venue	Attendance	Recap
1	September 20	at **Green Bay Packers**	**W** 40–0	1–0	Lambeau Field	56,263	Recap
2	September 27	Cincinnati Bengals	**W** 38–3	2–0	Tiger Stadium	58,202	Recap
3	October 5	**Chicago Bears**	**W** 28–14	3–0	Tiger Stadium	58,210	Recap
4	October 11	at Washington Redskins	**L** 10–31	3–1	RFK Stadium	50,414	Recap
5	October 18	at Cleveland Browns	**W** 41–24	4–1	Cleveland Municipal Stadium	83,577	Recap
6	October 25	at **Chicago Bears**	**W** 16–10	5–1	Wrigley Field	45,632	Recap
7	November 1	**Minnesota Vikings**	**L** 17–30	5–2	Tiger Stadium	58,210	Recap
8	November 8	at New Orleans Saints	**L** 17–19	5–3	Tulane Stadium	66,910	Recap
9	November 15	at **Minnesota Vikings**	**L** 20–24	5–4	Metropolitan Stadium	47,900	Recap
10	November 22	San Francisco 49ers	**W** 28–7	6–4	Tiger Stadium	56,232	Recap
11	November 26	Oakland Raiders	**W** 28–14	7–4	Tiger Stadium	56,597	Recap
12	December 6	St. Louis Cardinals	**W** 16–3	8–4	Tiger Stadium	56,362	Recap
13	December 14	at Los Angeles Rams	**W** 28–23	9–4	Los Angeles Memorial Coliseum	79,441	Recap
14	December 20	**Green Bay Packers**	**W** 20–0	10–4	Tiger Stadium	57,387	Recap
Note: Intra-division opponents are in **bold** text.

=== Season summary ===
==== Week 3 ====
Team	1	2	3	4	Total
Bears	7	0	0	7	14
• **Lions**	0	0	21	7	28

- Date: October 5
- Location: Tiger Stadium • Detroit, Michigan
- Game start: 8:00 p.m. EST
- Game weather: 55 °F (13 °C) • Wind 13 mph (21 km/h)
- Referee: Jack Vest
- TV announcers (ABC): Keith Jackson, Howard Cosell & Don Meredith

Scoring summary
1	CHI	Dick Gordon 20-yard pass from Jack Concannon (Mac Percival kick)	Bears 7–0
3	DET	Mel Farr 3-yard run (Errol Mann kick)	Tie 7–7
3	DET	Altie Taylor 7-yard run (Errol Mann kick)	Lions 14–7
3	DET	Larry Walton 13-yard pass from Bill Munson (Errol Mann kick)	Lions 21–7
3	CHI	Dick Gordon 60-yard pass from Jack Concannon (Mac Percival kick)	Lions 21–14
4	DET	Mel Farr 20-yard run (Errol Mann kick)	Lions 28–14

=== Standings ===
NFC Central
	W	L	T	PCT	DIV	CONF	PF	PA	STK
Minnesota Vikings	12	2	0	.857	5–1	10–1	335	143	W3
Detroit Lions	10	4	0	.714	4–2	7–4	347	202	W5
Green Bay Packers	6	8	0	.429	2–4	4–7	196	293	L2
Chicago Bears	6	8	0	.429	1–5	5–6	256	261	W2

Note: Tie games were not officially counted in the standings until 1972.

== Playoffs ==
NFC Playoff, Dallas Cowboys 5, Detroit Lions 0

Quarter	1	2	3	4	Total
Lions	0	0	0	0	0
Cowboys	3	0	0	2	5

at Cotton Bowl, Dallas, Texas

- Date: December 26, 1970
- Game time: 4:00 p.m. EST/3:00 p.m. CST
- Game attendance: 69,613
- Referee: Jim Tunney
- TV announcers (CBS): Frank Glieber and Frank Gifford

Game information
- Scoring
  - DAL – field goal Clark 26 DAL 3–0
  - DAL – Safety, Andrie tackled Landry in end zone DAL 5–0
