= 1969 Detroit Lions season =

NFL team season

- Head coach: Joe Schmidt
- Home stadium: Tiger Stadium

Results
- Record: 9–4–1
- Division place: 2nd NFL Central
- Playoffs: Did not qualify

The 1969 Detroit Lions season was the 40th season in franchise history. They enjoyed their best season in seven years, and their first winning campaign since 1964, by finishing in second place in the NFL Central Division with a solid 9–4–1 record led by a stingy defense that only allowed 188 total points on the season. However, the Lions still failed to qualify for the postseason, for the 12th straight season. The Lions were the only team to lose to the Pittsburgh Steelers, doing so in week 1 of the season. Pittsburgh lost their remaining 13 games. The loss to the Steelers proved costly to the Lions, as it served as a big blow to their playoff hopes.

== Offseason ==
=== NFL draft ===
1969 Detroit Lions draft
Round	Pick	Player	Position	College	Notes
2	34	Altie Taylor	RB	Utah State	
2	47	Jim Yarbrough	TE	Florida	from Los Angeles
3	59	Larry Walton	WR	Arizona State	from New Orleans
8	190	Jim Carr	OT	Jackson State	
9	216	Rocky Rasley	G	Oregon State	
10	242	Bob Bergum	DE	Wisconsin-Platteville	
11	268	Ron Walker	DE	Morris Brown	
12	294	Bob Hadlock	DT	George Fox (Ore.)	
13	320	Wilson Bowie	RB	USC	
14	346	George Hoey	WR	Michigan	
15	372	Fred Gough	LB	Texas-Arlington	
16	398	Ken Spain	DE	Houston	
16	407	John Stahl	G	Fresno State	
17	424	Gary Steele	TE	Army	
Made roster * Made at least one Pro Bowl during career

Notes

- Detroit traded its first-round selection (8th) and QB Milt Plum, P/WR Pat Studstill and RB Tommy Watkins to Los Angeles in exchange for QB Bill Munson and the Rams' third-round selection (73rd).
- Detroit traded DT Roger Brown to Los Angeles in exchange for the Rams' second-round selection (47th) and first- and third-round selections in 1968.
- Detroit traded QB Karl Sweetan to New Orleans in exchange for the Saints' third-round selection (59th).
- Detroit traded its third-round selection (60th), fourth-round selection in 1970 and S Bruce Maher to N.Y. Giants in exchange for RB Bill Triplett and LB Bill Swain.
- Detroit traded the third-round selection received from the Rams (73rd) to St. Louis in exchange for WR Billy Gambrell.
- Detroit traded its fourth-round selection (86th) and third-round selection (65th) in 1968 to San Francisco in exchange for RB David Kopay.
- Detroit traded its sixth- and seventh-round selections (138th) and (164th) to Atlanta in exchange for DT Chuck Sieminski and LB Andy Bowling.

== Personnel ==
=== Staff / coaches ===
1969 Detroit Lions staff
Front office: Owner - William Clay Ford, Sr.; Vice president / general manager - Russ Thomas; Executive vice president - Edwin J. Anderson; Treasurer - Newton S. Peters; Publicity director / business manager - Lyall Smith; Assistant publicity director - Elliott Trumbull; Equipment manager - Roy Marklem; Assistant equipment manager - Charles "Rip" Collins; Head coaches: Head coach – Joe Schmidt; Offensive coaches: Offensive coordinator / backs - Bill McPeak; Offensive line - Chuck Knox; Wide receivers - Johnny North	Defensive coaches: Defensive coordinator / secondary - Jim David; Defensive line / linebackers - Jim Martin; Strength and conditioning: Trainer - Kent Falb; Assistant trainer - Dave Smith

=== Final roster ===
1969 Detroit Lions roster
Quarterbacks: 14 Greg Barton; 11 Greg Landry; 19 Bill Munson; Running backs: 35 Tom Nowatzke; 42 Altie Taylor; 38 Bill Triplett; 30 Larry Watkins; 32 Gene Wren; Wide receivers: 81 Bill Malinchak; 25 Earl McCullouch; 49 Larry Walton; 89 John Wright; Tight ends: 87 Craig Cotton; 88 Charlie Sanders	Offensive linemen: 52 Bill Cottrell C; 54 Ed Flanagan C; 76 Rocky Freitas T; 68 Frank Gallagher G; 67 Rocky Rasley G; 73 Roger Shoals T; 63 Chuck Walton G; 75 Jim Yarbrough T; Defensive linemen: 72 Dan Goich DE/DT; 74 Larry Hand DE; 71 Alex Karras DT; 70 Denis Moore DT/DE; 84 Joe Robb DE; 82 Jerry Rush DT	Linebackers: 53 Mike Lucci MLB; 62 Ed Mooney OLB; 50 Paul Naumoff OLB; 55 Wayne Walker OLB; 51 Bill Swain MLB; Defensive backs: 20 Lem Barney CB/P; 44 Dick LeBeau CB; 47 Wayne Rasmussen SS; 48 Tom Vaughn FS; 28 Mike Weger SS; 45 Bobby Williams CB; Special teams: 12 Errol Mann K	Reserve lists: -- Wilson Bowie RB (IR); -- Solomon Brannan CB (IR); 15 Jerry DePoyster K/P (Military); 40 Nick Eddy RB (IR); 24 Mel Farr RB (IR); 66 Bob Kowalkowski G (IR); 23 Phil Odle WR (IR); 1 Garo Yepremian K (Military); Taxi squad: -- Bob Bergum DE; -- Fred Gough LB; 26 George Hoey CB; 57 Terry Miller LB; rookies in italics

== Regular season ==
=== Schedule ===
Week	Date	Opponent	Result	Record	Venue	Attendance
1	September 21	at Pittsburgh Steelers	**L** 13–16	0–1	Pitt Stadium	51,360
2	September 28	New York Giants	**W** 24–0	1–1	Tiger Stadium	54,358
3	October 5	at Cleveland Browns	**W** 28–21	2–1	Cleveland Municipal Stadium	82,833
4	October 12	**Green Bay Packers**	**L** 17–28	2–2	Tiger Stadium	58,384
5	October 19	**Chicago Bears**	**W** 13–7	3–2	Tiger Stadium	54,732
6	October 26	at **Minnesota Vikings**	**L** 10–24	3–3	Metropolitan Stadium	47,900
7	November 2	at San Francisco 49ers	**W** 26–14	4–3	Kezar Stadium	35,100
8	November 9	Atlanta Falcons	**W** 27–21	5–3	Tiger Stadium	53,242
9	November 16	St. Louis Cardinals	**W** 20–0	6–3	Tiger Stadium	51,749
10	November 23	at **Green Bay Packers**	**W** 16–10	7–3	Lambeau Field	50,861
11	November 27	**Minnesota Vikings**	**L** 0–27	7–4	Tiger Stadium	57,906
12	December 7	at Baltimore Colts	**T** 17–17	7–4–1	Memorial Stadium	60,238
13	December 14	Los Angeles Rams	**W** 28–0	8–4–1	Tiger Stadium	53,256
14	December 21	at **Chicago Bears**	**W** 20–3	9–4–1	Wrigley Field	41,879
Note: Intra-division opponents are in **bold** text.

== Season summary ==
=== Week 11 vs Vikings ===
Week Eleven: Minnesota Vikings (9–1) at Detroit Lions (7–3)

Quarter	1	2	3	4	Total
Vikings	7	3	7	10	27
Lions	0	0	0	0	0

at Tiger Stadium, Detroit, Michigan

- Date: November 27
- Game weather: Snow, 36 °F (2 °C)
- Game attendance: 57,906
- Box Score

Game information

First quarter

- MIN – Dave Osborn 1-yard run (Fred Cox kick). Vikings 7–0. Drive:

Second quarter

- MIN – Fred Cox 41-yard field goal. Vikings 10–0. Drive:

Third quarter

- MIN – Oscar Reed 6-yard pass from Joe Kapp (Fred Cox kick). Vikings 17–0. Drive:

Fourth quarter

- MIN – Alan Page 15-yard interception return on a lateral (Fred Cox kick). Vikings 24–0.
- MIN – Fred Cox 38-yard field goal. Vikings 27–0. Drive:

Top passers

- MIN – Joe Kapp – 7/12, 61 yards, TD, INT
- DET – Greg Landry – 12/25, 93 yards, 2 INT

Top rushers

- MIN – Dave Osborn – 15 rushes, 36 yards, TD
- DET – Nick Eddy – 11 rushes, 26 yards

Top receivers

- MIN – Dave Osborn – 2 receptions, 27 yards
- DET – Charlie Sanders – 3 receptions, 47 yards

- Muddy field
- Largest crowd for Thanksgiving game in Detroit history

== Standings ==
NFL Central
	W	L	T	PCT	DIV	CONF	PF	PA	STK
Minnesota Vikings	12	2	0	.857	6–0	9–1	379	133	L1
Detroit Lions	9	4	1	.692	3–3	6–3–1	259	188	W2
Green Bay Packers	8	6	0	.571	3–3	5–5	269	221	W2
Chicago Bears	1	13	0	.071	0–6	0–10	210	339	L6

Note: Tie games were not officially counted in the standings until 1972.
