= 1972 in Michigan =

- Decades: 1950s; 1960s; 1970s; 1980s; 1990s
- See also: History of Michigan; Historical outline of Michigan; List of years in Michigan; 1972 in the United States

Events from the year 1972 in Michigan.

The Associated Press (AP) and United Press International (UPI) each selected the top news stories in Michigan for 1972 as follows:

1. The court order issued by federal judge Stephen Roth requiring cross-district busing throughout metropolitan Detroit (AP-1, UPI-1);
2. The beginning of the Michigan Lottery (AP-2, UPI-4);
3. The defeat of Proposal B that would have amended the state constitution to liberalize Michigan's abortion law (AP-3, UPI-3);
4. George Wallace's victory, attributed to the busing issue, in the 1972 Democratic Party Presidential primary with 51% of the vote (AP-4, UPI-2 [elections]);
5. The defeat of a ballot proposal that would have changed Michigan's system of funding public education, placed a cap on property taxes, and provided for a graduated income tax (AP-6, UPI-7);
6. Controversy concerning the Detroit Police Department's STRESS unit and a shootout between STRESS officers and off-duty Wayne County sheriff's deputies, resulting in the death of a deputy (AP-5, UPI-10);
7. The U.S. Senate campaign in which incumbent Republican Robert P. Griffin defeated Democratic challenger Frank J. Kelley (AP-9, UPI-2 [elections];
8. The skyjacking of an airliner by two Detroit residents, first to Detroit, then to Canada, and finally to Cuba (AP-10, UPI-9);
9. A school funding crisis in Detroit after voters thrice rejected millage proposals (UPI-5)
10. The automobile industry's record sales and profits and controversies over price increases, safety, and emission equipment (UPI-6);
11. High winds that pushed water over the shoreline and resulted in six counties being declared federal disaster areas (AP-7);
12. A collision near Port Huron that resulted in the sinking of the Sidney Smith in the St. Clair River, blocking the navigation channel (AP-8); and
13. Michigan's meat law prohibiting use of udders, snouts, and spleen in making hot dogs and lunch meat was overturned by a federal court (UPI-8).

The AP and UPI also selected the state's top sports stories as follows:

1. The 1972 Detroit Tigers winning the American League East division championship with a record of 86–70, then losing to the Oakland Athletics in the American League Championship Series (AP-1 [ALCS], AP-2 [AL East championship], UPI-2);
2. Duffy Daugherty's resignation after 19 years as head coach of the Michigan State Spartans football team and the hiring of Denny Stolz as his replacement (AP-3 [Daugherty], AP-5 [Stolz], UPI-1 [both]);
3. Michigan Wolverines football, including the 1971 team's 13-12 loss to Stanford in the 1972 Rose Bowl and the 1972 team's 11-1 season and season-ending loss to Ohio State with Michigan head coach Bo Schembechler refusing to kick a game-tying field goal late in the game (AP-4 [OSU game], AP-9 [1972 Rose Bowl], UPI-3 [Rose Bowl and 1972 season]);
4. Gary Player's victory at the 1972 PGA Championship held at Oakland Hills Country Club in Bloomfield Township (AP-6 [tie], UPI-8);
5. Micki King's winning the gold medal in the springboard diving event at the 1972 Summer Olympics (AP-12, UPI-7);
6. The induction of Gordie Howe into the Hockey Hall of Fame and son Mark Howe's becoming the only Michigan athlete to medal at the 1972 Winter Olympics (UPI-3);
7. The 1972 Detroit Lions compiling an 8-5-1 record and failing to make the playoffs (UPI-5);
8. The 1971–72 Detroit Red Wings' finishing in fifth place and failing to make the playoffs (UPI-6);
9. The failure of a proposed domed stadium in downtown Detroit after the Michigan Supreme Court ruled that the proposed manner of selling bonds to finance the stadium was illegal (AP-6 [tie]);
10. The hiring of Burt Smith as Michigan State University's athletic director (AP-6 [tie]);
11. Ed Brinkman setting several Major League Baseball fielding records for shortstops (AP-9);
12. Greg Landry's signing of a three-year contract with the Detroit Lions (AP-10 [tie]);
13. The Detroit Tigers' purchase of Woodie Fryman in early August and his winning 10 games for the Tigers in August and September (AP-10 [tie]); and
14. Michigan's high school basketball championships won by Flint Northern (Class A), River Rouge (Class B), Shelby (Class C), and Ewen-Trout Creek (Class D) (UPI-10).

== Office holders ==
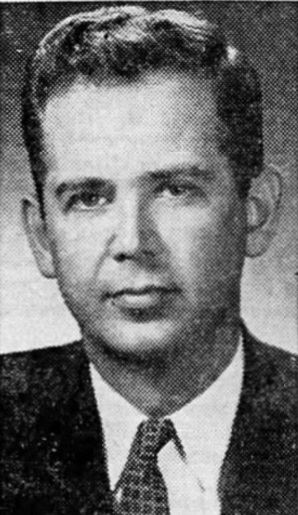
Gov. Milliken

=== State office holders ===
- Governor of Michigan: William Milliken (Republican)
- Lieutenant Governor of Michigan: James H. Brickley (Republican)
- Michigan Attorney General: Frank J. Kelley (Democrat)
- Michigan Secretary of State: Richard H. Austin (Democrat)
- Speaker of the Michigan House of Representatives: William A. Ryan (Democrat)
- Majority Leader of the Michigan Senate: Robert VanderLaan (Republican)
- Chief Justice, Michigan Supreme Court: Thomas M. Kavanagh

=== Mayors of major cities ===
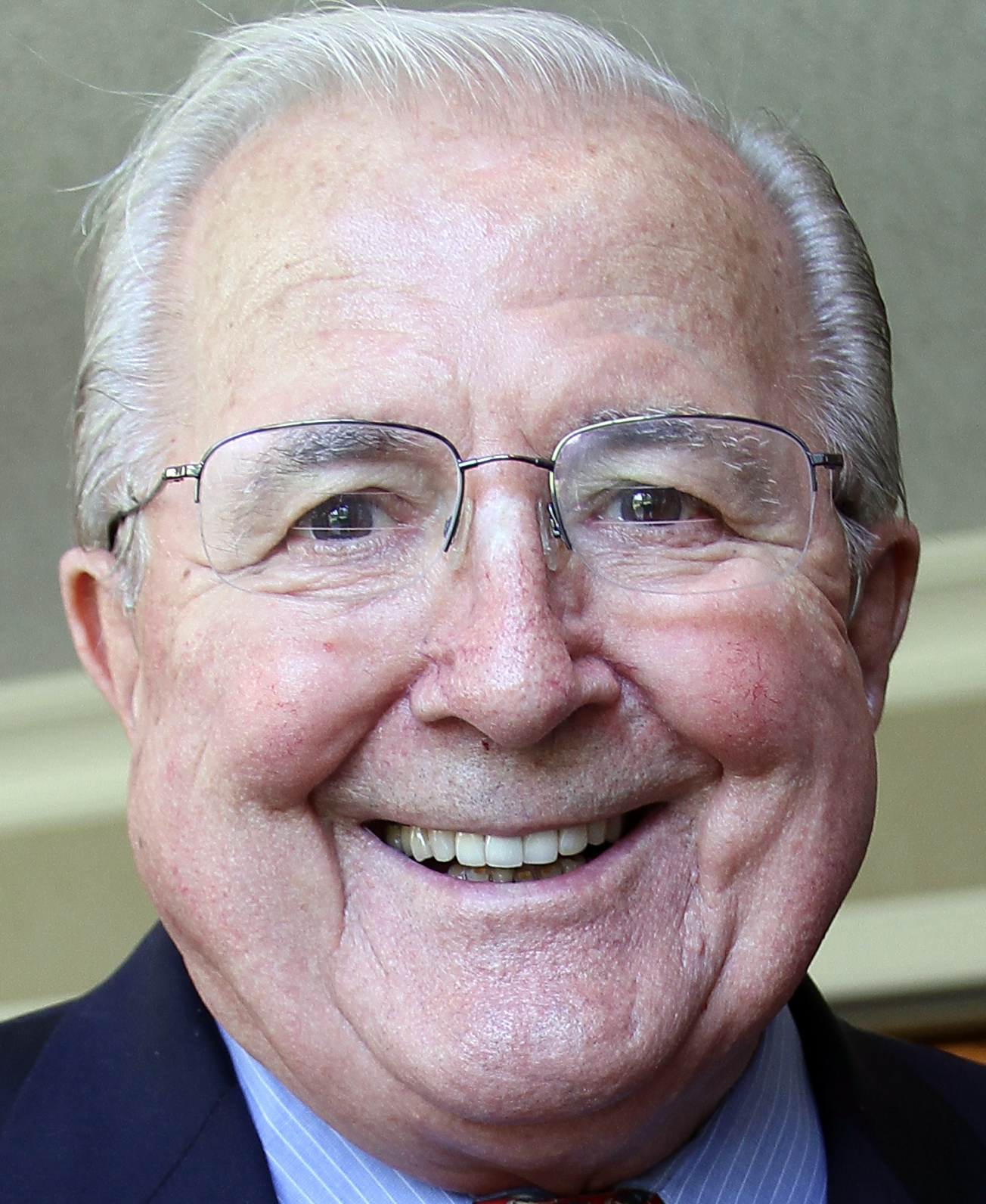
Mayor Gribbs

- Mayor of Detroit: Roman Gribbs
- Mayor of Grand Rapids: Lyman S. Parks
- Mayor of Warren, Michigan: Ted Bates
- Mayor of Sterling Heights, Michigan: Al Martin
- Mayor of Flint: Francis E. Limmer
- Mayor of Lansing: Gerald W. Graves
- Mayor of Dearborn: Orville L. Hubbard
- Mayor of Ann Arbor: Robert J. Harris (Democrat)
- Mayor of Saginaw: Paul H. Wendler

=== Federal office holders ===
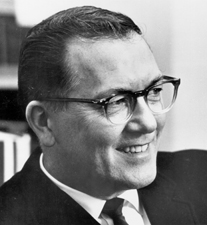
Sen. Griffin

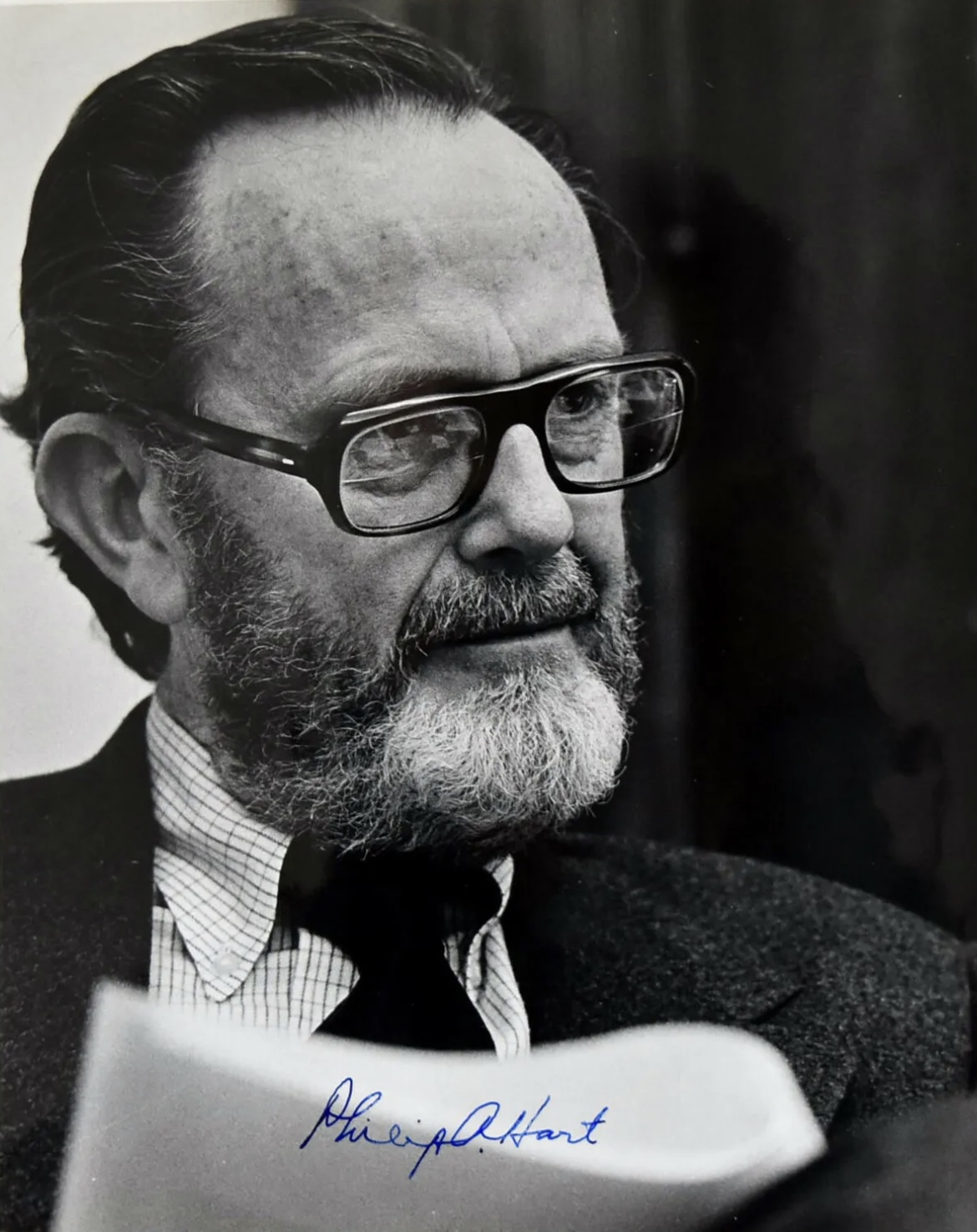
Sen. Hart

- U.S. Senator from Michigan: Robert P. Griffin (Republican)
- U.S. Senator from Michigan: Philip Hart (Democrat)
- House District 1: John Conyers (Democrat)
- House District 2: Marvin L. Esch (Republican)
- House District 3: Garry E. Brown (Republican)
- House District 4: J. Edward Hutchinson (Republican)
- House District 5: Gerald Ford (Republican)
- House District 6: Charles E. Chamberlain (Republican)
- House District 7: Donald W. Riegle Jr. (Republican)
- House District 8: R. James Harvey (Republican)
- House District 9: Guy Vander Jagt (Republican)
- House District 10: Elford Albin Cederberg (Republican)
- House District 11: Philip Ruppe (Republican)
- House District 12: James G. O'Hara (Democrat)
- House District 13: Charles Diggs (Democrat)
- House District 14: Lucien N. Nedzi (Democrat)
- House District 15: William D. Ford (Democrat)
- House District 16: John Dingell Jr. (Democrat)
- House District 17: Martha Griffiths (Democrat)
- House District 18: William Broomfield (Republican)
- House District 19: Jack H. McDonald (Republican)

== Population ==
In the 1970 United States census, Michigan was recorded as having a population of 8,875,083 persons, ranking as the seventh most populous state in the country. By 1980, the state's population had grown 4.4% to 9,262,078 persons.

=== Cities ===
The following is a list of cities in Michigan with a population of at least 70,000 based on 1970 U.S. Census data. Historic census data from 1960 and 1980 is included to reflect trends in population increases or decreases. Cities that are part of the Detroit metropolitan area are shaded in tan.

1970 Rank	City	County	1960 Pop.	1970 Pop.	1980 Pop.	Change 1970-80
1	Detroit	Wayne	1,670,144	1,514,063	1,203,368	−20.5% ▼
2	Grand Rapids	Kent	177,313	197,649	181,843	−8.0% ▼
3	Flint	Genesee	196,940	193,317	159,611	−17.4% ▼
4	Warren	Macomb	89,246	179,260	161,134	−10.1% ▼
5	Lansing	Ingham	107,807	131,403	130,414	−0.8% ▼
6	Livonia	Wayne	66,702	110,109	104,814	−4.8% ▼
7	Dearborn	Wayne	112,007	104,199	90,660	−13.0% ▼
8	Ann Arbor	Washtenaw	67,340	100,035	107,969	7.9% ▲
9	Saginaw	Saginaw	98,265	91,849	77,508	−15.6% ▼
10	St. Clair Shores	Macomb	76,657	88,093	76,210	−13.5% ▼
11	Westland	Wayne	60,743	86,749	84,603	−2.5% ▼
12	Royal Oak	Oakland	80,612	86,238	70,893	−17.8% ▼
13	Kalamazoo	Kalamazoo	82,089	85,555	79,722	−6.8% ▼
14	Pontiac	Oakland	82,233	85,279	76,715	−10.0% ▼
15	Dearborn Heights	Wayne	61,118	80,069	67,706	−15.4% ▼
16	Taylor	Wayne	na	70,020	77,568	10.8% ▲

=== Counties ===
The following is a list of counties in Michigan with populations of at least 120,000 based on 1970 U.S. Census data. Historic census data from 1960 and 1980 are included to reflect trends in population increases or decreases. Counties that are part of the Detroit metropolitan area are shaded in tan.

1970 Rank	County	Largest city	1960 Pop.	1970 Pop.	1980 Pop.	Change 1970-80
1	Wayne	Detroit	2,666,297	2,666,751	2,337,891	−12.3% ▼
2	Oakland	Pontiac	690,259	907,871	1,011,793	11.4% ▲
3	Macomb	Warren	405,804	625,309	694,600	11.1% ▲
4	Genesee	Flint	374,313	444,341	450,449	1.4% ▲
5	Kent	Grand Rapids	363,187	411,044	444,506	8.1% ▲
6	Ingham	Lansing	211,296	261,039	275,520	5.5% ▲
7	Washtenaw	Ann Arbor	172,440	234,103	264,748	13.1% ▲
8	Saginaw	Saginaw	190,752	219,743	228,059	3.8% ▲
9	Kalamazoo	Kalamazoo	169,712	201,550	212,378	5.4% ▲
10	Berrien	Benton Harbor	149,865	163,875	171,276	4.5% ▲
11	Muskegon	Muskegon	129,943	157,426	157,589	0.1% ▲
12	Jackson	Jackson	131,994	143,274	151,495	5.7% ▲
13	Calhoun	Battle Creek	138,858	141,963	141,557	−0.3% ▼
14	Ottawa	Holland	98,719	128,181	157,174	22.6% ▲
15	St. Clair	Port Huron	107,201	120,175	138,802	15.5% ▲
16	Monroe	Monroe	101,120	118,479	134,659	13.7% ▲
17	Bay	Bay City	107,042	117,339	119,881	2.2% ▲

== Sports ==
=== Baseball ===
- 1972 Detroit Tigers season – Under manager Billy Martin, the Tigers compiled an 86–70 record and finished first in the American League East, then lost to the Oakland Athletics in the 1972 American League Championship Series . The team's statistical leaders included Al Kaline with a .313 batting average, Norm Cash with 22 home runs and 61 RBIs, Mickey Lolich with 22 wins, and Woodie Fryman with a 2.06 earned run average.
- 1972 Michigan Wolverines baseball team - Under head coach Moby Benedict, the Wolverines compiled an 18–13–1 record and finished in a tie for third place in the Big Ten Conference.

=== American football ===
- 1972 Detroit Lions season – The Lions, under head coach Joe Schmidt, compiled an 8–5–1 record and finished in second place in the NFL's Central Division. The team's statistical leaders included Greg Landry with 2,066 passing yards, Altie Taylor with 658 rushing yards, Larry Walton with 485 receiving yards, and Errol Mann with 98 points scored.
- 1972 Michigan Wolverines football team – Under head coach Bo Schembechler, the Wolverines compiled a 10–1 record, losing to Ohio State in the final game of the season. The Wolverines were ranked No. 6 in the final AP Poll. The team's statistical leaders included Dennis Franklin with 818 passing yards, Ed Shuttlesworth with 713 rushing yards and 78 points scored, and Paul Seal with 243 receiving yards.
- 1972 Michigan State Spartans football team – Under head coach Duffy Daugherty, the Spartans compiled a 5–5–1 record.

=== Basketball ===
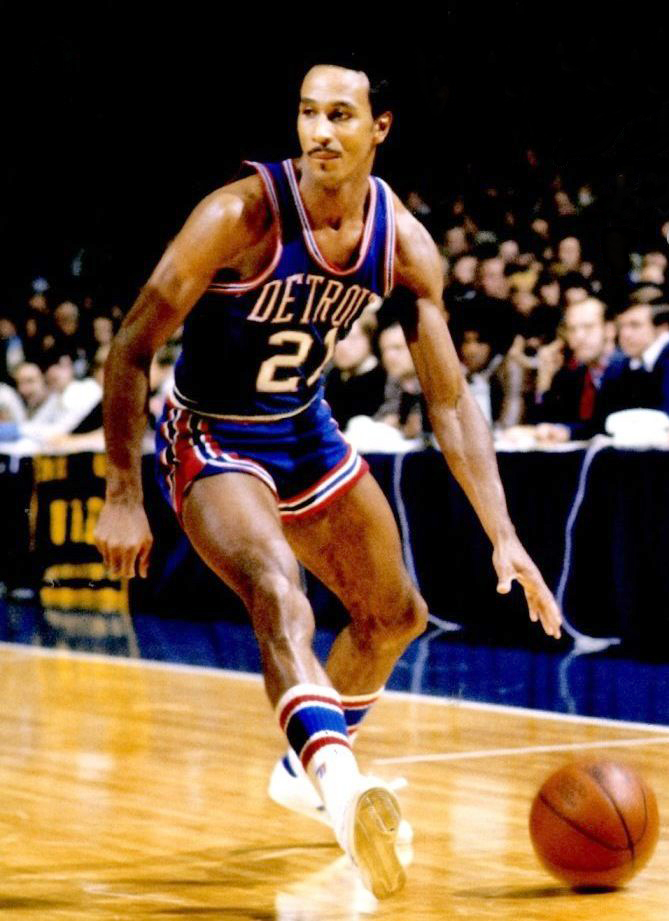
Dave Bing

- 1971–72 Detroit Pistons season – Under head coaches Butch Van Breda Kolff, Terry Dischinger, and Earl Lloyd, the Pistons compiled a 26–56 record. The team's statistical leaders included Dave Bing with 2,056 points and 317 assists and Bob Lanier with 1,132 rebounds.
- 1971–72 Michigan Wolverines men's basketball team – Under head coach Johnny Orr, the Wolverines compiled a 14–10 record and finished third in the Big Ten Conference. The team's statistical leaders included Henry Wilmore with 479 points and John Lockard with 236 rebounds.
- 1971–72 Michigan State Spartans men's basketball team – Under head coach Gus Ganakas, the Spartans compiled a 13–11 record.
- 1971–72 Detroit Titans men's basketball team – The Titans compiled an 18–6 record under head coach Jim Harding.

=== Ice hockey ===
- 1971–72 Detroit Red Wings season – Under head coaches Doug Barkley and Johnny Wilson, the Red Wings compiled a 33–35–10 record and finished fifth in the National Hockey League's East Division. The team's statistical leaders included Mickey Redmond with 42 goals and Marcel Dionne with 49 assists and 77 points scored. The team's regular goaltenders were Al Smith and Joe Daley.
- 1971–72 Michigan State Spartans men's ice hockey team – Under head coach Amo Bessone, the Spartans compiled a 20–16 record.
- 1971–72 Michigan Tech Huskies men's ice hockey team – Under head coach John MacInnes, Michigan Tech compiled a 16–17–1 record.
- 1971–72 Michigan Wolverines men's ice hockey season – Under head coach Al Renfrew, the Wolverines compiled a 16–18 record.

=== Golf ===
- Buick Open –
- Michigan Open –

=== Boat racing ===
- Port Huron to Mackinac Boat Race –
- Spirit of Detroit race –
- APBA Gold Cup –

=== Other ===
- 1971 NCAA Indoor Track and Field Championships – The fifth annual NCAA indoor championships were held at Cobo Arena in Detroit in March; Villanova won the team championship.
- Yankee 600 -

== Music ==
The following albums by Michigan artists were released in 1972:

- Young, Gifted and Black by Aretha Franklin was released on January 24, 1972. Franklin won a 1972 Grammy Award for Best Female R&B Vocal Performance of the year for the album.
- Music of My Mind by Stevie Wonder was released on March 3, 1972. The album featured the single "Superwoman (Where Were You When I Needed You)".
- Floy Joy by The Supremes was released in May 1972.
- Amazing Grace by Aretha Franklin was released on June 1, 1972. It was the biggest selling album of Franklin's recording career and the highest selling live gospel music album of all time. It won Franklin the 1973 Grammy Award for Best Soul Gospel Performance.
- All Directions by The Temptations was released on July 27, 1972.
- Flying High Together by The Miracles was released on July 27, 1972.
- Smokin' O.P.'s by Bob Seger was released in August 1972.
- Phoenix by Grand Funk Railroad was released on September 15, 1972.
- Talking Book by Stevie Wonder was released on October 28, 1972. The album featured two No. 1 hit singles, "You Are the Sunshine of My Life" and "Superstition". The album was certified Gold in Canada and The US.
- Lady Sings the Blues by Diana Ross was released in October 1972. It was the fifth best-selling Pop album of 1973.

== Chronology of events ==
=== November ===
- November 27 - Following a special election, Erma Henderson is sworn in as the first African American woman elected to the Detroit City Council.

== Births ==
- January 19 - Tyrone Wheatley, NFL running back (1995–2004), in Inkster, Michigan
- February 16 - Jerome Bettis, NFL running back (1993–2005) and Pro Football Hall of Fame inductee, in Detroit
- March 1 - Hughes brothers, film directors (Menace II Society, Dead Presidents, From Hell and The Book of Eli), in Detroit
- April 11 - Jason Varitek, Boston Red Sox catcher (1997–2011) and 3× All-Star, in Rochester, Michigan
- June 23 - Selma Blair, actress (Cruel Intentions, Legally Blonde, Hellboy), in Southfield, Michigan
- July 28 - Elizabeth Berkley, actress (Saved by the Bell, Showgirls), in Farmington Hills, Michigan

=== Gallery of 1972 births ===
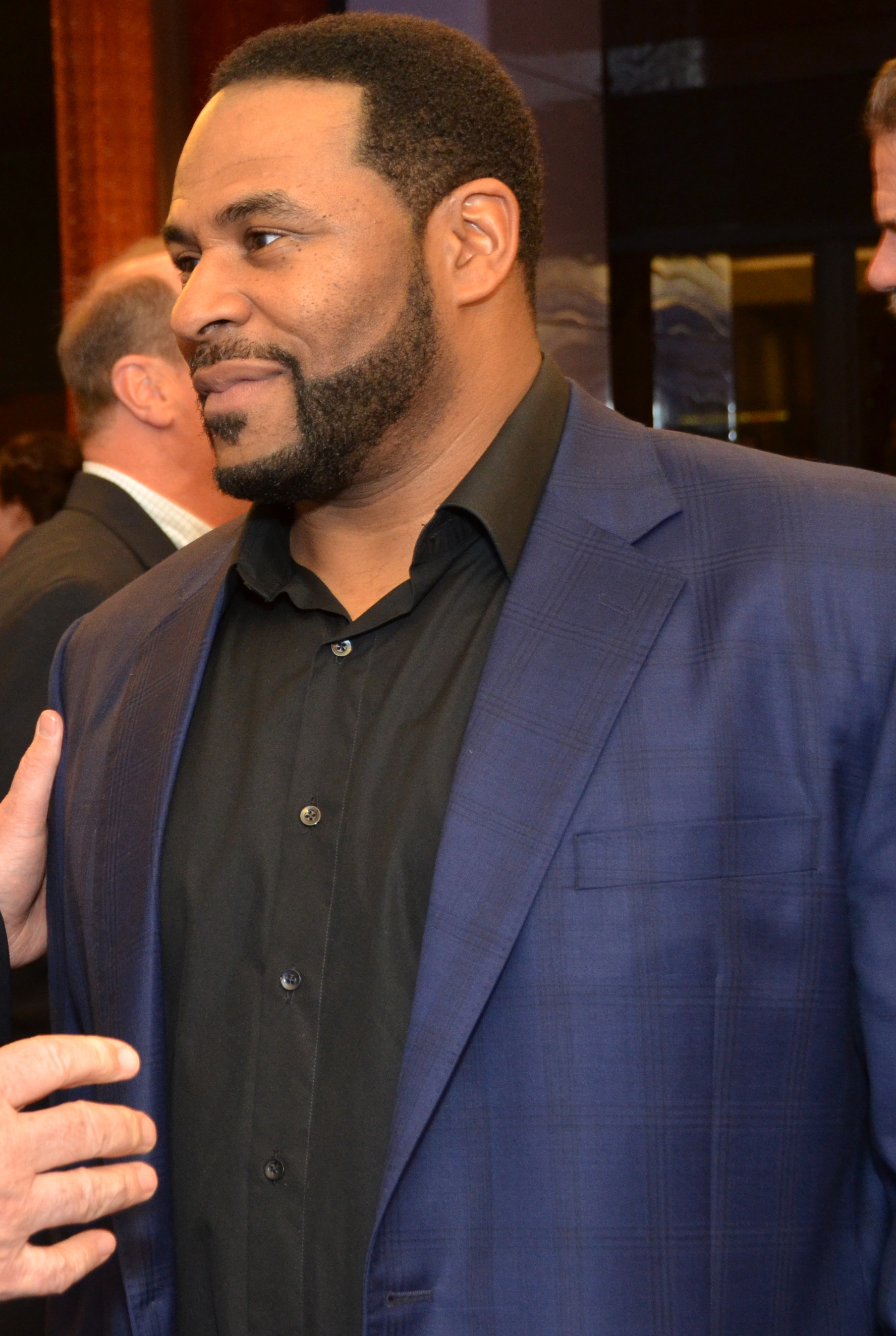
Jerome Bettis

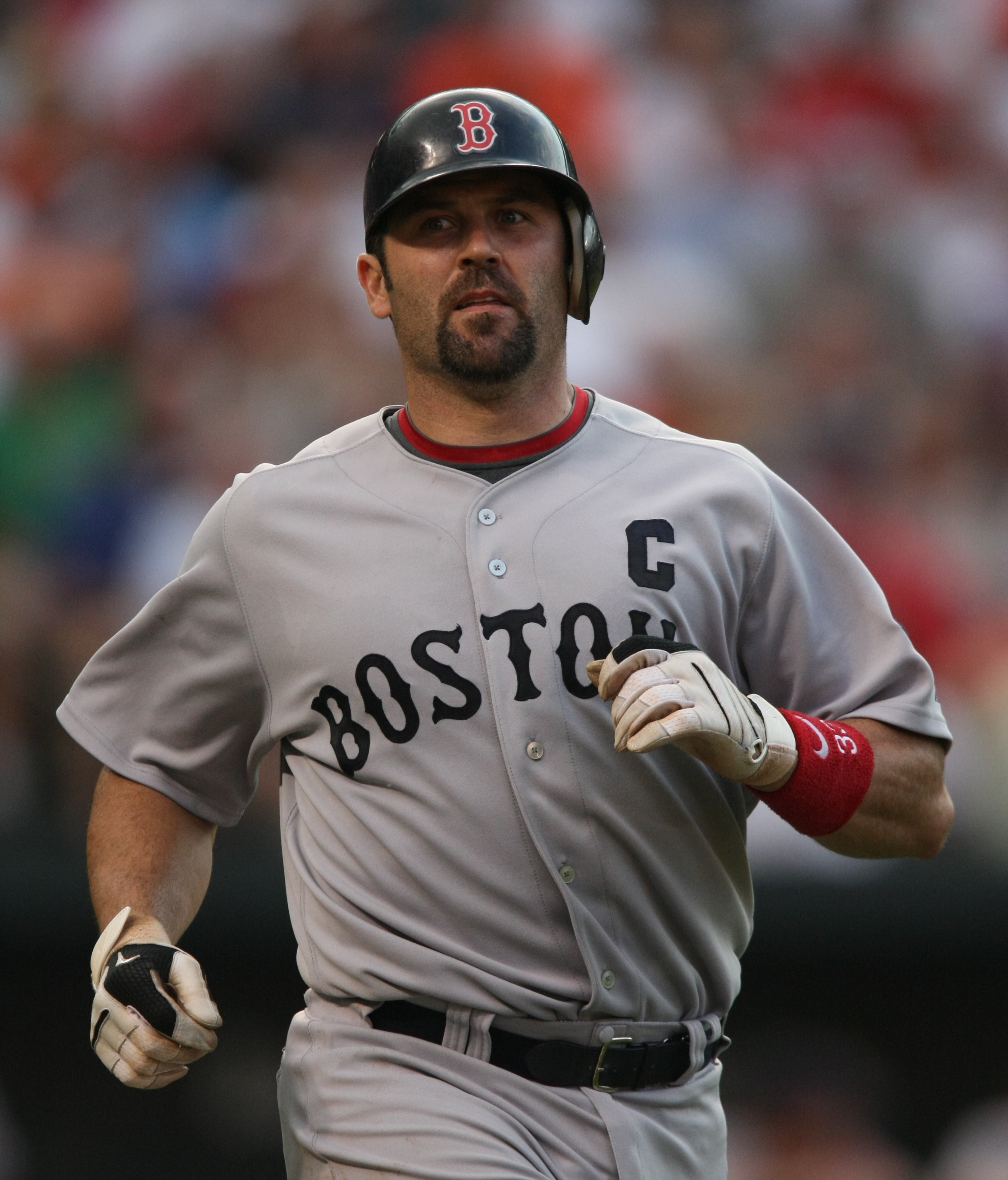
Jason Varitek

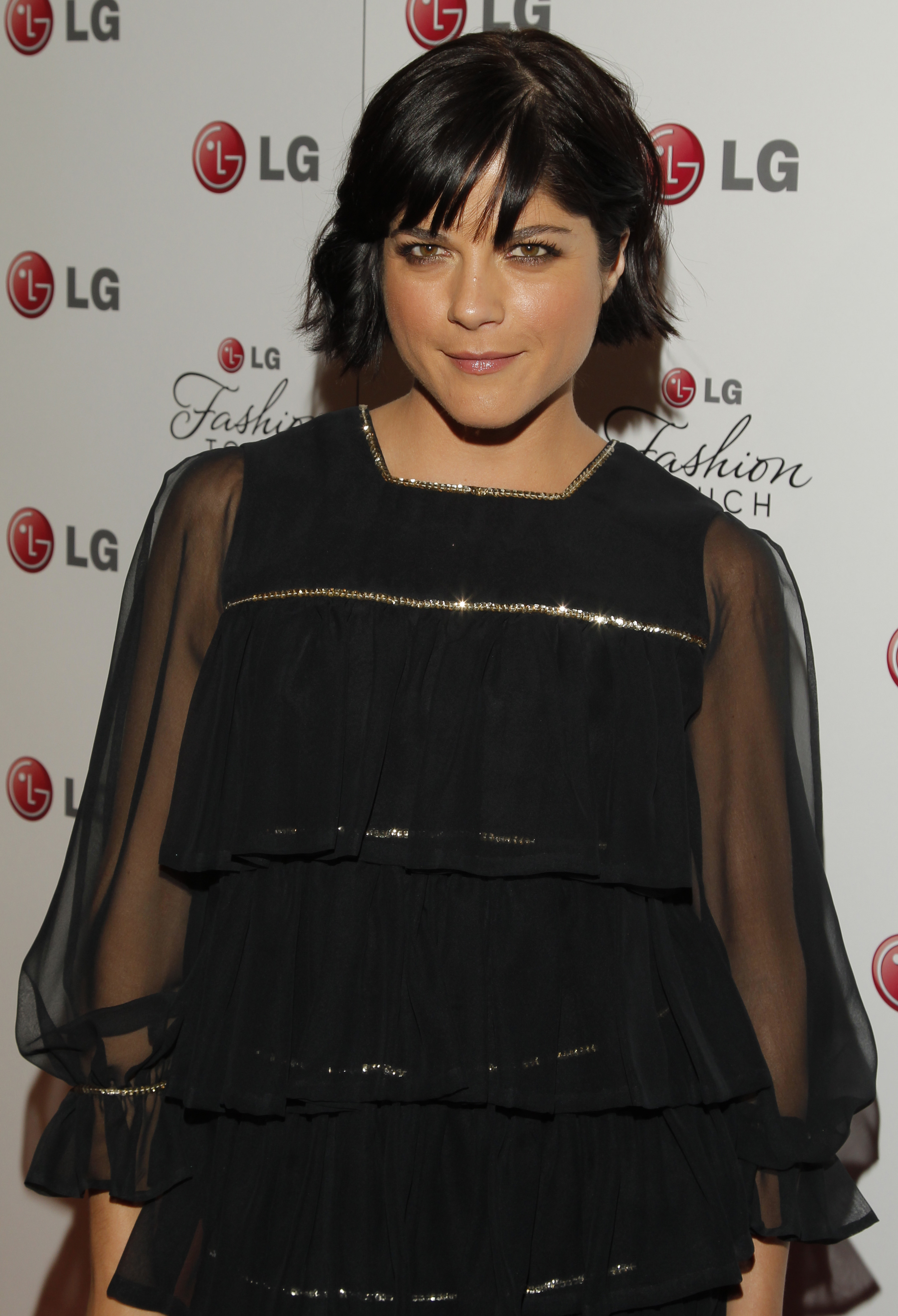
Selma Blair

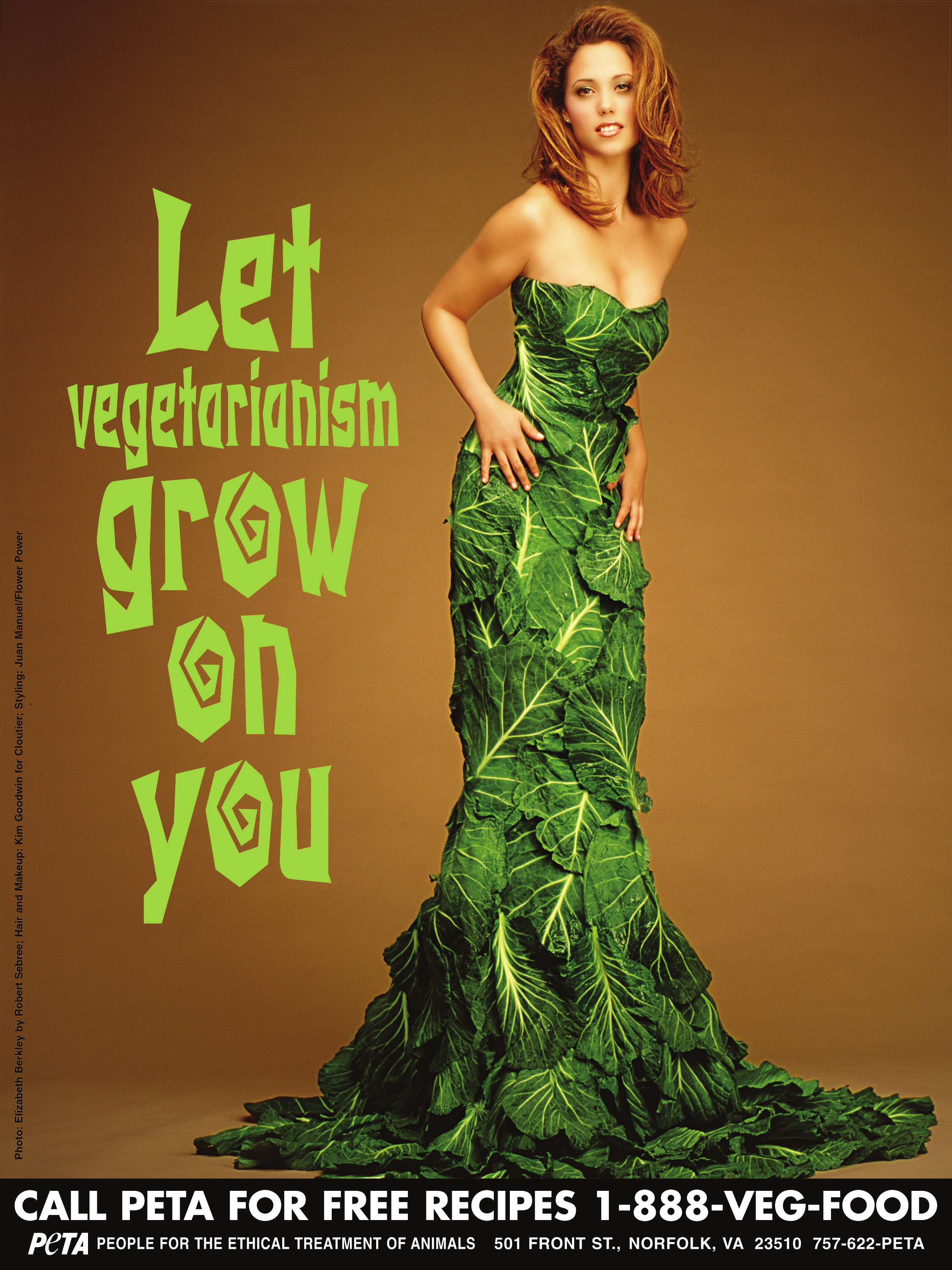
Elizabeth Berkley

== Deaths ==
- February 28 - Dizzy Trout, pitcher for Detroit Tigers (1939–1952), 2× All-Star, AL wins leader (1943), MLB ERA leader (1944), at age 56 in Harvey, Illinois
- March 14 - Len Ford, AAFC/NFL player (1948-1958) and Pro Football Hall of Fame inductee, at age 46 in Detroit
- May 6 - Lyman Frimodig, the only athlete in the history of Michigan State University to receive ten varsity letters, four each in basketball and baseball and two in football, at age 80 in Lansing, Michigan
- August - Benjamin Van Alstyne, head coach Michigan State Spartans men's basketball (1926-1949), at age 79 in Southfield, Michigan
- September 14 - Harry Kipke, American football player (1920-1923) and coach (1928-1937), at age 73 in Port Huron, Michigan
- November 8 - Potsy Clark, American football player and coach (1914-1948), at age 78 in La Jolla, California

=== Gallery of 1972 deaths ===
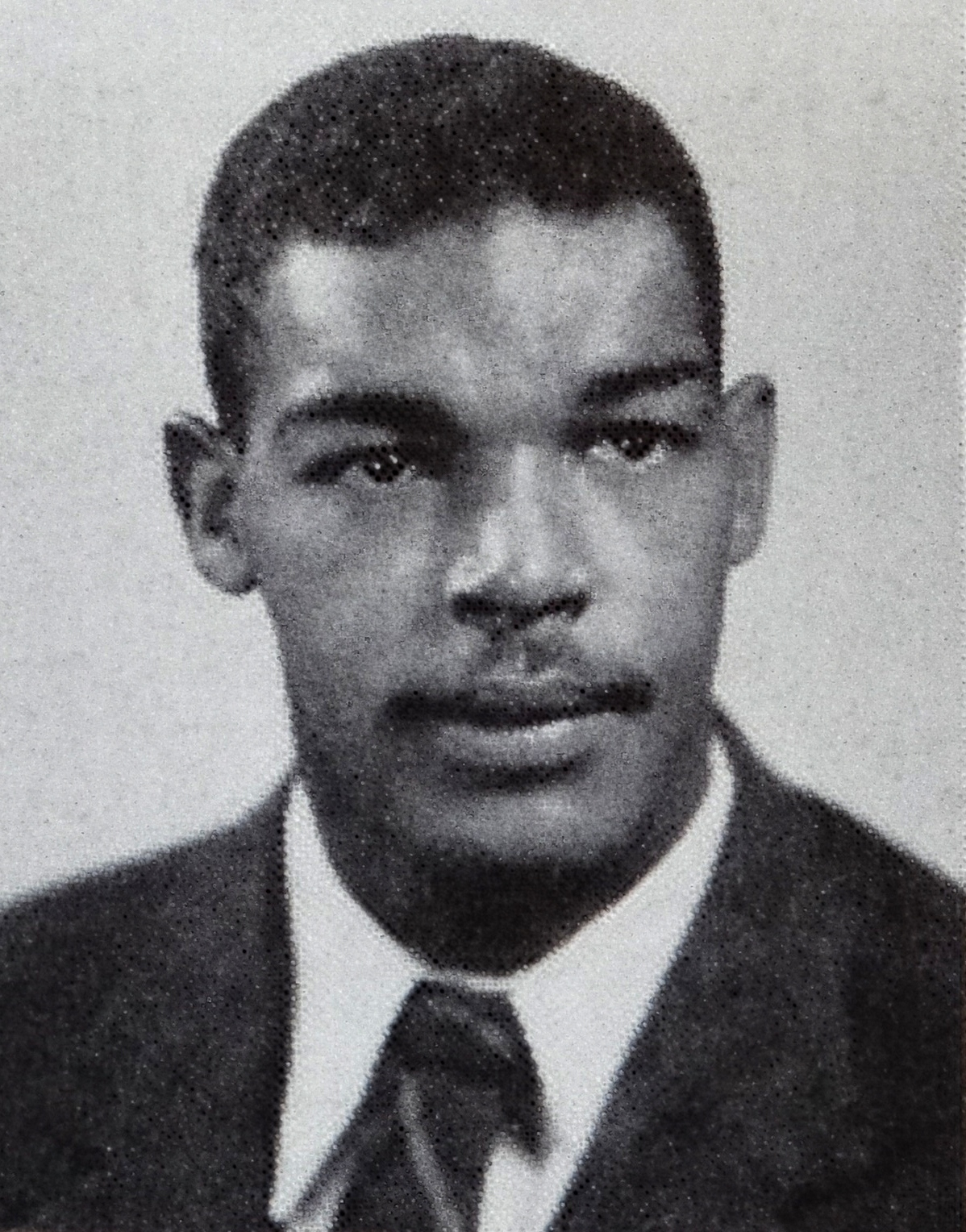
Len Ford

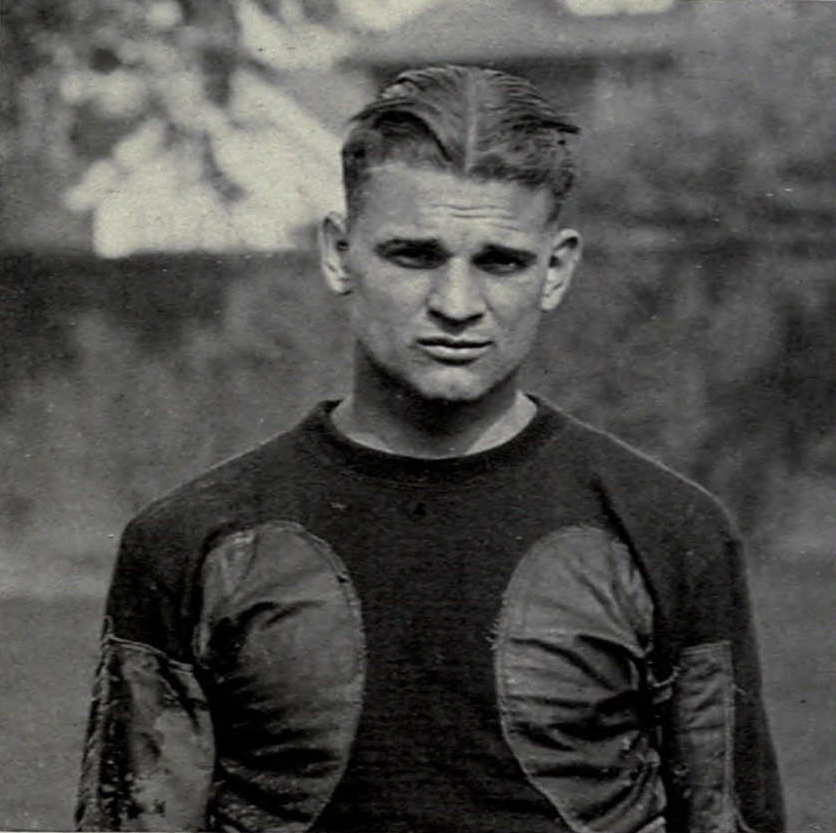
Harry Kipke

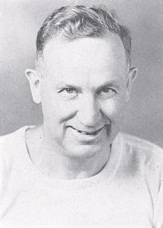
Potsy Clark

== See also ==
- History of Michigan
- History of Detroit
