= List of Morehead State Eagles in the NFL draft =

This is a list of Morehead State Eagles football players in the NFL draft.

== Key ==
B	Back	K	Kicker	NT	Nose tackle
C	Center	LB	Linebacker	FB	Fullback
DB	Defensive back	P	Punter	HB	Halfback
DE	Defensive end	QB	Quarterback	WR	Wide receiver
DT	Defensive tackle	RB	Running back	G	Guard
E	End	T	Offensive tackle	TE	Tight end

= Pro Bowler
= Hall of Famer

== Selections ==
Year	Round	Pick	Overall	Player	Team	Position
1943	24	2	222	Vince Zachem	Philadelphia Eagles	C
1951	12	12	147	Stew Kirtley	Cleveland Browns	E
1967	17	23	442	George Adams	Dallas Cowboys	LB
1968	8	15	207	Tom Gray	San Francisco 49ers	WR
1970	13	19	331	Dave Haverdick	Detroit Lions	DT
1971	12	2	288	Ron Gathright	New Orleans Saints	DB
1979	1	7	7	Phil Simms	New York Giants	QB
1980	9	3	224	Greg Bright	Cincinnati Bengals	DB
1991	12	21	327	Darrell Beavers	Philadelphia Eagles	DB
