= Joe Schmidt (American football) =

American football player and coach (1932–2024)

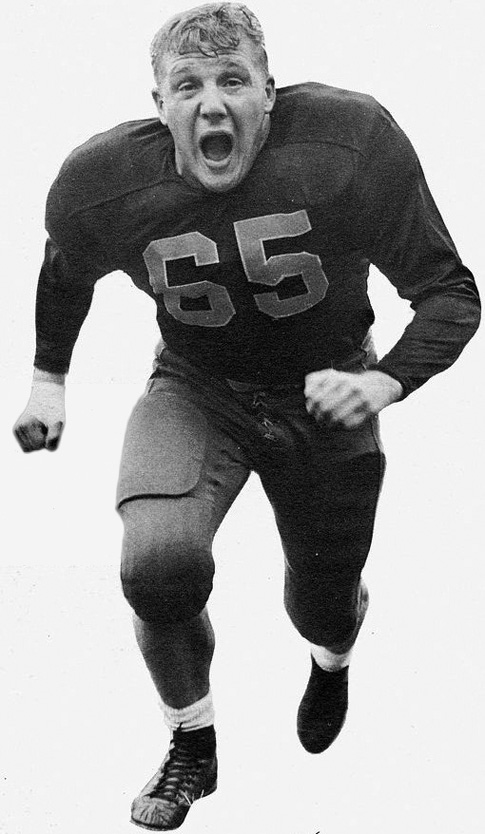
- Schmidt from The 1953 Owl, Pittsburgh yearbook

No. 56
- Position: Linebacker

Personal information
- Born: January 19, 1932; Pittsburgh, Pennsylvania, U.S.
- Died: September 11, 2024 (aged 92); Palm Beach Gardens, Florida, U.S.
- Listed height: 6 ft 1 in (1.85 m)
- Listed weight: 220 lb (100 kg)

Career information
- High school: Brentwood (Pittsburgh)
- College: Pittsburgh
- NFL draft: 1953: 7th round, 85th overall pick

Career history

Playing
- Detroit Lions (1953–1965)

Coaching
- Detroit Lions (1966–1972) →Linebackers coach (1966) →Head coach (1967–1972)

Awards and highlights
- 2× NFL champion (1953, 1957); 8× First-team All-Pro (1954–1959, 1961, 1962); 2× Second-team All-Pro (1960, 1963); 10× Pro Bowl (1954–1963); NFL 1950s All-Decade Team; NFL 100th Anniversary All-Time Team; Pride of the Lions; Detroit Lions 75th Anniversary Team; Detroit Lions All-Time Team; Detroit Lions No. 56 retired; First-team All-American (1952); First-team All-Eastern (1952); Pittsburgh Panthers No. 65 retired

Career NFL statistics
- Interceptions: 24
- Interception yards: 294
- Fumble recoveries: 17
- Total touchdowns: 3
- Stats at Pro Football Reference

Head coaching record
- Regular season: 43–34–7 (.554)
- Postseason: 0–1 (.000)
- Career: 43–35–7 (.547)
- Coaching profile at Pro Football Reference
- Pro Football Hall of Fame
- College Football Hall of Fame

Joseph Paul Schmidt (January 19, 1932 – September 11, 2024) was an American professional football player and coach. He played as a linebacker in the National Football League (NFL) for the Detroit Lions for 13 years from 1953 to 1965. He won two NFL championships with the Lions (1953 and 1957), and, between 1954 and 1963, he played in ten consecutive Pro Bowl games and was selected each year as a first-team All-Pro player. He was also voted by his fellow NFL players as the NFL's most valuable defensive player in 1960 and 1963, named to the NFL 1950s All-Decade Team, inducted into the Pro Football Hall of Fame in 1973 and chosen as a member of the NFL 100th Anniversary All-Time Team in 2019.

From 1967 to 1972, Schmidt was the head coach of the Detroit Lions. In six years under Schmidt, the Lions compiled a 43–34–7 record and finished in second place each year from 1969 to 1972. After retiring from the Lions, Schmidt worked as a manufacturer's representative in the automobile industry in Detroit.

A native of Pittsburgh, he played college football for the University of Pittsburgh Panthers team from 1950 to 1952. He was selected by the International News Service as a first-team All-American in 1952 and was inducted into the College Football Hall of Fame in 2000.

== Early life ==
Schmidt was born in Pittsburgh in 1932 and grew up in the borough of Brentwood. Schmidt was the youngest of four brothers. Two of his brothers died while Schmidt was still a boy, one after falling from a tree and the other while serving in the military in June 1944. His father died in February 1945. Another brother played football at Carnegie Tech and recruited Joe to play semipro football at age 14. He later enrolled at Brentwood High School and played football.

== College career ==
Schmidt attended the University of Pittsburgh, playing on the school's football team for three years, from 1950 to 1952. During his first two years as a Pittsburgh football player, the team compiled losing records of 1–8 in 1950 and 3–7 in 1951.

As a senior, Schmidt was the captain of the 1952 Pittsburgh team that compiled a 6–3 record, including victories over Ohio State, Notre Dame, and Army. Prior to the Notre Dame game, Schmidt gave a speech that was credited with motivating the team to defeat the heavily favored Notre Dame team. In the Notre Dame game, Schmidt sustained a concussion and hemorrhage that required him to be hospitalized for ten days.

At the end of the 1952 season, Schmidt was selected as a first-team All-American by the International News Service. He was also selected to play in the Senior Bowl.

== Professional playing career ==
=== Two NFL championships (1953–1957) ===
Schmidt was drafted by the Detroit Lions in the seventh round (85th overall pick) of the 1953 NFL draft. He joined a team that had won the 1952 NFL Championship and led the NFL in scoring defense. The Lions and Schmidt both had doubts as to whether a seventh round pick would be able to make the lineup of the best defense in the NFL. However, Schmidt impressed in the pre-season and was included in the regular season roster. In the first game of the 1953 season, he helped the Lions to a 38–21 win over the Pittsburgh Steelers; the Detroit Free Press wrote that Schmidt was "making tackles all over the field" and was a key in holding the Steelers to 96 rushing yards. Schmidt appeared in all 12 regular season games, intercepted two passes, and helped the Lions to the 1953 NFL Championship with the league's second best scoring defense.

Schmidt again appeared in all 12 regular season games for the 1954 Detroit Lions team that compiled a 9–2–1 record and won the NFC Western Division but lost to the Browns in the 1954 NFL Championship Game despite Schmidt's interception of an Otto Graham pass. At the end of the 1954 season, Schmidt was selected by the Associated Press (AP) as a first-team All-Pro player and by the United Press (UP) as a second-team All-Pro. He was also invited to play in the Pro Bowl, the first of ten consecutive Pro Bowls in Schmidt's career.

In 1955, following an injury to Bobby Layne and the retirement of Les Bingaman, the Lions dropped to 3–9, and the team fell to ninth of 12 NFL teams in scoring defense, but Schmidt continued to impress. He appeared in all 12 games for the Lions, tied an NFL record with eight fumble recoveries, and won the Lions' President's Trophy as the team's most valuable player. He was selected by both the AP and the Newspaper Enterprise Association (NEA) as a first-team All-Pro and by the UP as a second-team All-Pro.

In August 1956, Schmidt was elected as the team captain, a designation he would hold for the next nine years. When the NFL Players Association was formed in 1956, Schmidt was chosen by his teammates as their first player representative. He was also the signal caller for the defense and quickly developed a reputation as being "without peer" at the task. The 1956 Lions improved to 9–3, finishing in second place in the West Division with the third best scoring defense in the NFL. At the end of the 1956 season, Schmidt was selected as a first-team All-Pro by the AP, UP, NEA, and The Sporting News (TSN).

Schmidt had perhaps his best season in 1957. As team captain, he appeared in every game and led the 1957 Lions to their third NFL championship in six years. Schmidt intercepted two passes in the post-season and led the Lions to a 59–14 victory over the Browns in the 1957 NFL Championship Game. For the second time in his career, Schmidt was selected as the Lions' most valuable player. He was involved in half of the Lions' tackles, including 80 initial tackles and 77 assists in 12 games, was selected as a first-team All-Pro by the AP, UPI, NEA and The Sporting News, and was named the NFL Lineman of the Year in an AP poll of NFL writers.

=== Later years (1958–1965) ===
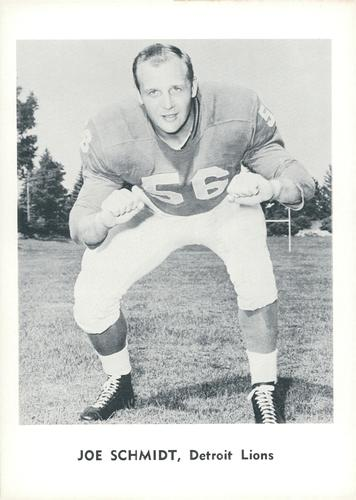
Schmidt in 1961

After serving six months in the United States Army after the 1957 season, Schmidt held out prior to the start of the 1958 season, seeking a 50% salary increase to $18,000. He ultimately signed a one-year contract in late July. After winning the NFL championship in 1957, the 1958 Lions fell to 4–7–1 with a scoring defense ranked seventh of 12 teams in the NFL. Despite the team's decline, Schmidt intercepted a career-high six passes in 1958. He was also selected as the Lions' most valuable player for the third time, played in the Pro Bowl, and was selected by the AP, UPI, NEA, and The Sporting News as a first-team All-Pro player.

The Lions struggles continued in 1959 with a 3–8–1 record and a scoring defense ranked eighth in the league. After the 1959 season, Schmidt once again played in the Pro Bowl and was selected by the AP, UPI, NEA, and The Sporting News as a first-team All-Pro player.

During an exhibition game on September 11, 1960, Schmidt suffered a dislocated right shoulder that caused him to miss the first two games of the regular season. Prior to the injury, Schmidt had played in every game for the Lions for seven consecutive years from 1953 to 1959. He returned to the lineup wearing a restraining harness to protect his shoulder. On October 16, in his first game back from the injury, he intercepted a pass and returned it 17 yards for the first touchdown of his NFL career. The Lions lost the first two games of the season, but went 7–3 after Schmidt returned. After the 1960 season, he played in the Pro Bowl and was selected as a first-team All-Pro by the NEA and Sporting News. He was also voted by the NFL players as the league's most valuable defensive player.

During the 1961 and 1962 seasons, Schmidt appeared in all 28 regular season games for the Lions, as the team improved to 8–5–1 and 11–3, finishing in second place in the NFL Western Division both years. For the fourth time in his career, Schmidt was selected as the Lions' most valuable player in 1961. He played both years in the Pro Bowl and won first-team All-Pro honors in 1961 from the AP, UPI, NEA, and TSN, and in 1962 from the AP, UPI, and NEA.

In April 1963, Schmidt and five other Lions were implicated in a gambling investigation by NFL commissioner Pete Rozelle. Schmidt had placed a $50 bet on the Packers to defeat the Giants in the 1962 NFL Championship Game. Detroit teammate Alex Karras was given an indefinite suspension for his role in the betting; Schmidt and four other Lions were fined $2,000 each. In 1963, Schmidt missed four games with another dislocated shoulder, but still appeared in 10 games and was selected as a first-team All-Pro by the NEA. After the season ended, he played in his tenth consecutive Pro Bowl and was selected for the tenth consecutive year as an All-Pro, receiving first-team honors from the NEA. The NFL players also selected Schmidt as the NFL's most valuable player on defense. Schmidt was paid $22,000 in 1963, making him the club's highest paid defensive player up to that time.

In 1964, Schmidt was limited to nine games. His season ended on November 9 when he sustained yet another dislocated shoulder in a loss to the Packers. After sustaining the injury, Schmidt announced that he intended to retire as a player. However, he quickly rescinded his resignation and stated his intent to attempt a comeback in 1965. In 1965, Schmidt's last as a player, he appeared in all 14 games for the Lions and intercepted four passes, the second highest total of his career. In March 1966, Schmidt announced his retirement as a player. During his 13-year NFL career, Schmidt appeared in 155 games, intercepted 24 passes, and recovered 17 fumbles.

== Coaching career ==
=== Assistant coach (1966) ===
Simultaneously with his retirement as a player, Schmidt was hired as an assistant coach for the 1966 Lions. During the 1966 season, he tutored linebackers Mike Lucci, who became the Lions' most valuable defensive player for three consecutive years, and Wally Hilgenberg, who later played 12 seasons for the Minnesota Vikings. The Lions compiled a 4–9–1 record in 1966.

=== Rebuilding (1967–1968) ===
On January 6, 1967, shortly after the end of the 1966 season, Lions fired head coach Harry Gilmer and signed Schmidt, at age 35, to a five-year, $40,000-a-year contract as Gilmer's replacement. In his first year as head coach, the Lions ended with a 5–7–2 record.

In May 1968, the Lions traded with the Los Angeles Rams for quarterback Bill Munson. During the 1968 season, the Lions compiled a 4–8–2 record. On October 21, 1968, Schmidt was booed by Detroit fans when, after the Lions recovered a fumble at their own 20-yard line with the score tied and 27 seconds left, Schmidt ran out the clock with four running plays instead of going for the win.

Despite the Lions' poor record on the field during Schmidt's first two years as head coach, they made for suitable rebuilding years in the eyes of the public. The Detroit Free Press wrote that Schmidt took over a team that was reportedly "at the depths" and was "charged with rebuilding from the bottom." The Lions rebuilding efforts during the 1967 NFL/AFL draft and 1968 NFL/AFL draft included the selection of two Pro Football Hall of Fame inductees and three NFL Rookie of the Year Award winners. Running back Mel Farr was drafted in the first round of the 1967 draft. Farr played in two Pro Bowls and was selected as the 1967 NFL Offensive Rookie of the Year. Cornerback Lem Barney was picked in the second round of the 1967 draft. Barney played in seven Pro Bowls, was the NFL Defensive Rookie of the Year in 1967, and was later inducted into the Pro Football Hall of Fame. Linebacker Paul Naumoff was selected in the third round of the 1967 draft. Naumoff played linebacker for the Lions for 12 years and played in the 1970 Pro Bowl. Quarterback Greg Landry was drafted in the first round of the 1968 draft. Landry remained with the Lions for 11 seasons, set an NFL record for rushing yards by a quarterback, and concluded his career as the team's second leading career passer behind Bobby Layne. Wide receiver Earl McCullouch was picked in the second round of the 1968 draft. McCulloch was selected as the NFL Offensive Rookie of the Year in 1968, the second consecutive season in which a Lions draftee won the award. Tight end Charlie Sanders was selected in the third round of the 1968 draft. Sanders remained with the Lions for 10 years and was named to the NFL 1970s All-Decade Team and inducted into the Pro Football Hall of Fame.

=== Peak years (1969–1970) ===
In 1969, the Lions opened the season 3–3 but picked up momentum from there, compiling a 6–1–1 record in their final eight games and finishing in second place behind the Vikings. Lem Barney intercepted eight passes, and the defense ranked second in the NFL in scoring defense at 13.4 points per game. Barney received first-team 1969 All-Pro honors, and four Lions (Charlie Sanders, Ed Flanagan, Alex Karras, and Mike Lucci) received second-team honors. On December 14, 1969, just hours after the team upset the Rams, 28–0, Schmidt was arrested at 3 a.m. for driving while intoxicated after allegedly running a red light at 75 miles per hour on Telegraph Road in Southfield, Michigan. Schmidt pleaded guilty to driving while impaired and was fined $150.

Schmidt's best season as the Lions coach was 1970 when the Lions finished 10–4 to make the playoffs for the first time in 13 years. Whereas the 1969 team had been strong defensively and weak on offense, the 1970 team ranked second in the NFL in both scoring defense (14.4 points per game) and scoring offense (24.8 points per game). The most heartbreaking loss came on November 8, when Tom Dempsey of the New Orleans Saints broke an NFL record with a 63-yard field goal to beat the Lions, 19–17, as time expired. On December 14, the Lions defeated the Rams, 28–23, on Monday Night Football in Los Angeles. Bill Munson and Greg Landry shared the quarterback duties for the 1970 Lions, Munson starting eight games and Landry six. The playoff run lasted only one game, however, as the Dallas Cowboys won a defensive battle, 5–0, on December 26. Charlie Sanders received first-team 1970 All-Pro honors, and five Lions (Mel Farr, Ed Flanagan, Paul Naumoff, Lem Barney, and Dick LeBeau) received second-team honors.

=== Final seasons (1971–1972) ===
In July 1971, with one year still remaining on his five-year contract, Schmidt signed a new, three-year contract to serve as the Lions' head coach through the 1973 season at an increased salary estimated at $60,000 per year. The new contract was seen as an endorsement by owner William Clay Ford of Schmidt's rebuilding efforts, leading the team to a 19–8–1 record in the previous two seasons.

The 1971 Lions began the season with high expectations and won four of the first five games. The season took a dramatic downward turn in the sixth game of the season against the Chicago Bears on October 24, 1971. In the final two minutes of the game, Lions wide receiver Chuck Hughes caught a 32-yard pass as the Lions attempted to rally from a five-point deficit. On the next play, Hughes collapsed on the field clutching his chest as he fell. He was given chest compressions by the team doctor and taken to the hospital where he was pronounced dead within an hour. From that game forward, the Lions won only three of the remaining games, lost the final three games, and ended with a disappointing 7–6–1 record.

In 1972, the team improved to 8–5–1 and finished in second place. However, with one game left, team owner William Clay Ford publicly announced his dissatisfaction with the results he had received from the coaching staff and stated that there would be a shakeup of the coaching staff when the season ended. Following Ford's criticism, the Lions smashed the Rams, 34–17, in the final game of the season. After the game, Schmidt told the press: "As far as our season is concerned, it was a very disappointing one. ... At least we improved from last year's 7–6–1 record. The abuse that has been heaped upon us in Detroit is part of the game."

Schmidt resigned as the Lions' head coach on January 12, 1973. At a press conference announcing his decision, Schmidt said, "I really don't enjoy coaching anymore. It got to be a burden more than a fun-loving game. I promised my family and myself when I started coaching that I would get out when it stopped being fun. Unfortunately, it's reached that point." In six years under Schmidt, the Lions compiled a 43–34–7 record and finished in second place each year from 1969 to 1972.

== Head coaching record ==
Team	Year	Regular season					Postseason			
Team	Year	Won	Lost	Ties	Win %	Finish	Won	Lost	Win %	Result
DET	1967	5	7	2	.417	3rd in NFL Central	–	–	–	–
DET	1968	4	8	2	.333	4th in NFL Central	–	–	–	–
DET	1969	9	4	1	.692	2nd in NFL Central	–	–	–	–
DET	1970	10	4	0	.714	2nd in NFC Central	0	1	.000	Lost to Dallas Cowboys in NFC Divisional Game
DET	1971	7	6	1	.538	2nd in NFC Central	–	–	–	–
DET	1972	8	5	1	.607	2nd in NFC Central	–	–	–	–
Total		43	34	7	.558		0	1	.000	

== Legacy and career honors ==
Schmidt was inducted into the Pro Football Hall of Fame in 1973 and the College Football Hall of Fame in 2000. During a time when the Lions were one of the NFL teams that switched to using the 4-3 defense to deal with the increased emphasis on passing, he was credited with revolutionizing the linebacker position with his speed, doing the job formerly performed by middle guards in stopping the run game while also taking the load off the defensive backs on pass defense. Some have credited him with "virtually invent[ing] the middle linebacker position." His biography at the Hall of Fame credits him with a big role in changing defensive play in the NFL:

Without question, he was the first to play the [middle linebacker] position with such finesse that even the masses in the stands could see the growing value of the 'defensive quarterback.' He anticipated plays with uncanny accuracy. He was a deadly tackler. He was fast enough to evade a 250-pound guard, to follow a play along the line or to drop back to cover a pass. He was strong enough to power past a potential blocker to crumble a play. But his greatest talent may well have been his uncanny knack of knowing what the opposition was going to do.

Detroit coach Buddy Parker called Schmidt "one of the surest and hardest tacklers you'll ever see." Even Schmidt's adversaries acknowledged his exceptional talent. Rams' quarterback Norm Van Brocklin said of Schmidt, "If I were to start a team from scratch and pick out just one player, I'd select Joe Schmidt to form the core of my team." Despite playing in the same era as Hall of Fame linebackers Ray Nitschke, Sam Huff, and Bill George, Green Bay's Paul Hornung called Schmidt "the best linebacker in the league." Vince Lombardi said of Schmidt, "He's a cat." John Henry Johnson of San Francisco's "Million Dollar Backfield" complained, "He's always in the way."

In addition to the Pro and College Football Halls of Fame, Schmidt also received numerous other honors. In August 1969, Schmidt was named by the Pro Football Hall of Fame to its NFL 1950s All-Decade Team. Also in 1969, Schmidt was voted the "Greatest Lion Ever" in conjunction with the NFL's 50th anniversary. As a Lion, Schmidt wore number 56, and his number was retired by the Lions. Schmidt personally allowed Pat Swilling to wear the number 56 during Swilling's time with the Lions. No player has worn it since. In May 1970, Schmidt was inducted into the Michigan Sports Hall of Fame. In a 1988 poll of 300 NFL writers, Schmidt was selected as the best defensive player in the history of the Detroit Lions; Bobby Layne was picked as the greatest offensive player. In April 1997, the University of Pittsburgh announced that Schmidt's jersey number 65 would be retired at a ceremony in September 1997. In August 1999, Schmidt was ranked number 65 on The Sporting News' list of the 100 Greatest Football Players. In December 1999, the Detroit Free Press compiled its list of the greatest Michigan sports figures of the 20th century; Schmidt was ranked No. 14. The only other Lions to rank among the top 25 were Barry Sanders (No. 13) and Bobby Layne (No. 7). In November 2019, Schmidt was named a member of the NFL 100th Anniversary All-Time Team.

== Film ==
Schmidt played himself as the coach of the Detroit Lions in the 1968 film Paper Lion, based on the book by George Plimpton.

== Personal life and death ==
In 1959, Schmidt married Marilynn Rotz. They had five children. After retiring from the Lions, Schmidt formed Joe Schmidt Enterprises, a manufacturer's representative firm. He and his staff worked with the automotive suppliers to introduce them to the OEM Automotive Manufacturers and their Tier One suppliers headquartered in and near Detroit.

Schmidt died in Palm Beach Gardens, Florida, on September 11, 2024, at the age of 92.
