= Ken Lee (American football) =

American football player (born 1948)

No. 51, 56
- Position: Linebacker

Personal information
- Born: September 3, 1948 (age 78); Honolulu, Hawaii, U.S.
- Listed height: 6 ft 4 in (1.93 m)
- Listed weight: 230 lb (104 kg)

Career information
- High school: Oak Harbor (Oak Harbor, Washington)
- College: Washington
- NFL draft: 1971: 8th round, 204th overall pick

Career history
- Detroit Lions (1971); Buffalo Bills (1972); Toronto Argonauts (1973); Southern California Sun (1974–1975)

Career NFL statistics
- Sacks: 1
- Interceptions: 6
- Defensive TDs: 1
- Stats at Pro Football Reference

Kenneth Alan Lee (born September 3, 1948) is an American former professional football player who was a linebacker for two seasons in the National Football League (NFL) with the Detroit Lions and Buffalo Bills, one season for the Toronto Argonauts in the Canadian Football League (CFL), and his two final seasons for the Southern California Sun of the World Football League (WFL). He played college football for the Washington Huskies and was selected in the second round of the 1971 NFL draft.

== Early life ==
Lee was born in Honolulu, Hawaii. He attended Oak Harbor High School in Oak Harbor, Washington. In high school, Lee was an all-conference tight end in football (1965), all-conference pitcher in baseball (1965, 1966), and Athlete of the Year (1966). In baseball, he had a 23–4 career record with 15 complete games, with a senior season of 11–2 and a 0.40 ERA.

== College career ==
Lee was a letterman at defensive end for the Washington Huskies in 1967, 1968, and 1970. Following his Washington career, Lee played in the East–West Shrine Game.

== Professional career ==
Lee was selected in the eighth round of the 1971 NFL draft by the Detroit Lions, where he spent the 1971 season. Lee played the next season with the Buffalo Bills, where he recorded six interceptions, which led the team and tied for seventh in the league. In 1973 Lee played for the Toronto Argonauts of the Canadian Football League (CFL). Lee finished his playing careers with the Southern California Sun of the World Football League (WFL) from 1974 to 1975.
