= Mickey Zofko =

American football player (born 1949)

No. 89, 34
- Position: Running back

Personal information
- Born: June 8, 1949 (age 77); Melbourne, Florida, U.S.
- Listed height: 6 ft 3 in (1.91 m)
- Listed weight: 195 lb (88 kg)

Career information
- High school: Melbourne
- College: Auburn
- NFL draft: 1971: 9th round, 229th overall pick

Career history
- Detroit Lions (1971–1974); New York Giants (1974)

Career NFL statistics
- Rushing attempts: 21
- Rushing yards: 67
- Receptions: 7
- Receiving yards: 45
- Stats at Pro Football Reference

Michael Joseph Zofko (born June 8, 1949) is an American former professional football player who was a running back in the National Football League (NFL) for 44 games with the Detroit Lions and New York Giants from 1971 to 1974. Zofko scored one point during his NFL career; in a game against the Chicago Bears on November 5, 1972, Zofko caught a pass from Greg Landry for a successful point after touchdown. He played college football for the Auburn Tigers.
