= Larry Walton =

American football player (born 1947)

No. 49
- Position: Wide receiver

Personal information
- Born: February 8, 1947; Johnstown, Pennsylvania, U.S.
- Died: July 4, 2024 (aged 77); Goodyear, Arizona, U.S.
- Listed height: 6 ft 0 in (1.83 m)
- Listed weight: 180 lb (82 kg)

Career information
- High school: Johnstown
- College: Trinidad; Arizona State
- NFL draft: 1969: 3rd round, 59th overall pick

Career history
- Detroit Lions (1969–1977); Buffalo Bills (1978)

Career NFL statistics
- Receptions: 173
- Receiving yards: 2,689
- Receiving touchdowns: 27
- Stats at Pro Football Reference

Larry James Walton (born February 8, 1947) was an American professional football wide receiver in the National Football League (NFL). He played college football for the Trinidad Trojans and the Arizona State Sun Devils. Walton was selected by the Detroit Lions in the third round of the 1969 NFL/AFL draft. He was also a member of the Buffalo Bills.

== Biography ==
Walton was born in Johnstown, Pennsylvania on February 8, 1947.

He played college football at Trinidad State Junior College in Colorado and at Arizona State University. In November 1967, he tied a Western Athletic Conference record with four touchdowns (three rushing, one receiving) in a game. He gained 719 yards for Arizona State in 1968.

During his eight years in the National Football League, he played for the Detroit Lions, from 1969 to 1974 and again in 1976, and then for the Buffalo Bills in 1978. His best seasons were from 1970 to 1972 when he caught 84 passes for 1,508 yards and 16 touchdowns.

He missed the 1975 season after undergoing knee surgery. He was cut by the Lions on September 12, 1977, later attempting a comeback with the Bills in 1978.

Walton died in Goodyear, Arizona on July 4, 2024 at age 77.

== NFL career statistics ==
Legend
**Bold**	Career high

=== Regular season ===
Year	Team	Games		Receiving				
Year	Team	GP	GS	Rec	Yds	Avg	Lng	TD
1969	DET	14	7	12	109	9.1	16	0
1970	DET	13	11	30	**532**	17.7	56	5
1971	DET	14	14	30	491	16.4	**60**	5
1972	DET	14	9	24	485	**20.2**	48	**6**
1973	DET	13	11	22	309	14.0	49	4
1974	DET	13	12	**31**	404	13.0	48	3
1976	DET	14	13	20	293	14.7	28	3
1978	BUF	12	2	4	66	16.5	32	1
		107	79	173	2,689	15.5	60	27

=== Playoffs ===
Year	Team	Games		Receiving				
Year	Team	GP	GS	Rec	Yds	Avg	Lng	TD
1970	DET	1	1	3	39	13.0	15	0
		1	1	3	39	13.0	15	0
