= Charlie Potts =

American football player (born 1949)

No. 27
- Position: Safety

Personal information
- Born: April 29, 1949 (age 77); Chicago, Illinois, U.S.
- Listed height: 6 ft 3 in (1.91 m)
- Listed weight: 210 lb (95 kg)

Career information
- High school: Dunbar Vocational (Chicago)
- College: Purdue
- NFL draft: 1972: 6th round, 145th overall pick

Career history
- Detroit Lions (1972); St. Louis Cardinals (1974)*; Detroit Lions (1974)*; Winnipeg Blue Bombers (1974)
- * Offseason or practice squad member only
- Stats at Pro Football Reference

Charles Potts (born April 29, 1949) is an American former professional football safety who played for the Detroit Lions of the National Football League (NFL). He played college football for the Purdue Boilermakers and was selected by the Lions in the sixth round of the 1972 NFL draft.

== Early life ==
Charles Potts was born on April 29, 1949, in Chicago, Illinois. He attended Dunbar Vocational High School in Chicago.

== College career ==
Potts enrolled at Purdue University to play college football for the Tigers. He played for the freshman team in 1968 and was a three-year varsity letterman from 1969 to 1971 as an end and defensive back.

== Professional career ==
Potts was selected by the Detroit Lions in the sixth round, with the 145th overall pick, of the 1972 NFL draft. He played in ten games for the Lions during the 1972 season as a reserve safety. On September 1, 1973, it was reported that Potts had been released.

Potts signed with the St. Louis Cardinals in 1974. On August 6, 1974, he was traded to the Lions for cash. He was waived on September 5, 1974.

Potts played in one game for the Winnipeg Blue Bombers of the Canadian Football League in 1974, recording one interception for 53 yards.
