= Bruce Maxwell (American football) =

American football player (born 1947)

No. 46
- Position: Running back

Personal information
- Born: March 23, 1947 (age 79); Crossett, Arkansas, U.S.
- Listed height: 6 ft 1 in (1.85 m)
- Listed weight: 220 lb (100 kg)

Career information
- High school: Pine Bluff
- College: Arkansas
- NFL draft: 1970: 10th round, 253rd overall pick

Career history
- Detroit Lions (1970)
- Stats at Pro Football Reference

Donald Bruce Maxwell (born March 23, 1947) is an American former professional football player who was a running back for the Detroit Lions of National Football League (NFL). He played college football for the University of Arkansas.
