= Sonny Campbell =

American football player (born 1948)

No. 45
- Position: Running back

Personal information
- Born: March 5, 1948; Marana, Arizona, U.S.
- Listed height: 5 ft 11 in (1.80 m)
- Listed weight: 192 lb (87 kg)

Career information
- High school: Marana (AZ)
- College: Northern Arizona
- NFL draft: 1970: undrafted

Career history
- Atlanta Falcons (1970–1971)

Career NFL statistics
- Rushing attempts: 57
- Rushing yards: 195
- Rushing TDs: 2
- Stats at Pro Football Reference

Thee Arthur Campbell (born March 5, 1948) was an American professional football running back in the National Football League (NFL) who played for the Atlanta Falcons. He played college football for the Northern Arizona Lumberjacks.
