= Bill Swain =

American football player (1941–2026)

No. 52, 51
- Position: Linebacker

Personal information
- Born: February 22, 1941; Dickinson, North Dakota, U.S.
- Died: April 24, 2026 (aged 85)
- Listed height: 6 ft 2 in (1.88 m)
- Listed weight: 230 lb (104 kg)

Career information
- High school: North Bend (North Bend, Oregon)
- College: Oregon
- NFL draft: 1963: undrafted

Career history
- Los Angeles Rams (1963); Minnesota Vikings (1964); New York Giants (1965–1967); Detroit Lions (1968–1969); Long Island Bulls (1970); Portland Thunder (1975)*
- * Offseason or practice squad member only

Career NFL statistics
- Interceptions: 2
- Fumble recoveries: 3
- Total touchdowns: 1
- Sacks: 3
- Stats at Pro Football Reference

William Steven Swain (February 22, 1941 – April 24, 2026) was an American professional football player who was a linebacker in the National Football League (NFL) for the Los Angeles Rams, Minnesota Vikings, New York Giants and Detroit Lions from 1963 to 1969. He played college football for the Oregon Ducks.

Swain died from complications of dementia on April 24, 2026, at the age of 85.
