= Dave Haverdick =

American football player (born 1948)

No. 80
- Position: Defensive tackle

Personal information
- Born: January 19, 1948 (age 78); Canton, Ohio, U.S.
- Listed height: 6 ft 4 in (1.93 m)
- Listed weight: 245 lb (111 kg)

Career information
- High school: Glenwood
- College: Morehead State
- NFL draft: 1970: 13th round, 331st overall pick

Career history
- Detroit Lions (1970)

Career NFL statistics
- Games played: 8
- Stats at Pro Football Reference

David George Haverdick (born January 19, 1948) is an American former professional football player who was a defensive tackle for the Detroit Lions of the National Football League (NFL). He played college football for the Morehead State Eagles.
