= Bill Triplett =

American football player (born 1940)

No. 38
- Positions: Running back, Safety

Personal information
- Born: May 9, 1940 (age 86); Indianola, Mississippi, U.S.
- Listed height: 6 ft 2 in (1.88 m)
- Listed weight: 215 lb (98 kg)

Career information
- High school: Girard (Girard, Ohio)
- College: Miami (OH) (1958-1961)
- NFL draft: 1962: 6th round, 72nd overall pick
- AFL draft: 1962: 9th round, 70th overall pick

Career history
- St. Louis Cardinals (1962–1966); New York Giants (1967); Detroit Lions (1968–1972)

Career NFL statistics
- Rushing yards: 2,446
- Rushing average: 3.6
- Receptions: 113
- Receiving yards: 1,055
- Total touchdowns: 22
- Stats at Pro Football Reference

William Clarence Triplett (born May 9, 1940) is an American former professional football player who was a running back in the National Football League (NFL). He also played college football for the Miami RedHawks. Triplett played 10 years in the NFL for the St. Louis Cardinals (1962–63, 1965–66), New York Giants (1967), and Detroit Lions (1968–72).

== Early life ==
Triplett was born in 1940 in Shaw, Mississippi. His family moved to Girard, Ohio, where he attended Girard High School. His older brother, Mel Triplett, played in the NFL as a running back and defensive back from 1955 to 1962.

Triplett attended Miami University in Oxford, Ohio, where he played for the Miami Redskins football team under head coach John Pont. As a senior in 1961, Triplett gained 1,418 yards, was named the team's most valuable player, and was selected to the All-Mid-American Conference team. He was also selected to play in the Hula Bowl and the East–West Shrine Game.

== Professional football ==
Triplett was selected by the New York Giants in the sixth round, 72nd overall pick, of the 1962 NFL draft. He was also selected in the ninth round of the 1962 AFL draft by the Boston Patriots. In May 1962, the Giants traded Triplett to the St. Louis Cardinals in exchange for Ralph Guglielmi.

As a rookie in 1962, Triplett was used principally as a kick return specialist and carried the ball only twice on offense. In 1963, Triplett's second year in the NFL, he gained 1,048 yards from scrimmage, 652 rushing and 396 receiving. He missed the 1964 season after contracting tuberculosis, and seeing his weight drop from 210 to 175 pounds. He returned to the Cardinals' lineup in 1965 and totaled 873 yards from scrimmage, 617 rushing and 256 receiving.

After carrying the ball only eight times for the Cardinals in 1966, Triplett was traded to the New York Giants prior to the 1967 season. He was a backup for the Giants in 1967, gaining 171 rushing yards and 69 receiving yards.

In August 1968, Triplett was traded by the Giants to the Detroit Lions with Bill Swain in exchange for Bruce Maher and two draft choices. Triplett spent five seasons with the Lions from 1968 to 1972. He appeared in 68 games for the Lions, 11 as a starter, and totaled 1,297 yards from scrimmage (969 rushing and 328 receiving).
