= Altie Taylor =

American football player (1947–2010)

No. 42
- Position: Running back

Personal information
- Born: September 29, 1947; Pittsburg, California, U.S.
- Died: March 14, 2010 (aged 62); Sacramento, California, U.S.
- Listed height: 5 ft 10 in (1.78 m)
- Listed weight: 200 lb (91 kg)

Career information
- High school: Pittsburg
- College: Utah State
- NFL draft: 1969: 2nd round, 34th overall pick

Career history
- Detroit Lions (1969–1975); Houston Oilers (1976)

Career NFL statistics
- Rushing yards: 4,308
- Rushing average: 3.7
- Receptions: 175
- Receiving yards: 1,538
- Total touchdowns: 30
- Stats at Pro Football Reference

Altie Taylor (September 29, 1947 – March 14, 2010) was an American professional football running back. He played eight seasons in the National Football League, including seven with the Detroit Lions. He led the Lions in rushing for three consecutive years from 1972 to 1974, appeared in 91 games, 83 as a starter, and in 1975 broke the Lions' career record with 4,297 rushing yards.

== Early life ==
Taylor was born in Berkeley, California, in 1947. He grew up in Pittsburg, California, and attended Pittsburg High School. He began his college career at Diablo Valley College before transferring to Utah State University. He played for the Utah State Aggies football team from 1966 to 1968. As a junior in 1967, he led the country with a kickoff return average of 31.9 yards. In 1968, he rushed for 975 yards. On September 28, 1968, he returned the opening kickoff 98 yards for a touchdown and rushed for 90 yards on 20 carries. In August 1969, he had a 78-yard kickoff return and a 54-yard pass reception in the Chicago College All-Star Game against the Super Bowl champion New York Jets.

== Professional football ==
Taylor was selected by the Detroit Lions in the second round of the 1969 NFL/AFL draft. He played eight years in the NFL, seven of those years for the Lions from 1969 to 1975. During his time with the Lions, Taylor led the team in rushing for three consecutive years from 1972 to 1974, appeared in 91 games, 83 as a starter, and in 1975 broke the Lions' career record with 4,297 rushing yards (surpassing Nick Pietrosante's mark). He was named the Lions' offensive MVP in 1973, a year in which he rushed for 719 yards, including a 160-yard game against the Green Bay Packers on October 28, 1973. Taylor was traded to the Houston Oilers in August 1976, and appeared in 11 games as a backup during the 1976 season. In his eight NFL seasons, Taylor gained 5,846 yards from scrimmage, made up of 4,308 rushing yards and 1,538 receiving yards.

== NFL career statistics ==
Legend
**Bold**	Career high

=== Regular season ===
Year	Team	Games		Rushing					Receiving				
Year	Team	GP	GS	Att	Yds	Avg	Lng	TD	Rec	Yds	Avg	Lng	TD
1969	DET	10	4	118	348	2.9	26	0	13	86	6.6	20	0
1970	DET	14	14	**198**	666	3.4	34	2	27	261	9.7	42	**2**
1971	DET	14	14	174	**736**	4.2	36	4	26	270	**10.4**	**64**	1
1972	DET	13	12	154	658	**4.3**	**38**	4	29	250	8.6	40	**2**
1973	DET	13	13	176	719	4.1	34	**5**	27	252	9.3	35	0
1974	DET	13	12	150	532	3.5	27	**5**	**30**	**293**	9.8	34	1
1975	DET	14	14	195	638	3.3	24	4	21	111	5.3	17	0
1976	HOU	11	0	5	11	2.2	8	0	2	15	7.5	8	0
		102	83	1,170	4,308	3.7	38	24	175	1,538	8.8	64	6

=== Playoffs ===
Year	Team	Games		Rushing					Receiving				
Year	Team	GP	GS	Att	Yds	Avg	Lng	TD	Rec	Yds	Avg	Lng	TD
1970	DET	1	1	9	16	1.8	7	0	2	7	3.5	5	0
		1	1	9	16	1.8	7	0	2	7	3.5	5	0

== Later life ==
In March 2010, Taylor died at age 62 at his home in Sacramento, California.

== See also ==
- List of NCAA major college yearly punt and kickoff return leaders
