= Ray Parson =

American football player (born 1947)

No. 79, 85, 83
- Position: Offensive tackle

Personal information
- Born: May 30, 1947 (age 79); Uniontown, Pennsylvania, U.S.
- Listed height: 6 ft 4 in (1.93 m)
- Listed weight: 245 lb (111 kg)

Career information
- High school: Uniontown
- College: Minnesota (1968-1969)
- NFL draft: 1970: 2nd round, 45th overall pick

Career history
- Detroit Lions (1970–1971); St. Louis Cardinals (1972)*; Charlotte Hornets (1974-1975); Washington Redskins (1975)*
- * Offseason or practice squad member only

Awards and highlights
- Second-team All-American (1969); First-team All-Big Ten (1969); Second-team All-Big Ten (1968)

Career NFL statistics
- Games played: 14
- Stats at Pro Football Reference

Ray A. Parson (born May 30, 1947) is an American former professional football player who was a tackle for the Detroit Lions of the National Football League (NFL). He played college football for the Minnesota Golden Gophers.
