= Bruce Maher =

American football player (1937–2018)

No. 21
- Positions: Safety, cornerback

Personal information
- Born: July 25, 1937; Detroit, Michigan, U.S.
- Died: July 6, 2018 (aged 80); Wauwatosa, Wisconsin, U.S.
- Listed height: 5 ft 11 in (1.80 m)
- Listed weight: 190 lb (86 kg)

Career information
- High school: University of Detroit Jesuit (Detroit)
- College: Detroit Mercy
- NFL draft: 1959: 15th round, 173rd overall pick

Career history
- Detroit Lions (1960–1967); New York Giants (1968–1969)

Career NFL statistics
- Interceptions: 22
- Fumble recoveries: 4
- Safeties: 3
- Stats at Pro Football Reference

Bruce David Maher (/ˈmɑːər/ MAH-ər; July 25, 1937 – July 6, 2018) was an American professional football safety in the National Football League (NFL) for the Detroit Lions and New York Giants. He played college football at the University of Detroit Mercy and was drafted in the 15th round of the 1959 NFL draft.
