= Charlie Brown (wide receiver, born 1948) =

American football player

No. 81
- Position: Wide receiver

Personal information
- Born: October 13, 1948 (age 78); Oakland, California, U.S.
- Listed height: 6 ft 2 in (1.88 m)
- Listed weight: 195 lb (88 kg)

Career information
- High school: Castlemont (Oakland)
- College: Northern Arizona
- NFL draft: 1970: 14th round, 357th overall pick

Career history
- Detroit Lions (1970)

Career NFL statistics
- Games: 14
- Receiving yards: 38
- Receptions: 2
- Stats at Pro Football Reference

Charles Kelly Brown (born October 13, 1948), sometimes misspelled Charles Kerry Brown, and sometimes known by the nickname "Good Grief", is an American former professional football player who was a wide receiver for the Detroit Lions of the National Football League (NFL). He played college football for the Northern Arizona Lumberjacks.

A native of Oakland California, Brown attended Castlemont High School in that city. He began playing college football at Merritt Junior College in Oakland. In 1968, he transferred to Northern Arizona University as a sociology student and a split end for the 1968 and 1969 football teams. During the 1969 season, he broke Northern Arizona single-season records with 63 receptions, 1,134 receiving yards (nearly doubling the prior record of 601 receiving yards), and 11 receiving touchdowns. He also set single-game school records with 12 receptions in one game and 245 receiving yards and three touchdown receptions in another game.

He was selected by the Detroit Lions in the 14th round (357th overall pick) of the 1970 NFL draft and impressed coaches during the Lions' training camp. He appeared in 14 games during the 1970 season, but totaled only two passes for 38 yards. His career was stymied by military service in 1971 and torn cartilage that required surgery on a knee.
