= Bob Bell (American football) =

American football player (born 1948)

No. 73, 79
- Positions: Defensive tackle, defensive end

Personal information
- Born: January 25, 1948 (age 78); Philadelphia, Pennsylvania, U.S.
- Listed height: 6 ft 4 in (1.93 m)
- Listed weight: 250 lb (113 kg)

Career information
- High school: West Philadelphia
- College: Cincinnati
- NFL draft: 1971: 1st round, 21st overall pick

Career history
- Detroit Lions (1971–1973); St. Louis Cardinals (1974–1978)

Awards and highlights
- Second-team All-American (1970)

Career NFL statistics
- Sacks: 28
- Fumble recoveries: 7
- Defensive TDs: 1
- Stats at Pro Football Reference

Robert Francis Bell (born January 25, 1948) is an American former professional football player who was a defensive lineman in the National Football League (NFL) for the Detroit Lions and the St. Louis Cardinals. He played college football at the University of Cincinnati. He played eight years in the NFL from 1971 to 1978.
