= Greg Landry =

American football player and coach (1946–2024)

No. 11
- Position: Quarterback

Personal information
- Born: December 18, 1946; Nashua, New Hampshire, U.S.
- Died: October 4, 2024 (aged 77); Detroit, Michigan, U.S.
- Listed height: 6 ft 4 in (1.93 m)
- Listed weight: 210 lb (95 kg)

Career information
- High school: Nashua (NH)
- College: UMass
- NFL draft: 1968: 1st round, 11th overall pick

Career history

Playing
- Detroit Lions (1968–1978); Baltimore Colts (1979–1981); Chicago Blitz (1983); Arizona Wranglers (1984); Chicago Bears (1984)

Coaching
- Cleveland Browns (1985) Quarterbacks coach; Chicago Bears (1986–1988) Quarterbacks, wide receivers & tight ends coach; Chicago Bears (1988–1992) Offensive coordinator; Illinois (1993–1994) Offensive coordinator; Detroit Lions (1995–1996) Quarterbacks coach

Awards and highlights
- NFL Comeback Player of the Year (1976); First-team All-Pro (1971); Pro Bowl (1971)

Career NFL statistics
- Passing attempts: 2,300
- Passing completions: 1,276
- Completion percentage: 55.5%
- TD–INT: 98–103
- Passing yards: 16,052
- Passer rating: 72.9
- Stats at Pro Football Reference
- Coaching profile at Pro Football Reference

Gregory Paul Landry (December 18, 1946 – October 4, 2024) was an American professional football player who was a quarterback in the National Football League (NFL) and United States Football League (USFL) from 1968 to 1984. He played college football for the UMass Minutemen from 1965 to 1967 and was selected in the first round of the 1968 NFL draft with the 11th overall pick. Landry played in the NFL for the Detroit Lions, Baltimore Colts and Chicago Bears. He became an assistant coach after his playing career. Landry is considered a forerunner of the dual threat quarterback.

== Early life ==
Landry was born on December 18, 1946, in Nashua, New Hampshire to Alvin and Felixa "Fannie" (Worsowicz) Landry, both of whom were factory workers. Fannie's parents had emigrated from Poland. He attended Nashua High School, where he played on the football team, graduating in 1964.

In 1962, as a junior he was selected to the Nashua Telegraph's New Hampshire All-Scholastic football team. He was co-captain of the football team in his senior year, and received the Buddy Harvey trophy after his teammates selected him as Most Valuable Player. He also starred in baseball and was named the school's Athlete of the Year in 1964.

Landry also played shortstop in American Legion baseball. He was considered a fine major league prospect in baseball.

== College ==
Landry earned a scholarship to the University of Massachusetts (UMass). The UMass team won two Yankee Conference championships, with Landry leading the conference in both rushing and passing twice. Landry still has the school record for quarterback efficiency rating, 145.4, set in 1965. The team's record with Landry was 20–7, and 14–1 in the Yankee Conference.

In December 1967, he played in the North-South Shrine Game before the 1968 draft, and drew attention for playing well in the game against other college all stars. He was in the 1968 Chicago Charities All Star Game, playing with the collegians against the NFL champion Green Bay Packers. Landry threw a touchdown pass to future Lions teammate Earl McCullough.

Landry was selected to the All-Yankee Conference team for two seasons. In 1967, he received the George Bulger Lowe Award from the Gridiron Club of Boston as the outstanding college football player in New England. In 1980, he was inducted into the UMass Hall of Fame. In 1996, he was named to the Yankee Conference 50th Anniversary Team.

== Playing career ==
=== Detroit Lions ===
Landry was selected in the first round of the 1968 NFL/AFL draft (eleventh overall) by the Detroit Lions, and was the first quarterback taken in that draft. No UMass player has ever been drafted higher. With the Lions in 1971, he passed for 2,237 yards and 16 touchdowns, was named first-team All-Pro, and went to his only Pro Bowl that year. In 1976, Landry passed for 2,191 yards and 17 touchdowns and was named the NFL's Comeback Player of the Year. He was benched by Lions head coach Tommy Hudspeth late in 1977 and supplanted by Gary Danielson as the starting quarterback the following season.

Landry's request to be traded was granted when he was acquired by the Colts from the Lions for fourth- and fifth-round selections in 1979 (Note: 88th and 131st overall–Ulysses Norris and Pittsburgh center Walt Brown respectively) and a 1980 third-round pick (Note: 62nd overall–Mike Friede) on April 29, 1979. During his eleven seasons with the Lions, he had a 40–41–3 record, and passed for 12,451 yards and 80 touchdowns. Landry ranked second in quarterback wins for the Lions to Bobby Layne, while only Matthew Stafford and Jared Goff have since passed him.

=== Baltimore Colts, USFL, and Chicago Bears ===
During his three seasons with the Colts, he played brilliantly in 1979 despite a 5–11 record, after a season-ending injury to starting quarterback Bert Jones. Landry passed for a career best 2,932 yards and 15 touchdowns that season. He then played for George Allen on the Chicago Blitz and Arizona Wranglers in the United States Football League (USFL) in 1983 and 1984. He started one game as an emergency quarterback for the Chicago Bears in 1984 before retiring as a player.

== Legacy ==
Landry was also notable as a rusher; in the 1970 opener at Green Bay, he ran for 76 yards on a quarterback sneak, which was for a time the longest rush by a quarterback in NFL history. Over his entire career, Landry passed for 16,052 yards, had 98 touchdown passes and 103 interceptions; and he rushed for another 2,655 yards and 21 touchdowns. He exceeded 500 yards on the ground in both 1971 and 1972, as well as averaging ten yards per carry in 1970, and scoring nine touchdowns in 1972. He ranks fifth on the all-time Lions career passing yardage list (12,451), and ranks fourth in touchdown passes with 80.

Landry is considered a forerunner of the modern dual threat quarterbacks, who are both runners and passers. There were running quarterbacks in his era who could scramble and run when a play broke down, such as Fran Tarkenton; but unlike those quarterbacks, the Lions designed running plays for the 6 feet 4 inches (193 cm) and physically imposing Landry. The Lions even ran option plays with his Lions running backs Steve Owens and Altie Taylor. In 1971, Sports Illustrated writer Tex Maule said Landry "probably has ... the pro offense of the future, only he has it right now."

== Coaching career ==
Landry began his coaching career in 1985 handling the Cleveland Browns quarterbacks, and later joined Mike Ditka's staff as quarterback coach in 1986, following the Bears' rout of the New England Patriots in Super Bowl XX. With the Bears, he was also the wide receivers and tight ends coach before taking over as offensive coordinator from 1988 to 1992.

Following the 1992 season, Landry was hired as the offensive coordinator at the University of Illinois at Urbana–Champaign for two seasons. The 1994 Illinois Fighting Illini had the second-best passing offense in the Big Ten Conference, which carried the team to a 30–0 win in the 1994 Liberty Bowl over East Carolina.

The following year, Landry returned to the Lions as quarterbacks coach, helping them to become the top offensive unit in the NFL and guiding Scott Mitchell to record-setting passing numbers that season. He retired from coaching after the 1996 season to become a local radio host.

== Personal life ==
Landry met his wife Jeannine Burger at UMass. She was a gymnast and led UMass to a national gymnastics title in 1973. She was a two time All-American and the first female All-American at UMass. In 1981, she was the first female inducted into the UMass Hall of Fame. They had been married 47 years at the time of his death. They have five children and 18 grandchildren. From 2000 to 2021, Landry and his son Greg Jr. operated a manufacturer's representative business for automotive suppliers.

== Death ==
Landry died in Detroit on October 4, 2024, at the age of 77.

== NFL career statistics ==
Legend
	Led the league
**Bold**	Career high

Year	Team	Games			Passing									Rushing				
Year	Team	GP	GS	Record	Cmp	Att	Pct	Yds	Avg	Lng	TD	Int	Rtg	Att	Yds	Avg	Lng	TD
1968	DET	4	2	0–2	23	48	47.9	338	7.0	80	2	7	45.7	7	39	5.6	14	1
1969	DET	10	7	5–2	80	160	50.0	853	5.3	43	4	10	48.3	33	243	7.4	26	1
1970	DET	12	6	5–1	83	136	61.0	1,072	7.9	58	9	5	**92.5**	35	350	10.0	**76**	1
1971	DET	14	14	7–6–1	136	261	52.1	2,237	8.6	76	16	13	80.9	76	**530**	7.0	52	3
1972	DET	14	14	**8–5–1**	134	268	50.0	2,066	7.7	82	**18**	**17**	71.8	**81**	524	6.5	38	**9**
1973	DET	7	7	2–4–1	70	128	54.7	908	7.1	**84**	3	10	52.5	42	267	6.4	18	2
1974	DET	5	3	1–2	49	82	59.8	572	7.0	45	3	3	77.9	22	95	4.3	19	1
1975	DET	6	3	2–1	31	56	55.4	403	7.2	36	1	0	84.2	20	92	4.6	14	0
1976	DET	14	12	5–7	168	291	57.7	2,191	7.5	74	17	8	89.6	43	234	5.4	28	1
1977	DET	11	11	4–7	135	240	56.3	1,359	5.7	39	6	7	68.7	25	99	4.0	13	0
1978	DET	5	5	1–4	48	77	**62.3**	452	5.9	20	1	1	77.4	5	29	5.8	19	0
1979	BAL	**16**	12	2–10	**270**	**457**	59.1	**2,932**	6.4	67	15	15	75.3	31	115	3.7	17	0
1980	BAL	**16**	1	1–0	24	47	51.1	275	5.9	32	2	3	56.6	7	26	3.7	14	1
1981	BAL	11	0	–	14	29	48.3	195	6.7	34	0	1	56.0	1	11	**11.0**	11	0
1984	CHI	1	1	1–0	11	20	55.0	199	**10.0**	55	1	3	66.5	2	1	0.5	1	1
Career		146	98	44–51–3	1,276	2,300	55.5	16,052	7.0	84	98	103	72.9	430	2,655	6.2	76	21

== Honors ==
In 2012, Landry was inducted into the National Polish-American Sports Hall of Fame, with former Lions teammate and Pro Football Hall of Fame receiver Charlie Sanders giving the induction speech.
