= Gordon Jolley =

American football player (born 1949)

No. 64
- Positions: Guard, tackle

Personal information
- Born: May 22, 1949 (age 77); Provo, Utah, U.S.
- Listed height: 6 ft 5 in (1.96 m)
- Listed weight: 250 lb (113 kg)

Career information
- High school: Granite (South Salt Lake, Utah)
- College: Utah
- NFL draft: 1971: 17th round, 436th overall pick

Career history
- Detroit Lions (1972–1975); Seattle Seahawks (1976–1977)

Career NFL statistics
- Games played: 59
- Games started: 24
- Stats at Pro Football Reference

Gordon Harold Jolley (born May 22, 1949) is an American former professional football player who played in seven National Football League (NFL) seasons from 1971 to 1977 for the Detroit Lions and Seattle Seahawks. He was an inaugural member of the Seattle Seahawks. He was also a prep All-American his senior year (1967) in basketball at Granite High in South Salt Lake, Utah.

Jolley's youngest son, Doug Jolley, played five seasons in the NFL.

Jolley currently teaches Math at Dixie State College of Utah where he was previously the offensive coordinator and offensive line coach for the football team for 21 years. He was also head coach of the baseball team for 10 years. His baseball teams won the Region 19 championship four years and played in the Junior College World Series twice, in 1989 and 1995.

In 2008, Jolley was inducted into the Utah Sports Hall of Fame.

Jolley is a member of the Church of Jesus Christ of Latter-day Saints, and has served as a member of a stake high council.
