= Phil Odle =

American football player (1942–2006)

No. 23
- Position: Wide receiver

Personal information
- Born: November 23, 1942; Macedonia, Illinois, U.S.
- Died: July 27, 2006 (aged 63); Orem, Utah, U.S.
- Listed height: 5 ft 11 in (1.80 m)
- Listed weight: 195 lb (88 kg)

Career information
- High school: Elgin (Elgin, Illinois)
- College: BYU
- NFL draft: 1968: 5th round, 120th overall pick

Career history
- Detroit Lions (1968–1970)

Awards and highlights
- Third-team All-American (1967); WAC Lineman of the Year (1965)

Career NFL statistics
- Games played: 31
- Receptions: 8
- Receiving Yards: 95
- Stats at Pro Football Reference

Phillip Morris Odle (November 23, 1942 – July 27, 2006) was an American professional football wide receiver who played in the National Football League (NFL) for the Detroit Lions from 1968 to 1970.

He died on July 27, 2006, at the age of 63 from chronic lung problems.
