= Larry Woods =

American football player (born 1948)

No. 70, 72
- Position: Defensive tackle

Personal information
- Born: May 11, 1948 (age 78); Rogersville, Alabama, U.S.
- Listed height: 6 ft 6 in (1.98 m)
- Listed weight: 260 lb (118 kg)

Career information
- High school: Rogersville (AL)
- College: Tennessee State
- NFL draft: 1971: 4th round, 100th overall pick

Career history
- Detroit Lions (1971–1972); Miami Dolphins (1973); New York Jets (1974–1975); Seattle Seahawks (1976)

Career NFL statistics
- Sacks: 5
- Fumble recoveries: 1
- Stats at Pro Football Reference

Larry Dobie Woods (born May 11, 1948) is an American former professional football player who played as a defensive tackle in the National Football League (NFL). He played for the Detroit Lions in 1971 and 1972, Miami Dolphins in 1973, New York Jets in 1974 and 1975, and Seattle Seahawks in 1976.
