= Bobby Williams (defensive back) =

American football player (1942–2012)

No. 45
- Positions: Defensive back, Return specialist

Personal information
- Born: February 28, 1942; Geiger, Alabama, U.S.
- Died: August 10, 2012 (aged 70); Oklahoma City, Oklahoma, U.S.
- Listed height: 6 ft 0 in (1.83 m)
- Listed weight: 205 lb (93 kg)

Career information
- High school: Lincoln (NE)
- College: Central State (OK)
- NFL draft: 1966: 11th round, 163rd overall pick

Career history
- St. Louis Cardinals (1966–1967); Detroit Lions (1969–1971)

Career NFL statistics
- Total return yards: 1,934
- Return average: 25.1
- Interceptions: 3
- Total touchdowns: 2
- Stats at Pro Football Reference

Bobby Williams (February 28, 1942 – August 10, 2012) was an American professional football player who played five seasons in the National Football League (NFL), for the St. Louis Cardinals and the Detroit Lions. Williams was mostly known as a return specialist, and at different times in his career also played running back and defensive back.

== Early life ==
Williams was born in Geiger, Alabama and grew up in Lincoln, Nebraska. He attended Lincoln High School where he participated in a variety of sports. He set Nebraska state records in the 100 yard dash and the long jump, the latter of which was later broken by Gale Sayers. He would attend Central State College in Edmond, Oklahoma. He played running back on the Central State Bronchos football team. He had 3,094 all-purpose yards, and still holds the school record for kick return yards at 1,063. He also helped the Bronchos win the 1962 NAIA Football National Championship.

== NFL career ==
Williams was drafted by the St. Louis Cardinals in the 11th round and 163rd pick overall of the 1966 NFL draft. He spent two years in St. Louis, before being traded to the Detroit Lions. He would play with the Lions for three more seasons. He would finish with 3 interceptions, and 2 kickoff return touchdowns.
