= Jim Mitchell (defensive lineman) =

American football player (1948–2026)

No. 83
- Positions: Defensive end, defensive tackle

Personal information
- Born: September 15, 1948; Danville, Virginia, U.S.
- Died: June 20, 2026 (aged 77)
- Listed height: 6 ft 3 in (1.91 m)
- Listed weight: 245 lb (111 kg)

Career information
- High school: John M. Langston (Danville)
- College: Virginia State
- NFL draft: 1970: 3rd round, 71st overall pick

Career history
- Detroit Lions (1970–1977)

Career NFL statistics
- Sacks: 18
- Fumble recoveries: 4
- Interceptions: 1
- Stats at Pro Football Reference

James Halcot Mitchell (September 15, 1948 – June 20, 2026) was an American professional football player who was a defensive end for eight seasons with the Detroit Lions in the National Football League (NFL). He played college football for the Virginia State Trojans. Mitchell died on June 20, 2026, at the age of 77.
