= Rocky Rasley =

American football player (born 1947)

No. 67, 66, 63
- Position: Guard

Personal information
- Born: April 27, 1947 (age 79); Bakersfield, California, U.S.
- Listed height: 6 ft 3 in (1.91 m)
- Listed weight: 252 lb (114 kg)

Career information
- High school: South (Bakersfield)
- College: Oregon State (1967–1968)
- NFL draft: 1969: 9th round, 216th overall pick

Career history
- Detroit Lions (1969–1973); New Orleans Saints (1974); Kansas City Chiefs (1975); San Francisco 49ers (1976)

Awards and highlights
- First-team All-Pac-8 (1968); Oregon Sports Hall of Fame (1967 OSU Football Team); Kern County Sports Hall of Fame

Career NFL statistics
- Games played: 74
- Games started: 17
- Stats at Pro Football Reference

Rocky Rasley (born April 27, 1947) is an American former professional football player who was a guard in the National Football League (NFL) from 1969 to 1976. He attended Bakersfield's South High School and Bakersfield College before playing college football for the Oregon State Beavers under Dee Andros during the "Giant Killers" season of 1967. The entire 1967 squad was later inducted into the Oregon Sports Hall of Fame. Rasley was also inducted into the Bob Elias Kern County Sports Hall of Fame.

Rasley was one of five Beavers selected in the 1969 NFL/AFL draft, and was selected in the ninth round (216th overall) by the Detroit Lions. He played with the Lions for the 1969 and 1970 seasons, was on the Lions' taxi-squad during 1971, and rejoined the team for the 1972 and 1973 seasons. He then went to the New Orleans Saints for a season, followed by a season with the Kansas City Chiefs. Rasley was selected by the Seattle Seahawks in the 1976 NFL expansion draft, but did not make the active roster and wound up playing for the San Francisco 49ers his last season.

Prior to joining the NFL, Rasley was a competitive wrestler. He finished 6th in the heavyweight (+100 kg) weight class at the 1969 FILA Wrestling World Championships in freestyle wrestling. Rasley also wrestled for the Oregon State Beavers wrestling team, and was a letterman in 1968.
