= Craig Cotton =

American football player (1947–2013)

No. 87, 80, 88, 81
- Position: Tight end

Personal information
- Born: July 7, 1947; Elizabeth, Pennsylvania, U.S.
- Died: December 21, 2013 (aged 66); Fresno, California, U.S.
- Listed height: 6 ft 5 in (1.96 m)
- Listed weight: 216 lb (98 kg)

Career information
- High school: Elizabeth Forward (PA)
- College: Youngstown State (1965–1968)
- NFL draft: 1969: 8th round, 200th overall pick

Career history
- San Diego Chargers (1969)*; Detroit Lions (1969–1972); Chicago Bears (1973); New England Patriots (1974)*; Portland Storm (1974); San Diego Chargers (1975)
- * Offseason or practice squad member only

Career NFL statistics
- Receptions: 28
- Receiving yards: 409
- Touchdowns: 1
- Stats at Pro Football Reference

Craig Lee Cotton (July 7, 1947 – December 21, 2013) was an American professional football tight end who played six seasons in the National Football League (NFL) with the Detroit Lions, Chicago Bears and San Diego Chargers. He was selected by the Chargers in the eighth round of the 1969 NFL/AFL draft after playing college football at Youngstown State University. Cotton also played for the Portland Storm of the World Football League (WFL).

== Early life and college ==
Craig Lee Cotton was born on July 7, 1947, in Elizabeth, Pennsylvania. He attended Elizabeth Forward High School in Elizabeth.

He lettered for the Youngstown State Penguins from 1965 to 1968.

== Professional career ==
Cotton was selected by the San Diego Chargers in the eighth round, with the 200th overall pick, of the 1969 NFL draft, but was later released.

He signed with the Detroit Lions in 1969 and played in 13 games for the team during his rookie year without catching any passes. He played in all 14 games for the Lions in 1970, catching one pass for six yards. Cotton also appeared in one playoff game during the 1970 season. He played in all 14 games again, starting two, during the 1971 season, recording six receptions for 88 yards. He played in all 14 games for the third consecutive season, starting six, in 1972, totaling eight catches for 129 yards and one touchdown.

On January 30, 1973, the Lions traded Cotton and a 1973 first-round draft pick to the Chicago Bears for a 1973 first-round and a 1973 third-round draft pick. He appeared in 13 games, all starts, for the Bears in 1973, catching 13 passes for 186 yards. He was waived in 1974.

Cotton was claimed off waivers by the New England Patriots on September 2, 1974. He was released on September 11, 1974.

Cotton later played for the Portland Storm of the World Football League (WFL) during the 1974 WFL season, totaling eight receptions for 94 yards.

He signed with the San Diego Chargers on March 17, 1975. He played in nine games during the 1975 season but did not record a reception. He was released by the Chargers on November 27, 1975.

== Personal and later life ==
Cotton's brother, Lance Cotton, played football at Central State University and spent time in the NFL with the Los Angeles Rams, Chicago Bears, and Denver Broncos, although he did not appear in an NFL game.

Cotton died on December 21, 2013, in Fresno, California.
