= Ed Mooney =

American football player (born 1945)

No. 62, 58
- Position: Linebacker

Personal information
- Born: February 26, 1945 (age 81); Brooklyn, New York, U.S.
- Listed height: 6 ft 2 in (1.88 m)
- Listed weight: 225 lb (102 kg)

Career information
- High school: Wallkill (NY)
- College: Texas Tech
- NFL draft: 1968: 4th round, 93rd overall pick

Career history
- Detroit Lions (1968–1971); Baltimore Colts (1973); Houston Texans (WFL) (1974)

Awards and highlights
- First-team All-SWC (1967)

Career NFL statistics
- Games played: 69
- Games started: 0
- Fumble recoveries: 3
- Stats at Pro Football Reference

Edward John Mooney (born February 26, 1945) is an American former professional football player who was a linebacker for five seasons with the Detroit Lions and Baltimore Colts of the National Football League (NFL). He played college football for the Texas Tech Red Raiders and was selected by the Lions in the fourth round (93rd overall) of the 1968 NFL draft.

== College career ==
Edward came to Tech on a track scholarship from Scottsbluff Junior College in Scottsbluff, Nebraska. Tech track and field coach Vernon Hilliard recruited him, and a football assistant, seeing Mooney's 6–3, 245-pound stature, talked him into making time for both sports. In college, Mooney played football and was on the track team for Texas Technological College (now Texas Tech University). Mooney was an all-SWC linebacker for Tech in 1967, using that as a springboard to play in the East-West Shrine Game

== Professional career ==
Playing linebacker during his five years in the league, Mooney played his first four seasons with the Lions, and finished his final season with the Colts. He also played for the Houston Texans of the World Football League.
