= Frank Gallagher (American football) =

American football player (1943–2021)

Profile
- Position: Guard

Personal information
- Born: March 2, 1943; Chester, Pennsylvania, U.S.
- Died: November 26, 2021 (aged 78)

Career information
- College: North Carolina
- NFL draft: 1967

Career history
- 1967–1972: Detroit Lions
- 1973: Atlanta Falcons
- 1973: Minnesota Vikings/NE Patriots
- 1974: Philadelphia Bell

Awards and highlights
- 2× Pro Bowl
- Stats at Pro Football Reference

Frank Gallagher (March 2, 1943 – November 26, 2021) was an American professional football player who played guard in the National Football League for eight seasons for the Detroit Lions, the Atlanta Falcons and the Minnesota Vikings. He was born in Chester, Pennsylvania and attended St. James High School for Boys in Chester.

Gallagher was also the Owner of the Bullpen Baseball Academy in Novi, Michigan.
