= Mike Weger =

American football player (born 1945)

No. 28
- Position: Safety

Personal information
- Born: October 2, 1945 (age 81); Dallas, Texas, U.S.
- Listed height: 6 ft 2 in (1.88 m)
- Listed weight: 200 lb (91 kg)

Career information
- High school: Bowling Green (Bowling Green, Ohio)
- College: Bowling Green
- NFL draft: 1967: 9th round, 218th overall pick

Career history
- Detroit Lions (1967–1975); Houston Oilers (1976–1977)

Awards and highlights
- Second-team All-American (1965)

Career NFL statistics
- Interceptions: 17
- Fumble recoveries: 6
- Touchdowns: 2
- Sacks: 3.5
- Stats at Pro Football Reference

Michael Roy Weger (born October 2, 1945) is an American former professional football player who was defensive back for the Detroit Lions and the Houston Oilers of the National Football League (NFL). He played college football for the Bowling Green Falcons.

== College career ==
Weger and his family moved to Bowling Green, Ohio, when he was in seventh grade. He stayed in town to play collegiate football at Bowling Green State University. There, Weger played for coach Doyt Perry and was part of the 1965 Mid-American Conference championship team. After his senior season, he participated in the Senior Bowl and the Blue–Gray Football Classic.

== Professional career ==
Weger was drafted by the Detroit Lions in the 1967 NFL/AFL draft in the ninth round, the 218th pick overall.

Weger played safety for the Lions from 1967 to 1975, and with the Houston Oilers from 1976 to 1977. He was twice named honorable mention All-Pro by the Associated Press. He finished his career with 17 interceptions, six fumble recoveries and scored two defensive touchdowns.

He also played a small part as himself in the 1968 film Paper Lion. He sang the unofficial BGSU Fight Song "Ay-Ziggy-Zoomba" in the film.

Weger is currently involved in real estate development. For a time he operated a golf driving range and recreation center on M-24 in Lake Orion, Michigan, which also served as a location for Detroit Lions special events..

Mike Weger was involved in land swap at M-24 and Scripps Road to clear cut and develop previously state owned land. The land swap was deemed controversial and took several years of fighting with local city officials to go through.
