= Detroit Lions all-time roster (Lat–Z) =

2,020 players have appeared in at least one regular season or postseason game in the National Football League (NFL) for the Detroit Lions franchise since 1928. This list includes those whose last names fall between "Lat" and "Z". For the rest, see Detroit Lions all-time roster (A–Las). This list is accurate through the end of the 2025 NFL season. The Lions franchise was founded in Portsmouth, Ohio, as the Portsmouth Spartans. In 1934, the franchise moved to Detroit and changed their name to the Lions, which was a play on the name of the Detroit Tigers.

== Lat-Ly ==
- Al Latimer
- Burton Lawless
- Nevin Lawson
- Russ Lay
- Bob Layden
- Bobby Layne
- Les Lear
- Dick LeBeau
- Cre'Von LeBlanc
- Jeremiah Ledbetter
- Biff Lee
- Edward Lee
- Elijah Lee
- Eric Lee
- Gary Lee
- Ken Lee
- Khari Lee
- Larry Lee
- Monte Lee
- Pat Lee
- Gil LeFebvre
- Clyde LeForce
- Teddy Lehman
- Tim Lelito
- Jessie Lemonier
- Paris Lenon
- Tony Leonard
- Mikel Leshoure
- DeAndre Levy
- Alex Lewis
- Dan Lewis
- David Lewis
- Eddie Lewis
- Mark Lewis
- Ronnell Lewis
- Tiny Lewis
- Travis Lewis
- Alva Liles
- Sonny Liles
- Jeremy Lincoln
- Luke Lindon
- Jack Lininger
- Jack Linn
- Augie Lio
- David Little
- Jody Littleton
- Dave Lloyd
- Jeff Locke
- Danny Lockett
- Andy Logan
- Stefan Logan
- John Lomakoski
- Antonio London
- Bob Long
- Chuck Long
- David Long Jr.
- Ken Long
- Louie Long
- Steve Longa
- Joe Don Looney
- Daniel Loper
- Roy Lopez
- Josh Lovelady
- David Loverne
- Dominic Lovett
- Gary Lowe
- Jackie Lowther
- Chase Lucas
- Cornelius Lucas
- Mike Lucci
- Derrel Luce
- Father Lumpkin
- Bob Lusk
- Dave Lutz
- Todd Lyght
- Eric Lynch
- Babe Lyon

== M ==
- Mike Machurek
- Milton Mack
- Jack Mackenroth
- Elmer Madarik
- Avonte Maddox
- Anthony Madison
- Joe Maese
- Chick Maggioli
- Dante Magnani
- Bruce Maher
- Christian Mahogany
- Gil Mains
- Don Majkowski
- Bill Malinchak
- Robert Malone
- Van Malone
- Pete Mandley
- Bob Mann
- Errol Mann
- Giovanni Manu
- Marquand Manuel
- Baptiste Manzini
- Joseph Manzo
- Joe Margucci
- Brock Marion
- Mark Markovich
- Dean Marlowe
- Steve Maronic
- Bradley Marquez
- Amos Marsh
- Brodric Martin
- Jim Martin
- Kareem Martin
- Marcus Martin
- Robbie Martin
- Sam Martin
- Glenn Martinez
- Phil Martinovich
- Robert Massey
- Jack Matheson
- Riley Matheson
- Ned Mathews
- Rashean Mathis
- Trevor Matich
- Tony Matisi
- Ollie Matson
- Aubrey Matthews
- Michael Matthews
- Jack Mattiford
- Arthur Maulet
- Earl Maves
- Bruce Maxwell
- Vernon Maxwell
- Emil Mayer
- Vince Mazza
- Jerry Mazzanti
- Turk McBride
- Reese McCall
- John McCambridge
- Marcus McCauley
- Willie McClung
- Andy McCollum
- Ryan McCollum
- Darris McCord
- Kez McCorvey
- Josh McCown
- Joel McCoy
- Mike McCoy
- Prentice McCray
- Earl McCullouch
- Lloyd McDermott
- Brandon McDonald
- James McDonald
- Jim McDonald
- Keith McDonald
- Les McDonald
- Mike McDonald
- Shaun McDonald
- Bob McDonough
- Stockar McDougle
- George McDuffie
- Hugh McElhenny
- Ray McElroy
- Willie McGee
- Jon McGraw
- Mike McGraw
- Thurman "Fum" McGraw
- Sean McHugh
- Don McIlhenny
- Hugh McInnis
- Rocky McIntosh
- Bill McKalip
- J. D. McKissic
- Dennis McKnight
- Tim McKyer
- Mayes McLain
- Thomas McLemore
- Bruce McLenna
- Mike McMahon
- John McMakin
- Danny McMullen
- Ryan McNeil
- Alim McNeill
- Bruce McNorton
- Jerris McPhail
- Jake McQuaide
- R. W. McQuarters
- Tony McRae
- Bill McWilliams
- Mike Meade
- Jamie Meder
- Jackson Meeks
- Ifeatu Melifonwu
- Mike Melinkovich
- Jim Mello
- Rashaan Melvin
- John Mendenhall
- Dick Mesak
- Max Messner
- Pete Metzelaars
- Ernie Meyer
- Brandon Middleton
- Dave Middleton
- Brian Mihalik
- Steve Mike-Mayer
- Andy Miketa
- Bill Miklich
- Archie Milano
- Darryl Milburn
- Glyn Milburn
- Joe Milinichik
- Blake Miller
- Bob Miller
- Dutch Miller
- John Miller
- Justin Miller
- Prince Miller
- Terry Miller
- Dick Mills
- Jalen Mills
- John Misko
- Buster Mitchell
- Devon Mitchell
- James Mitchell
- Jim Mitchell
- Melvin Mitchell
- Pete Mitchell
- Scott Mitchell
- Stacey Mobley
- John Mohring
- Alex Molden
- Bob Momsen
- Regis Monahan
- David Montgomery
- Greg Montgomery
- Jim Montgomery
- Wilbert Montgomery
- Mike Montler
- Ed Mooney
- Alvin Moore
- Bill Moore
- C. J. Moore
- Denis Moore
- Derrick Moore
- Herman Moore
- Lance Moore
- Langston Moore
- Paul Moore
- Jack Morlock
- Earl Morrall
- Glen Morris
- Jon Morris
- Maurice Morris
- Randall Morris
- Don Morrison
- Butch Morse
- Johnnie Morton
- Monk Moscrip
- Emmanuel Moseley
- C. J. Mosley
- Martin Moss
- Zefross Moss
- Kelley Mote
- Parnell Motley
- Steve Mott
- Garvin Mugg
- Al-Quadin Muhammad
- Don Muhlbach
- Edwin Mulitalo
- Matthew Mulligan
- Bill Munson
- Art Murakowski
- Jerome Murphy
- Matt Murphy
- Eddie Murray
- Leonard Myers
- Tom Myers
- Alexander Myres

== N ==
- Dick Nardi
- Paul Naumoff
- Isaac Nauta
- Ryan Nece
- Matt Nelson
- Robert Nelson
- Nate Ness
- Haloti Ngata
- Mark Nichols
- Ben Niemann
- Michael Niese
- Reed Nilsen
- Jim Ninowski
- Bob Niziolek
- Niko Noga
- John Noppenberg
- Jake Nordin
- Moran Norris
- Morice Norris
- Ulysses Norris
- Dennis Northcutt
- Doug Nott
- Ray Novotny
- Trevor Nowaske
- Tom Nowatzke
- Ogemdi Nwagbuo

== O ==
- Brad Oates
- Dunc Obee
- Bill O'Brien
- Jim O'Brien
- Pat O'Connor
- Phil Odle
- Tony Office
- Rick Ogle
- Kevin Ogletree
- Jeff Okudah
- Julian Okwara
- Romeo Okwara
- Michael Ola
- Chris Oldham
- Ray Oldham
- Mitch Olenski
- Brock Olivo
- Johnny Olszewski
- Ed O'Neil
- Bill O'Neill
- Kevin O'Neill
- Levi Onwuzurike
- Ed Opalewski
- Dan Orlovsky
- Greg Orton
- Amani Oruwariye
- Herb Orvis
- Kassim Osgood
- J. T. O'Sullivan
- Don Overton
- Dan Owens
- John Owens
- Montell Owens
- Steve Owens
- Akwasi Owusu-Ansah
- Devine Ozigbo

== P ==
- Tony Paige
- Carl Painter
- Ashlee Palmer
- Paul Palmer
- Don Panciera
- John Panelli
- Ben Paolucci
- Bubba Paris
- A. J. Parker
- Buddy Parker
- Willie Parker
- Dave Parkin
- Ray Parson
- Lloyd Parsons
- Josh Paschal
- Bear Pascoe
- Tim Patrick
- Maury Patt
- Don Patterson
- Riley Patterson
- Ted Pavelec
- Charlie Payne
- Eddie Payton
- Dave Pearson
- Kalvin Pearson
- Lindy Pearson
- Cedric Peerman
- Rodney Peete
- Kyle Peko
- John Penisini
- Donovan Peoples-Jones
- Paul Perkins
- Brett Perriman
- Gerry Perry
- Wally Pesuit
- Lawrence Pete
- Stephen Peterman
- Floyd Peters
- Frosty Peters
- Ike Petersen
- Adrian Peterson
- Julian Peterson
- Les Peterson
- Will Peterson
- Brandon Pettigrew
- Jason Phillips
- Randy Phillips
- Bob Picard
- Bob Pickard
- Milt Piepul
- Ross Pierschbacher
- Reggie Pierson
- Nick Pietrosante
- Bob Pifferini, Sr.
- John Pingel
- Cleveland Pinkney
- Jared Pinkney
- Reggie Pinkney
- Artose Pinner
- Lenzy Pipkins
- Anthony Pittman
- Milt Plum
- John Polanski
- Marcus Pollard
- Ollie Poole
- Robert Porcher
- Daryl Porter
- Ricky Porter
- Tracy Porter
- Charlie Potts
- Brandon Powell
- Matt Prater
- Paul Pratt
- John Prchlik
- Merv Pregulman
- Hal Prescott
- Glenn Presnell
- Bobby Price
- Cotton Price
- Derek Price
- Ernie Price
- Alan Pringle
- Mike Pringle
- Mike Pringley
- Kelvin Pritchett
- Alfred Pupunu
- Dave Pureifory
- Jim Pyne

== Q ==
- Jerry Quaerna
- Glover Quin
- Bill Quinlan

== R ==
- Warren Rabb
- Mike Rabold
- Bill Radovich
- Reggie Ragland
- Frank Ragnow
- Wali Rainer
- Dominic Raiola
- Ennis Rakestraw
- Manuel Ramirez
- Tony Ramirez
- Derrick Ramsey
- Al Randolph
- Clare Randolph
- Keith Ranspot
- Walter Rasby
- Am Rascher
- Rocky Rasley
- Wayne Rasmussen
- Tate Ratledge
- Corey Raymond
- Kalif Raymond
- Dave Rayner
- D. J. Reader
- Ray Reckmack
- Cory Redding
- Kasey Redfern
- Rudy Redmond
- Lucien Reeberg
- Travis Reece
- D. J. Reed
- Joe Reed
- Ken Reese
- Jalen Reeves-Maybin
- Frank Reich
- Jerry Reichow
- Caraun Reid
- Riley Reiff
- Freeman Rexer
- Bob Reynolds
- Craig Reynolds
- Garrett Reynolds
- Josh Reynolds
- Floyd Rhea
- Bruce Rhodes
- Dave Ribble
- Benny Ricardo
- Jim Ricca
- Giovanni Ricci
- Monty Rice
- Ron Rice
- Randy Rich
- Curvin Richards
- David Richards
- Perry Richards
- Ray Richards
- Barry Richardson
- Aldo Richins
- Mikhael Ricks
- Theo Riddick
- Dick Rifenburg
- Eugene Riley
- Lee Riley
- Christian Ringo
- Carroll Ringwalt
- Del Ritchhart
- Ron Rivers
- Joe Robb
- Chris Roberson
- Lake Roberson
- Andre Roberts
- Darryl Roberts
- Fred Roberts
- Michael Roberts
- Ray Roberts
- Amik Robertson
- Nickell Robey
- Allen Robinson
- A'Shawn Robinson
- Bo Robinson
- Corey Robinson
- Greg Robinson
- Johnnie Robinson
- Junior Robinson
- Ramzee Robinson
- Shelton Robinson
- Brian Robiskie
- Lyle Rockenbach
- Mark Rodenhauser
- Malcolm Rodriguez
- Dan Rogas
- Bill Rogers
- Charles Rogers
- Reggie Rogers
- Shaun Rogers
- Victor Rogers
- Juan Roque
- Aldrick Rosas
- Ken Roskie
- Jeremy Ross
- Tim Ross
- Ernie Rosteck
- Tobin Rote
- Fred Rothwell
- Ray Roundtree
- Stillman Rouse
- Mike Roussos
- Bob Rowe
- Mark Royals
- Rob Rubick
- Anthony Rubino
- Jake Rudock
- Jerry Rush
- Al Russas
- Ken Russell
- Matt Russell
- Dave Ryan
- Kent Ryan
- Sod Ryan
- Tom Rychlec
- Nick Ryder

== S ==
- Jimmy Saddler-McQueen
- Blaine Saipaia
- Ephraim Salaam
- Dan Saleaumua
- Harvey Salem
- Jim Salsbury
- Khari Samuel
- John Sanchez
- Barry Sanders
- Charlie Sanders
- Daryl Sanders
- Eric Sanders
- Ken Sanders
- Dan Sandifer
- Ryan Santoso
- Mohamed Sanu
- Mickey Sanzotta
- Charley Sarratt
- Paul Sarringhaus
- Larry Sartori
- Don Sasa
- Bill Saul
- Jacob Saylors
- Bo Scarbrough
- Elmer Schaake
- Tony Scheffler
- Alex Schibanoff
- John Schiechl
- Cory Schlesinger
- Vin Schleusner
- Joe Schmidt
- Joe Schmiesing
- John Schneller
- Michael Schofield
- Bob Scholtz
- Ivan Schottel
- Bill Schroeder
- Bill Schroll
- Kurt Schulz
- Elmer Schwartz
- Stuart Schweigert
- Clyde Scott
- Freddie Scott
- Jonathan Scott
- Kevin Scott
- Perry Scott
- Tracy Scroggins
- Austin Seibert
- Mohammed Seisay
- Clarence Self
- Harry Seltzer
- Tony Semple
- Harley Sewell
- Penei Sewell
- DeShawn Shead
- Ronald Shearer
- Chris Sheffield
- Deck Shelley
- Danny Shelton
- Bill Shepherd
- Jacoby Shepherd
- Kelvin Sheppard
- Roger Shoals
- Chuck Sieminski
- Dom Sigillo
- Ricardo Silva
- Dave Simmons
- Jack Simmons
- Jim Simon
- Dave Simonson
- Ko Simpson
- Billy Sims
- Ernie Sims
- Rob Sims
- Curt Singer
- Frankie Sinkwich
- George Sirochman
- Dan Skipper
- Tom Skladany
- Lou Slaby
- Darius Slay
- David Sloan
- Dwight Sloan
- John Small
- Alphonso Smith
- Bob Smith (born 1925)
- Bob Smith (born 1929)
- Bobby Smith
- Chris Smith
- Corey Smith
- DeAngelo Smith
- Dwight Smith
- Ed Smith
- Gene Smith
- Harry Smith
- J. D. Smith
- Jacquies Smith
- Keith Smith
- Kevin Smith
- Oscar Smith
- Otis Smith
- Paul Smith
- Ricky Smith
- Saivion Smith
- Terrelle Smith
- Wayne Smith
- Za'Darius Smith
- Bob Sneddon
- Ray Snell
- Joe Soboleski
- John Sokolosky
- Colby Sorsdal
- Cecil Souders
- Gene Spangler
- Harry Speelman
- Alonzo Spellman
- Akeem Spence
- Ollie Spencer
- George Speth
- Paul Spicer
- Chris Spielman
- Amari Spievey
- Marc Spindler
- Micheal Spurlock
- Amon-Ra St. Brown
- Brian Stablein
- Ed Stacco
- Red Stacy
- Matthew Stafford
- Jon Staggers
- Brenden Stai
- John Standeford
- Dick Stanfel
- Julian Stanford
- Walter Stanley
- Drew Stanton
- Stephen Starring
- Chuck Steele
- Jim Steen
- Jim Steffen
- Logan Stenberg
- Stud Stennett
- Hal Stephens
- Mark Stevenson
- James Stewart
- Jimmy Stewart
- Ryan Stewart
- Clint Stickdorn
- Bill Stits
- Eric Stocz
- Barry Stokes
- Dixie Stokes
- Dick Stovall
- Maurice Stovall
- Troy Stradford
- Thomas Strauthers
- Tai Streets
- Rich Strenger
- Loren Strickland
- Joe Stringfellow
- Kevin Strong
- Grant Stuard
- Roy Stuart
- Pat Studstill
- Steve Sucic
- Nate Sudfeld
- Leo Sugar
- Ndamukong Suh
- Ivory Sully
- Tony Sumler
- Pat Summerall
- Ty Summers
- Wilbur Summers
- Ian Sunter
- Kywin Supernaw
- Cameron Sutton
- Bill Swain
- Bill Swancutt
- Travis Swanson
- Karl Sweetan
- Bill Swiacki
- Larry Swider
- D'Andre Swift
- Pat Swilling
- Reggie Swinton
- Rudy Sylvan
- Paul Szakash
- Frank Szymanski

== T ==
- Teez Tabor
- Ken Talton
- Tyree Talton
- Darryl Tapp
- Damon Tassos
- Bob Tatarek
- Golden Tate
- Terry Tautolo
- Jahlani Tavai
- Altie Taylor
- Demetrius Taylor
- Devin Taylor
- Henry Taylor
- Terry Taylor
- Isaac TeSlaa
- Jim Teal
- Larry Tearry
- Garth TenNapel
- Derek Tennell
- Nat Terry
- Larry Tharpe
- Harry Thayer
- Bob Thomas
- Broderick Thomas
- Cal Thomas
- Corey Thomas
- Daniel Thomas
- Henry Thomas
- Isaiah Thomas
- Josh Thomas
- Logan Thomas
- Marcus Thomas
- Marvin Thomas
- Mike Thomas
- Russ Thomas
- Stantley Thomas-Oliver
- Jim Thomason
- Bobby Thompson (born 1939)
- Bobby Thompson (born 1947)
- Dave Thompson
- Jesse Thompson
- Jordan Thompson
- Leonard Thompson
- Marty Thompson
- Robert Thompson
- Vince Thompson
- Josh Thornhill
- Khyri Thornton
- Jim Thrower
- Owen Thuerk
- Ed Tillison
- Jim Todd
- Levine Toilolo
- Stuart Tolle
- Lou Tomasetti
- Laken Tomlinson
- Tony Tonelli
- Ted Topor
- LaVern Torgeson
- Tom Tracy
- Mack Travis
- Ross Travis
- John Treadaway
- Buzz Trebotich
- Stephen Trejo
- Bill Triplett
- Wallace Triplett
- John Tripson
- Frank Tripucka
- Desmond Trufant
- Eric Truvillion
- Sam Tsoutsouvas
- Rex Tucker
- Tom Tuinei
- Stephen Tulloch
- Darrell Tully
- Hal Turner
- Vernon Turner
- Zeke Turner
- Tom Turnure
- Maurice Tyler

== U ==
- Isaac Ukwu
- Emil Uremovich
- Mike Utley
- Iheanyi Uwaezuoke

== V ==
- Halapoulivaati Vaitai
- Sione Vaki
- Hakeem Valles
- Jeremiah Valoaga
- Kyle Vanden Bosch
- Doug Van Horn
- Sean Vanhorse
- Kyle Van Noy
- Art Van Tone
- Fred Vanzo
- Tommy Vardell
- Larry Vargo
- Nathan Vasher
- Pug Vaughan
- Cassius Vaughn
- Tom Vaughn
- Matt Veldman
- Ross Verba
- Walt Vezmar
- Kindle Vildor
- Scottie Vines
- Dee Virgin

== W ==
- LaAdrian Waddle
- Jonathan Wade
- John Waerig
- John Wager
- Rick Wagner
- Sid Wagner
- Danny Wagoner
- Kerwin Waldroup
- Bracy Walker
- Brian Walker
- Darnell Walker
- Doak Walker
- Marquis Walker
- Tracy Walker
- Tyrunn Walker
- Wayne Walker
- Willie Walker
- Rod Walters
- Troy Walters
- Chuck Walton
- Larry Walton
- Bill Ward
- Elmer Ward
- Paul Ward
- Andre Ware
- Larry Warford
- Jim Warne
- Lamont Warren
- Charles Washington
- Cornelius Washington
- Dave Washington
- Dwayne Washington
- Gene Washington
- Keith Washington
- Dale Waters
- Bobby Watkins
- Larry Watkins
- Tom Watkins
- Joe Watson
- Joe Watt
- Nate Wayne
- Jim Weatherall
- Buck Weaver
- Charlie Weaver
- Herman Weaver
- Ken Webb
- Dick Weber
- Mike Weger
- Howard Weiss
- Herb Welch
- Jim Welch
- Mike Wells
- Warren Wells
- John Wendling
- Bull Wesley
- Dante Wesley
- Charlie West
- Bryant Westbrook
- Cleve Wester
- Bob Westfall
- Chet Wetterlund
- Tyrus Wheat
- Mark Wheeler
- Byron White
- Daryl White
- Dewayne White
- Marvin White
- Sheldon White
- Stan White
- Wilbur White
- William White
- Mike Whited
- Tahir Whitehead
- Nick Whiteside
- Bob Whitlow
- Dave Whitsell
- John Wiatrak
- Cole Wick
- Tom Wickert
- Lloyd Wickett
- Doug Widell
- Bob Wiese
- John Wiethe
- Kenny Wiggins
- James Wilder
- Dan Wilkinson
- Allen Williams
- Antwione Williams
- Bobby Williams
- Brian Williams
- Corey Williams
- Derrick Williams
- Eric Williams (born 1960)
- Eric Williams (born 1962)
- Gardner Williams
- Isaiah Williams
- Jack Williams
- Jamaal Williams
- James Williams
- Jameson Williams
- Jarren Williams
- Jimmy Williams
- Jonah Williams
- Jonathan Williams
- Keiland Williams
- Mike Williams (born 1966)
- Mike Williams (born 1984)
- Nick Williams
- Ray Williams
- Rex Williams
- Roy Williams
- Sam Williams
- Scott Williams
- Sylvester Williams
- Tyleik Williams
- Tyrell Williams
- Walt Williams
- Luke Willson
- C. J. Wilson
- Camp Wilson
- Josh Wilson
- Mule Wilson
- Stanley Wilson
- Tavon Wilson
- Mekhi Wingo
- Randy Winkler
- George Winn
- Bob Winslow
- Brian Witherspoon
- John Witkowski
- Mark Witte
- Richie Woit
- Alex Wojciechowicz
- Bruce Womack
- John Woodcock
- Richard Woodley
- Jerry Woods
- Josh Woods
- Larry Woods
- LeVar Woods
- Robert Woods
- Damien Woody
- Butch Woolfolk
- Jahi Word-Daniels
- Daryl Worley
- Paul Worrilow
- Brock Wright
- Eric Wright
- Gabe Wright
- John Wright
- Tim Wright
- Doug Wyatt
- Sam Wyche
- Dexter Wynn
- Jonathan Wynn
- Jimmy Wyrick

== Y ==
- Rock Ya-Sin
- Jim Yarbrough
- Garo Yepremian
- Adrian Young
- Titus Young
- Willie Young
- Walt Yowarsky

== Z ==
- Roger Zatkoff
- Jerry Zawadzkas
- Kevin Zeitler
- Zach Zenner
- Anthony Zettel
- Roy Zimmerman
- Mickey Zofko
- Tony Zuzzio
- Brandon Zylstra
- Shane Zylstra
