= Detroit Lions all-time roster (A–Las) =

2,020 players have appeared in at least one regular season or postseason game in the National Football League (NFL) for the Detroit Lions franchise since 1928. This list includes those whose last names fall between "A" and "Las". For the rest, see Detroit Lions all-time roster (Lat–Z). This list is accurate through the end of the 2025 NFL season. The Lions franchise was founded in Portsmouth, Ohio, as the Portsmouth Spartans. In 1934, the franchise moved to Detroit and changed their name to the Lions, which was a play on the name of the Detroit Tigers.

== A ==
- Jared Abbrederis
- Ameer Abdullah
- Isa Abdul-Quddus
- Oday Aboushi
- Kevin Abrams
- Earnest Adams
- Jamal Adams
- Myles Adams
- Abe Addams
- Jamal Agnew
- Mitchell Agude
- Dave Ahrens
- Tony Aiello
- David Akers
- Ikaika Alama-Francis
- Grady Alderman
- Allen Aldridge
- Bruce Alexander
- Gerald Alexander
- Kwon Alexander
- Maurice Alexander
- Stephen Alexander
- Gene Alford
- Mike Alford
- Jimmy Allen
- Kyle Allen
- Nate Allen
- Kurt Allerman
- Geronimo Allison
- Tyson Alualu
- Walt Ambrose
- Danny Amendola
- Stan Andersen
- C. J. Anderson
- Courtney Anderson
- Gary Anderson (born 1955)
- Gary Anderson (born 1961)
- Scotty Anderson
- Eric Andolsek
- Charlie Ane Jr.
- Ezekiel Ansah
- Alex Anzalone
- Leo Araguz
- Tony Arena
- Thurston Armbrister
- Bob Armstrong
- Jim Arnold
- John Arnold
- Terrion Arnold
- George Atkins
- James Atkins
- John Atkins
- Jim Austin
- Rodney Austin
- Cliff Avril
- Kayode Awosika

== B ==
- Steve Baack
- Rod Babers
- Jeff Backus
- Johnson Bademosi
- Michael Badgley
- Boss Bailey
- Byron Bailey
- Robert Bailey
- Al Baker
- John Baker
- Karl Baldischwiler
- Jerry Ball
- Larry Ball
- Corey Ballentine
- Steve Banas
- Emil Banjavic
- Johnthan Banks
- Justin Bannan
- Vince Banonis
- Bradford Banta
- Don Barclay
- Lou Barle
- Adairius Barnes
- Al Barnes
- Darian Barnes
- Derrick Barnes
- Kevin Barnes
- Roosevelt Barnes
- Lem Barney
- Terry Barr
- Alex Barrett
- Reggie Barrett
- Scott Barrows
- Ron Bartell
- Greg Barton
- Idrees Bashir
- Mike Bass
- Charlie Batch
- Jake Bates
- Mario Bates
- Trevor Bates
- Stan Batinski
- Pat Batten
- Joe Bill Baumgardner
- Nick Bawden
- Abraham Beauplan
- Tavante Beckett
- Tony Beckham
- Bob Beemer
- Tom E. Beer
- Charlie Behan
- Steve Belichick
- Anthony Bell
- Bob Bell
- Joique Bell
- Marcus Bell
- Tatum Bell
- Nick Bellore
- Chuck Bennett
- Tommy Bennett
- Charles Benson
- Trinity Benson
- Bill Bentley
- Beau Benzschawel
- Chuck Bernard
- Karl Bernard
- Ed Berrang
- Aaron Berry
- Connie Mack Berry
- Rashod Berry
- Stanley Berryhill
- Jahvid Best
- Eric Beverly
- Jace Billingsley
- Darnell Bing
- Les Bingaman
- Mike Black
- Bennie Blades
- T.C. Blair
- Kerlin Blaise
- Carl Bland
- Paul Blessing
- David Blough
- LeGarrette Blount
- Greg Blue
- Luther Blue
- Matt Blundin
- Dré Bly
- Steve Boadway
- Chris Board
- Leigh Bodden
- Lynn Boden
- Maury Bodenger
- Shaun Bodiford
- Taylor Boggs
- Quinton Bohanna
- Anquan Boldin
- Russ Bolinger
- Andy Bolton
- Curtis Bolton
- Harry Bolton
- Shane Bonham
- Dick Booth
- Jocelyn Borgella
- John Bostic
- Ben Boswell
- Shawn Bouwens
- Jim Bowdoin
- Bill Bowman
- Cloyce Box
- Stephen Boyd
- Tom Boyd
- Tommie Boyd
- Tim Boyle
- Corey Bradford
- Danny Bradley
- Jon Bradley
- Luther Bradley
- Charlie Bradshaw
- Chuck Braidwood
- Brian Branch
- Brady Breeze
- Carl Brettschneider
- Teddy Bridgewater
- Paul Briggs
- Hal Brill
- Mike Brim
- Marlin Briscoe
- Maurice Britt
- Lou Brock, Jr.
- Tramaine Brock
- Willie Brock
- Michael Brockers
- Barrett Brooks
- Bud Brooks
- Jon Brooks
- Kevin Brooks
- Michael Brooks
- Steve Brooks
- Aaron Brown
- Arnold Brown
- C. C. Brown
- Charlie Brown
- Corwin Brown
- Evan Brown
- Howie Brown
- J. B. Brown
- Lomas Brown
- Mark Brown
- Marv Brown
- Ray Brown
- Reggie Brown
- Richard Brown
- Roger Brown
- Ryan Broyles
- Bob Brumley
- Copeland Bryan
- Anthony Bryant
- Armonty Bryant
- Austin Bryant
- Fernando Bryant
- Hunter Bryant
- Shawn Bryson
- Phillip Buchanon
- Eldra Buckley
- Isaiah Buggs
- Chet Bulger
- Daniel Bullocks
- Max Bumgardner
- Mike Bundra
- Dan Bunz
- John Burleson
- Nate Burleson
- Mike Burns
- Leonard Burton
- Michael Burton
- Rafael Bush
- Reggie Bush
- Sam Busich
- Dexter Bussey
- Paul Butcher
- Crezdon Butler
- Kelly Butler
- Josh Bynes

== C ==
- Jason Cabinda
- Ernie Caddel
- Jim Cain
- Patrick Cain
- Brian Calhoun
- Jim Callahan
- Ken Callicutt
- Bill Callihan
- Tony Calvelli
- Caleb Campbell
- Dan Campbell
- Jack Campbell
- Jeff Campbell
- Lamar Campbell
- Mike Campbell
- Stan Campbell
- Anthony Cannon
- Bill Cappleman
- Carl Capria
- Lloyd Cardwell
- Don Carey
- Bobby Carpenter
- Lew Carpenter
- Carl Carr
- Mark Carrier
- Darren Carrington
- Tra Carson
- Alex Carter
- Anthony Carter
- Marty Carter
- Pat Carter
- Stoney Case
- Chris Cash
- Aveion Cason
- Howard Cassady
- Matt Cassel
- Toby Caston
- Jim Caver
- John Cavosie
- Quintez Cephus
- William Cesare
- Jeff Chadwick
- Mike Chalenski
- Karl Chandler
- Tom Chantiles
- Shaun Chapas
- Clarence Chapman
- DJ Chark
- Orson Charles
- Stefan Charles
- Ben Chase
- Gosder Cherilus
- Raphel Cherry
- Frank Christensen
- George Christensen
- Koester Christensen
- Jack Christiansen
- Pete Chryplewicz
- Gus Cifelli
- Bob Cifers
- Vinny Ciurciu
- Chris Claiborne
- Al Clark
- Brian Clark
- Dexter Clark
- Dutch Clark
- Ernie Clark
- Jessie Clark
- Robert Clark
- Wayne Clark
- Willie Clay
- Emmett Cleary
- Ray Clemons
- Jackie Cline
- Ollie Cline
- Garry Cobb
- Avon Cobourne
- Bill Cody
- Shaun Cody
- Mike Cofer
- Gail Cogdill
- Joe Cohen
- Landon Cohen
- Keary Colbert
- Eddie Cole
- Tommy Colella
- Erik Coleman
- Justin Coleman
- Andre Collins
- Jamie Collins
- Jed Collins
- Harry Colon
- Trystan Colon-Castillo
- John Cominsky
- Dick Compton
- Mike Compton
- Jack Concannon
- Gerry Conlee
- Scott Conover
- Damion Cook
- Gene Cook
- Ted Cook
- Bill Cooke
- Hal Cooper
- Marcus Cooper
- Rafael Cooper
- Brandon Copeland
- Mike Corgan
- Jashon Cornell
- Craig Cotton
- Bill Cottrell
- Jerome Couplin III
- Clem Crabtree
- Paco Craig
- Lou Creekmur
- Ted Cremer
- James Cribbs
- Ray Crockett
- Don Croft
- Gene Cronin
- Tyrell Crosby
- Leon Crosswhite
- Germane Crowell
- Jermelle Cudjo
- Curley Culp
- Daunte Culpepper
- Jerome Cunningham
- Leon Cunningham
- Malik Cunningham
- Zach Cunningham
- August Curley
- Donté Curry
- Julius Curry

== D ==
- Dave D'Addio
- Joe Dahl
- Ken Dallafior
- Pete D'Alonzo
- Scott Daly
- Chase Daniel
- Darrell Daniels
- Mike Daniels
- Gary Danielson
- Byron Darby
- Chuck Darby
- Marcus Davenport
- Jim David
- Ben Davis
- Buster Davis
- Carlton Davis
- Eric Davis
- Frank Davis
- Glenn Davis
- James Davis
- Jarrad Davis
- Jerome Davis
- Kellen Davis
- Rashied Davis
- Ray Davis
- Red Davis
- Fred Dawley
- Keyunta Dawson
- Mike Dawson
- Tony Daykin
- Taylor Decker
- Bill DeCorrevont
- Bob DeFruiter
- Jeff Delaney
- Louis Delmas
- Mario DeMarco
- Rick DeMulling
- Guy Dennis
- Jerry DePoyster
- John Derby
- Robert Derleth
- Chuck DeShane
- Ty Detmer
- Jared DeVries
- Ebby DeWeese
- Dorne Dibble
- Dan Dickel
- Dorin Dickerson
- Dave Diehl
- Chris Dieterich
- Quandre Diggs
- Jerry Diorio
- Andre Dixon
- Jordon Dizon
- Kirk Dodge
- Steve Doig
- Don Doll
- Tony Dollinger
- Ryan Donahue
- Andrew Donnal
- Jim Doran
- Joe D'Orazio
- Keith Dorney
- Khalil Dorsey
- Forrest Douds
- Bob Dove
- D. J. Dozier
- Jeff Driskel
- Shane Dronett
- Reuben Droughns
- Dylan Drummond
- Eddie Drummond
- Tom Dublinski
- Mark Duckens
- T. J. Duckett
- Andy Dudish
- Bill Dudley
- Jack Dugger
- Howard Duncan
- Rick Duncan
- Lenny Dunlap
- Justin Durant
- Kris Durham
- Ross Dwelley

== E ==
- Blaine Earon
- Harry Ebding
- Dominik Eberle
- Eric Ebron
- Byron Eby
- Nick Eddy
- Kasim Edebali
- Dovonte Edwards
- Kalimba Edwards
- Patrick Edwards
- Stan Edwards
- Troy Edwards
- Kingsley Eguakun
- Parker Ehinger
- Joe Ehrmann
- Edmund Eiden
- Isaiah Ekejiuba
- Cleveland Elam
- Donnie Elder
- Homer Elias
- Gary Ellerson
- Bruce Ellington
- DeShon Elliott
- Jalen Elliott
- Devale Ellis
- Ken Ellis
- Larry Ellis
- Luther Elliss
- Earl Elser
- Bert Emanuel
- Bob Emerick
- Ox Emerson
- Greg Engel
- Doug English
- Fred Enke
- Russell Erxleben
- Doug Evans
- Leon Evans
- Murray Evans
- Dick Evey

== F ==
- Demarcus Faggins
- Terry Fair
- Nick Fairley
- Mike Fanning
- Ken Fantetti
- Andy Farkas
- George Farmer
- Mel Farr
- Mike Farr
- Miller Farr
- Joseph Fauria
- Creig Federico
- Bill Feldhaus
- Darren Fells
- Jerome Felton
- Joe Felton
- Bobby Felts
- Tom Fena
- Chuck Fenenbock
- Harold Fenner
- Lee Fenner
- Joe Ferguson
- Keith Ferguson
- Larry Ferguson
- Leon Fichman
- Anthony Fields
- Edgar Fields
- Bill Fifer
- Yamon Figurs
- Anthony Firkser
- Travis Fisher
- Bill Fisk
- Casey Fitzsimmons
- Dick Flanagan
- Ed Flanagan
- Bill Fleckenstein
- Jamar Fletcher
- Drayton Florence
- Keith Flowers
- Marquis Flowers
- Tre Flowers
- Trey Flowers
- Andre Fluellen
- Zack Follett
- Brendan Folmar
- Larry Foote
- Drew Forbes
- Brad Ford
- Darryl Ford
- John Ford
- Mike Ford
- Justin Forsett
- Aldo Forte
- Roman Fortin
- George Foster
- Larry Foster
- Amos Fowler
- Eric Fowler
- Jack Fox
- Jason Fox
- Vernon Fox
- Bill Fralic
- Eric Frampton
- Dennis Franklin
- Dennis Franks
- Miles Frazier
- Rob Fredrickson
- Dwight Freeney
- Nate Freese
- Rocky Freitas
- Barry French
- Gus Frerotte
- Mike Friede
- William Frizzell
- Bill Frohbose
- Ed Frutig
- Dom Fucci
- Travis Fulgham
- Corey Fuller
- Vincent Fuller
- Steve Furness
- Mike Furrey
- Tony Furst

== G ==
- Bob Gagliano
- Roy Gagnon
- Lawrence Gaines
- Michael Gaines
- Dave Gallagher
- Frank Gallagher
- Duane Galloway
- Connor Galvin
- Chris Gambol
- Billy Gambrell
- Sonny Gandee
- Dylan Gandy
- Jeff Garcia
- Gilbert Gardner
- C. J. Gardner-Johnson
- Olandis Gary
- Frank Gatski
- Dennis Gaubatz
- William Gay
- Gene Gedman
- Chris Geile
- Ray George
- Willie Germany
- Jim Gibbons
- Jahmyr Gibbs
- Sonny Gibbs
- Aaron Gibson
- Dennis Gibson
- Wallace Gilberry
- Mark Gilbert
- Jimmie Giles
- Sloko Gill
- Jim Gillette
- Harry Gilmer
- Steven Gilmore Jr.
- Tommie Ginn
- Paul Gipson
- Jug Girard
- Graham Glasgow
- Bill Glass
- Willis Glassgow
- Kevin Glover
- Jared Goff
- Dan Goich
- Sam Goldman
- Kenny Golladay
- Jerry Golsteyn
- Dejon Gomes
- John Gonzaga
- Jeff Gooch
- Zaviar Gooden
- André Goodman
- Hank Goodman
- Ron Goovert
- John Gordon
- Lamar Gordon
- John Gordy
- Gordon Gore
- Danny Gorrer
- Al Graham
- Ben Graham
- Les Graham
- William Graham
- Aaron Grant
- Dan Gray
- Hector Gray
- Mel Gray
- Don Greco
- Antoine Green
- Barrett Green
- Curtis Green
- Donnie Green
- Jacquez Green
- Jonte Green
- Tion Green
- Willie Green
- John Greene
- Chris Greenwood
- Al Greer
- Donovan Greer
- Terry Greer
- Ted Grefe
- Everson Griffen
- Hal Griffen
- Garrett Griffin
- James Griffin
- Frank Grigonis
- Nicholas Grigsby
- George Grimes
- Dan Gronkowski
- Mel Groomes
- Matt Grootegoed
- Rex Grossman
- Bob Grottkau
- Darrell Grymes
- Brock Gutierrez
- Ace Gutowsky

== H ==
- Johnny Hackenbruck
- Elmer Hackney
- Gary Hadd
- Barney Hafen
- Mike Haggerty
- Az-Zahir Hakim
- Alvin Hall
- James Hall
- Johnny Hall
- Marvin Hall
- Ron Hall
- Tom Hall
- Erick Hallett
- Ty Hallock
- Ray Hamilton
- Remy Hamilton
- Gene Hamlin
- Da'Shawn Hand
- Larry Hand
- Ben Hanks
- Chuck Hanneman
- Frank Hanny
- Dale Hansen
- Jason Hanson
- Clay Harbor
- Pat Harder
- Roger Harding
- Jim Hardy
- Duron Harmon
- Eli Harold
- Dwayne Harper
- Thomas Harper
- James Harrell
- Joey Harrington
- Arlen Harris
- Charles Harris
- Chris Harris
- Corey Harris
- Dud Harris
- Leroy Harris
- Nick Harris
- Will Harris
- Chris Harrison
- Damon Harrison
- Gran Harrison
- Jerome Harrison
- Leon Hart
- Jeff Hartings
- Maurice Harvey
- George Hastings
- Hogan Hatten
- Dave Haverdick
- Spencer Havner
- D. J. Hayden
- Jovan Haye
- Tracy Hayworth
- Bruce Hector
- George Hekkers
- Will Heller
- Jack Helms
- Hessley Hempstead
- John Henderson
- Alex Henery
- Mike Hennigan
- Anthony Henry
- Drew Henson
- Anthony Herron
- Frank Herron
- Craig Hertwig
- Parker Hesse
- Ralph Heywood
- Donnie Hickman
- Kevin Hickman
- Ivan Hicks
- LaMarcus Hicks
- Mark Hicks
- R.W. Hicks
- Ben Hightower
- Wally Hilgenberg
- Rusty Hilger
- David Hill
- Greg Hill
- Harlon Hill
- J. D. Hill
- Jim Hill
- Jimmy Hill
- Rod Hill
- Sammie Lee Hill
- Shaun Hill
- Tye Hill
- Corey Hilliard
- Bill Hillman
- Wes Hills
- John Hilton
- Curly Hinchman
- Mike Hinnant
- Eric Hipple
- Steve Hirsch
- Kevin Hobbs
- T. J. Hockenson
- Nathan Hodel
- KhaDarel Hodge
- Robert Hoernschemeyer
- Doug Hogland
- Doug Hogue
- Will Holden
- Darius Holland
- Vernon Holland
- John Hollar
- Tony Holm
- Rodney Holman
- Earl Holmes
- Jerry Holmes
- Terrence Holt
- Todd Hons
- Hendon Hooker
- Jim Hooks
- Mitch Hoopes
- Melvin Hoover
- Harry Hopp
- Tyrone Hopson
- Zach Horton
- Chris Houston
- James Houston
- Billy Howard
- Desmond Howard
- Chris Hubbard
- Marv Hubbard
- Vern Huffman
- Albert Huggins
- Chuck Hughes
- Juju Hughes
- Mike Hughes
- Jim Hunnicutt
- Phillip Hunt
- Herman Hunter
- James Hunter
- Jason Hunter
- Jeff Hunter
- Ramey Hunter
- Scott Hunter
- Richard Huntley
- Thomas Hupke
- Aidan Hutchinson
- Elvin Hutchison
- Kerry Hyder

== I ==
- Mohamed Ibrahim
- Israel Idonije
- Godwin Igwebuike
- James Ihedigbo
- Gabe Ikard
- Bruce Irvin
- LeRoy Irvin
- Sedrick Irvin
- Ralph Isselhardt
- Bob Ivory
- Chidi Iwuoma
- George Izo

== J ==
- Asa Jackson
- Cedric Jackson
- Ernie Jackson
- Grady Jackson
- Jonah Jackson
- Justin Jackson
- Lawrence Jackson
- Mike Jackson
- Tyoka Jackson
- Jerry Jacobs
- Garry James
- Jesse James
- John James
- June James
- Tommy James
- George Jamison
- Jon Jansen
- Ray Jarvis
- Floyd Jaszewski
- Dick Jauron
- Ricky Jean-Francois
- Billy Jefferson
- Jermar Jefferson
- Quinton Jefferson
- Shawn Jefferson
- Greg Jeffries
- Ken Jenkins
- Leon Jenkins
- Melvin Jenkins
- Walt Jenkins
- Adam Jennings
- Lou Jennings
- Ron Jessie
- John Jett (born 1918)
- John Jett (born 1968)
- Andre Johnson
- Bryant Johnson
- Calvin Johnson
- Demetrious Johnson
- George Johnson
- Gilvanni Johnson
- Isaiah Johnson
- Jack Johnson
- James Johnson
- Jimmie Johnson
- John Henry Johnson
- Kerryon Johnson
- Kevin Johnson
- Landon Johnson
- Levi Johnson
- Mike Johnson
- Pepper Johnson
- Richard Johnson
- Rick Johnson
- Rudi Johnson
- Spider Johnson
- Troy Johnson (born 1962)
- Troy Johnson (born 1964)
- Ty Johnson
- Tyrell Johnson
- Gordon Jolley
- A.J. Jones
- Andre Jones
- Andy Jones
- Benito Jones
- Chris Jones
- Christian Jones
- David Jones
- Doug Jones
- Elmer Jones
- Jamarco Jones
- James Jones (born 1961)
- James Jones (born 1969)
- Jason Jones
- Jeff Jones
- Jim Jones
- Jimmie Jones
- Kevin Jones
- Marvin Jones
- Ralph Jones
- T. J. Jones
- Victor Jones
- Richard Jordan
- Brandon Joseph
- Kerby Joseph
- Red Joseph
- Matt Joyce
- Steve Junker
- Walt Jurkiewicz

== K ==
- Vyto Kab
- Jeff Kacmarek
- Cy Kahl
- Lew Kamanu
- Rick Kane
- Al Kaporch
- Carl Karilivacz
- Rich Karlis
- Keith Karpinski
- Alex Karras
- Ted Karras
- George Karstens
- Tony Kaska
- Kevin Kasper
- Jim Kearney
- Jayron Kearse
- Bob Keene
- Brian Kelly
- Devon Kennard
- Bill Kennedy
- Kenoy Kennedy
- Tom Kennedy (born 1920)
- Tom Kennedy (born 1996)
- Steve Kenney
- Greg Kent
- Dick Kercher
- Zac Kerin
- Chris Kern
- Alex Ketzko
- John Kidd
- Miles Killebrew
- Angelo King
- Eric King
- Horace King
- Matt Kinzer
- David Kircus
- Travis Kirschke
- Paul Kiser
- Ishmaa'ily Kitchen
- Jon Kitna
- Lee Kizzire
- Ed Klewicki
- Pete Kmetovic
- Zonovan Knight
- Larry Knorr
- Sam Knox
- Karl Koepfer
- Jeff Komlo
- David Kopay
- Joe Kopcha
- Kyle Kosier
- Michael Kostiuk
- Bob Kowalkowski
- Scott Kowalkowski
- Nick Kowgios
- Tommy Kraemer
- Jerry Krall
- Erik Kramer
- Ron Kramer
- Dave Krieg
- Clint Kriewaldt
- Frank Kring
- Joe Krol
- Ray Krouse
- Bert Kuczynski

== La-Las ==
- Jacob Lacey
- Chris Lacy
- Tyler Lacy
- Antwan Lake
- Roger LaLonde
- Greg Landry
- Austen Lane
- Night Train Lane
- T. J. Lang
- Sam LaPorta
- Dan LaRose
- Bill Larson
- Yale Lary
- Jim Laslavic
- Don Laster
