= 1946 Detroit Lions season =

NFL team season

- Head coach: Gus Dorais

Results
- Record: 1–10
- Division place: 5th NFL Western
- Playoffs: Did not qualify

The 1946 Detroit Lions season was their 17th in the league. The team failed to improve on their previous season's output of 7–3, winning only one game. They failed to qualify for the playoffs for the 11th consecutive season. The Lions lost their first 6 games before beating the Steelers at 17–7 at home. The Lions then lost their final 4 games of the season.

== Schedule ==
Week	Date	Opponent	Result	Record	Venue	Recap
1	Bye					
2	September 30	at **Chicago Cardinals**	**L** 14–34	0–1	Comiskey Park	Recap
3	October 6	at Washington Redskins	**L** 16–17	0–2	Griffith Stadium	Recap
4	October 13	**Chicago Cardinals**	**L** 14–36	0–3	Briggs Stadium	Recap
5	October 20	at **Los Angeles Rams**	**L** 14–35	0–4	Los Angeles Memorial Coliseum	Recap
6	October 27	at **Green Bay Packers**	**L** 7–10	0–5	Wisconsin State Fair Park	Recap
7	November 3	**Los Angeles Rams**	**L** 20–41	0–6	Briggs Stadium	Recap
8	November 10	Pittsburgh Steelers	**W** 17–7	1–6	Briggs Stadium	Recap
9	November 17	**Green Bay Packers**	**L** 0–9	1–7	Briggs Stadium	Recap
10	November 24	at **Chicago Bears**	**L** 6–42	1–8	Wrigley Field	Recap
11	November 28	Boston Yanks	**L** 10–34	1–9	Briggs Stadium	Recap
12	December 8	**Chicago Bears**	**L** 24–45	1–10	Briggs Stadium	Recap

Note: Intra-division opponents are in bold text.

== Standings ==
NFL Western Division
	W	L	T	PCT	DIV	PF	PA	STK
Chicago Bears	8	2	1	.800	6–1–1	289	193	W1
Los Angeles Rams	6	4	1	.600	5–2–1	277	257	W2
Chicago Cardinals	6	5	0	.545	5–3	260	198	W2
Green Bay Packers	6	5	0	.545	3–5	148	158	L1
Detroit Lions	1	10	0	.091	0–8	142	310	L4

Note: Tie games were not officially counted in the standings until 1972.

== Roster ==
1946 Detroit Lions roster
Backs: 88 Jim Callahan CB/RB; 84 Bob Cifers FB/S; 76 Bill DeCorrevont RB/CB; 17 Chuck DeShane S/FB/K; 34 Elmer Hackney FB/LB; 40 Elmer Madarik CB/RB; 85 Joel McCoy RB; 44 Dave Ryan LB/RB; 18 Mickey Sanzotta RB; 55 Ivan Schottel FB; 30 Gene Spangler CB/RB; 86 Bob Westfall FB/LB; 66 Camp Wilson FB	Linemen/Linebackers: 65 Stan Batinski G/DG; 46 Leon Fichman DT/T; 80 Walt Jurkiewicz C/LB; 73 Jim Montgomery T/DT; 66 Anthony Rubino G; 83 Frank Szymanski LB/C; 6 Damon Tassos DG/G/K; 71 Russ Thomas T/DT; 81 Emil Uremovich DT/T; 33 Walt Vezmar DG; 20 Lloyd Wickett T/DT	Ends/Receivers: 21 Ted Cremer; 11 Ed Frutig; 10 John Greene; 52 Jack Helms K; 31 Ralph Jones; 82 Jack Matheson; rookies in italics
