= 1944 Detroit Lions season =

NFL team season

- Owner: Fred L. Mandel Jr.
- General manager: Lewis M. Cromwell
- Head coach: Gus Dorais
- Home stadium: Briggs Stadium

Results
- Record: 6–3–1
- Division place: T-2nd NFL Western
- Playoffs: Did not qualify

The 1944 Detroit Lions season was their 15th in the league. The team improved on their previous season's output of 3–6–1, winning six games. They failed to qualify for the playoffs for the ninth consecutive season.

== Schedule ==
Week	Date	Opponent	Result	Record	Venue	Recap
1	Bye					
2	Bye					
3	October 1	at **Green Bay Packers**	**L** 6–27	0–1	Wisconsin State Fair Park	Recap
4	October 8	Brooklyn Tigers	**W** 19–14	1–1	Briggs Stadium	Recap
5	October 15	**Cleveland Rams**	**L** 17–20	1–2	Briggs Stadium	Recap
6	October 22	at **Chicago Bears**	**T** 21–21	1–2–1	Wrigley Field	Recap
7	October 29	**Green Bay Packers**	**L** 0–14	1–3–1	Briggs Stadium	Recap
8	November 5	at **Card-Pitt**	**W** 27–6	2–3–1	Forbes Field	Recap
9	November 12	**Card-Pitt**	**W** 21–7	3–3–1	Briggs Stadium	Recap
10	November 19	**Chicago Bears**	**W** 41–21	4–3–1	Briggs Stadium	Recap
11	November 26	at **Cleveland Rams**	**W** 26–14	5–3–1	League Park	Recap
12	December 3	Boston Yanks	**W** 38–7	6–3–1	Briggs Stadium	Recap

Note: Intra-division opponents are in bold text.

== Standings ==
NFL Western Division
	W	L	T	PCT	DIV	PF	PA	STK
Green Bay Packers	8	2	0	.800	7–1	238	141	W1
Chicago Bears	6	3	1	.667	4–3–1	258	172	W2
Detroit Lions	6	3	1	.667	4–3–1	216	151	W4
Cleveland Rams	4	6	0	.400	4–4	188	224	L2
Card-Pitt	0	10	0	.000	0–8	108	328	L10

Note: Tie games were not officially counted in the standings until 1972.

== Roster ==
1944 Detroit Lions final roster
**Backs**: 25 Bill Callihan RB/S; 23 Fred Dawley FB/LB; 34 Elmer Hackney FB/LB; 45 Bob Keene RB/CB; 42 Jackie Lowther RB/CB/P; 21 Frank Sinkwich RB/CB/K/P; 64 Buzz Trebotich RB/S; 11 Art Van Tone RB/CB; 86 Bob Westfall FB/LB	**Linemen/Linebackers**: 65 Stan Batinski T/G/DT/DG; 73 Joe D'Orazio T/DT; 10 John Greene G/DG; 75 Al Kaporch G/DG; 20 Sonny Liles G/DG; 77 Luke Lindon T/DT; 71 Ed Opalewski T/DT; 78 Ernie Rosteck C/LB; 52 George Sirochman G/DG; 50 Alex Wojciechowicz C/LB	**Ends/Receivers**: 83 Paul Blessing; 61 Wayne Clark; 84 Dave Diehl; 81 Dale Hansen; 82 Jack Matheson; 66 Freeman Rexer; **Reserve**: Stillman Rouse E (Military); rookies in italics
