= 1945 Detroit Lions season =

NFL team season

- Head coach: Gus Dorais
- Home stadium: Briggs Stadium

Results
- Record: 7–3
- Division place: 2nd NFL Western
- Playoffs: Did not qualify

The 1945 Detroit Lions season was their 16th in the league. The Lions improved on their previous season's output of 6–3–1, winning seven games. They failed to qualify for the playoffs for the 10th consecutive season. Fullback Bob Westfall led the team in rushing and scoring and was selected by the Associated Press to the 1945 All-Pro team.

== Schedule ==
| Week | Date | Opponent | Result | Record | Venue | Recap |
|---|---|---|---|---|---|---|
| 1 | September 23 | at **Chicago Cardinals** | **W** 10–0 | 1–0 | Wisconsin State Fair Park | Recap |
| 2 | September 30 | at **Washington Redskins** | **Exhibition** | 1–0 | Baltimore Municipal Stadium | Recap |
| 3 | October 7 | at **Green Bay Packers** | **L** 21–57 | 1–1 | Wisconsin State Fair Park | Recap |
| 4 | October 14 | Philadelphia Eagles | **W** 28–24 | 2–1 | Briggs Stadium | Recap |
| 5 | October 21 | **Chicago Cardinals** | **W** 26–0 | 3–1 | Briggs Stadium | Recap |
| 6 | October 28 | **Chicago Bears** | **W** 16–10 | 4–1 | Briggs Stadium | Recap |
| 7 | November 4 | at Boston Yanks | **W** 10–9 | 5–1 | Fenway Park | Recap |
| 8 | November 11 | at **Chicago Bears** | **W** 35–28 | 6–1 | Wrigley Field | Recap |
| 9 | November 18 | at New York Giants | **L** 14–35 | 6–2 | Polo Grounds | Recap |
| 10 | November 22 | **Cleveland Rams** | **L** 21–28 | 6–3 | Briggs Stadium | Recap |
| 11 | December 2 | **Green Bay Packers** | **W** 14–3 | 7–3 | Briggs Stadium | Recap |

Note: Intra-division opponents are in bold text.

== Standings ==
NFL Western Division
| | W | L | T | PCT | DIV | PF | PA | STK |
|---|---|---|---|---|---|---|---|---|
| Cleveland Rams | 9 | 1 | 0 | .900 | 7–0 | 244 | 136 | W5 |
| Detroit Lions | 7 | 3 | 0 | .700 | 5–2 | 195 | 194 | W1 |
| Green Bay Packers | 6 | 4 | 0 | .600 | 3–4 | 258 | 173 | L1 |
| Chicago Bears | 3 | 7 | 0 | .300 | 2–6 | 192 | 235 | W2 |
| Chicago Cardinals | 1 | 9 | 0 | .100 | 1–6 | 98 | 228 | L6 |

Note: Tie games were not officially counted in the standings until 1972.

== Roster ==
1944 Detroit Lions final roster
| Backs: 49 Dick Booth RB/CB; 32 Bob Brumley RB/CB; 25 Bill Callihan RB/S/K; 17 Chuck DeShane RB/CB; 42 Andy Farkas RB/CB; 34 Elmer Hackney FB/LB; 48 Chuck Fenenbock RB/CB/P; 78 Frank Kring FB/LB; 29 Elmer Madarik RB/CB; 44 Dave Ryan RB/CB/P; 64 Buzz Trebotich RB/S; 20 Dick Weber RB/CB; 86 Bob Westfall FB/LB | Linemen/Linebackers: 65 Stan Batinski G/T/DG/DT; 75 Al Kaporch G/DG; 71 Mike Kostiuk T/DT; 46 Joe Manzo T/DT; 77 Garvin Mugg T/DT; 22 Bob Nelson C/LB; 73 Bill Radovich G/DG; 45 Larry Sartori G/DG; 52 Dom Sigillo T/G/DT/DG; 83 Frank Szymanski C/LB; 6 Damon Tassos G/DG; 81 Emil Uremovich T/DT; 50 Alex Wojciechowicz C/LB | Ends/Receivers: 11 Ed Frutig; 10 John Greene; 81 Archie Milano; 82 Jack Matheson; 12 Vince Mazza; Reserve: Stillman Rouse E (Military); rookies in italics |
