= 1943 Detroit Lions season =

NFL team season

- Owner: Fred L. Mandel Jr.
- General manager: Graham P. Smith
- Head coach: Gus Dorais
- Home stadium: Briggs Stadium

Results
- Record: 3–6–1
- Division place: 3rd NFL Western
- Playoffs: Did not qualify

The 1943 Detroit Lions season was the franchise's 14th season in the National Football League. The team finished at 3–6–1, an improvement on their previous season's output of 0–11. They failed to qualify for the playoffs for the eighth consecutive season. Their 0–0 tie with the New York Giants in week 8 is the last scoreless tie in the NFL.

== Offseason ==
=== NFL Draft ===
1943 Detroit Lions draft
Round	Pick	Player	Position	College	Notes
1	1	Frankie Sinkwich	B	Georgia	
2	11	Dave Schreiner	E	Wisconsin	
3	15	Dick Ashcom	T	Oregon	
4	26	Ralph Hamer	B	Furman	
5	31	Lloyd Wickett	T	Oregon State	
6	41	Jim Jones	BB	Union (TN)	
7	51	Paul Sizemore	E	Furman	
8	61	George Poschner	E	Georgia	
9	71	Jack Irish	T	Arizona	
10	81	Jack Fenton	B	Michigan State	
11	91	Dick Renfro	FB	Washington State	
12	101	Bob Kolesar	G	Michigan	
13	111	Del Huntinger	B	Portland	
14	121	Ellard Dernoncort	E	Colorado	
15	131	Dick Woodward	E	William & Mary	
16	141	Marv Bass	T	St. Louis	
17	151	Vic Peelish	G	West Virginia	
18	161	Chet Maeda	HB	Colorado State	
19	171	Bert Kuczynski	E	Penn	
20	181	Al Scanland	B	Oklahoma State	
21	191	Royal "Ace" Lohry	B	Iowa State	
22	201	Percy Holland	G	LSU	
23	211	Mike Fitzgerald	G	Missouri	
24	221	Bill Remington	C	Washington State	
25	231	Huel Hamm	B	Oklahoma	
26	241	Irv Konopka	T	Idaho	
27	251	Chuck Fears	T	UCLA	
28	261	Bert Ekern	E	Missouri	
29	271	Virgil Wagner	B	Millikin	
30	281	Manny Kaplan	B	Western Maryland=	
Made roster † Pro Football Hall of Fame

== Regular season ==
=== Schedule ===
Game	Date	Opponent	Result	Record	Venue	Attendance	Recap	Sources
1	September 19	**Chicago Cardinals**	**W** 35–17	1–0	Briggs Stadium	23,408	Recap	
2	September 26	Brooklyn Dodgers	**W** 27–0	2–0	Briggs Stadium	23,768	Recap	
3	October 3	**Chicago Bears**	**L** 21–27	2–1	Briggs Stadium	48,118	Recap	
4	October 10	at **Green Bay Packers**	**L** 14–35	2–2	City Stadium	21,396	Recap	
5	October 17	at **Chicago Cardinals**	**W** 7–0	3–2	Civic Stadium	15,072	Recap	
6	October 24	**Green Bay Packers**	**L** 6–27	3–3	Briggs Stadium	41,463	Recap	
7	October 31	at **Chicago Bears**	**L** 14–35	3–4	Wrigley Field	25,187	Recap	
8	November 7	New York Giants	**T** 0–0	3–4–1	Briggs Stadium	16,992	Recap	
9	November 14	at Washington Redskins	**L** 20–42	3–5–1	Griffith Stadium	35,540	Recap	
10	November 21	at Phil-Pitt Steagles	**L** 34–35	3–6–1	Forbes Field	23,338	Recap	
Note: Intra-division opponents are in **bold** text.

== Standings ==
NFL Western Division
	W	L	T	PCT	DIV	PF	PA	STK
Chicago Bears	8	1	1	.889	5–0–1	303	157	W1
Green Bay Packers	7	2	1	.778	4–1–1	264	172	W3
Detroit Lions	3	6	1	.333	2–4	178	218	L2
Chicago Cardinals	0	10	0	.000	0–6	95	238	L10

Note: Tie games were not officially counted in the standings until 1972.

== Roster ==
1943 Detroit Lions final roster
Backs: 25 Bill Callihan RB/S; 46 Tommy Colella RB/CB/P; 17 Mike Corgan FB/LB; 23 Murray Evans RB/S; 48 Chuck Fenenbock RB/CB; 34 Elmer Hackney RB/CB; 44 Harry Hopp RB/CB/P; 45 Bob Keene RB/S; 12 Ned Mathews RB/CB; 21 Frank Sinkwich RB/CB/P; 11 Art Van Tone RB/CB	Linemen/Linebackers: 65 Stan Batinski G/DG; 52 Gerry Conlee C/LB; 64 Alex Ketzko T/DT; 73 Augie Lio G/T/DG/DT/K; 76 Al Kaporch T/DT; 62 Sonny Liles G/DG; 83 Riley Matheson G/DG; 71 Ted Pavelec T/DT; 68 Lyle Rockenbach G/DG; 66 Anthony Rubino G/DG; 40 Roy Stuart G/DG; 50 Alex Wojciechowicz C/LB	Ends/Receivers: 80 Bill Fisk; 86 Ben Hightower; 20 Bert Kuczynski; 81 Bob Layden; 82 Jack Matheson; Reserve: 10 Lloyd Cardwell RB/CB (inactive); Dave Diehl E (inactive); Tony Furst T/DT (Military); Stillman Rouse E (Military); rookies in italics

== Video ==
- YouTube – Detroit Lions at Washington Redskins – (color, no audio) – November 14, 1943
