= 1967 Detroit Lions season =

NFL team season

- Head coach: Joe Schmidt
- Home stadium: Tiger Stadium

Results
- Record: 5–7–2
- Division place: 3rd NFL Central
- Playoffs: Did not qualify

The 1967 Detroit Lions season was the 38th season in franchise history. On August 5, the Lions met the Denver Broncos in the first inter-league exhibition game. The Broncos beat the Lions 13–7 to become the first AFL team to beat an NFL team.

The Lions boasted both the NFL's Offensive and Defensive rookies of the year: running back Mel Farr and cornerback Lem Barney.

== Offseason ==
=== NFL draft ===
1967 Detroit Lions draft
Round	Pick	Player	Position	College	Notes
1	7	Mel Farr *	Running back	UCLA	
2	34	Lem Barney * ^{†}	Cornerback	Jackson State	
3	60	Paul Naumoff *	Linebacker	Tennessee	
4	88	Lew Kamanu	Defensive end	Weber State	
6	141	Tim Jones	Quarterback	Weber State	
6	144	John McCambridge	Defensive end	Northwestern	
7	166	Ted Tuinstra	Tackle	Iowa State	
9	218	Mike Weger	Safety	Bowling Green	
10	245	Jerry Hayhoe	Guard	USC	
11	270	Ray Shirley	Tackle	Arizona State	
12	297	Eric Watts	Defensive back	San Jose State	
13	322	Lamar Wright	Guard	Georgia Tech	
14	349	Cleveland Robinson	Defensive end	South Carolina State	
15	374	Sam Burke	Defensive back	Georgia Tech	
16	401	Jerry Zawadzkas	Tight end	Columbia	
17	426	Ken Ramsey	Defensive tackle	Northwestern	
Made roster † Pro Football Hall of Fame * Made at least one Pro Bowl during career

== Personnel ==
=== Staff / Coaches ===
1967 Detroit Lions staff
Front office: Owner - William Clay Ford, Sr.; Vice President / General manager - Russ Thomas; Executive Vice President - Edwin J. Anderson; Director of Player Personnel - Carl Brettschneider; Treasurer - Newton S. Peters; Publicity Director / Business Manager - Lyall Smith; Assistant Publicity Director - Elliott Trumbull; Equipment manager - Roy Marklem; Assistant equipment manager - Charles "Rip" Collins; Head coaches: Head coach – Joe Schmidt; Offensive coaches: Offensive Coordinator / Backs - Bill McPeak; Offensive Line - Chuck Knox; Wide Receivers - Johnny North	Defensive coaches: Defensive Coordinator / Secondary - Jim David; Defensive Line / Linebackers - Jim Martin; Strength and conditioning: Trainer - Kent Falb; Assistant Trainer - Dave Smith

=== Final roster ===
1967 Detroit Lions roster
Quarterbacks: 16 Milt Plum; 14 Karl Sweetan; Running backs: 24 Mel Farr; 45 Bobby Felts; 31 Amos Marsh; 35 Tom Nowatzke; 23 Tom Watkins; Wide receivers: 89 Gail Cogdill; 87 John Henderson; 81 Bill Malinchak; Tight ends: 80 Jim Gibbons; 85 Jerry Zawadzkas	Offensive linemen: 79 Charlie Bradshaw T; 52 Bill Cottrell T; 54 Ed Flanagan C; 68 Frank Gallagher G; 75 John Gordy G; 66 Bob Kowalkowski G; 63 Chuck Walton G; 77 Randy Winkler T; Defensive linemen: 74 Larry Hand DE; 71 Alex Karras DT; 86 John McCambridge DE; 78 Darris McCord DE; 83 Mike Melinkovich DE; 82 Jerry Rush DT	Linebackers: 57 Ron Goovert MLB; 59 Ernie Clark OLB; 53 Mike Lucci MLB; 50 Paul Naumoff OLB; 55 Wayne Walker OLB/K; Defensive backs: 20 Lem Barney CB/P; 26 Mike Bass CB; 44 Dick LeBeau CB; 21 Bruce Maher SS; 47 Wayne Rasmussen FS; 27 Bobby Thompson CB; 48 Tom Vaughn FS; 28 Mike Weger SS; Special teams: 1 Garo Yepremian K	Reserve lists: 40 Nick Eddy RB (IR); 67 Wally Hilgenberg LB (IR); 85 Lew Kamanu DE (IR); 88 Ron Kramer TE (IR); 70 Denis Moore T (IR); 49 Johnnie Robinson CB/S (IR); 73 Roger Shoals T (IR); 25 Pat Studstill (IR) WR/P; Taxi squad: -- Mike Alford C; 76 Rocky Freitas T; 10 Tim Jones QB; -- Eric Watts RB; _{40 active, 8 reserve, 4 taxi / practice squad} Note: rookies in italics

== Regular season ==
=== Schedule ===
Week	Date	Opponent	Result	Record	Attendance
1	September 17	at Green Bay Packers	T 17–17	0–0–1	50,861
2	September 24	Cleveland Browns	W 31–14	1–0–1	57,383
3	October 1	at St. Louis Cardinals	L 28–38	1–1–1	43,821
4	October 8	Green Bay Packers	L 17–27	1–2–1	57,877
5	October 15	at Chicago Bears	L 3–14	1–3–1	46,024
6	October 22	Atlanta Falcons	W 24–3	2–3–1	50,601
7	October 29	at San Francisco 49ers	W 45–3	3–3–1	37,990
8	November 5	Chicago Bears	L 13–27	3–4–1	55,606
9	November 12	at Minnesota Vikings	T 10–10	3–4–2	40,032
10	November 19	at Baltimore Colts	L 7–41	3–5–2	60,238
11	November 23	Los Angeles Rams	L 7–31	3–6–2	54,389
12	December 3	Pittsburgh Steelers	L 14–24	3–7–2	47,713
13	December 10	at New York Giants	W 30–7	4–7–2	63,011
14	December 17	Minnesota Vikings	W 14–3	5–7–2	44,874

=== Game summaries ===
==== Week 1 ====
Detroit Lions (0–0) at Green Bay Packers (0–0)

Quarter	1	2	3	4	Total
Lions	10	7	0	0	17
Packers	0	0	7	10	17

at Lambeau Field • Green Bay, Wisconsin

- Date: September 17
- Game weather: 69 °F (21 °C) • Wind 6 mph
- Game attendance: 50,861
- TV: CBS
- Pro-Football-Reference.com

Game information

Lions

- Milt Plum
  7/17, 41 Yds
- Mel Farr
  16 Rush, 95 Yds
- Pat Studstill
  3 Rec, 19 Yds

Packers

- Bart Starr
  14/23, 321 Yds, 4 INT
- Jim Grabowski
  10 Rush, 36 Yds
- Carroll Dale
  4 Rec, 109 Yds

Scoring summary

Quarter	Time	Drive			Team	Scoring information	Score	
Quarter	Time	Plays	Yards	TOP	Team	Scoring information	DET	{{{HomeName}}}
1					Lions	Interception returned 24 yards for touchdown by Barney, Walker kick good	7	0
1					Lions	47-yard field goal by Walker	10	0
2					Lions	Marsh 3-yard touchdown run, Walker kick good	17	0
3					Packers	Pitts 3-yard touchdown run, Chandler kick good	17	7
4					Packers	Pitts 2-yard touchdown run, Chandler kick good	17	14
4					Packers	28-yard field goal by Chandler	17	17
"TOP" = time of possession. For other American football terms, see Glossary of American football.							17	17

==== Week 14 ====
Team	1	2	3	4	Total
Vikings	0	0	3	0	3
• Lions	0	14	0	0	14

- Date: December 17
- Location: Tiger Stadium

=== Standings ===
NFL Central
	W	L	T	PCT	DIV	CONF	PF	PA	STK
Green Bay Packers	9	4	1	.692	4–1–1	6–3–1	332	209	L2
Chicago Bears	7	6	1	.538	3–2–1	5–4–1	239	218	W1
Detroit Lions	5	7	2	.417	1–3–2	3–5–2	260	259	W2
Minnesota Vikings	3	8	3	.273	1–3–2	1–6–3	233	294	L1

Note: Tie games were not officially counted in the standings until 1972.
