= 1974 Detroit Lions season =

NFL team season

- Owner: William Clay Ford Sr.
- Head coach: Rick Forzano
- Home stadium: Tiger Stadium

Results
- Record: 7–7
- Division place: 2nd NFC Central
- Playoffs: Did not qualify
- All-Pros: None
- Pro Bowlers: 2: TE Charlie Sanders; FS Dick Jauron

The 1974 Detroit Lions season was the 45th season in franchise history. It was the Lions' final season playing at Detroit's Tiger Stadium; the team moved to the Pontiac Silverdome the following season and played home games there until the end of the 2001 season.

Prior to the start of training camp, tragedy would strike the Lions, as head coach Don McCafferty died of a heart attack at age 53. He was replaced by Lions assistant Rick Forzano, who guided the Lions to a 7–7 record in their final season at Tiger Stadium.

This would also be the last season until 2011 when Monday Night Football aired in the City of Detroit, as a result of the Lions playing in Pontiac from 1975 to 2001 followed by poor seasons while playing at Ford Field during that stadium's first eight seasons.

== NFL draft ==
1974 Detroit Lions draft
| Round | Pick | Player | Position | College | Notes |
| 1 | 8 | Ed O'Neil | LB | Penn State | from New Orleans |
| 2 | 39 | Billy Howard | DT | Alcorn A&M | |
| 3 | 65 | Dexter Bussey | RB | Texas-Arlington | |
| 5 | 117 | Carl Capria | DB | Purdue | |
| 6 | 139 | Willie Burden | RB | North Carolina State | from New Orleans |
| 6 | 143 | Jim Davis | G | Alcorn A&M | |
| 7 | 169 | Efrén Herrera * | K | UCLA | |
| 8 | 195 | Mike Denimarck | LB | Emporia State | |
| 10 | 247 | David Wooley | RB | Central State (OK) | |
| 11 | 273 | T. C. Blair | TE | Tulsa | |
| 12 | 299 | Mark Wakefield | WR | Tampa | |
| 13 | 325 | Fred Rothwell | C | Kansas State | |
| 14 | 351 | David Jones | DB | Howard Payne | |
| 15 | 377 | John Wells | G | Kansas State | |
| 16 | 403 | Myron Wilson | DB | Bowling Green | |
| 17 | 429 | Collis Temple | DE | LSU | |
Made roster * Made at least one Pro Bowl during career

Notes

- Detroit traded TE Dave Thompson and its first-round pick (13th) to New Orleans in exchange for the Saints' first-round pick (8th) and sixth-round pick in 1975.
- Detroit traded DT Joe Schmiesing to Baltimore in exchange for the Colts' fourth-round pick (84th), and then traded this pick back to the Colts a few weeks later in exchange for K (and occasional WR) Jim O'Brien.
- Detroit traded its fourth-round pick (91st) to St. Louis in exchange for CB Miller Farr.
- Detroit traded LB Ed Mooney to Baltimore in exchange for the Colts' fifth-round pick (109th), and then traded this pick to Atlanta in exchange for DB Willie Germany.
- Detroit traded LB Adrian Young to New Orleans in exchange for the Saints' sixth-round pick (139th).
- Detroit traded its ninth-round selection (221st) to Los Angeles in exchange for G Brian Goodman.

== Personnel ==
=== Staff / Coaches ===
1974 Detroit Lions staff
| Front office: Owner - William Clay Ford, Sr.; Vice President / General manager - Russ Thomas; Executive Vice President - Edwin J. Anderson; Treasurer - Newton S. Peters; Publicity Director / Business Manager - Lyall Smith; Assistant Publicity Director - Elliott Trumbull; Equipment manager - Roy Marklem; Assistant equipment manager - Charles "Rip" Collins; Head coaches: Head coach / Offensive Coordinator – Rick Forzano; Offensive coaches: Offensive Backs - Wally English; Offensive Line - Leon McLaughlin; Wide Receivers - Raymond Berry | Defensive coaches: Defensive Backs / Secondary - Bob Hollway; Defensive Line Coach - Ed Khayat; Linebackers Coach - John Meyer; Special teams coaches: Special teams - Jerry Glanville; Strength and conditioning: Trainer - Kent Falb; Assistant Trainer - Dave Smith |

=== Final roster ===
1974 Detroit Lions roster
| Quarterbacks: 11 Greg Landry; 14 Joe Reed; 17 Sam Wyche; Running backs: 24 Dexter Bussey; 35 Leon Crosswhite; 30 Jim Hooks; 31 Jimmie Jones; 36 Steve Owens; 42 Altie Taylor; Wide receivers: 45 Ray Jarvis; 89 Ron Jessie; 86 Bob Pickard; 49 Larry Walton; Tight ends: 81 T. C. Blair; 88 Charlie Sanders | Offensive linemen: 60 Guy Dennis G/C; 54 Ed Flanagan C; 76 Rocky Freitas T; 64 Gordon Jolley T; 66 Bob Kowalkowski G; 61 Fred Rothwell C; 63 Chuck Walton G; 67 Daryl White G; 75 Jim Yarbrough T; Defensive linemen: 74 Larry Hand DE; 70 Billy Howard DT; 83 Jim Mitchell DT; 88 Herb Orvis DT; 72 Ernie Price DE; 82 Ken Sanders DE; 84 John Small DT | Linebackers: 58 Mike Hennigan OLB; 52 Jim Laslavic MLB; 50 Paul Naumoff OLB; 55 Ed O'Neil MLB; 59 Charlie Weaver OLB; Defensive backs: 20 Lem Barney CB; 46 Carl Capria FS; 29 Ben Davis CB; 39 Bill Frohbose FS; 26 Dick Jauron FS; 23 Levi Johnson CB; 21 Jim Thrower SS; 47 Charlie West SS; 40 Doug Wyatt SS; Special teams: 12 Errol Mann K; 18 Herman Weaver P | Reserve lists: 68 Chuck Bonica C (IR); 87 John Brady TE (IR); 51 Dick Cunningham LB (IR); 65 Jimmie Davis G (IR); 19 Bill Munson QB (IR); 44 Mark Wakefield WR (IR); 28 Mike Weger S (IR); _{47 active, 7 reserve, 0 practice / taxi squad} rookies in italics |

== Regular season ==
=== Schedule ===
| Week | Date | Opponent | Result | Record | Venue | Attendance | Recap |
|---|---|---|---|---|---|---|---|
| 1 | September 15 | at **Chicago Bears** | **L** 9–17 | 0–1 | Soldier Field | 48,134 | Recap |
| 2 | September 22 | **Minnesota Vikings** | **L** 6–7 | 0–2 | Tiger Stadium | 49,703 | Recap |
| 3 | September 29 | at **Green Bay Packers** | **L** 19–21 | 0–3 | Milwaukee County Stadium | 47,292 | Recap |
| 4 | October 6 | at Los Angeles Rams | **L** 13–16 | 0–4 | Los Angeles Memorial Coliseum | 64,987 | Recap |
| 5 | October 14 | San Francisco 49ers | **W** 17–13 | 1–4 | Tiger Stadium | 45,199 | Recap |
| 6 | October 20 | at **Minnesota Vikings** | **W** 20–16 | 2–4 | Metropolitan Stadium | 47,807 | Recap |
| 7 | October 27 | **Green Bay Packers** | **W** 19–17 | 3–4 | Tiger Stadium | 51,775 | Recap |
| 8 | November 3 | New Orleans Saints | **W** 19–14 | 4–4 | Tiger Stadium | 43,256 | Recap |
| 9 | November 10 | at Oakland Raiders | **L** 13–35 | 4–5 | Oakland–Alameda County Coliseum | 51,973 | Recap |
| 10 | November 17 | New York Giants | **W** 20–19 | 5–5 | Tiger Stadium | 40,431 | Recap |
| 11 | November 24 | **Chicago Bears** | **W** 34–17 | 6–5 | Tiger Stadium | 40,930 | Recap |
| 12 | November 28 | Denver Broncos | **L** 27–31 | 6–6 | Tiger Stadium | 51,157 | Recap |
| 13 | December 8 | at Cincinnati Bengals | **W** 23–19 | 7–6 | Riverfront Stadium | 45,159 | Recap |
| 14 | December 15 | at Philadelphia Eagles | **L** 17–28 | 7–7 | Veterans Stadium | 57,157 | Recap |

Note: Intra-division opponents are in bold text.

=== Game summaries ===
==== Week 7 ====
| Team | 1 | 2 | 3 | 4 | Total |
|---|---|---|---|---|---|
| Packers | 0 | 7 | 3 | 7 | 17 |
| • **Lions** | 3 | 6 | 7 | 3 | 19 |

- Date: October 27
- Location: Tiger Stadium • Detroit, Michigan
- Game start: 1:00 p.m.
- Game weather: 48 °F or 8.9 °C • wind 10 miles per hour (16 km/h; 8.7 kn)

Scoring summary
| 1 | DET | Errol Mann 34 yard field goal | Lions 3–0 |
| 2 | DET | Charlie Sanders 11 yard pass from Bill Munson (kick failed) | Lions 9–0 |
| 2 | GB | John Brockington 1 yard run (Chester Marcol kick) | Lions 9–7 |
| 3 | GB | Chester Marcol 49 yard field goal | Packers 10–9 |
| 3 | DET | Larry Walton 39 yard pass from Bill Munson (Errol Mann kick) | Lions 16–10 |
| 4 | GB | Jack Concannon 1 yard run (Chester Marcol kick) | Packers 17–16 |
| 4 | DET | Errol Mann 41 yard field goal | Lions 19–16 |

==== Week 8 ====
| Team | 1 | 2 | 3 | 4 | Total |
|---|---|---|---|---|---|
| Saints | 0 | 14 | 0 | 0 | 14 |
| • Lions | 10 | 6 | 0 | 3 | 19 |

- Date: November 3
- Location: Tiger Stadium, Detroit, Michigan
- Game start: 1:00 p.m.
- Game weather: 56 °F or 13.3 °C, wind 10 miles per hour (16 km/h; 8.7 kn)

Scoring summary
| 1 | DET | Errol Mann 37 yard field goal | Lions 3–0 |
| 1 | DET | Ron Jessie 5 yard pass from Bill Munson (Errol Mann kick) | Lions 10–0 |
| 2 | DET | Levi Johnson 78 yard blocked field goal return (kick failed) | Lions 16–0 |
| 2 | NO | Joel Parker 30 yard pass from Archie Manning (Bill McClard kick) | Lions 16–7 |
| 2 | NO | Howard Stevens 5 yard run (Bill McClard kick) | Lions 16–14 |
| 4 | DET | Errol Mann 35 yard field goal | Lions 19–14 |

=== Standings ===
NFC Central
| | W | L | T | PCT | DIV | CONF | PF | PA | STK |
|---|---|---|---|---|---|---|---|---|---|
| Minnesota Vikings | 10 | 4 | 0 | .714 | 4–2 | 8–3 | 310 | 195 | W3 |
| Detroit Lions | 7 | 7 | 0 | .500 | 3–3 | 6–5 | 256 | 270 | L1 |
| Green Bay Packers | 6 | 8 | 0 | .429 | 3–3 | 4–7 | 210 | 206 | L3 |
| Chicago Bears | 4 | 10 | 0 | .286 | 2–4 | 4–7 | 152 | 279 | L2 |

== See also ==
- 1974 in Michigan
