= Detroit Lions all-time roster =

The Detroit Lions all-time roster is split by name into the following two lists:

- Detroit Lions all-time roster (A–Las)
- Detroit Lions all-time roster (Lat–Z)
