= List of Lenoir–Rhyne Bears in the NFL draft =

This is a list of Lenoir-Rhyne Bears football players in the NFL draft.

== Key ==
B	Back	K	Kicker	NT	Nose tackle
C	Center	LB	Linebacker	FB	Fullback
DB	Defensive back	P	Punter	HB	Halfback
DE	Defensive end	QB	Quarterback	WR	Wide receiver
DT	Defensive tackle	RB	Running back	G	Guard
E	End	T	Offensive tackle	TE	Tight end

== Selections ==
Year	Round	Pick	Overall	Player	Team	Position
1958	9	9	106	Hal Bullard	Baltimore Colts	B
1961	12	13	167	Dick Lage	Cleveland Browns	E
1967	6	17	150	Mike Campbell	St. Louis Cardinals	RB
1968	8	16	208	Wayne Bell	Chicago Bears	RB
1977	12	1	308	Chip Sheffield	Tampa Bay Buccaneers	WR
1993	7	21	189	Craig Keith	Pittsburgh Steelers	TE
1995	7	38	246	Shannon Myers	Miami Dolphins	WR
2000	5	21	150	John Milem	San Francisco 49ers	DE
2020	2	5	37	Kyle Dugger	New England Patriots	DB
2022	7	12	233	Dareke Young	Seattle Seahawks	WR
