= James Roberson =

James Roberson may refer to:

- James Roberson (American football), American football player
- James Roberson (politician), member of the North Carolina House of Representatives
- Lake Roberson (James Lake Roberson Jr.), American football player
