= Grefe =

Grefe is a surname. Notable people with the surname include:

- John Grefe (1947–2013), American chess player
- Ted Grefe (1917–1989), American football player
- William Grefe (born 1930), American film director
