= Saint Mary's College High School =

Private school in Berkeley, California, United States

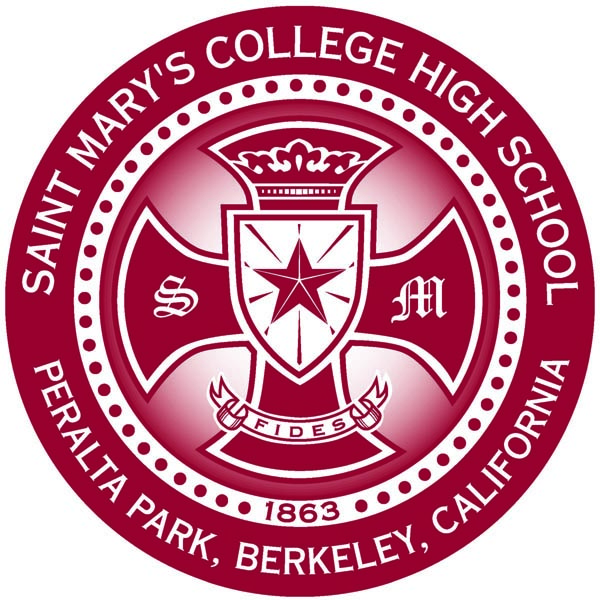

Location
- 1294 Albina Avenue; Berkeley, Alameda County, California 94706; United States; 37°53′.6″N 122°17′1.68″W

Information
- Type: Private, Day, College-prep
- Religious affiliations: Roman Catholic (Christian Brothers)
- Established: July 9, 1863
- Founder: Joseph Alemany
- President: Azure'D Nunley
- Principal: Dr. Sara Troyani
- Faculty: 80
- Grades: 9-12
- Gender: Coeducational
- Campus: Urban
- Color: Red White
- Song: The Alma Mater (The Bells of St. Mary’s)
- Fight song: The Horse
- Athletics conference: CIF North Coast Section
- Mascot: Panthers
- Rival: Salesian High School
- Accreditation: Western Association of Schools and Colleges
- Publication: Paradox (literary magazine)
- Newspaper: The Panther Press
- Yearbook: Peraltan
- Tuition: $24,530 (2025-2026)
- Website: https://www.saintmaryschs.org

Saint Mary's College High School is a coeducational Lasallian Catholic school whose address is in Berkeley, California but whose campus is in Albany, California in the United States. It came into being as part of Saint Mary's College of California, founded in 1863 by the Catholic Church, and put under the auspices of the Institute of the Brothers of the Christian Schools in 1868.

== History ==
In 1853, Joseph Sadoc Alemany was named Archbishop of San Francisco and immediately began to work to strengthen the fledgling system of Catholic education that existed at the time. Among his goals was the establishment of an educational institution for young men with an eye to fostering a home-grown clergy he felt was necessary for the survival of the Church in California. On July 9, 1863, Alemany dedicated the new Saint Mary's College at the end of Old Mission Road in San Francisco near the Mission Dolores.

=== Early years (1868-1927) ===
The school was established in 1863 to provide a grammar school, high school, and college, for young men. It struggled in its first few years and nearly closed in 1868, when the school's management was taken over by eight Christian Brothers, led by Brother Justin McMahon. The Brothers faced formidable difficulties, including financial problems, poor teaching conditions, low enrollment, an earthquake, and an outbreak of smallpox. However, their efforts proved successful. Enrollment increased from 30 to 240 by 1875, and it soon became California's largest educational institution. The grammar school was relocated to the St. Joseph's Academy in Oakland in 1970.

Most students boarded at the college, given its four-mile (6 km) distance from the heart of the city. Board and tuition cost $250 per year; day students paid $60. In 1870, to allow for expansion of the high school and college departments, the Brothers relocated the grammar school from Mission Road to their new St. Joseph's Academy in Oakland.

The San Francisco campus for both the college and high school departments was replaced in 1889 with a new building called "The Brickpile." There were severe fires in 1894 and 1918, which lead to reconstruction. By 1900, tuition and board was $400/year.

In 1927 the high school moved to its current location in Peralta Park and was renamed to Saint Mary's College High School. When school began in August 1927, newly constructed 51,000-square-foot (4,700 m^{2}) De La Salle Hall housed classrooms, dorm rooms, a chapel, offices, and the school cafeteria, and could accommodate 500 students, including 250 boarders.

=== Campus growth (1928-2006) ===
When school began in August 1927, newly constructed 51,000-square-foot (4,700 m^{2}) De La Salle Hall housed classrooms, dorm rooms, a chapel, offices, and the school cafeteria, and could accommodate 500 students, including 250 boarders.

In 1946, a spectacular fire claimed the top two floors of the massive Academy and in 1959 the entire building was razed. Grammar school boarders moved into De La Salle Hall and attended classes in the new Cronin Hall. Older resident students made a home in St. Joseph's Hall (1956), which also housed the school library. Enrollment in 1966 saw 180 Academy students and 611 in the high school. The academy ultimately moved to Mont La Salle in Napa in 1969 and closed completely in the early 1980s. The last high school boarder graduated from Saint Mary's in 1971. That year, the student population numbered 507.

Beloved De La Salle Hall was razed in 1973 as an earthquake hazard. Brother Norman Cook, who taught at the academy from 1952 to 1959, returned to Berkeley as Saint Mary's Principal in 1973. It was a difficult time for the school; enrollment was declining, De La Salle Hall was gone, leaving minimal facilities to accommodate 475 students. The Brothers lived in Vellesian Hall, and Saint Joseph's Hall began its virtually annual metamorphosis to meet school needs.

In his assignment to Saint Mary's, Brother Norman had been given a mandate to “close it up or build it up!” The school community chose transformation. “The possible demise of Saint Mary’s and its embodiment of the Lasallian vision,” Brother Norman reflected years later, “was simply an unacceptable option.” Work began on a facilities master plan and a major fundraising campaign. The Shea Student Center was completed in 1977 and the Brothers Residence in 1978. A later campaign funded the 1986 construction of science and math classrooms in Murphy Hall.

Though campus facilities improved, enrollment steadily declined, reaching a low of about 375 in 1993. The closure of Berkeley's Presentation High for girls added impetus to Saint Mary's consideration of coeducation. In 1995, the gymnasium extension and new auditorium theater were completed as part of the school's Sharing the Spirit transition to coeducation. In August 1995, after 132 years as an all-male school, a 55/45 percent mix of young men and women entered the freshman class, and twenty-two sophomore girls joined ninety-eight male classmates. At commencement exercises on May 31, 1998, graduates spoke of the initial anxiety and apprehension that had given way to achievements and friendships which ultimately united them as Saint Mary's first coed graduating class.

As Saint Mary's marked its 75th year on the Berkeley campus in 2002, Frates Memorial Hall opened, providing eight new classrooms and an amphitheater, gift of Dr. and Mrs. Frank E. Frates Jr., Class of 1927, and donors to the school's successful Creating Futures campaign for the new building and tuition assistance endowment funds.

Over four summers beginning in 2011, the 1952 Cronin Hall classroom building was gutted and retrofitted; work was completed in 2014. That November, the new classroom building was blessed and renamed Brennan Hall. In 2015, the design for Saint Mary's Student Chapel was approved. Ground was broken in Summer 2016, and work on the chapel site got underway. It was completed in early in 2018.

In August 2017, Saint Mary's marked 90 years on the Peralta Park campus.

== Demographics ==
=== Enrollment ===
- Total Enrollment: 630
- Female: 52%
- Male: 48%
- European-American: 37%
- African American: 19%
- Multi-racial/Other: 20%
- Hispanic/Latino: 12%
- East Asian: 4%
- Filipino American: 4%
- Middle Eastern: 2%
- Native American: 1%
- South Asian: 1%

=== Faculty statistics ===
- Total Faculty: 81
- Female: 50%
- Male: 50%
- Student/faculty ratio: 17:1
- Average class size: 25-28 students
- Faculty/staff graduates of Saint Mary's: 28%
- Faculty/staff graduates of a Lasallian school: 64%

== Athletics ==
Saint Mary's sports teams include baseball, cross country, football, boys and girls basketball, boys and girls golf, girls flag football, boys and girls soccer, softball, swimming and diving, boys and girls tennis, track and field, boys and girls volleyball, flag football, and cheerleading.

The 1998 track and field team was ranked ninth in the U.S. The boys basketball team won the Division IV state championship in 2001 and lost in the state championship game in 2008. As of the end of the 2010 cross country season, the boys were attempting to achieve their 25th consecutive league championship and the girls won 13 of the last 15 titles since the school's transition to coeducation in 1995.

Saint Mary's aging multi-purpose field, which was used for football, baseball, soccer, and lacrosse, completed major renovations and reopened in January 2009 as Thomas M. Brady Park, which includes a state-of-the-art turf field.

== Theater ==
The Saint Mary's theater program consists of various student productions throughout the year, including a fall play, a spring musical, and various other music showcases and dance performances. The Stagecraft Club oversees the technical elements of each live production. Most live productions take place in the Saint Mary's auditorium.

== Notable alumni ==
Class years are indicated in parentheses.

- Lorenzo Alexander (2001) - NFL player
- Courtney Brown (2002) - NFL player
- Trestin George (2002) - Professional football player
- Bobby Murphy (2006) - Co-founder of Snapchat
- Marcus Semien (2008) - MLB player ( World Series Champion ) 2023
- Russell Hornsby (1992) - Actor
- Tom Fogerty (1959) - Rhythm guitarist, Creedence Clearwater Revival
- Paul Kantner (1959) - Musician, founding member of Jefferson Airplane
- Michael Wiseman (1985) - Actor
- Ryan Coogler (2003) - American film director and screenwriter
- Shakir Stewart (1991) - Senior VP of A&R at Def Jam Recording
- Dick Mesak - NFL player
- Ed Quinn (1986) - Actor
