= John Greene (American football) =

American collegiate wrestler and football player (1920–2010)

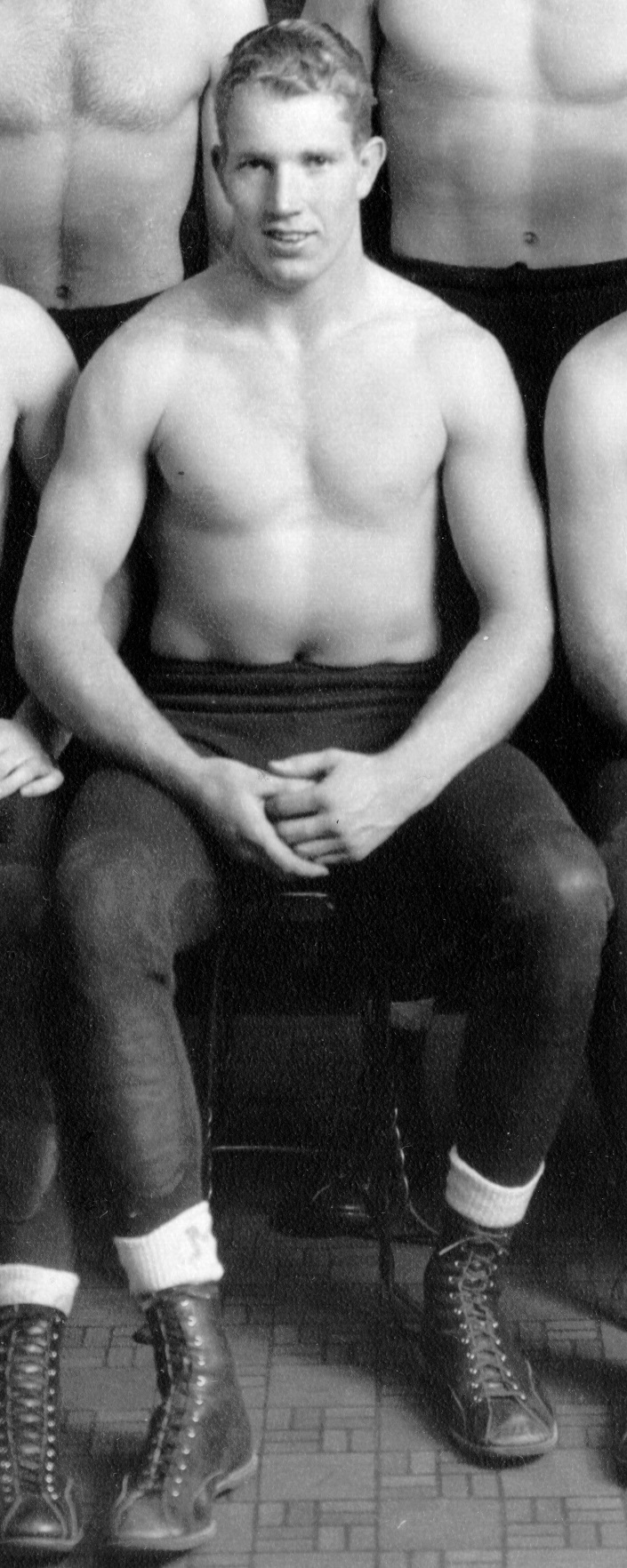
- John Greene from the 1944 Michiganensian (cropped from wrestling team portrait)

No. 10, 81
- Positions: End, back, guard

Personal information
- Born: April 21, 1920; Pittsburgh, Pennsylvania, U.S.
- Died: November 4, 2010 (aged 90); Franklin, Michigan, U.S.
- Listed height: 6 ft 0 in (1.83 m)
- Listed weight: 210 lb (95 kg)

Career information
- High school: Westinghouse (Pittsburgh)
- College: Michigan (1940–1943)
- NFL draft: 1944: 5th round, 35th overall pick

Career history
- Detroit Lions (1944–1950)

Career NFL statistics
- Games: 78
- Starts: 42
- Receptions: 175
- Receiving yards: 2,965
- Touchdowns: 27
- Interceptions: 5
- Stats at Pro Football Reference

John Joseph Greene (April 21, 1920 – November 4, 2010) was an American collegiate wrestler and football player.

Greene competed in wrestling and football at the University of Michigan from 1940 to 1944. He was captain of the Michigan wrestling team in 1944 and was also selected to play in the 11th annual Chicago College All-Star Game that same year. He was inducted into the University of Michigan Athletic Hall of Honor in 1989.

Greene was drafted by the Detroit Lions in the 1944 NFL draft and played seven seasons for the Lions from 1944 to 1950. After moving to the end position in 1945, Greene became a star, ranking among the National Football League (NFL) leaders in receptions and/or receiving yards each year from 1945 to 1949.

He had an 88-yard touchdown reception that was the longest pass play in the NFL during the 1946 season and the longest in Detroit Lions history up to that time. When he retired, he was the Lions' all-time leading receiver with 2,965 receiving yards, 26 touchdown catches, and 173 receptions. He also served as an assistant coach for the Lions during the 1951 season.

== University of Michigan ==
Greene enrolled at the University of Michigan in 1940. While he was a student at Michigan, Greene was a member of the Michigan Wolverines wrestling team coached by Cliff Keen. In 1943, he lost 15 pounds to qualify for the 175-pound weight class. He finished the 1943 season in third place in the Big Ten Conference. In 1944, he was the team captain, compiled a 16–7 record, and was the Big Ten Conference runner up.

Green also played for the Michigan Wolverines football team under head coach Fritz Crisler. In 1940, he played for Michigan's all-freshman team. As a sophomore, he was a 6-foot, 0 inch, 191-pound backup at the quarterback position for the 1941 Michigan Wolverines football team.

Greene remained at Michigan during the World War II years, having been classified 4-F due to a perforated or punctured eardrum. During Greene's junior year, George Ceithaml started all 10 games at quarterback for the 1942 Michigan football team, and Greene became a backup at the tackle position. As a senior, Greene remained a backup at the tackle position, but he was awarded a varsity letter for his contributions to the 1943 Michigan Wolverines football team.

Despite the fact that he was not a starter at Michigan, Greene was invited in the summer of 1944 to participate on the 11th annual Chicago College All-Star Game, an annual game matching a collegiate all-star team against the prior season's NFL championship team.

== Detroit Lions ==
Greene was drafted by the Detroit Lions in the fifth round (35th overall) of the 1944 NFL draft. As a rookie in 1944, Greene appeared in nine games, five of them as a starter. He was used principally as a blocking back.

=== 1945 season ===
Greene pulls down a pass good for 48 yards against the Green Bay Packers, Oct. 7, 1945.

For the 1945 season, the Lions' head coach Gus Dorais moved Greene to the end position after being impressed with his speed. Greene started all 10 games for the Lions at the end position in 1945. He led the 1945 Lions in receiving with 26 receptions for 550 yards (21.2 yards per catch) and five receiving touchdowns. He also ranked fifth among all NFL players in receptions, receiving yards, and yards per catch during the 1945 season.

=== 1946 season ===
Greene's production fell off during the 1946 season, as he appeared in all ten games, but only started two games. The highlight of Greene's 1946 season came in a 17–7 victory (the Lions' only victory in 1946) over the Pittsburgh Steelers on November 10, 1946. In that game, Greene caught a pass from Dave Ryan at midfield and ran the remaining 50 yards for a touchdown. The play, good for an 88-yard gain, was the longest pass play in the NFL during the 1946 season and the longest in Detroit Lions history up to that time. Even with the reduced playing time, Greene's 22 receptions in 1946 ranked eighth in the NFL.

=== 1947 season ===
During the 1947 season, Greene was the Lions' leading receiver for the third straight year. He appeared in 12 games (six as a starter) and caught 38 passes for 621 yards (16.3 yards per catch). He ranked sixth in the NFL in both receptions and receiving yards. Greene's longest reception of the 1947 season was a 47-yard gain on a pass from Roy Zimmerman in a 35–7 victory over the New York Giants. Greene acquired the nickname "the Cinderella Kid" while playing for the Lions, a reference to "his rise to stardom after comparative obscurity while a lineman in college and early in his Lions' career."

=== 1948 season ===
In 1948, Greene led the Lions in receiving yards for the fourth consecutive season. He appeared in 12 games (five as a starter) and caught 25 passes for 595 yards and five touchdowns. His average of 23.8 yards per reception was the best in the NFL.

The 1948 Detroit Lions season was notable for the racial integration of the team. African-American halfback Mel Groomes and end Bob Mann joined the Lions in 1948. Mann and Greene, both University of Michigan alumni, led the Lions' receiving corps. Mann caught 33 passes for 560 yards in 1948, only 35 yards behind Greene.

Wallace Triplett, an African-American player who joined the Lions in 1949, praised Greene for his leadership in welcoming black players. Triplett recalled: "I want to say 'thank you' to John because what we have now in the NFL would not have been possible had it not been for him and others like Bill Dudley. John was a star and a captain for the Lions. So, when he and Bill came over to me in the locker room, shook my hand and welcomed me to the Lions, it made a huge impact in my acceptance on the team and in the League. I will always appreciate what John and Bill did for me."

=== 1949 season ===
For the 1949 season, Greene was selected as a co-captain of the Lions along with Russ Thomas. Greeene appeared in all 12 games for the 1949 Lions, 11 of them as a starter. He had career highs in receptions (44) and receiving touchdowns (7), and ranked seventh and fifth among all NFL players in those two categories.

=== 1950 season ===
The 1950 season was Greene's last in the NFL. The season began on a high note for Greene as he caught a pass from Bobby Layne for a 78-yard gain in a pre-season game against the Pittsburgh Steelers. Greene appeared in all 12 games for the 1950 Lions, but he was not a starter. He caught 22 passes for 368 yards. Cloyce Box and Doak Walker led the 1950 Lions in receiving, as Bobby Layne began his tenure as the team's quarterback.

=== Career statistics ===
Greene played seven seasons in the National Football League, all for the Lions. When he retired after the 1950 season, he was the Lions' all-time leading receiver with 2,965 receiving yards, 26 touchdown catches and 173 receptions.

Greene remained with the Lions in 1951 as an assistant coach. After several consecutive years finishing near the bottom of their division, the 1951 Lions compiled a 7–4–1 record and finished in second place in the NFL National Division.

Legend
	Led the league
**Bold**	Career high

Year	Team	Games		Receiving				
Year	Team	GP	GS	Rec	Yds	Avg	Lng	TD
1944	DET	9	5	0	0	0.0	0	0
1945	DET	10	10	26	550	21.2	63	5
1946	DET	11	2	22	289	13.1	**88**	2
1947	DET	12	6	38	**621**	16.3	47	5
1948	DET	12	5	25	595	**23.8**	83	5
1949	DET	12	12	**42**	542	12.9	28	**7**
1950	DET	12	2	22	368	16.7	46	2
		78	42	175	2,965	16.9	88	26

== Later life ==
Greene lived in Franklin, Michigan, a suburb of Detroit, in his later years. He was inducted into the University of Michigan Athletic Hall of Honor as a wrestler in 1989.

In November 2010, he died at his home in Franklin after a brief illness at age 90. He was survived by his wife Alice and his sister Margaret E. Greene McArdle.
