= Graham P. Smith =

American football executive (1898–1967)

Personal information
- Born: October 18, 1898; Burlington, Iowa
- Died: June 3, 1967 (aged 68); Los Gatos, California

Career history
- Detroit Lions (1941–1942) General manager

Graham Powell Smith (October 18, 1898 – June 3, 1967) was an American businessman sportsman and industrialist who was general manager of the Detroit Lions of the National Football League (NFL) and vice president of Arlington Park.

Smith was born on October 18, 1898, in Burlington, Iowa to P. W. and Lina Lloyd (Patterson) Smith. He served in the United States Marine Corps during World War I.

In 1927, Smith was elected vice president of the Pearsons-Taft Company and was put in charge of the company's new branch in New York City. In 1933, he was appointed receiver of Commonwealth Light & Power. From 1934 to 1941 he was a vice president of F. C. G. Importers.

In 1941, Smith was named general manager of the Detroit Lions. He resigned shortly before the 1942 NFL season to re-enter the Marine Corps. On December 2, 1942, he married Eleonore Rose Thompson of Chicago at Marine Corps Base Quantico. In 1944 he was part of a group that included Bing Crosby and Frank Mandel (cousin of Lions owner Fred L. Mandel Jr.) that sought a National Football League franchise for Los Angeles.

In 1944, Smith became vice president of Davis & Smith, a Chicago importer and distributor. The following year he became vice president and director of Indiana Steel Products. In 1949 he was elected president of the newly formed Powell Announcer Co., which manufactured magnetic recording devices. He also served as vice president of Arlington Park.

Smith retired to Los Gatos, California, where he died on June 3, 1967.
