= Steve Brooks (American football) =

American football player (born 1971)

No. 48
- Position: Tight end

Personal information
- Born: June 2, 1971 (age 55); Detroit, Michigan, U.S.
- Listed height: 6 ft 5 in (1.96 m)
- Listed weight: 245 lb (111 kg)

Career information
- High school: Buena
- College: Occidental
- NFL draft: 1994: undrafted

Career history
- San Francisco 49ers (1994)*; Detroit Lions (1996)
- * Offseason or practice squad member only
- Stats at Pro Football Reference

Steven Edward Brooks (born June 2, 1971) is an American former professional football player who was a tight end for the Detroit Lions of the National Football League (NFL). He played college football for the Occidental Tigers.

Though drafted by the San Francisco 49ers in 1994, Brooks did not play until two years later, when he was signed by the Lions and played his only professional season there.
