= Joe D'Orazio (American football) =

American football player (1914–1972)

No. 60
- Position: End

Personal information
- Born: October 5, 1914; Albion, New York, U.S.
- Died: September 1, 1972 (aged 57)
- Listed height: 5 ft 11 in (1.80 m)
- Listed weight: 220 lb (100 kg)

Career information
- College: Ithaca

Career history
- Detroit Lions (1944)

Career statistics
- Games: 5
- Stats at Pro Football Reference

Joseph T. D'Orazio (October 5, 1914 – September 1, 1972) was an American football player. D'Orazio played college football at Ithaca College from 1932 to 1935 and professional football for the Detroit Lions in 1944.

== Early years and military service ==
A native of Albion, New York, D'Orazio attended Albion High School and Ithaca College. He played college football for the Ithaca Bombers from 1932 to 1935. He was co-captain of the 1935 Ithaca football team.

He graduated from the School of Health and Physical Education in 1936. During World War II, he served in the United States Army. He was discharged from the Army in the fall of 1943 and was hired as a physical and athletic instructor at the Army's Specialized Training Program at Alfred University.

== Professional football ==
In May 1944, D'Orazio was signed by the Washington Redskins of the National Football League (NFL). In late September, D'Orazio was released as part of the final cuts reducing the roster to 28 players. He was then picked up by the Detroit Lions and appeared in five NFL games, one as a starter.

== Later life ==
D'Orazio later worked for 22 years at the Canandaigua Veterans Hospital. He lived in his later years in Clifton Springs, New York. He died in 1972 at age 57.
