= Dick Mesak =

American football player (1920–2009)

Profile
- Position: Tackle

Personal information
- Born: March 1, 1920; San Francisco, California
- Died: October 8, 2009 (aged 89); Redwood City, California
- Listed height: 6 ft 2 in (1.88 m)
- Listed weight: 225 lb (102 kg)

Career information
- High school: Saint Mary's College (Berkeley, California)
- College: Saint Mary's (CA)

Career history
- Detroit Lions (1945)

Career statistics
- Games played: 6
- Games started: 1

Richard Henry Mesak (March 1, 1920 – October 8, 2009) was an American football offensive tackle in the National Football League.
