= Ernie Meyer =

American football player (1904–1979)

Profile
- Position: Guard

Personal information
- Born: June 23, 1904; West Bridgewater, Pennsylvania, U.S.
- Died: January 23, 1979 (aged 74); Paoli, Pennsylvania, U.S.
- Listed height: 6 ft 2 in (1.88 m)
- Listed weight: 200 lb (91 kg)

Career information
- High school: Borger (TX)
- College: Geneva

Career history
- Portsmouth Spartans (1930)
- Stats at Pro Football Reference

Ernest Henry Meyer (June 23, 1904 – January 23, 1979) was an American football player. He played college football for Geneva College and in the National Football League (NFL) as a guard for the Portsmouth Spartans in 1930. He appeared in nine NFL games, five as a starter.
