= Bull Wesley =

American football player (1901–1980)

Profile
- Positions: Center, guard, tackle, fullback

Personal information
- Born: September 26, 1901; Guin, Alabama, U.S.
- Died: January 9, 1980 (aged 78); Tuscaloosa, Alabama, U.S.
- Listed height: 6 ft 1 in (1.85 m)
- Listed weight: 190 lb (86 kg)

Career information
- High school: Marion Co. (AL)
- College: Alabama

Career history
- Providence Steam Roller (1926-1927); New York Giants (1928); Portsmouth Spartans (1930)

Lecil Olen "Bull" Wesley (September 26, 1901 – January 9, 1980) was an American football player.

== Early life ==
Wesley was born in 1901 in Guin, Alabama. His father, J. M. Wesley, was a teacher and principal of the local elementary school. He attended Marion County High School in Guin where he played at multiple positions for the football team and was twice selected as an all-state fullback as a junior and senior.

== Alabama ==
Welsley enrolled at the University of Alabama with the intention of paying college football. He gained the nickname "Bull" when an assistant coach saw him use his brute strength to break through the line during a freshman practice, reportedly said, "My God, he's just like a d___d bull!" In the first game of the 1921 season, Welsey entered the game in the second half with the Crimson Tide trailing, 14-0, and Wesley scored two touchdowns and led a come-from-behind victory. He played for the Alabama Crimson Tide in 1922 and 1923.

== Professional football ==
He also played professional football in the National Football League (NFL) as a center, guard, tackle, and fullback for the Providence Steam Roller (1926-1927), New York Giants (1928), and Portsmouth Spartans (1930). He appeared in 34 or 35 NFL games, including 19 as a starter.

== Family and later years ==
Wesley was married in 1937 to Lillian Clare Hazelwood. They had two children, daughter Joyce and son William Owen. After his football career, Wesley went to work for Monsanto Chemical Co. in Anniston, Alabama. He later worked for a manufacturer of automatic concrete machinery products in Adrian, Michigan. He moved to Cullman, Alabama, in the early 1960s.

Wesley died in 1980 in Tuscaloosa, Alabama.
