= Fred Rothwell =

American football player (born 1952)

No. 61
- Position: Center

Personal information
- Born: October 8, 1952 (age 74); Lafayette, Indiana, U.S.
- Listed height: 6 ft 3 in (1.91 m)
- Listed weight: 240 lb (109 kg)

Career information
- High school: P. K. Yonge (Gainesville, Florida)
- College: Kansas State
- NFL draft: 1974: 13th round, 325th overall pick

Career history
- Detroit Lions (1974)

Career NFL statistics
- Games played: 14
- Games started: 0
- Stats at Pro Football Reference

Donald Fred Rothwell (born October 8, 1952) is an American former professional football player who was a center for one season with the Detroit Lions of the National Football League (NFL) in 1974. He played college football for the Kansas State Wildcats and was selected by the Lions in the 13th round of the 1974 NFL draft.

== Professional career ==
Rothwell was drafted 325th overall in the 13th round by the Detroit Lions in the 1974 NFL draft. Rothwell played 14 games for the Lions in the 1974 season. He was released by Detroit before the start of the next season.

Rothwell was also selected by the World Football League's Jacksonville Sharks in the 1974 WFL Draft, but he never signed with the team.

== Post-playing career ==
Since his retirement, Rothwell has worked as a financial representative for Northwestern Mutual in Topeka, Kansas.
