= Bob Pickard (American football) =

American football player (born 1952)

No. 86
- Position: Wide receiver

Personal information
- Born: September 3, 1952 (age 74); Canton, Ohio, U.S.
- Listed height: 6 ft 0 in (1.83 m)
- Listed weight: 190 lb (86 kg)

Career information
- High school: Central Catholic (OH)
- College: Xavier
- NFL draft: 1974: undrafted

Career history
- Detroit Lions (1974)

Career NFL statistics
- Games played: 14
- Games started: 1
- Stats at Pro Football Reference

Robert Harry Pickard (born September 3, 1952) is an American former professional football player who was a wide receiver for one season with the Detroit Lions of the National Football League (NFL). He played college football for the Xavier Musketeers.

== Professional career ==
Pickard signed with the Detroit Lions as an undrafted free agent following the 1974 NFL draft. He played 14 games for the Lions in the 1974 season, catching eight passes for 88 yards and one touchdown.

=== Career statistics ===
Year	Team	Games		Receiving					Rushing					Fumbles	
Year	Team	GP	GS	Rec	Yds	Avg	Lng	TD	Att	Yds	Avg	Lng	TD	Fum	Lost
1974	DET	14	1	8	88	11.0	18	1	1	5	5.0	5	0	0	0
Career		14	1	8	88	11.0	18	1	1	5	5.0	5	0	0	0
