= Wayne Clark (American football end) =

American football player (1918–1955)

Profile
- Position: End

Personal information
- Born: April 13, 1918; Los Angeles, California
- Died: April 2, 1955 (aged 36); Redondo Beach, California
- Listed height: 6 ft 3 in (1.91 m)
- Listed weight: 210 lb (95 kg)

Career information
- College: Utah

Career history
- Detroit Lions (1944)

Career statistics
- Games: 8
- Stats at Pro Football Reference

Wayne Joseph Clark (April 13, 1918 – April 2, 1955) was an American football player.

A native of Los Angeles, Clark played college football for Utah. He played professional football in the National Football League (NFL) as an end for the Detroit Lions. He appeared in eight NFL games during the 1944 season.

After his playing career ended, he was employed as a purchasing agent in Southern California. He died in 1955 at age 36 when he either fell or jumped from Horseshoe Pier at Redondo Beach, California.
