= Al Barnes (wide receiver) =

American football player (born 1998)

No. 86, 6
- Position: Wide receiver

Personal information
- Born: July 4, 1949 (age 77); Los Angeles, California, U.S.
- Listed height: 6 ft 1 in (1.85 m)
- Listed weight: 170 lb (77 kg)

Career information
- High school: Pasadena (Pasadena, California)
- College: New Mexico State
- NFL draft: 1971: undrafted

Career history
- Dallas Cowboys (1971)*; Detroit Lions (1971–1973); Denver Broncos (1974)*; New York Stars/Charlotte Hornets (1974); New Orleans Saints (1975)*
- * Offseason or practice squad member only
- Stats at Pro Football Reference

Allen Marvin Barnes (born July 4, 1949) is an American former professional football wide receiver who played two seasons for the Detroit Lions of the National Football League (NFL). He played college football at New Mexico State University.

== Early life and college ==
Allen Marvin Barnes was born on July 4, 1949, in Los Angeles, California. He attended Pasadena High School in Pasadena, California.

Barnes played college football for the New Mexico State Aggies of New Mexico State University from 1969 to 1970.

== Professional career ==
Barnes signed with the Dallas Cowboys after going undrafted in the 1971 NFL draft. He was later released.

Barnes was signed by the Detroit Lions on October 29, 1971, after the death of Lions receiver Chuck Hughes on October 24. However, Barnes did not appear in any games during the 1971 season. He played in nine games, starting five, in 1972, catching four passes for 58 yards and one touchdown. He appeared in 11 games, starting two, during the 1973 season, recording three receptions for 43 yards and one touchdown.

On August 20, 1974, Barnes was traded to the Denver Broncos for Jimmie Jones. Barnes was released on September 10, 1974.

Barnes signed with the New York Stars of the World Football League on September 21, 1974. The Stars were later renamed the Charlotte Hornets while the 1974 season was still ongoing. Overall, Barnes caught ten passes for 190 yards and one touchdown for the New York Stars/Charlotte Hornets in 1974.

Barnes signed with the New Orleans Saints on May 6, 1975, but was later released on August 12, 1975.
