= Walt Jurkiewicz =

American football player (1919–2002)

Profile
- Position: Center

Personal information
- Born: February 16, 1919; Scott Haven, Pennsylvania, U.S.
- Died: December 3, 2002 (aged 83); Plymouth, Indiana, U.S.
- Listed height: 6 ft 1 in (1.85 m)
- Listed weight: 220 lb (100 kg)

Career information
- High school: Hamtramck (MI)
- College: Indiana

Career history
- Detroit Lions (1946)

Career statistics
- Games: 11
- Stats at Pro Football Reference

Walter Steven Jurkiewicz (February 16, 1919 – December 3, 2002) was an American football player, teacher, and coach. He played college football for Indiana from 1939 to 1941 and professional football for the Detroit Lions in 1946.

== Early life ==
Born in Scott Haven, Pennsylvania, Jurkiewicz attended Hamtramck High School in Michigan and played college football for Indiana.

After leaving the university, Jurkiewicz worked as a display designer for Montgomery Ward. During World War II, he served in the Navy.

== Professional football ==
After the war, Jurkiewicz played professional football in the National Football League (NFL) as a center for the Detroit Lions. He appeared in 11 NFL games, one as a starter, during the 1946 season.

== Later life ==
From 1947 to 1957, Jurkiewicz was the head football coach at Broad Ripple High School in Indianapolis. He later taught physical education at Plymouth High School and Greenfield High School in Cincinnati. In 1963, he received Dupont's "Play of the Year" contest for a formation he designed known as "screen left." From 1964 to 1984, he taught at Penn High School. He also taught the Polish paper-cutting method, wycinanki, and invented the "Robo-T-Snap machine used for training quarterbacks. He died in 2002 at age 86.
