= Gene Spangler =

American football player (1922–2010)

Profile
- Position: Defensive back

Personal information
- Born: December 17, 1922; Huntington, Arkansas
- Died: December 11, 2010 (aged 87); Sarasota, Florida

Career information
- College: University of Tulsa

Career history
- 1946: Detroit Lions
- Stats at Pro Football Reference

Eugene Douglas Spangler (December 17, 1922 – December 11, 2010) was an American professional football player who was a defensive back for the Detroit Lions of the National Football League (NFL) in 1946. He appeared in six games and made four kick returns for 63 yards. He also made one rush attempt for one yard.

He also played minor league baseball in 1946, hitting .282 with 49 hits in 48 games for the Portland Gulls of the New England League.

== Personal life ==
He was born in Huntington, Arkansas and died in Sarasota, Florida. He attended Coffeyville High School and then University of Tulsa.
