= John McCambridge =

American gridiron football player (born 1944)

No. 86, 74
- Position: Defensive end

Personal information
- Born: August 30, 1944 (age 82); Klamath Falls, Oregon, U.S.
- Listed height: 6 ft 4 in (1.93 m)
- Listed weight: 245 lb (111 kg)

Career information
- High school: Rockhurst (Kansas City, Missouri)
- College: Northwestern (1963-1966)
- NFL draft: 1967: 6th round, 144th overall pick

Career history
- Detroit Lions (1967); New Orleans Saints (1969)*; Kansas City Chiefs (1969)*; Ottawa Rough Riders (1969)
- * Offseason or practice squad member only

Awards and highlights
- Grey Cup champion (1969); Second-team All-Big Ten (1966)

Career NFL statistics
- Sacks: 2
- Stats at Pro Football Reference

John Raymond McCambridge (born August 30, 1944) was an American and Canadian football player who played for the Ottawa Rough Riders and Detroit Lions. He won the Grey Cup with Ottawa in 1969. He previously played college football at Northwestern University.
