= Jimmie Jones (running back) =

American gridiron football player (born 1950)

No. 34, 31, 22
- Position: Running back

Personal information
- Born: June 15, 1950 (age 76); Los Angeles, California, U.S.
- Listed height: 5 ft 10 in (1.78 m)
- Listed weight: 205 lb (93 kg)

Career information
- High school: Manual Arts (Los Angeles)
- College: East Los Angeles (1969–1970); UCLA (1971–1973)
- NFL draft: 1974: undrafted

Career history
- Southern California Sun (1974); Denver Broncos (1974)*; Detroit Lions (1974); BC Lions (1976)*; Hamilton Tiger-Cats (1976)
- * Offseason or practice squad member only
- Stats at Pro Football Reference

Jimmie Lee Jones (born June 15, 1950) is an American former professional football running back who played one season with the Detroit Lions of the National Football League (NFL). He played college football at East Los Angeles College and the University of California, Los Angeles.

== Early life and college ==
Jimmie Lee Jones was born on June 15, 1950, in Los Angeles, California. He attended Manual Arts High School in Los Angeles.

Jones played college football at East Los Angeles College from 1969 to 1970. He then played for the UCLA Bruins of the University of California, Los Angeles from 1971 to 1973. He rushed seven times for 20 yards and one touchdown in 1971 and 19 times for 69 yards and one touchdown in 1972. As a senior in 1973, Jones recorded 27 carries for 176 yards and three touchdowns, and four receptions for 74 yards.

== Professional career ==
Jones signed with the Southern California Sun of the World Football League (WFL) after going undrafted in the 1974 NFL draft. He was on the Sun's roster for two games but did not play, and was then released.

Jones then signed with the Denver Broncos. Due to the 1974 NFL strike, he saw significant action during the preseason. He rushed 16 times for 97 yards and one touchdown in a preseason game against the Minnesota Vikings.

On August 20, 1974, Jones was traded to the Detroit Lions for Al Barnes. Jones played in all 14 games, starting two, for the Lions during the 1974 season, totaling 32 rushing attempts for 147 yards and one touchdown, four catches for 35 yards, 38 kick returns for 927 yards, four fumbles, and one fumble recovery. He was cut by the Lions on September 17, 1975.

Jones signed with the BC Lions of the Canadian Football League in March 1976. He was released on July 17, 1976, before the start of the season.

Jones then signed with the CFL's Hamilton Tiger-Cats. He dressed in one game for the Tiger-Cats in 1976, rushing six times for 20 yards while also catching four passes for 53 yards and returning two kickoffs for 52 yards.
