= Paul Blessing =

American football player (1919–1990)

Profile
- Position: End

Personal information
- Born: January 6, 1919; Tilden, Nebraska, U.S.
- Died: May 6, 1990 (aged 71); Englewood, Colorado, U.S.
- Listed height: 6 ft 4 in (1.93 m)
- Listed weight: 215 lb (98 kg)

Career information
- High school: Ord (NE)
- College: Nebraska-Kearney

Career history
- Detroit Lions (1944)

Career statistics
- Games: 8
- Stats at Pro Football Reference

Paul Theodore Blessing (January 6, 1919 – May 6, 1990) was an American football player.

Blessing was born in Tilden, Nebraska, in 1919. He attended Ord High School in Ord, Nebraska. He helped lead the Ord football team to more than 40 consecutive victories. He played college football for Nebraska-Kearney. He competed in multiple sports at Kearney, winning 11 varsity letters. He graduated from Kearney in May 1942.

After graduating from Kearney in 1942, Blessing rejected offers to play for multiple professional teams, including the Brooklyn Dodgers and New York Giants. He volunteered for military service, but he was rejected due to a punctured ear drum. He worked for a time in an ordnance plant operated by the Guthrie-Tipton Company. He also worked as a football coach in Kewanee, Illinois, and Lexington, Nebraska.

In August 1944, he signed to play professional football in the National Football League (NFL) for the Detroit Lions. He appeared in eight NFL games as an end during the 1944 season.

He was married in December 1942 to Juanita Jillson. In 1945, he became head football coach at Ogallala High School. He died in 1990 in Englewood, Colorado.
