= T. C. Blair =

American football player (born 1951)

No. 81
- Position: Tight end

Personal information
- Born: August 4, 1951 (age 75); Ann Arbor, Michigan, U.S.
- Listed height: 6 ft 4 in (1.93 m)
- Listed weight: 220 lb (100 kg)

Career information
- High school: East Lansing (East Lansing, Michigan)
- College: Tulsa
- NFL draft: 1974: 11th round, 273rd overall pick

Career history
- Detroit Lions (1974)
- Stats at Pro Football Reference

Thomas Calvin Blair (born August 4, 1951) is an American former professional football player who was a tight end for the Detroit Lions of the National Football League (NFL). He played college football for the Tulsa Golden Hurricane.
