= Garvin Mugg =

American football player (1921–1990)

- Mugg, 1946, warming bottle for his baby

Profile
- Position: Tackle

Personal information
- Born: February 19, 1921; Weston, Texas
- Died: October 27, 1990 (aged 69); Tallapoosa, Georgia
- Listed height: 6 ft 1 in (1.85 m)
- Listed weight: 215 lb (98 kg)

Career information
- High school: Anna (TX)
- College: North Texas State

Career history
- Detroit Lions (1945)

Career statistics
- Games: 3
- Stats at Pro Football Reference

Garvin Bray Mugg (February 19, 1921 – October 27, 1990) was an American football player.

Mugg was born in 1921 in Weston, Texas, and attended Anna High School in Anna, Texas. He played college football for North Texas State from 1939 to 1942. After leaving North Texas State, he served in the United States Navy Navy during World War II. While serving in the Navy, he also played for the 1944 Bainbridge Commodores football team that was ranked No. 5 in the final AP poll.

After the war, Mugg returned to his studies at North Texas in September 1945. He received offers from the Philadelphia Eagles, Boston Yanks, Pittsburgh Steelers, and Detroit Lions. He accepted the Lions' bid and reported to the team in August 1946. He played at the tackle position for the Lions during the 1945 season, appearing in three NFL games. He continued working on his master's degree thesis in industrial arts while playing for the Lions.

Mugg was married to Dorothy Alma Greene. They had a son, Edwin Mugg.

Garvin Mugg died in 1990 in Tallapoosa, Georgia.
