= Frank Kring =

American football player (1918–1962)

- Frank Kring, c. 1962

Profile
- Positions: Linebacker, fullback

Personal information
- Born: October 21, 1918; Lometa, Texas, U.S.
- Died: November 26, 1962 (aged 44); Lake Worth, Texas, U.S.
- Listed height: 6 ft 0 in (1.83 m)
- Listed weight: 190 lb (86 kg)

Career information
- High school: R. L. Paschal (TX)
- College: TCU

Career history
- Detroit Lions (1945)

Awards and highlights
- National champion (1938)

Career statistics
- Games: 5
- Stats at Pro Football Reference

Frank Henry Kring (October 21, 1918 – November 26, 1962) was an American football player.

A native of Lometa, Texas, Kring attended R. L. Paschal High School in Fort Worth, Texas. He played college football as a fullback for TCU from 1938 to 1941. He also served in the United States Coast Guard.

He played professional football in the National Football League (NFL) as a linebacker for the Detroit Lions. He appeared in five NFL games, one or two as a starter, during the 1945 season.

King later worked as a teacher and coach in the Lake Worth, Texas, public schools. He eventually became assistant principal at Lake Worth High School. He died in 1962 at age 44.
