= Jim Jones (American football, born 1920) =

American football player (1920–1989)

No. 42, 6
- Position: Back

Personal information
- Born: December 15, 1920; Florence, Alabama, U.S.
- Died: April 7, 1989 (aged 68); Florence, Alabama, U.S.
- Listed height: 6 ft 0 in (1.83 m)
- Listed weight: 175 lb (79 kg)

Career information
- High school: Coffee (Florence)
- College: Union (TN)
- NFL draft: 1943: 6th round, 41st overall pick

Career history
- Detroit Lions (1946); Charlotte Clippers (1946–1949)

Awards and highlights
- All-Dixie League (1946)

Career NFL statistics
- Rushing yards: 3
- Rushing average: 1
- Stats at Pro Football Reference

James Alexander "Casey" Jones (December 15, 1920 – April 7, 1989) was an American professional football back who played one season with the Detroit Lions of the National Football League (NFL). He was selected by the Lions in the sixth round of the 1943 NFL draft after playing college football at Union University.

== Early life and college ==
James Alexander Jones was born on December 15, 1920, in Florence, Alabama. He attended Coffee High School in Florence.

Jones played college football for the Union Bulldogs of Union University, with his final year being in 1942.

== Professional career ==
Jones was selected by the Detroit Lions in the sixth round, with the 41st overall pick, of the 1943 NFL draft. After serving in the United States Navy during World War II, he signed with the Lions in 1946. He played in two games for the Lions during the 1946 season, recording three kick returns for 44 yards, three rushes for three yards, four incomplete passes for one interception, and one punt for negative nine yards. Jones was released by the Lions on October 7, 1946.

Jones then played in seven games, starting six, for the Charlotte Clippers of the Dixie League in 1946, totaling five receiving touchdowns, two punt return touchdowns, 53 carries for 356 yards and one touchdown, and 20 completions on 35 passing attempts (57.1%) for 254 yards and two touchdowns. He earned all-league honors for his performance during the 1946 season. He appeared in 15 games, starting 14, for the Clippers in 1947. He played in 12 games, starting ten, for Charlotte during the 1948 season. Jones appeared in 13 games, starting eight, in 1949.

== Personal life ==
Jones' brother, Ralph Jones also played for the 1946 Lions. Jim Jones died on April 7, 1989, in Florence.
