= Dick Weber (American football) =

American football player (1919–1991)

- Dick Weber, 1940

Profile
- Position: Halfback

Personal information
- Born: April 10, 1919; Lawrence, Massachusetts
- Died: November 19, 1991 (aged 72); Salem, New Hampshire
- Listed height: 5 ft 11 in (1.80 m)
- Listed weight: 195 lb (88 kg)

Career information
- High school: Lawrence (MA)
- College: Saint Louis (1938–1941); Fort Benning (1945)

Career history
- Detroit Lions (1945); Paterson Panthers (1946)

Career statistics
- Games: 3
- Stats at Pro Football Reference

Richard Wilfred Weber (April 10, 1919 – November 19, 1991) was an American football player.

Weber was born in Lawrence, Massachusetts. He attended Lawrence High School.

Weber then attended Saint Louis University in St. Louis. He played college football for the Saint Louis Bililkens from 1938 to 1941. During World War II, he served in the Army from 1942 to 1945. He also starred on the 1945 Fort Benning Doughboys football team. He also played for Fort Benning's basketball and baseball team's before being discharged in October 1945.

After his discharge, Weber played professional football in the National Football League (NFL) as a halfback for the Detroit Lions. He played for the Lions in the final three games of the 1945 season. He also played in 1946 at quarterback for the Paterson Panthers of the American Football League.

Weber died in 1991 at Salem, New Hampshire.
