= Jack Matheson (American football) =

American football player (1920–1997)

Profile
- Positions: End, guard

Personal information
- Born: June 9, 1920; Detroit, Michigan
- Died: February 14, 1997 (aged 76)
- Listed height: 6 ft 2 in (1.88 m)
- Listed weight: 221 lb (100 kg)

Career information
- High school: Lake View
- College: Western Michigan

Career history
- Detroit Lions (1943–1946); Chicago Bears (1946)

Career statistics
- Games played: 73
- Receptions: 944
- Receiving yards: 27
- Stats at Pro Football Reference

Jack Kenneth Matheson (June 9, 1920 – February 14, 1997) was an American football player.

A native of Detroit, he played college football at Western Michigan College of Education (later renamed Western Michigan University). He later played professional football at the guard and end positions in the National Football League (NFL) for five seasons for the Detroit Lions (1943-1946) and Chicago Bears (1947). He appeared in 42 NFL games, 32 of them as a starter, and totaled 73 receptions for 944 yards. During his four seasons with the Lions, he set the club's career record (later broken) with 73 receptions, breaking a record previously held by Lloyd Cardwell. He also set the Lions' single-season record with 23 receptions in 1944, though his mark was eclipsed the following year by John Greene.

While playing professional football, Matheson also worked as a toolmaker. Matheson died at age 76 in 1997 in Okeechobee County, Florida.
