= Jerry Zawadzkas =

American football player (1946–2008)

No. 85, 87
- Position: Tight end

Personal information
- Born: January 3, 1946; Torrington, Connecticut, U.S.
- Died: September 3, 2008 (aged 62); Albuquerque, New Mexico, U.S.
- Listed height: 6 ft 4 in (1.93 m)
- Listed weight: 220 lb (100 kg)

Career information
- High school: Torrington (CT)
- College: Columbia (1963-1966)
- NFL draft: 1967: 16th round, 401st overall pick

Career history
- Detroit Lions (1967); New York Jets (1968)*; Bridgeport Jets (1968)
- * Offseason or practice squad member only

Career NFL statistics
- Games played: 2
- Stats at Pro Football Reference

Gerald Anthony "Jerry" Zawadzkas (January 3, 1946 - September 3, 2008) was an American professional football tight end who played in one season, for the Detroit Lions. He also played for the Bridgeport Jets.

== Early life and education ==
Jerry Zawadzkas was born on January 3, 1946, in Torrington, Connecticut and attended Torrington High School. He went to college at Columbia.

== Professional career ==
Detroit Lions

He was drafted in the 16th round (401st overall) by the Detroit Lions. In his first season, he only had one statistic; a 0-yard kick return. He also appeared in the film "Paper Lion".

New York Jets

In 1968, he was signed by the New York Jets. He was later sent to the Bridgeport Jets. 1968 was the year the Jets won the Super Bowl.

Bridgeport Jets

When he was with the Bridgeport Jets, he scored two touchdowns. He did not play anymore after 1968.

== Later life and death ==
After playing football, he went to City College of New York to get a Master's Degree in physics. After getting a masters degree, he worked at Exxon Research Center. In 1978, he moved to Albuquerque, New Mexico to become a scientist at Sandia National Laboratories. He was a nuclear and radiation researcher. He retired in 2003. He died on September 3, 2008, in Albuquerque, New Mexico. He was 62 at the time of his death. He was survived by his wife, three sons, daughter, and four grandchildren.
