= Carl Capria =

American football player (born 1952)

No. 46, 29
- Position: Defensive back

Personal information
- Born: June 8, 1952 (age 74); The Bronx, New York, U.S.
- Listed height: 6 ft 3 in (1.91 m)
- Listed weight: 185 lb (84 kg)

Career information
- High school: Franklin Square (NY) H. Frank Carey
- College: Purdue
- NFL draft: 1974: 5th round, 117th overall pick

Career history
- Detroit Lions (1974); New York Jets (1975)
- Stats at Pro Football Reference

Carl Capria (born June 8, 1952) is an American former professional football player who was a defensive back in the National Football League (NFL). He played for the Detroit Lions in 1974 and for the New York Jets in 1975.

Capria was an All-American sprinter for the Purdue Boilermakers track and field team, finishing 3rd in the 4 × 100 meters relay at the 1972 NCAA University Division Outdoor Track and Field Championships.
