= Ted Grefe =

American football player (1917–1989)

- Ted Grefe, December 1941

Profile
- Position: End

Personal information
- Born: October 26, 1917; Des Moines, Iowa
- Died: October 27, 1989 (aged 72); Buffalo, South Dakota
- Listed height: 6 ft 0 in (1.83 m)
- Listed weight: 205 lb (93 kg)

Career information
- High school: Roosevelt (IA)
- College: Northwestern

Career history
- Detroit Lions (1945)

Career statistics
- Games: 2
- Stats at Pro Football Reference

Theodore Fred Grefe (October 26, 1917 – October 27, 1989) was an American football player.

Born in Des Moines, Iowa, Grefe attended Roosevelt High School and played college football for Northwestern. He served in the U.S. Navy and was stationed on a destroyer at Pearl Harbor until being transferred to submarine service shortly before the Japanese attack. He played professional football in the National Football League (NFL) as a defensive end for the Detroit Lions. He appeared in two NFL games during the 1945 season.

After his football career, Grefe lived in Des Moines, Iowa, and later in Fairfax, Virginia. He died in 1989 at Buffalo, South Dakota, while returning home from a hunting trip. He and his wife, June, had two daughters (Carolyn and Lauren) and one son (Duston).
