= Roy Stuart (American football) =

American football player (1920–2013)

Profile
- Position: Guard

Personal information
- Born: July 25, 1920; Shawnee, Oklahoma, US
- Died: February 27, 2013 (aged 92); Tulsa, Oklahoma, US

Career information
- College: Tulsa

Career history
- 1942: Cleveland Rams
- 1943: Detroit Lions
- 1946: Buffalo Bisons

Roy J. Stuart Jr. (July 25, 1920 – February 27, 2013) was an American professional football player who was a guard in the National Football League (NFL) and All-America Football Conference (AAFC). He played college football for the Tulsa Golden Hurricane. He played in the NFL for the Cleveland Rams and Detroit Lions, and (after serving in World War II) the AAFC's Buffalo Bisons.

Stuart graduated from Shawnee High School in 1938 where he was an All-State football player. He then played college football at the University of Tulsa, on both offense and defense and was named the outstanding lineman in Tulsa's first bowl game (the 1941 Sun Bowl).

He played professionally for two years then went into the navy in 1943. He was part of the Norman Okla Naval Air Station Zoomers football team before being assigned aboard ship. He was on the USS Bunker Hill when it suffered a Kamikaze attack. Nearly 700 sailors and airmen were killed, injured or missing. After the war he played another year of pro football then returned to his hometown of Shawnee and became the head football coach for one year. He then worked in the oil business in Tulsa. Stuart was elected to Tulsa's athletic hall of fame in 1993.
