= Lake Roberson =

American football player (1918–1984)

Profile
- Position: Defensive end

Personal information
- Born: August 5, 1918; Clarksdale, Mississippi, U.S.
- Died: December 11, 1984 (aged 66); Lyon, Mississippi, U.S.
- Listed height: 6 ft 1 in (1.85 m)
- Listed weight: 210 lb (95 kg)

Career information
- College: Ole Miss

Career history
- Richmond Arrows (1941); Detroit Lions (1945)

Career statistics
- Games: 4
- Stats at Pro Football Reference

James Lake Roberson Jr. (August 5, 1918 – December 11, 1984) was an American football player. He played college football for Ole Miss from 1937 to 1940 and professional football for the Richmond Arrows in 1941 and the Detroit Lions in 1945.

== Early life ==
Roberson was born in 1918 at Clarksdale, Mississippi. He attended Clarksdale High School and was president of the school's class of 1937. He then attended the University of Mississippi and played college football as an end for Ole Miss from 1937 to 1940. He also was a member of the Ole Miss boxing team. He graduated with honors from Mississippi.

== Professional football ==
He played professional football in the Dixie Football League for the Richmond Arrows, appearing in 10 games during the 1941 season. He played football for the Army's Randolph Field football team and also served in military intelligence in the Pacific Theatre of Operations. After the war, he played in the National Football League (NFL) as an end for the Detroit Lions. He appeared in four NFL games during the 1945 season.

== Later life ==
His brother, Shed Roberson worked as an attorney. In 1934, he served as assistant manager of the campaign staff for U.S. Senator Hubert D. Stephens. After two years in private practice, he became a special agent of the Federal Bureau of Investigation. He jointed the U.S. Marine Corps in 1944.

Lake Roberson was married in 1943 to Yvette Williams. He died in 1984 at Lyon, Mississippi.
