= Bob Layden =

American football player (1920–2000)

- Layden from the 1942 Moundbuilder

Profile
- Positions: End, tackle

Personal information
- Born: January 21, 1920; Frontenac, Kansas, US
- Died: September 28, 2000 (aged 80); Frontenac, Kansas, US
- Listed height: 6 ft 0 in (1.83 m)
- Listed weight: 195 lb (88 kg)

Career information
- High school: Frontenac (KS)
- College: Southwestern (KS)

Career history
- Detroit Lions (1943)

Career statistics
- Games: 4
- Stats at Pro Football Reference

Robert Layden (January 21, 1920 – September 28, 2000) was an American football player.

A native of Frontenac, Kansas, Layden attended Frontenac High School and played college football at Southwestern College in Winfield, Kansas.

Layden also played professional football in the National Football League (NFL) as an end and tackle for the Detroit Lions. He appeared in four NFL games during the 1943 season.

He died in 2000 at age 80 and was buried at the Garden of Memories Cemetery in Pittsburg, Kansas.
