= Denis Moore (American football) =

American football player (1944-1995)

No. 70, 74
- Position: Defensive tackle

Personal information
- Born: July 18, 1944; Berkeley, California, U.S.
- Died: May 27, 1995 (aged 50); Spokane, Washington, U.S.
- Listed height: 6 ft 5 in (1.96 m)
- Listed weight: 255 lb (116 kg)

Career information
- High school: Westchester (Los Angeles, California)
- College: USC
- NFL draft: 1966: 14th round, 211th overall pick
- AFL draft: 1966: 11th round, 96th overall pick

Career history
- Detroit Lions (1967–1969); Philadelphia Eagles (1970)
- Stats at Pro Football Reference

James Denis Moore III (July 18, 1944 – May 27, 1995) was an American professional football player who was a defensive tackle for the Detroit Lions and Philadelphia Eagles of the National Football League (NFL). He played college football for the University of Southern California.
