= Ralph Jones (American football player) =

American football player (1922–1995)

Profile
- Positions: End, defensive end

Personal information
- Born: February 14, 1922; Florence, Alabama, U.S.
- Died: February 18, 1995 (aged 73)
- Listed height: 6 ft 3 in (1.91 m)
- Listed weight: 200 lb (91 kg)

Career information
- High school: Coffee (AL)
- College: Union (TN), Alabama

Career history
- Detroit Lions (1946); Baltimore Colts (1947)

Awards and highlights
- Second-team All-SEC (1944)

Career statistics
- Games: 17
- Stats at Pro Football Reference

.

Ralph Carroll Jones (February 14, 1922 – February 18, 1995) was an American football player.

Born in Florence, Alabama, Jones attended Coffee High School and played college football for Union (TN) and Alabama. While serving in the Navy, he played for the Great Lakes Navy Bluejackets during the 1945 season and appeared in the final wartime matchup against Notre Dame on December 1, 1945. He played professional football in the National Football League (NFL) as an end and defensive end for the Detroit Lions in 1946 and Baltimore Colts in 1947. He appeared in 17 NFL games, one as a starter He also played professional basketball. His brother Jim Jones also played for the 1946 Lions.
