= Leon Fichman =

American football player (1921–2009)

- Fichman with the Detroit Lions

No. 46
- Positions: Tackle, placekicker

Personal information
- Born: February 23, 1921; Los Angeles, California, U.S.
- Died: August 31, 2009 (aged 88); Silvis, Illinois, U.S.
- Listed height: 6 ft 1 in (1.85 m)
- Listed weight: 215 lb (98 kg)

Career information
- High school: Los Angeles
- College: Alabama

Career history
- Detroit Lions (1946–1947)

Career statistics
- Games: 12
- Stats at Pro Football Reference

Leon "Lee" Fichman (February 23, 1921 – August 31, 2009) was an American football player and educator.

Born in Los Angeles, Fichman worked as a child actor and attended Los Angeles High School. In the 1932 film "Slide, Babe, Slide", he pitched to Babe Ruth. He played college football for Alabama from 1941 to 1943. He played tackle for Alabama and also handled placekicking. He played for the 1942 Alabama team but was unable to play in the 1943 Orange Bowl due to an ankle injury.

During World War II, he served in the United States Army, including service at the Battle of the Bulge. After the war, he played professional football in the National Football League (NFL) as a tackle for the Detroit Lions. He appeared in 11 NFL games during the 1946 season (five as a starter) and one during the 1947 season.

Fichman worked as a physical education teacher in Tulsa between the 1946 and 1947 seasons. He later worked as a science teacher in Glendale, California, for 28 years. He moved to East Moline, Illinois, in 1960 and worked for 16 years at Arrowhead Ranch.
