= Alex Ketzko =

American football player (1919–1944)

Profile
- Position: Tackle

Personal information
- Born: November 19, 1919; Chicago, Illinois
- Died: December 23, 1944 (aged 25); France
- Listed height: 5 ft 11 in (1.80 m)
- Listed weight: 215 lb (98 kg)

Career information
- High school: Mattawan (MI)
- College: Michigan State
- NFL draft: 1940: undrafted

Career history
- Paterson Panthers (1940); New York Giants (1943)*; Detroit Lions (1943)
- * Offseason or practice squad member only
- Stats at Pro Football Reference

Alexander Gregorieff Ketzko (November 19, 1919 – December 23, 1944) was an American football player.

A native of Chicago, he moved with his family to Mattawan, Michigan as a boy. He played college football for Michigan State College (later known as Michigan State University) in 1938 and 1939. In July 1940, he signed to play professional football for the Paterson Panthers of the American Professional Football Association. He signed with the National Football League's New York Giants before being traded to the Detroit Lions. He appeared in nine games during his rookie year of 1943. During the season, he attended a military draft ceremony but remained with the Lions until the end of the year.

Upon being inducted into the United States Army, he was deployed to Europe in May 1944 with the 15th Infantry Regiment, 3rd Division, 7th Army. Private First Class Ketzko was killed in action in Alsace in December at age 25.
