= Ted Cremer =

American football player (1919–1980)

No. 21, 85, 18
- Position: Defensive end/End

Personal information
- Born: March 16, 1919; Corbin, Kentucky, U.S.
- Died: November 20, 1980 (aged 61); Birmingham, Alabama, U.S.
- Listed height: 6 ft 2 in (1.88 m)
- Listed weight: 209 lb (95 kg)

Career information
- High school: Phillips (Alabama)
- College: Auburn

Career history
- Detroit Lions (1946–1948); Green Bay Packers (1948)

Career statistics
- Receiving attempts: 28
- Receiving yards: 296
- Touchdowns: 1
- Stats at Pro Football Reference

Theodore Roosevelt Cremer (March 16, 1919 – November 20, 1980) was an American professional football player in the National Football League (NFL). He played college football for the Auburn Tigers.

== Biography ==
Cremer was born March 16, 1919, in Corbin, Kentucky.

== Career ==
Cremer played two seasons with the Detroit Lions before splitting the 1948 NFL season between the Lions and the Green Bay Packers. He played at the collegiate level at Auburn University.
