= Ernie Rosteck =

American football player (1922–1986)

- Rosteck, 1947

Profile
- Position: Center

Personal information
- Born: May 12, 1922; Detroit, Michigan, U.S.
- Died: March 1, 1986 (aged 63); Waterloo, Iowa, U.S.
- Listed height: 6 ft 1 in (1.85 m)
- Listed weight: 218 lb (99 kg)

Career information
- High school: Southeastern (MI)

Career history
- Detroit Lions (1943–1944); Los Angeles Bulldogs (1945–1946); Paterson Panthers (1947)

Career statistics
- Games: 10
- Stats at Pro Football Reference

Ernest W. Rosteck (May 12, 1922 – March 1, 1986) was an American football player.

Rosteck was born in Detroit in 1922. He attended Detroit's Southeastern High School.

He played professional football in the National Football League (NFL) as a center for the Detroit Lions. He appeared in 10 NFL games during the 1943 and 1944 seasons. He was released by the Lions in September 1945. He also played professional football for the Los Angeles Bulldogs of the Pacific Coast Football League in 1945 and 1946 and the Patterson Panthers in 1947.

He later worked for John Deere as a machinist. He died of an apparent cardiac arrest in 1986 at Allen Memorial Hospital in Waterloo, Iowa.
