= Lew Kamanu =

American football player (born 1944)

No. 85
- Position: Defensive end

Personal information
- Born: April 9, 1944 (age 82); Honolulu, Hawaii, U.S.
- Listed height: 6 ft 4 in (1.93 m)
- Listed weight: 245 lb (111 kg)

Career information
- High school: Farrington
- College: Weber State
- NFL draft: 1967: 4th round, 88th overall pick

Career history
- Detroit Lions (1967–1968)
- Stats at Pro Football Reference

Lewellyn K. Kamanu (born April 9, 1944) is an American former professional football player who was a defensive end for the Detroit Lions of the National Football League (NFL). He played college football for the Weber State University
