= Mike Campbell (running back) =

American football player (born 1945)

No. 21
- Position: Running back

Personal information
- Born: May 29, 1945 (age 81); Altavista, Virginia, U.S.
- Listed height: 5 ft 11 in (1.80 m)
- Listed weight: 200 lb (91 kg)

Career information
- High school: Altavista
- College: Lenoir–Rhyne
- NFL draft: 1967: 6th round, 150th overall pick

Career history
- Detroit Lions (1968)
- Stats at Pro Football Reference

Michael Linwood Campbell (born May 29, 1945) is an American former professional football player who was a running back for the Detroit Lions of the National Football League (NFL). He played college football for the Lenoir–Rhyne Bears.
