= Buzz Trebotich =

American football player (1920–1992)

Profile
- Position: Blocking back

Personal information
- Born: December 30, 1920; Oakland, California, U.S.
- Died: August 4, 1992 (aged 71); Napa, California, U.S.
- Listed height: 5 ft 10 in (1.78 m)
- Listed weight: 208 lb (94 kg)

Career information
- High school: St. Mary's College (CA)
- College: Saint Mary's

Career history
- Oakland Giants (1943); Detroit Lions (1944–1945); Oakland Giants (1945–1946); Baltimore Colts (1947)

Career statistics
- Games: 21
- Stats at Pro Football Reference

Ivan Peter "Buzz" Trebotich (December 30, 1920 – August 4, 1992) was an American football player. He played college football for the Saint Mary's Gaels and professional football for the Oakland Giants (1943, 1945–1946), Detroit Lions (1944–1945), and Baltimore Colts (1947).

== Early life ==
A native of Oakland, California, Trebotich attended Saint Mary's High School and played college football for the Saint Mary's Gaels.

== Professional career ==
Trebotich began his professional football in 1943 with the Oakland Giants of the Pacific Coast Professional Football League. The following year, he joined the Detroit Lions of the National Football League (NFL). He appeared in 19 NFL games, five as a starter, as a blocking back for the Lions during the 1944 and 1945 seasons.

In December 1945, Trebotich returned to the Oakland Giants. He continued to play for the Giants in 1946 on loan from the Lions.

Trebotich concluded his professional football career in 1947 with the Baltimore Colts of the All-America Football Conference (AAFC).

== Family and later life ==
Trebotich was married to Patty Cordy in 1943 in Calistoga, California. They had three children: Jon Van Trebotich; Neal Ward Trebotich; and Ann Christine (Trebotich) Miles. After retiring from football, he worked for 27 years as a sales manager for Canada Dry. He moved to Napa, California, in 1989 and was inducted into the Saint Mary's Hall of Fame in 1991.
