= Dave Ryan (American football) =

American football player (1923–1988)

No. 44, 20
- Position: Quarterback

Personal information
- Born: February 3, 1923; Kaufman, Texas, U.S.
- Died: December 5, 1988 (aged 65); Kaufman, Texas, U.S.

Career information
- College: Hardin–Simmons

Career history
- Detroit Lions (1945–1947); Boston Yanks (1948)

Career statistics
- TD–INT: 9–27
- Passing yards: 1,296
- Passer rating: 41.1
- Stats at Pro Football Reference

David Henry Ryan (February 3, 1923 – December 5, 1988) was an American football quarterback in the National Football League (NFL). He played for the Detroit Lions and Boston Yanks. He played college football for Hardin–Simmons.
