= Al Kaporch =

American football player (1913–2004)

- Al Kaporch, 1944

Profile
- Positions: Tackle, guard

Personal information
- Born: October 6, 1913; Jenkins Township, Pennsylvania
- Died: October 14, 2004 (aged 91); Plains Township, PA
- Listed height: 5 ft 10 in (1.78 m)
- Listed weight: 215 lb (98 kg)

Career information
- College: St. Bonaventure

Career history
- Detroit Lions (1943–1945)

Career statistics
- Games: 22
- Stats at Pro Football Reference

Albin John "Al" Kaporch (October 6, 1913 – October 14, 2004) was an American football player.

Kaporch was born in 1913 in Jenkins Township, Pennsylvania. His father was a Lithuanian immigrant who worked in the Pennsylvania coal mines and died in a mine collapse. He attended Pittston High School and played college football at St. Bonaventure. H

He played professional football in the National Football League (NFL) as a tackle and guard for the Detroit Lions from 1943 to 1945. He appeared in 22 NFL games, 21 as a starter, and tallied three interceptions.

After his playing career, Kaporch lived in Dearborn Heights, Michigan, and worked as an accountant for Ford Motor Company. He returned to Pennsylvania in 1972.

He married Helen Ann Janoski in 1951. She predeceased him in 1974. He died in 2004 at the Geisnger Wyoming Valley Medical Center in Plains Township, Pennsylvania.
