= Prairie View Interscholastic League =

The Prairie View Interscholastic League (PVIL) was the organization that governed academic and athletic competitions between African-American high schools in Texas for much of the 20th century. The organization's structure and operations were similar to the University Interscholastic League (UIL) and it disbanded shortly after the UIL admitted black high schools in the 1960s. A number of former PVIL football players were inducted into the Pro Football Hall of Fame after successful professional careers.

== History ==
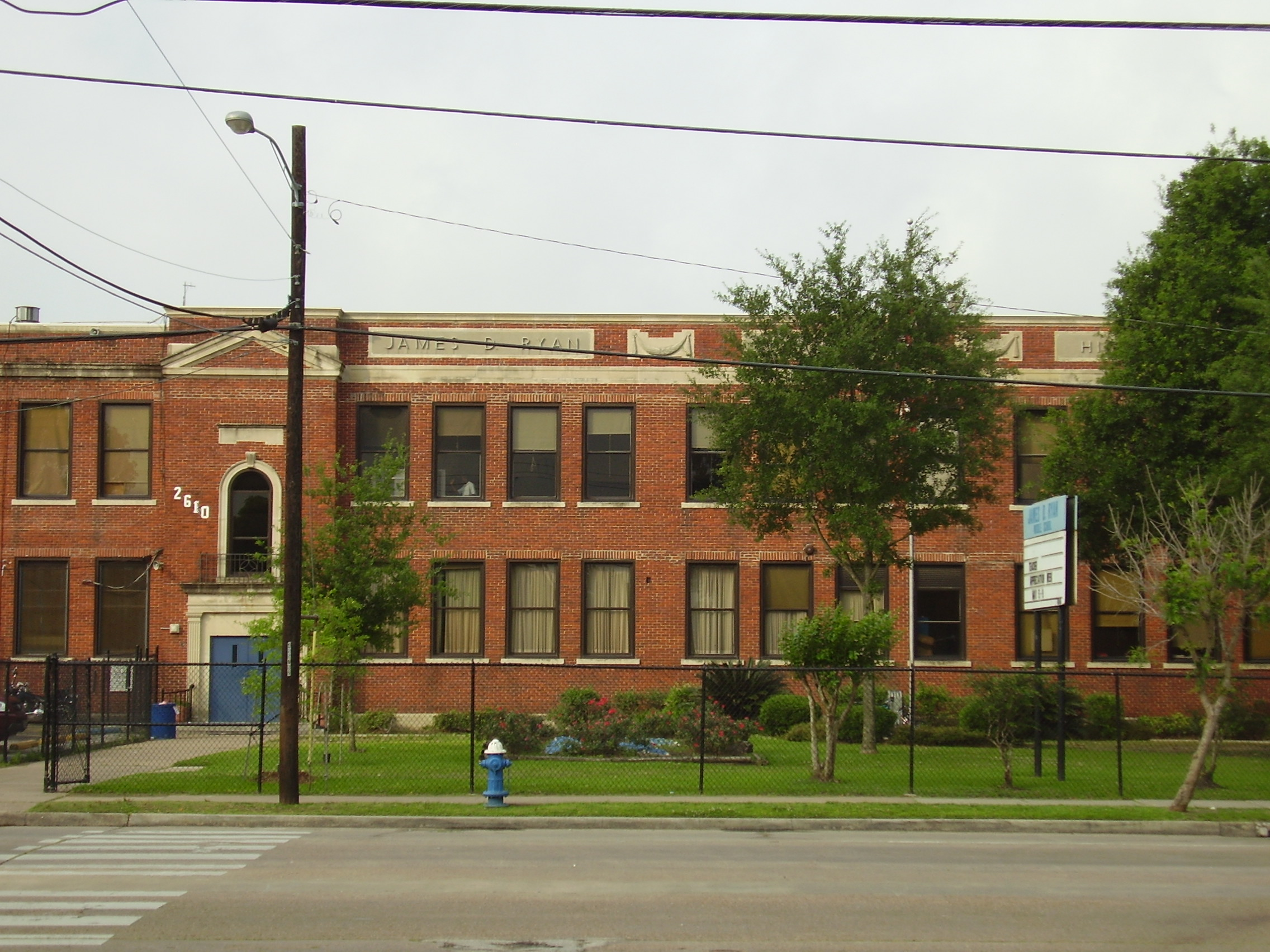
Yates High School (Houston), former member of the PVIL, was located in this building in 1939. That year the principal of Yates met with the Prairie View A&M to discuss establishing an American football league for black schools

The Texas Interscholastic League of Colored Schools (TILCS) was formed in 1920 by the Colored Teachers State Association of Texas and the Negro School Division of the State Department of Education. In 1923, TILCS came under the control of Prairie View A & M College and its name became the Prairie View Interscholastic League. PVIL competitions included athletic events, extemporaneous speaking, declamation and music. By 1927, 300 schools belonged to the PVIL.

In 1939 Yates High School (Houston) coach Andrew "Pat" Patterson asked the principal of Yates, William S. Holland, to meet with E. B. Evans, the president of Prairie View A&M, to discuss regulating American football and establishing a football league. Rick Sherrod, author of Texas High School Football Dynasties, described Patterson as the "architect" of the PVIL football league.

Initially only schools in urban areas were a part of the football league. Originally there were 21 schools, but the membership expanded to the point where schools needed to be divided into conferences based on their sizes. The league was divided into 1A and 2A conferences by 1948. Conferences 3A and 4A were established by 1952 and in 1960, respectively.

In 1964, discussions began on the possibility of UIL admission for black Texas high schools. The PVIL began to merge with the UIL, and schools in urban areas played their last PVIL football seasons in 1966. All sports competition transitioned to the UIL by the spring of 1970 and the organization disbanded that year.

The Prairie View Interscholastic League Coaches Association (PVILCA), an organization for former PVIL coaches and athletes, was later formed to preserve the league's history and to honor its participants. League memorabilia is displayed at a community center run by The University of Texas.

== Houston Chronicle All-Time PVIL Football Team ==
The Houston Chronicle named a team of all-time PVIL football players in a 1992 list.

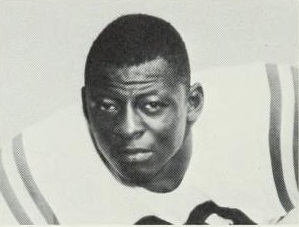
Mel Farr, PVIL athlete and NFL All-Pro

- Charley Taylor, Dalworth High School (Grand Prairie), wide receiver^{†}
- Warren Wells, Beaumont Hebert High School, wide receiver
- Cliff Branch, Houston Worthing High School, wide receiver
- Jerry LeVias, Beaumont Hebert High School, end
- Gene Upshaw, Robstown High School, offensive lineman^{†}
- Marvin Upshaw, Robstown High School, offensive lineman
- Ernie Ladd, Orange High School, offensive lineman
- Clarence Williams, Sweeny Carver High School, offensive lineman
- Otis Taylor, Houston Worthing High School, quarterback
- Gene Washington, Baytown Carver High School, running back
- Duane Thomas, Lincoln High School (Dallas), running back
- Tody Smith, Beaumont Charlton-Pollard High School, defensive lineman
- Bubba Smith, Beaumont Charlton-Pollard High School, defensive lineman
- Joe Greene, Temple Dunbar High School, defensive lineman^{†}
- Harvey Martin, South Oak Cliff High School (Dallas), defensive lineman
- Dick Lane, Austin Anderson High School, linebacker^{†}
- Tony Guillory, Beaumont Hebert High School, linebacker
- Emmitt Thomas, Angleton High School, linebacker^{†}
- Mel Farr, Beaumont Hebert High School, defensive back
- Miller Farr, Beaumont Hebert High School, defensive back
- Ken Houston, Lufkin Dunbar High School, defensive back^{†}
- Abner Haynes, Dallas Lincoln High School, defensive back

^{†} Inducted into Pro Football Hall of Fame
