= Alexander Durley (high school coach) =

American football coach (1937–1984)

Alexander Trancil Durley (February 3, 1937 – April 30, 1984) was an American football coach at high schools in Beaumont, Texas. His teams won two state championships.

Durley was born in Pittsburg, Texas. He served in the U.S. Army as a private. He worked as a football coach under Clifton Ozen at Hebert High School, the black high school in the South Park Independent School District in Beaumont, and then as part of a district faculty and staff desegregation effort was made head football coach at the almost all-white South Park High School. In 1975 he returned to Hebert as head football coach for seven years. In his second season, the Hebert Panthers won the Class 4A University Interscholastic League championship, the first black school to win a state UIL title. In his last three seasons, they amassed a 37–3 win-loss record; his overall record at Hebert was 76–7–2. In 1982 he was appointed the first head football coach at the integrated West Brook High School created out of the merger of Hebert with the also almost all-white Forest Park High School. In their first season, despite an unpromising start, the West Brook Bruins won the state 5A championship.

Durley died of lung cancer in Beaumont in 1984, at the age of 47. Alex Durley Stadium at West Brook was named for him. In 1988 he was inducted into the Texas High School Coaches Association Hall of Honor.
