= Hebert High School =

School in Beaumont, Texas, United States

Coordinates: 30.0516°N 94.1184°W

Hebert High School was a traditionally black high school in the South Park Independent School District in Beaumont, Texas, US. It was founded in the early 20th century to serve the black community, and became an accredited high school in 1923. In response to a court desegregation order, it was merged with Forest Park High School in 1982 to form West Brook High School, with the Hebert campus originally housing the ninth and tenth grades. The campus later became the site of Ozen Senior High School, and following a merger with Central High School, of Beaumont United High School.

== History ==
Hebert High School developed out of a school for black children of all ages built in the early 20th century on two acres of land in the Pear Orchard section of Beaumont that was donated to the South Park Independent School District by two former slaves, Usan Hebert and Ozan Blanchette. It was initially called South Park Colored School but was renamed for Hebert at the instigation of the first principal, John P. Odom, and a group of supporters. The original two-room wooden school was replaced in 1922 by a two-story brick building with a vocational annex, and in 1923 it was accredited as a high school. The first class of five graduated in 1924. The campus continued to expand, with major additions in the 1930s and 1940s including the addition of another acre of land, and in 1941–1942 Hebert was accredited as a four-year high school, with the first twelfth-graders graduating in 1942. In 1954 the school relocated to a new campus on Fannett Road; it became exclusively a senior high school in 1968 when Odom Middle School moved to a separate site.

Hebert remained a black school. In the 1970s, in response to court rulings calling for desegregation, the principal, James Jackson, and many of the teachers were reassigned elsewhere. In 1982, on the orders of a judge, the school was merged with the almost entirely white Forest Park High School to form an integrated high school, West Brook. The Hebert campus housed the ninth and tenth grades, the Forest Park campus, the eleventh and twelfth. At the time of the merger, Hebert students were scoring noticeably below students at Forest Park and South Park High School, the district's other mostly white high school, especially in reading; the district as a whole was below the national average.

In 1998 the renovated campus became the site of the new Ozen Senior High School, which students voted to name for Clifford Ozen, head football coach at Hebert from 1959 to 1974. Also by student vote, Ozen's teams became the panthers and its colors blue and gold, as at Hebert. In 2017, Hurricane Harvey caused extensive damage to Central High School, and in fall 2018 the Ozen campus became the site of a merged Beaumont United High School.

== Athletics ==
Hebert was known for football. Its big rival was Charlton-Pollard High School, the traditionally black high school of the crosstown Beaumont Independent School District; the annual game between the two was known as the "Soul Bowl" and was characterized in 1983 by Ozen as "our Super Bowl". It attracted scouts from numerous out-of-state colleges.

The football team won the Prairie View Interscholastic League championship for black schools twice, in 1959 and 1966. After the integration of the University Interscholastic League, it won the Class 3A state championship in 1976, its second year under Ozen's successor as head coach, Alexander Durley, who became the first head football coach at West Brook after the merger. It was the first black school to win a UIL state title.

== Notable alumni ==
- Jerry Ball, former NFL football player; attended West Brook after consolidation
- Vance Bedford, coach and for NFL & USFL football player
- Darrell Colbert, former NFL football player; attended West Brook after consolidation
- Mel Farr, former NFL football player
- Miller Farr, former NFL football player
- Anthony Guillory, former NFL football player
- Jerry LeVias, former NFL football player
- Barbara Lynn, musician and singer/songwriter
- Bob Pollard, former NFL football player
- Warren Wells, former NFL football player
