= List of Lamar Cardinals in the NFL draft =

This is a list of Lamar Cardinals football players in the NFL draft.

== Key ==
B	Back	K	Kicker	NT	Nose tackle
C	Center	LB	Linebacker	FB	Fullback
DB	Defensive back	P	Punter	HB	Halfback
DE	Defensive end	QB	Quarterback	WR	Wide receiver
DT	Defensive tackle	RB	Running back	G	Guard
E	End	T	Offensive tackle	TE	Tight end

== Selections ==
Year	Round	Pick	Overall	Player	Team	Position
1957	21	10	251	Dudley Meredith	Detroit Lions	DT
1957	25	7	296	Ray Meyer	San Francisco 49ers	B
1957	30	6	355	George Parks	San Francisco 49ers	B
1960	20	10	238	Jim Woodward	San Francisco 49ers	T
1962	19	7	151	Bobby Jancik	Houston Oilers	DB
1965	7	9	93	Anthony Guillory	Los Angeles Rams	LB
1966	13	2	187	Jake David	Los Angeles Rams	RB
1967	11	16	279	Ed Marcontell	St. Louis Cardinals	G
1967	15	26	393	Darrel Johnson	New Orleans Saints	RB
1968	2	28	55	Tom Smiley	Cincinnati Bengals	RB
1968	4	15	98	Johnny Fuller	San Francisco 49ers	DB
1972	9	14	222	Pat Gibbs	Philadelphia Eagles	DB
1972	14	5	343	Gary Crockett	Houston Oilers	DT
1973	5	13	117	Charles Cantrell	Washington Redskins	T
1973	13	5	317	Ed Robinson	St. Louis Cardinals	DB
1973	15	12	376	Thomas Gage	Atlanta Falcons	DB
1975	17	2	418	Rondy Colbert	New York Giants	DB
1978	12	10	321	Jeff Bergeron	Seattle Seahawks	RB
1978	12	15	321	Kevin Bell	San Diego Chargers	WR
1981	11	7	281	Johnny Ray Smith	Tampa Bay Buccaneers	DB
1985	6	23	163	Danzell Lee	Washington Redskins	TE
1990	6	5	142	Tyrone Shavers	Phoenix Cardinals	WR
2017	3	37	101	Brendan Langley	Denver Broncos	DB

== Notable undrafted players ==
Note: No drafts held before 1920

Debut year	Player name	Position	Debut NFL/AFL team	Notes
1984	Kevin McArthur	LB	Los Angeles Raiders	
1986	Billy Bell	DB	Houston Oilers	
1987	Eugene Seale	LB	Houston Oilers	
1990	Chris Ford	WR	Tampa Bay Buccaneers	
2015	Joe Okafor	NT	Pittsburgh Steelers	
