= Beaumont High School (Beaumont, Texas) =

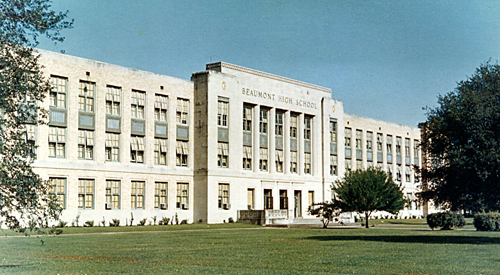
- Front of Beaumont High School, in 1967

Location
- Beaumont, Texas; United States; 30.0808°N 94.1264°W

Information
- Type: Former public secondary school
- Opened: 1898
- Closed: 1975
- School district: Beaumont Independent School District

Beaumont High School was a public, co-educational secondary school in the Beaumont Independent School District in Beaumont, Texas from 1898 to 1975.

== History ==
In 1884, two buildings were used by the district for schools: the Old Fireman Hall and the Negro Odd Fellows Hall. Beginning in 1898 a superintendent was hired, new school buildings were constructed and funds were budgeted for their maintenance.

Beaumont High School graduated a class of three on June 1, 1900, in a ceremony at the Kyle Opera House. Ida Lillian Pittman was valedictorian; Ludlow Calhoun, class salutatorian; and Harry Potter Jirou, class essayist. The title of Miss Pittman's valedictory address was "Some Women of History."

The cornerstone for the first building used primarily for high school students was laid on January 11, 1904 at College and Neches streets. During its first year of use, the building housed students in grades 5-12. A lack of funds forced the third floor to be left unfinished. The location caused some concern among parents on the north side of the city, because their children had to walk through "one of the vilest sections of the Tenderloin district, known here as the 'Reservation.'"

In 1925, a $40,000 gymnasium and auditorium were added to the College Street building.

On April 8, 1928, voters approved a $1.5 million bond issue, including $900,000 for the construction of a new high school at the built in classic Greek style at end of Pecos Boulevard in what was then city's far-west end. In April 1930, the high school's 1,000 students moved into the new, three-story facility. It was planned by Steinman and Steinman Architects of Beaumont. One of the partners, Douglas E. Steinman, was a 1913 BHS graduate. The new building included a modern innovation for the time, a loudspeaker system that linked the principal's office to all rooms on campus.

In 1975, as part of court-ordered desegregation of the district, Beaumont High School was merged with the formerly all-black Charlton-Pollard High School to form Beaumont Charlton-Pollard High School. This school was later merged with French High School and renamed Beaumont Central.

The Beaumont Independent School District voted in January 2018 to close the 1930 building, which was then housing Central High School, after it was damaged by Hurricane Harvey in September 2017.

== Athletics ==
- 1911: won state track and field meet
- 1912: won state track and field meet
- 1925: competed in the state basketball championship defeating San Antonio Brackenridge
- 1931: competed in the state football championship losing to Abilene High School
- 1959: won Class 4A state baseball championship

== Notable alumni ==
- Roy Ames, 1955 – record producer and convicted sex offender
- Harry Brinkley "Brink" Bass, 1932 – received the Navy Cross and Silver Star during WWII
- John Barnes Chance, 1951 – music composer
- Carr P. Collins – business magnate, co-founded Fidelity Life Insurance Co.
- Wilfred Roy Cousins, Jr. – member of the Texas Senate
- Mildred "Babe" Didrikson, 1930 – Olympic athlete and golfer
- Dwight Harrison, 1967 – NFL cornerback and wide receiver
- Grady Hatton, 1939 – professional baseball player and coach/manager.
- Harry James – trumpet player and band leader who played in the Beaumont High School band while still in junior high
- John Holmes Jenkins, 1958 – Texas historian and author
- Alan J. Magill, 1972 – leader of Gates Foundation program to eradicate malaria until death in 2015
- Jiles Perry Richardson, 1947 – rock musician, best known as "The Big Bopper"—he sang in the school choir as well as played on the football team.
- James M. "Jimmy" Simmons, 1960 – former president of Lamar University and music educator
- John Tower, 1942 – U.S. Senator
- Edgar Winter, 1966 – musician
- Johnny Winter, 1962 – rock musician
- Gus Zernial, 1940 – professional baseball player
