= Temple High School (Texas) =

Location
- 415 North 31st Street; Temple, Bell County, Texas 76504-2498; United States; 31.10698°N 97.35347°W

Information
- School type: Public, high school
- Established: 1883
- Locale: City: Small
- School district: Temple ISD
- NCES School ID: 484233004827
- Principal: Jason Mayo
- Staff: 179.36 (on an FTE basis)
- Grades: 9–12
- Enrollment: 2,342 (2023–2024)
- Student to teacher ratio: 13.06
- Colors: Royal Blue; White
- Athletics conference: UIL Class AAAAAA
- Mascot: Wildcat
- Newspaper: Catalyst
- Yearbook: Cotton Blossom
- Website: Temple High School

Temple High School is a public high school located in Temple, Texas. As of the 2024–2026 biennial realignment, it is classified as a 6A school by the University Interscholastic League. It is part of the Temple Independent School District located in central Bell County. During 2022–2023, Temple High School had an enrollment of 2,305 students and a student to teacher ratio of 12.56. The school received an overall rating of "A" from the Texas Education Agency for the 2025–2026 school year.

== History of racial segregation in Temple education system ==
The "Temple Colored School" was established in 1885, and in 1912 a two-story building was erected with eleven classrooms, a science lab, and a principal's office. The first high school was organized in 1915, and in 1925 was renamed Dunbar High School. In 1952, the Dunbar High School campus was opened and served as a high school until 1968, when mandatory desegregation was implemented and the school was merged with Temple High School. The former Dunbar High School campus was renamed to Meridith Junior High in memory of G. C. Meridith who served as principal for more than 2 decades, and in 1970 Meridith-Dunbar became an elementary school.

In a 2014 article from the Killeen Daily Herald, a former Dunbar High School student recalled the inequalities that existed in resources between the two schools. She remembered receiving second-hand textbooks from Temple High School and being shocked by how black senators were depicted in the social studies books. “The sad thing is that our teachers, who were very capable, were not picked up by the system," she remarked about the transition to desegregation.

The Dunbar Panthers football team was coached by Curtis B. Elliott, and they won the state championship in 1939. Coach Elliott coached at Dunbar High School for 36 years.

== Academics ==
Temple High School became an International Baccalaureate authorized school in 1992 and is currently one of 46 IB authorized high schools in Texas. To date, Temple High School has awarded over 100 IB diplomas.

== Arts ==
The Temple High School theater department is a program with a 30-year streak as district UIL One-Act Play champions. The department has advanced to the UIL 5A State One-Act Play competition 7 times, winning in 2007 and 2016.

== Athletics ==
The 11,500-capacity Wildcat Stadium is the main stadium. The Temple Wildcats compete in the following sports:

- Baseball
- Basketball
- Cross country
- Football
- Golf
- Powerlifting
- Soccer
- Softball
- Swimming
- Tennis
- Track and field
- Volleyball
- Marching band

=== State titles ===
Temple (UIL)

- Football
  - 1979 (4A), 1992 (5A/D2)
- Boys' basketball
  - 1932 (All)
- One-act play
  - 2007 (5A), 2016 (5A)

Temple Dunbar (PVIL)

- Boys' basketball
  - 1958 (PVIL-3A)
- Boys' track
  - 1953 (PVIL-2A)

=== Football history ===
The Temple Wildcats have a history in football. As of the end of the 2017 football season, the school is ranked fourth behind Highland Park, Amarillo, and Plano in the state of Texas for total games won with 753.

State Championships (2): 1979 (4A), 1992 (5A Div. 2)

State Championship Game Appearances (9): 1940 (2A), 1941 (2A), 1951 (3A), 1952 (3A), 1976 (4A), 1979 (4A), 1992 (5A Div. 2), 2014 (5A Div. 1), 2016 (5A Div. 1)

Additional Football Statistics

- State Quarterfinalists (10)
- Regional Champions (13)
- Area Champions (13)
- Bi-District Champions (23)
- District Champions (34)
- Playoff appearances (41)

== Notable alumni ==
- Ki Aldrich, first pick of the 1939 NFL draft, NFL center for the Chicago Cardinals and Washington Redskins
- Jonathan Bane, football player
- Bryan Burrough, American author and journalist
- Daniel Lee Corwin, American serial killer executed in 1998
- Britt Daniel, co-founder, lead singer and guitarist of the alt-rock band Spoon
- Kenneth Davis, NFL running back for the Buffalo Bills
- Bobby Dillon, Hall of Fame NFL safety
- Danny Dunn, a mayor of Temple, Texas
- Brad Dusek, NFL linebacker for the Washington Redskins
- Brian Floca, American writer and illustrator of children's books, Caldecott Medal Award winner
- Ta'Quon Graham, NFL defensive end for the Atlanta Falcons
- Rufus Granderson, AFL defensive tackle for the Dallas Texans
- Tre Hawkins, NFL cornerback for the Minnesota Vikings
- Quentin Johnston, NFL wide receiver for the Los Angeles Chargers
- George Koch, American football player
- Dan Pope, 35th mayor of Lubbock (2016–2022)
- Dan Remsberg, former NFL tackle
- Mack Saxon, former UTEP football coach
- Lache Seastrunk, former NFL running back
- Brian Skinner, former NBA player (1998-2012)
- Jared Wiley, NFL tight end for the Kansas City Chiefs
- Taurean York, college football linebacker for the Texas A&M Aggies
- Tevin Reese, NFL former NFL Wide Receiver
