= Kevin Bell =

Kevin Bell may refer to:

- Kevin Bell (judge) (born 1954), Australian judge
- Kevin Bell (American football) (1955–2023), former National Football League player
- Kevin Bell (baseball) (born 1955), former Major League Baseball player
- DJ Head (Kevin Bell, born 1971), American hip-hop producer and DJ
