= South Park High School =

South Park High School may refer to:

- South Park High School (Colorado)
- South Park High School (Buffalo, New York)
- South Park High School (South Park, Pennsylvania)
- South Park High School (Beaumont, Texas)
