= Mike Farr =

American football player (born 1967)

No. 81
- Position: Wide receiver

Personal information
- Born: August 8, 1967 (age 59); Santa Monica, California, U.S.
- Listed height: 5 ft 10 in (1.78 m)
- Listed weight: 192 lb (87 kg)

Career information
- College: UCLA
- NFL draft: 1990: undrafted

Career history
- Detroit Lions (1990–1992); New England Patriots (1993)

Career NFL statistics
- Receptions: 69
- Yards: 716
- Touchdowns: 1
- Stats at Pro Football Reference

Michael Anthony Farr (born August 8, 1967) is an American former professional football player who was a wide receiver for four seasons in the National Football League (NFL), three with the Detroit Lions and one with the New England Patriots. He played college football for the UCLA Bruins.

== College career ==
Farr attended the University of California, Los Angeles, where he was an academic and athletic star graduating with honors in four years while breaking the Bruins record for receptions in a single season.

== Family life ==
Farr is part of a family full of professional football players. Farr is the son of former NFL player Mel Farr, the nephew of former AFL and NFL player Miller Farr, and the younger brother of former NFL player Mel Farr, Jr. Farr and his brother are members of Alpha Phi Alpha fraternity.

The Farr lineage is not just success in football, but has become synonymous with cars. Mel Farr, Sr. became a successful auto dealer after finishing his career with the Detroit Lions. In 2002, Mike Farr started Second Chance Motors to address the inconsistencies in financing subprime customers in the used vehicle segment of the market place. On January 8, 2013, the U.S. Securities and Exchange Commission agreed to settle its claims against Farr, who allegedly helped investment adviser Roy Dixon Jr. and his private equity firm steal $3.1 million from three Michigan pension funds.
