= Vance Bedford =

American football player and coach (born 1958)

Biographical details
- Born: August 20, 1958 (age 68); Beaumont, Texas, U.S.

Playing career
- 1977–1981: Texas
- 1982: St. Louis Cardinals
- 1984: San Antonio Gunslingers
- 1984: Oklahoma Outlaws
- Position: Cornerback

Coaching career (HC unless noted)
- 1985: Forest Brook (TX) HS (assistant)
- 1986: Navarro (assistant)
- 1987–1992: Colorado State (DB)
- 1993–1994: Oklahoma State (DB)
- 1995–1998: Michigan (DB)
- 1999–2004: Chicago Bears (DB)
- 2005–2006: Oklahoma State (DC)
- 2007: Michigan (DB)
- 2008–2009: Florida (DB)
- 2010–2013: Louisville (DC)
- 2014–2016: Texas (DC)

Vance Juano Bedford (born August 20, 1958) is an American football coach who last served as defensive coordinator at the University of Texas at Austin for head coach Charlie Strong. He is also a former professional player, with one season each at cornerback in the NFL and USFL.

== Early life ==
Bedford was born in Beaumont, Texas. He played high-school football at Hebert High School, where his father, Leon Bedford, was coach and he was an all-District player for the first all-black high school in Texas to win a University Interscholastic League state title.

== College playing career ==
Bedford played college football at the University of Texas at Austin where he was a four-year letterman and starter at cornerback as well as the defensive captain. He was a two-time All-Southwest Conference second team selection. He played in two Cotton Bowls and two Sun Bowls. He set a then-Longhorn season record for pass breakups with 22 in 1981 and is currently in the top ten on UT's career pass breakup list (47). At the end of his senior year, he was named a Defensive Valuable Player in the 1982 Senior Bowl All-Star Game. He returned to Texas to receive his diploma in 1984.

== Professional playing career ==
Bedford was selected in the fifth round of the 1982 NFL draft by the St. Louis Cardinals. He played one season for the Cardinals, spending most of it on the injured reserve list with a knee injury and was active for just two regular season games and one playoff game and recorded no stats. After sitting out the 1983 season, he moved to the United States Football League (USFL), where he played one game each for the San Antonio Gunslingers and the Oklahoma Outlaws, again missing games with injuries. At the end of 1984 he was drafted by the Arizona Outlaws in the allocation draft, but never played for them.

== Coaching career ==
Before Texas, Bedford was the defensive coordinator at the University of Louisville, where he also served under head coach Charlie Strong. Before Louisville he had stints as the defensive back coach at the University of Florida under Urban Meyer, and at the University of Michigan under Lloyd Carr. He also coached the same position for six seasons with the Chicago Bears, and was the defensive coordinator at Oklahoma State University–Stillwater for two seasons.
