= Darrell Colbert =

American football player (born 1964)

No. 81, 76, 88
- Position: Wide receiver

Personal information
- Born: November 16, 1964 (age 61); Beaumont, Texas, U.S.
- Listed height: 5 ft 10 in (1.78 m)
- Listed weight: 174 lb (79 kg)

Career information
- High school: Hebert (Beaumont, Texas); West Brook (Beaumont, Texas)
- College: Texas Southern
- NFL draft: 1987: undrafted

Career history
- Kansas City Chiefs (1987–1988); New Orleans Saints (1989)*; Edmonton Eskimos (1990); BC Lions (1990); San Antonio Riders (1992); San Diego Chargers (1992)*; Edmonton Eskimos (1992)
- * Offseason or practice squad member only

Career NFL statistics
- Receptions: 4
- Receiving yards: 18
- Return yards: 29
- Stats at Pro Football Reference

Darrell Ray Colbert (born November 16, 1964) is an American former professional football player who was a wide receiver in the National Football League (NFL) and the World League of American Football (WLAF). He played for the Kansas City Chiefs of the NFL, and the San Antonio Riders of the WLAF.

Colbert was born in Beaumont, Texas, and attended the black Hebert High School and then West Brook Senior High School after Hebert was merged into it. He played college football at Texas Southern University.
