= Frank Middleton =

American football player (born 1974)

No. 73
- Position: Guard

Personal information
- Born: October 25, 1974 (age 52); Beaumont, Texas, U.S.
- Listed height: 6 ft 3 in (1.91 m)
- Listed weight: 330 lb (150 kg)

Career information
- High school: West Brook (Beaumont)
- College: Arizona
- NFL draft: 1997: 3rd round, 63rd overall pick

Career history
- Tampa Bay Buccaneers (1997–2000); Oakland Raiders (2001–2004); Miami Dolphins (2005)

Awards and highlights
- Second-team All-Pac-10 (1996)

Career NFL statistics
- Games played: 109
- Games started: 92
- Fumble recoveries: 2
- Stats at Pro Football Reference

Frank Middleton Jr. (born October 25, 1974) is an American former professional football player who was an offensive guard for eight seasons in the National Football League (NFL) during the 1990s and early 2000s. Middleton played college football for the Arizona Wildcats. He was selected in the third round of the 1997 NFL draft with the 63rd overall pick, and played professionally for the Tampa Bay Buccaneers and Oakland Raiders.

== Early life ==
Middleton was born in Beaumont, Texas ad graduated from West Brook Senior High School, where he was an All-American, All-State and all-conference prep star as a two-way lineman. He lettered three times in football and was on Texas Football's Top-50 List.

== College career ==
Middleton started playing college ball at Fort Scott Community College in Kansas. He was inducted into the Fort Scott Community College Athletic Hall of Fame in 2007.

After finishing two seasons at FSJC and earning Junior College All-America honors as a sophomore, Middleton transferred to the University of Arizona. He started in 18 games at left guard over two seasons at Arizona. In 1996, he started 10 games and was credited with 74 knockdown blocks. He majored in criminal justice.

== Professional career ==
The Tampa Bay Buccaneers chose Middleton in the third round (63rd pick overall) of the 1997 NFL Draft, and he played for the Buccaneers for four seasons from 1997 to 2000. He then joined the Oakland Raiders organization where he played for four more seasons.

== Life after the NFL ==
Middleton was the assistant coach at Kelly High School for seven years before becoming the offensive coordinator at Kountze High School in 2012. In 2013, he returned to Kelly High School as offensive coordinator.

Middleton and his wife live in Beaumont, Texas and have three daughters.
