= Beaumont Charlton-Pollard High School =

School in Beaumont, Texas, United States

Beaumont Charlton-Pollard High School was a senior high school in Beaumont, Texas, a part of the Beaumont Independent School District, that operated from 1975 to 1986. The mascot was the cougar; its school colors were green and gold.

It was established from the merger of Beaumont High School, the high school for white students, and Charlton-Pollard High School, the high school for black students. The merger happened after Joe J. Fisher, a U.S. federal district court judge, ordered Beaumont ISD to desegregate speedily. In 1986, the school consolidated with French High School to form Beaumont Central High School.

== Notable alumni ==
- Herman Fontenot – former NFL running back
- Reggie McElroy – former NFL offensive tackle
- Michael Sinclair – former NFL defensive end
