= Johnny Fuller (American football) =

American football player (born 1946)

No. 30, 23, 24
- Position: Safety

Personal information
- Born: March 3, 1946 (age 80); Beaumont, Texas, U.S.
- Listed height: 6 ft 0 in (1.83 m)
- Listed weight: 186 lb (84 kg)

Career information
- High school: South Park (Beaumont)
- College: Lamar
- NFL draft: 1968: 4th round, 98th overall pick

Career history
- San Francisco 49ers (1968–1972); New Orleans Saints (1973–1975)

Career NFL statistics
- Interceptions: 8
- Fumble recoveries: 8
- Sacks: 2
- Stats at Pro Football Reference

John Charles Fuller (born March 3, 1946) is an American former professional football player who was a safety for played eight seasons in the National Football League (NFL) with the San Francisco 49ers, New Orleans Saints and Chicago Bears.

Playing college football for the Lamar Cardinals, Fuller made all-conference three years and as a senior was named a small college all-American. He also lettered in track four years and was a qualifier in the decathlon for the 1968 U. S. Olympic trials.

Fuller was an assistant coach at Lamar University for six years, leaving there in 1986. In 1992, he became head football coach at Mendocino College.

Fuller and his wife, Sharon, have two sons.
