= Jerry Ball =

American football player (born 1964)

No. 93, 96
- Position: Defensive tackle

Personal information
- Born: December 15, 1964 (age 61); Beaumont, Texas, U.S.
- Listed height: 6 ft 1 in (1.85 m)
- Listed weight: 330 lb (150 kg)

Career information
- High school: Hebert (Beaumont); West Brook (Beaumont)
- College: SMU
- NFL draft: 1987: 3rd round, 63rd overall pick

Career history
- Detroit Lions (1987–1992); Cleveland Browns (1993); Los Angeles / Oakland Raiders (1994–1996); Minnesota Vikings (1997–1998); Cleveland Browns (1999); Minnesota Vikings (1999)

Awards and highlights
- First-team All-Pro (1991); 3× Pro Bowl (1989–1991); PFWA All-Rookie Team (1987); Second-team All-American (1986); Third-team All-American (1985); 2× First-team All-SWC (1984, 1986)

Career NFL statistics
- Tackles: 557
- Sacks: 32.5
- Interceptions: 1
- Stats at Pro Football Reference

Jerry Lee Ball Jr. (born December 15, 1964) is an American former professional football player who was a defensive lineman in the National Football League (NFL), playing primarily as a nose tackle. He played college football for the SMU Mustangs. Ball played in the NFL for the Detroit Lions, Cleveland Browns, Los Angeles / Oakland Raiders, and Minnesota Vikings.

== Biography ==
Ball was born in Beaumont, Texas, and attended Hebert High School, then after integration graduated from West Brook High School, where he played fullback and rushed for 1,000 yards and LB for 1982 5A State Championship All State honors. He was All District in three positions and was selected to play in the Texas high school all star game. Ball was selected as one of the top 100 players over the last 100 years by Dave Campbell's Texas Football and Texas UIL football organizations 1920 to 2020.

Ball was selected as a Texas Gridiron Legend in 2020 for contributions to the game of football.

He played college football at Southern Methodist University in University Park, Texas. He was a four-year letter-winner and ranks 4th on the all-time sack list at SMU. He was selected as All-Southwest Conference 84–86.

Ball was a third-team All-American as a junior and a second-team All-American as a senior. He was a two-time Outland and Lombardi award finalist, and a Christian-Terrell 3-time winner. Ball was inducted to SMU athletics Hall of Fame in 2015.

== Professional career ==
Pre-draft measurables
Height	Weight	Arm length	Hand span	40-yard dash	10-yard split	20-yard split	20-yard shuttle	Vertical jump	Broad jump	Bench press
6 ft 0 1/8 in (1.83 m)	292 lb (132 kg)	31 1/4 in (0.79 m)	9 in (0.23 m)	5.14 s	1.78 s	2.97 s	4.77 s	24.0 in (0.61 m)	8 ft 0 in (2.44 m)	23 reps
All values from NFL Combine

Ball was drafted by the Detroit Lions in the 3rd round (63rd overall) of the 1987 NFL draft. During his career he went to three Pro Bowls with the Detroit Lions.

Ball played in the NFL for 13 seasons. He recorded 32.5 sacks during his career, most of them coming as a nose tackle with the Detroit Lions. Despite this fact, Ball spent his entire career being double teamed and often triple teamed by opposing teams. Ball's dominance was such a force that teams would realign their best players to help centers deal with the pressure Ball kept on the middle of the offense. Known mostly as a run stuffer later in his career, he has been considered one of the best nose tackles of this era. Anchoring the Minnesota Viking defense alongside John Randle, also a Pro Bowl defensive tackle, Ball re-emerged as a leader and dominant force on the Vikings 15–1 record setting team.

== NFL career statistics ==
Legend
**Bold**	Career high

=== Regular season ===
Year	Team	Games		Tackles				Interceptions				Fumbles			
Year	Team	GP	GS	Comb	Solo	Ast	Sck	Int	Yds	TD	Lng	FF	FR	Yds	TD
1987	DET	12	12	36	—	—	1.0	0	0	0	0	0	0	0	0
1988	DET	**16**	**16**	68	—	—	2.0	0	0	0	0	0	0	0	0
1989	DET	**16**	**16**	**73**	—	—	**9.0**	0	0	0	0	0	**3**	0	0
1990	DET	15	15	50	—	—	2.0	0	0	0	0	0	0	0	0
1991	DET	13	13	36	—	—	2.0	0	0	0	0	1	0	0	0
1992	DET	12	12	43	—	—	2.5	0	0	0	0	0	**3**	**21**	**1**
1993	CLE	**16**	7	46	—	—	3.0	0	0	0	0	**2**	0	0	0
1994	RAI	**16**	14	52	**44**	8	3.0	0	0	0	0	0	1	0	0
1995	OAK	15	14	41	33	8	3.0	0	0	0	0	1	1	0	0
1996	OAK	**16**	0	26	22	4	3.0	**1**	**66**	**1**	**66**	0	1	0	0
1997	MIN	12	6	30	17	**13**	0.0	0	0	0	0	0	2	0	0
1998	MIN	**16**	**16**	31	24	7	0.0	0	0	0	0	1	1	0	0
1999	MIN	13	10	24	16	8	1.0	0	0	0	0	0	0	0	0
1999	CLE	3	3	1	1	0	1.0	0	0	0	0	0	0	0	0
		191	154	557	157	48	32.5	1	66	1	66	5	12	21	1

=== Playoffs ===
Year	Team	Games		Tackles				Interceptions				Fumbles			
Year	Team	GP	GS	Comb	Solo	Ast	Sck	Int	Yds	TD	Lng	FF	FR	Yds	TD
1997	MIN	**2**	**2**	**6**	**3**	**3**	0.0	0	0	0	0	0	**1**	0	0
1998	MIN	**2**	**2**	3	2	1	0.0	0	0	0	0	0	0	0	0
1999	MIN	**2**	1	1	1	0	0.0	0	0	0	0	0	0	0	0
		6	5	10	6	4	0.0	0	0	0	0	0	1	0	0

== Personal life ==
Ball became a member of Omega Psi Phi fraternity at Southern Methodist University Spring 1984.

Ball has three daughters and four grandchildren.
