= C. L. Whittington =

American football player and coach (born 1952)

No. 38
- Position: Safety

Personal information
- Born: August 1, 1952 (age 74); Beaumont, Texas, U.S.
- Listed height: 6 ft 1 in (1.85 m)
- Listed weight: 200 lb (91 kg)

Career information
- High school: Charlton-Pollard
- College: Prairie View A&M
- NFL draft: 1974: undrafted

Career history

Playing
- Houston Oilers (1974–1978)

Coaching
- Frankfurt Galaxy (1995–1996) Defensive line; Houston Outlaws (1999) Linebackers; Houston Marshals (2000) Linebackers; Prairie View A&M (2003) Head coach

Head coaching record
- Career: 1–10
- Stats at Pro Football Reference

Columbus Lorenzo Whittington (born August 1, 1952) is an American former professional football player and coach. He played as a defensive back for the Houston Oilers of the National Football League (NFL).

Whittington served as the head football coach at Prairie View A&M University for one season in 2003, compiling a record of 1–10. Whittington played college football for the Prairie View A&M Panthers from 1970 to 1973 and then played in the NFL with the Oilers. After his playing career, he served as the head coach for Prairie View A&M for one season in 2003, compiling a record of 1–10. He became the defensive back coach at Hallsville High School.

== Early life ==
Whittington grew up in Beaumont, Texas, and attended Charlton-Pollard High School.

== Playing career ==
Whittington played at Prairie View A&M University from 1970 to 1973 under head coach each year of his college career: Alexander Durley in 1970, Jim Hillyer in 1971, Theophilus Danzy in 1972, and Cornelius Cooper in 1973. He later played for the Houston Oilers in the NFL as a defensive back from 1974 to 1978, playing in no less than 12 games each season.

== Coaching career ==
=== Prairie View A&M ===
Whittington was the 22nd head football coach at Prairie View A&M University in Prairie View, Texas and he held that position for the 2003 season. His record at Prairie View was 1–10.

== Head coaching record ==
Year	Team	Overall	Conference	Standing	Bowl/playoffs
Prairie View A&M Panthers (Southwestern Athletic Conference) (2003)
2003	Prairie View A&M	1–10	0–7	5th (West)	
Prairie View A&M:		1–10	0–7		
Total:		1–10			
