= Robert Pollard (American football) =

American football player (born 1981)

Profile
- Position: Defensive end

Personal information
- Born: June 28, 1981 (age 45); Metairie, Louisiana, U.S.

Career information
- College: TCU

Career history
- 2004: San Diego Chargers
- 2005–2006: Seattle Seahawks
- 2008: Dallas Desperados (AFL)
- Stats at Pro Football Reference

Robert Pollard (born June 28, 1981) is an American former professional football player who was a defensive end in the National Football League (NFL). Pollard played college football for the TCU Horned Frogs on a football scholarship and graduated Texas Christian University with a Bachelor of Science degree in psychology in 2003. Afterward, he signed with the San Diego Chargers as a free agent (2004), and later with the Seattle Seahawks (2005–2006) before injuring his knee, ending his NFL career. After spending 2007 recovering from the injury, Pollard signed with the Dallas Desparados of the Arena Football League and played for a year before the entire arena football league was put on hiatus the following year.

His father Bob Pollard played 154 games in the NFL as a defensive lineman. Pollard now works as a peace officer in Texas.
