= Donald Mitchell (American football) =

American football player (born 1976)

No. 30
- Position: Cornerback

Personal information
- Born: December 14, 1976 (age 49); Beaumont, Texas, U.S.
- Listed height: 5 ft 10 in (1.78 m)
- Listed weight: 182 lb (83 kg)

Career information
- High school: Beaumont Central
- College: SMU
- NFL draft: 1999: 4th round, 117th overall pick

Career history
- Tennessee Titans (1999–2002); Dallas Cowboys (2003)

Career NFL statistics
- Games played: 44
- Games started: 12
- Interceptions: 2
- Stats at Pro Football Reference

Donald Roosevelt Mitchell (born December 14, 1976) is an American former professional football player who was a cornerback in the National Football League (NFL) for the Tennessee Titans and Dallas Cowboys. He played college football for the SMU Mustangs.

== Early life ==
Mitchell attended Beaumont Central High School. He played cornerback and was an All-District selection as a senior. He also practiced track and baseball.

He accepted a football scholarship from Southern Methodist University. As a sophomore, he started 6 games at cornerback. As a junior, he became a regular starter at cornerback, collecting 45 tackles and 3 interceptions.

As a senior, he registered 74 tackles, 16 passes defensed, 3 interceptions and 2 forced fumbles. He had 13 tackles against the University of Mississippi. He finished his college career after starting 26 out of 41 games, while making 160 tackles, 6 interceptions, 2 fumble recoveries and 4 forced fumbles.

== Professional career ==
=== Tennessee Titans ===
Mitchell was selected by the Tennessee Titans in the fourth round (117th overall) of the 1999 NFL draft. As a rookie, he earned the position of nickel back and appeared in all 16 games, tallying 7 tackles, one pass defensed, 19 special teams tackles (fourth on the team), one blocked kick and one returned interception for a touchdown. The Titans would eventually make it to Super Bowl XXXIV, where they lost to the Kurt Warner-led St. Louis Rams.

In 2000, he suffered a torn right ACL during a practice and was placed on the injured reserve list on August 22. In 2001, he appeared in 12 contests, missing the final 4 games with a sprained right knee, while making 25 tackles, 4 passes defensed, 13 special teams tackles and one blocked kick.

In 2002, he started 9 games at right cornerback in place on an injured Samari Rolle and was able to play through ankle and knee injuries. He posted 51 tackles, one interception, 8 passes defensed, 2 quarterback pressures, 11 special teams tackles, 3 recovered fumbles and one forced fumble. In February 2003, he underwent arthroscopic surgery in one of his ankles. During his time with the Titans he was also a core special teams player.

=== Dallas Cowboys ===
On March 20, 2003, he was signed as a free agent by the Dallas Cowboys, with the intention of playing him at the nickel back position. He suffered a serious left high ankle sprain in the final preseason game against the Oakland Raiders and was placed on the injured reserve list on August 31. He was released on August 31, 2004.
