= Mel Farr Jr. =

American football player (born 1966)

No. 22, 34, 81
- Position: Running back

Personal information
- Born: August 12, 1966 (age 60); Santa Monica, California, U.S.
- Listed height: 6 ft 0 in (1.83 m)
- Listed weight: 222 lb (101 kg)

Career information
- High school: Brother Rice (Bloomfield Township, Michigan)
- College: UCLA
- NFL draft: 1988: 9th round, 248th overall pick

Career history
- Denver Broncos (1988)*; Los Angeles Rams (1989); Sacramento Surge (1991); Detroit Lions (1991)*
- * Offseason or practice squad member only

Career NFL statistics
- Games played: 1
- Stats at Pro Football Reference

Melvin Farr Jr. (born August 12, 1966) is an American former professional football player who was a running back for one season for the Los Angeles Rams of the National Football League (NFL). He attended and played college football for the UCLA Bruins. He was selected 248th overall by the Denver Broncos in the ninth round of the 1988 NFL draft.

Farr is part of a family full of professional football players. Farr is the son of former NFL player Mel Farr, the nephew of former American Football League (AFL) and NFL player Miller Farr, and the older brother of former NFL player Mike Farr.

Farr is a member of Alpha Phi Alpha fraternity.
