= Kevin Bell (American football) =

American football player (1955–2023)

No. 80
- Position: Wide receiver

Personal information
- Born: March 14, 1955; Beaumont, Texas, U.S.
- Died: February 11, 2023 (aged 67); Houston, Texas, U.S.
- Listed height: 5 ft 10 in (1.78 m)
- Listed weight: 180 lb (82 kg)

Career information
- High school: South Park (Beaumont)
- College: Lamar
- NFL draft: 1978: 12th round, 321st overall pick

Career history
- San Diego Chargers (1978)*; New York Jets (1978); Ottawa Rough Riders (1980)*
- * Offseason or practice squad member only

Awards and highlights
- First-team All-Southland (1977)
- Stats at Pro Football Reference

Kevin Abraham Bell (March 14, 1955 – February 11, 2023) was an American professional football player who was a wide receiver for one season with the New York Jets of the National Football League (NFL). He played college football for the Lamar Cardinals and was selected by the San Diego Chargers in the 12th round of the 1978 NFL draft.

== Early life and college ==
Kevin Abraham Bell was born on March 14, 1955, in Beaumont, Texas. He attended South Park High School in Beaumont.

Bell played college football for the Lamar Cardinals of Lamar University as a running back. He was a two-year letterman from 1976 to 1977. He rushed for 110 yards his junior year while averaging 18.6 yards per kickoff return. As a senior in 1977, he ran for a team-leading 515 yards and earned first-team All-Southland Conference honors. Bell was also a four-year letterman in track for Lamar from 1974 to 1977. He set a school record with a 10.3 second 100-meter dash in 1977. He was inducted into Lamar's Cardinal Hall of Honor in 2002.

== Professional career ==
Bell was selected by the San Diego Chargers in the 12th round, with the 321st overall pick, of the 1978 NFL draft. He was released by the Chargers on August 7, 1978.

Bell signed with the New York Jets on October 19, 1978. He played in nine games for the Jets in 1978, returning two kicks for 66 yards. He was released on August 21, 1979.

Bell signed with the Ottawa Rough Riders of the Canadian Football League in 1980 but was later released.

== Personal life ==
After his NFL career, Bell worked at plants for DuPont, Chemco and Gerdau before retiring in 2018. While working full-time, he returned to Lamar and earned an associate's degree in applied arts and science. He was also a substitute teacher for the Beaumont Independent School District for over ten years.

Bell died on February 11, 2023, at the MD Anderson Cancer Center in Houston, Texas.
