= Alan Magill =

Former President of the American Society of Tropical Medicine and Hygiene

Alan J. Magill
- Born: November 26, 1953; Craig, Colorado, United States
- Died: September 19, 2015 (aged 61); Woodway, Washington
- Occupations: Director of Malaria Programs at the Bill & Melinda Gates Foundation and President of the American Society of Tropical Medicine and Hygiene
- Spouse: Janiine Babcock
- Children: 2

Alan Jon Magill (November 26, 1953 – September 19, 2015) was the Director of Malaria Programs at the Bill & Melinda Gates Foundation and President of the American Society of Tropical Medicine and Hygiene.

== Life and career ==
Magill was born November 26, 1953, in Craig, Colorado. He graduated from Beaumont High School, Texas, and received his B.S. from Lamar University in 1976, his M.S. from the University of Rhode Island in 1978, and his M.D. from Baylor College of Medicine in 1984.

He held the Head of Parasitology position at the United States Navy's Medical Research Center in Peru from 1996 to 1999.

Magill worked as Program Manager at the Defense Advanced Research Projects Agency (DARPA) from 2009 to 2012 before joining the Bill & Melinda Gates Foundation in 2012, where he worked until his death in 2015. During his tenure at the Foundation, he worked to address health issues including malaria and Ebola.
