= Bob Pollard =

American football player (born 1948)

No. 82
- Position: Defensive end

Personal information
- Born: December 30, 1948 (age 77); Beaumont, Texas, U.S.
- Listed height: 6 ft 3 in (1.91 m)
- Listed weight: 250 lb (113 kg)

Career information
- High school: Hebert (Beaumont)
- College: Texas Southern (1966); Weber State (1967–1970)
- NFL draft: 1971: 11th round, 262nd overall pick

Career history
- New Orleans Saints (1971–1977); St. Louis Cardinals (1978–1981)

Awards and highlights
- New Orleans Saints Hall of Fame

Career NFL statistics
- Sacks: 57
- Fumble recoveries: 14
- Defensive touchdowns: 1
- Stats at Pro Football Reference

Robert Lee Pollard (born December 30, 1948) is an American former professional football player who was a defensive end for 11 seasons in the National Football League (NFL) with the New Orleans Saints—where he played four seasons as a defensive tackle—and the St. Louis Cardinals. He played college football for the Texas Southern Tigers and the Weber State Wildcats and was selected by the Saints in the eleventh round of the 1971 NFL draft.

== Early life ==
Pollard attended the black Hebert High School in Beaumont, Texas.

== College career ==
He began his college football career in 1966 with the Texas Southern Tigers, as he wanted to stay close to his family. After a year and a half, he decided to transfer to the Weber State Wildcats even though he had been a starter at Texas Southern because he felt that the school was trying to take his scholarship away in order to offer it to talented out of state players.

== Professional career ==
He was selected by the New Orleans Saints with the 262nd overall pick of the 1971 NFL draft. Pollard was named Saints defensive captain from 1976 to 1977 and was inducted into the New Orleans Saints Hall of Fame in 1995. In 1977, the Saints traded Pollard and guard Terry Stieve, to the St. Louis Cardinals for Pro Bowler guard Conrad Dobler and wide receiver Ike Harris. He finished his career with the Cardinals in 1981. Although quarterback sacks were not officially recorded prior to 1982, he has been credited with 57 unofficial sacks during his career.

== After football ==
In 1971, Pollard was one of sixteen pro football players from Beaumont to be given the Keys to The City.

== Personal life ==
His son, Robert, had a brief NFL career as a defensive end with the San Diego Chargers and the Seattle Seahawks.
