= Taylor Reed =

American gridiron football player (born 1991)

No. 44, 3, 35
- Position: Linebacker

Personal information
- Born: August 7, 1991 (age 35); Beaumont, Texas, U.S.
- Listed height: 5 ft 11 in (1.80 m)
- Listed weight: 235 lb (107 kg)

Career information
- High school: West Brook (Beaumont)
- College: Southern Methodist
- NFL draft: 2013: undrafted

Career history
- 2013: Dallas Cowboys*
- 2013: Winnipeg Blue Bombers*
- 2013: Dallas Cowboys*
- 2013–2014: New England Patriots*
- 2014–2015: Hamilton Tiger-Cats
- 2016: Calgary Stampeders
- 2016–2017: Ottawa Redblacks
- 2018: Toronto Argonauts
- 2018: Edmonton Eskimos
- 2020: Houston Roughnecks*
- * Offseason or practice squad member only

Awards and highlights
- Grey Cup champion (2016); 2× Second-team All-C-USA (2011, 2012)
- Stats at CFL.ca

Taylor Reed (born August 7, 1991) is an American former professional football linebacker who played in the Canadian Football League (CFL). He played college football at Southern Methodist University. He was a member of the Dallas Cowboys, Winnipeg Blue Bombers, New England Patriots, Hamilton Tiger-Cats, Calgary Stampeders, Ottawa Redblacks, Toronto Argonauts, Edmonton Eskimos, and Houston Roughnecks.

== Early life ==
Reed played high school football for the West Brook Senior High School Bruins of Beaumont, Texas and earned all-district honors.

== College career ==
Reed played in 52 games for the SMU Mustangs from 2009 to 2012, recording 400 total tackles. He was named second-team All-Conference USA in 2011 and 2012, honorable mention All-Conference USA in 2010 and All-Freshman Conference USA in 2009.

== Professional career ==
Pre-draft measurables
Height	Weight	40-yard dash	10-yard split	20-yard split	20-yard shuttle	Three-cone drill	Vertical jump	Broad jump	Bench press
5 ft 11 in (1.80 m)	240 lb (109 kg)	4.63 s	1.65 s	2.70 s	4.25 s	7.22 s	30 1/2 in (0.77 m)	9 ft 9 in (2.97 m)	29 reps
All values from SMU Pro Day

Reed was signed by the Dallas Cowboys of the National Football League (NFL) on May 10, 2013 after going undrafted in the 2013 NFL draft. He was released by the Cowboys on August 30, 2013.

On October 2, 2013, Reed was signed to the practice squad of the Winnipeg Blue Bombers of the CFL.

Reed was signed to the Cowboys practice squad on November 18, 2013. He was released by the Cowboys on November 26, 2013.

On December 30, 2013, Reed was signed to the practice squad of the New England Patriots of the NFL. He was signed to a futures contract by the Patriots on January 20, 2014. He was released by the Patriots on March 10, 2014.

Reed was signed by the Hamilton Tiger-Cats of the Canadian Football League on June 27, 2014. He was named Defensive Player of the Week for week twelve of the 2014 CFL season after recording six defensive tackles, one tackle for a loss, one special teams tackle and one quarterback sack. In two seasons with the Tiger-Cats Reed played in 33 games contributing 141 defensive tackles, 7 special teams tackles, 10 sacks, 3 forced fumbles and 2 interceptions.

As a free agent Reed signed with the Calgary Stampeders of the CFL on February 10, 2016. He was released by the Stampeders on September 12, 2016. Prior to being released he had played in all 10 games to start the 2016 season, contributing 41 tackles, 2 sacks and 1 forced fumble. The reason for his release was the exceptional play of national linebacker Alex Singleton.

Reed was signed by the Ottawa Redblacks of the CFL on September 13, 2016; only one day after being let go by Calgary. He played in all 8 of the remaining regular season games for Ottawa, and their two playoff games. During the 2016 season with Ottawa he accumulated 39 tackles and 1 quarterback sack. He set a career-high 12 tackles against Winnipeg on October 29. Reed helped lead Ottawa's defense to a championship in the 104th Grey Cup game versus his former team, the Calgary Stampeders, with a final score of 39-33 in overtime. On January 10, 2017 the Redblacks confirmed they had signed Taylor Reed to a one-year extension. Reed would have become a free agent on February 14, 2017. In his second season with the Redblacks Reed set a new career high with 94 tackles in 18 games: He also had four sacks. Following the season he was not re-signed by the Redblacks and became a free agent on February 13, 2018.

After being on the open market for a week Reed and the Toronto Argonauts agreed to a one-year contract on February 20, 2018. On August 15, 2018, Reed was released by the Argonauts.

Reed signed with the Edmonton Eskimos on September 24, 2018. He was released on May 3, 2019.

In October 2019, Reed was picked by the Houston Roughnecks in the open phase of the 2020 XFL draft.
