= Anthony Collins (American football) =

American football player (born 1985)

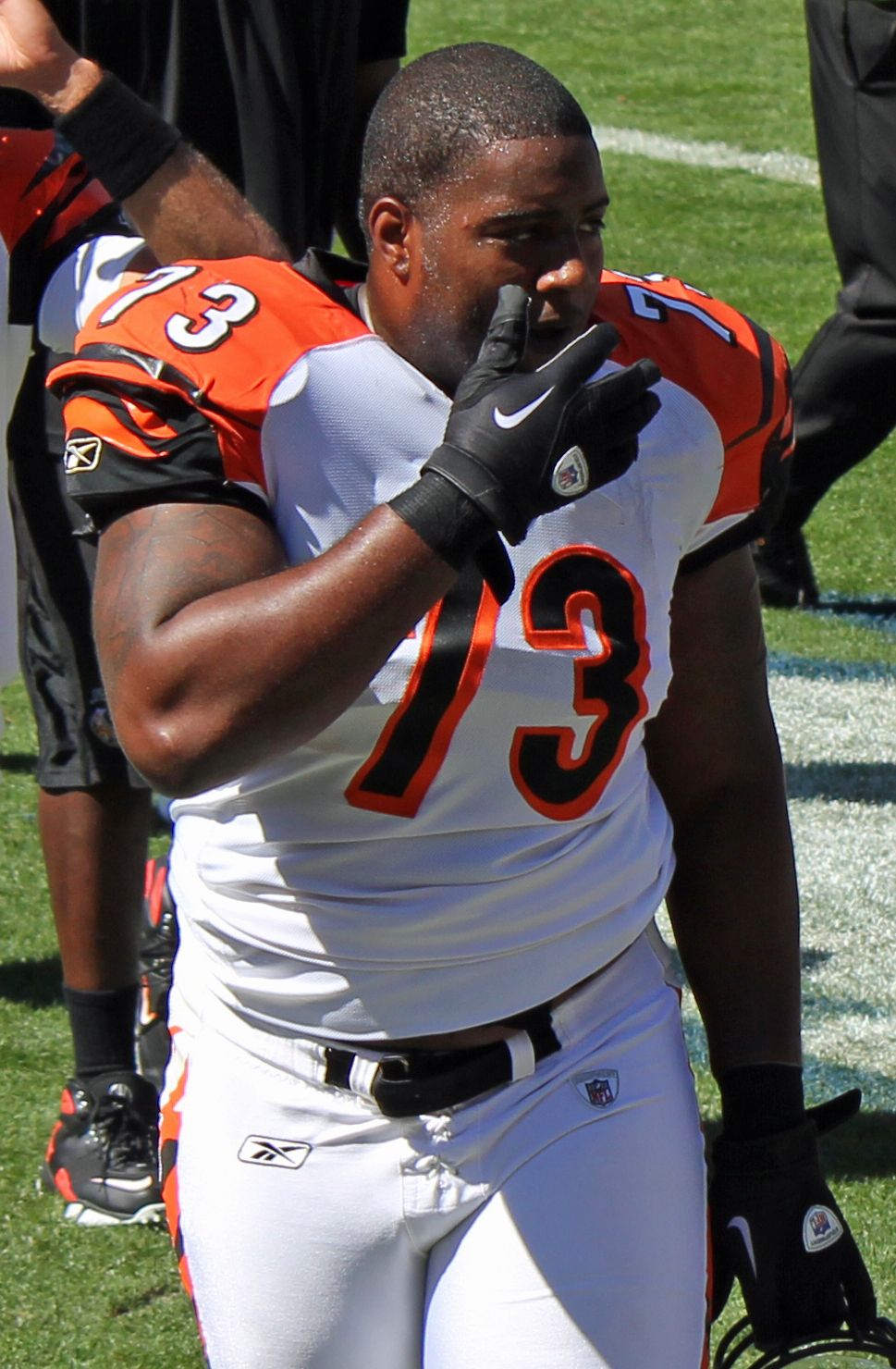
- Collins with the Cincinnati Bengals in 2011

No. 73
- Position: Tackle

Personal information
- Born: November 2, 1985 (age 41); Beaumont, Texas, U.S.
- Listed height: 6 ft 5 in (1.96 m)
- Listed weight: 315 lb (143 kg)

Career information
- High school: Central (Beaumont)
- College: Kansas
- NFL draft: 2008: 4th round, 112th overall pick

Career history
- Cincinnati Bengals (2008–2013); Tampa Bay Buccaneers (2014)

Awards and highlights
- First-team All-American (2007); First-team All-Big 12 (2007)

Career NFL statistics
- Games played: 69
- Games started: 35
- Stats at Pro Football Reference

Anthony Collins (born November 2, 1985) is an American former professional football player who was a tackle in the National Football League (NFL). He played college football for the Kansas Jayhawks and was a member of their 2008 Orange Bowl championship team. Collins was selected by the Cincinnati Bengals in the fourth round of the 2008 NFL draft. He also played for the Tampa Bay Buccaneers.

== Early life ==
Collins played high school football at Central High School in Beaumont, Texas.

== College career ==
Collins committed to the University of Kansas out of high school. He redshirted his freshman year. During the Jayhawks 2007 season, his redshirt junior year, he helped lead the Jayhawks to their first and only BCS Bowl victory in the 2008 Orange Bowl. Collins and teammate Aqib Talib were both named 1st team AP All-Americans that season.

Collins was added to the Ring of Honor during the Jayhawks 2017 season along with his teammate from the 2007 Orange Bowl Championship season, Aqib Talib.

== Professional career ==
=== Cincinnati Bengals ===
Collins played for the Cincinnati Bengals from 2008 to 2013, after being drafted in the fourth round with the 112th pick of the 2008 NFL draft. Most of his career was spent as a rotational player at left guard and left tackle. During his 2013 campaign, he had his strongest year, consistently performing well on the Bengals' offensive line as a left tackle.

=== Tampa Bay Buccaneers ===
On March 13, 2014, Collins signed a contract with the Tampa Bay Buccaneers. However, health concerns, multiple penalties and inconsistent play led to Collins being benched in favor of veteran right tackle Demar Dotson. He was considered more of a liability with his penalties and pedestrian play in the pass rush situations.

On March 2, 2015 it was announced that Tampa would try to trade Collins or release him, confirming that he would not be brought back for the 2015 season. On March 10, 2015, the team released Collins after failing to trade him before the official start of free agency.
