= Demar Dotson =

American football player (born 1985)

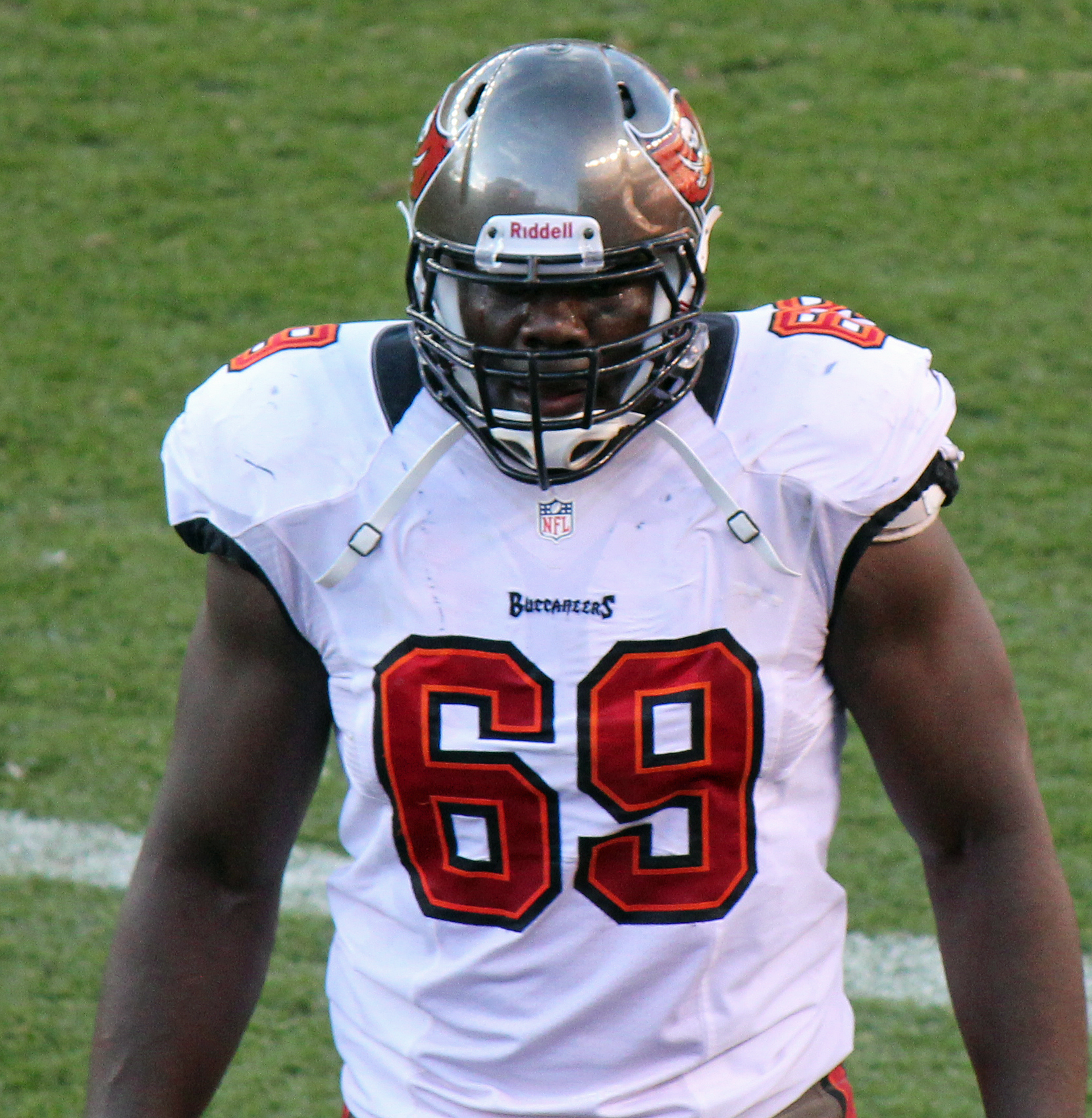
- Dotson with the Tampa Bay Buccaneers in 2012

No. 69, 78
- Position: Offensive tackle

Personal information
- Born: October 11, 1985 (age 41); Alexandria, Louisiana, U.S.
- Listed height: 6 ft 9 in (2.06 m)
- Listed weight: 315 lb (143 kg)

Career information
- High school: Alexandria
- College: Southern Mississippi
- NFL draft: 2009: undrafted

Career history
- Tampa Bay Buccaneers (2009–2019); Denver Broncos (2020)

Career NFL statistics
- Games played: 138
- Games started: 114
- Stats at Pro Football Reference

Demar Dotson (born October 11, 1985) is an American former professional football player who was an offensive tackle in the National Football League (NFL). He played college football for the Southern Mississippi Golden Eagles and was signed by the Tampa Bay Buccaneers as an undrafted free agent in 2009.

== Professional career ==
Pre-draft measurables
Height	Weight
6 ft 8 3/4 in (2.05 m)	306 lb (139 kg)
Values from Pro Day

=== Tampa Bay Buccaneers ===
Dotson signed with the Tampa Bay Buccaneers after going undrafted in the 2009 NFL draft.

In 2012, Dotson re-signed with the Buccaneers on a two-year deal. On September 18, Dotson won the starting right tackle job, beating Jeremy Trueblood. On March 28, 2013, Dotson signed a new four-year contract extension.

In 2013, he was expected to compete with Gabe Carimi, whom the Bucs traded for in June 2013, for the starting position at right tackle. In 2014, after starting 14 games as starting right tackle, Dotson moved to left tackle after poor performances from Anthony Collins.

In 2017, Dotson started 12 games at right tackle before being placed on injured reserve on November 29, 2017.

=== Denver Broncos ===
On August 11, 2020, Dotson signed with the Denver Broncos. He started eight games at right tackle for Denver in 2020.
