= Miller Farr =

American football player (1943–2023)

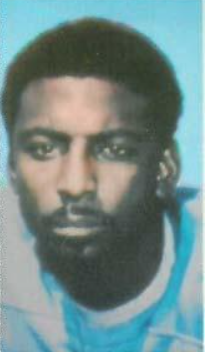
- Farr in 1969

No. 20, 27, 44
- Position: Cornerback

Personal information
- Born: April 8, 1943; Beaumont, Texas, U.S.
- Died: July 18, 2023 (aged 80)
- Listed height: 6 ft 1 in (1.85 m)
- Listed weight: 190 lb (86 kg)

Career information
- College: Wichita State
- AFL draft: 1965: red shirt 1st round, 2nd overall pick

Career history
- Denver Broncos (1965); San Diego Chargers (1965–1966); Houston Oilers (1967–1969); St. Louis Cardinals (1970–1972); Detroit Lions (1973); Florida Blazers (1974)

Awards and highlights
- 3× AFL All-Star (1967, 1968, 1969); AFL All-Time 2nd Team; 2× First-team All-AFL (1967, 1968); Second-team All-AFL (1969); AFL interceptions co-leader (1967); All-WFL (1974)

Career statistics
- Interceptions: 35
- Touchdowns: 6
- Games played: 113
- Stats at Pro Football Reference

Miller Farr Jr. (April 8, 1943 – July 18, 2023) was an American professional football player who was a cornerback for 10 seasons in the American Football League (AFL) and the National Football League (NFL).

Farr attended Wichita State University, lettering in football and track. In his senior year, he led the nation in kickoff and punt returns. He was a member of a family of athletes and artists, including a brother and cousins, football players Mel Farr, Lem Barney, and Jerry LeVias, and cousin, singer Marvin Gaye.

Farr was a first-round draft choice by the AFL's Denver Broncos in the 1965 Red Shirt draft, then went to the San Diego Chargers for 1965 and 1966. He played defensive back for the Houston Oilers from 1967 through 1969. During the 1967 season, Farr was the AFL co-leader in interceptions with ten (t – Westmoreland, Janik). Despite a bout with hepatitis, he intercepted two passes for touchdowns in one game in 1968. He led the AFL in interception touchdowns that year and was selected All-AFL and All-Pro.

Following the AFL–NFL merger, Farr signed with the St. Louis Cardinals beginning in 1970 where he finished out his NFL career. In 1974, he played with the Florida Blazers of the World Football League.

A three time American Football League All-Star, Farr established an AFL record for the most touchdowns on pass interceptions in a game (2) and tied the AFL record for a season (3). Farr was selected to the All-Time All-AFL second-team.

Farr was from a family full of professional football players. He was the older brother of former NFL player Mel Farr as well as the uncle of former players Mel Farr, Jr. and Mike Farr. He and his brother attended Hebert High School in Beaumont, Texas, and were among 16 pro footballers given the keys to the city in 1971.

Farr died on July 18, 2023, at the age of 80.

== See also ==
- List of American Football League players
