= Dan Moore (American football) =

American football player (born 1998)

Dan Moore Jr.
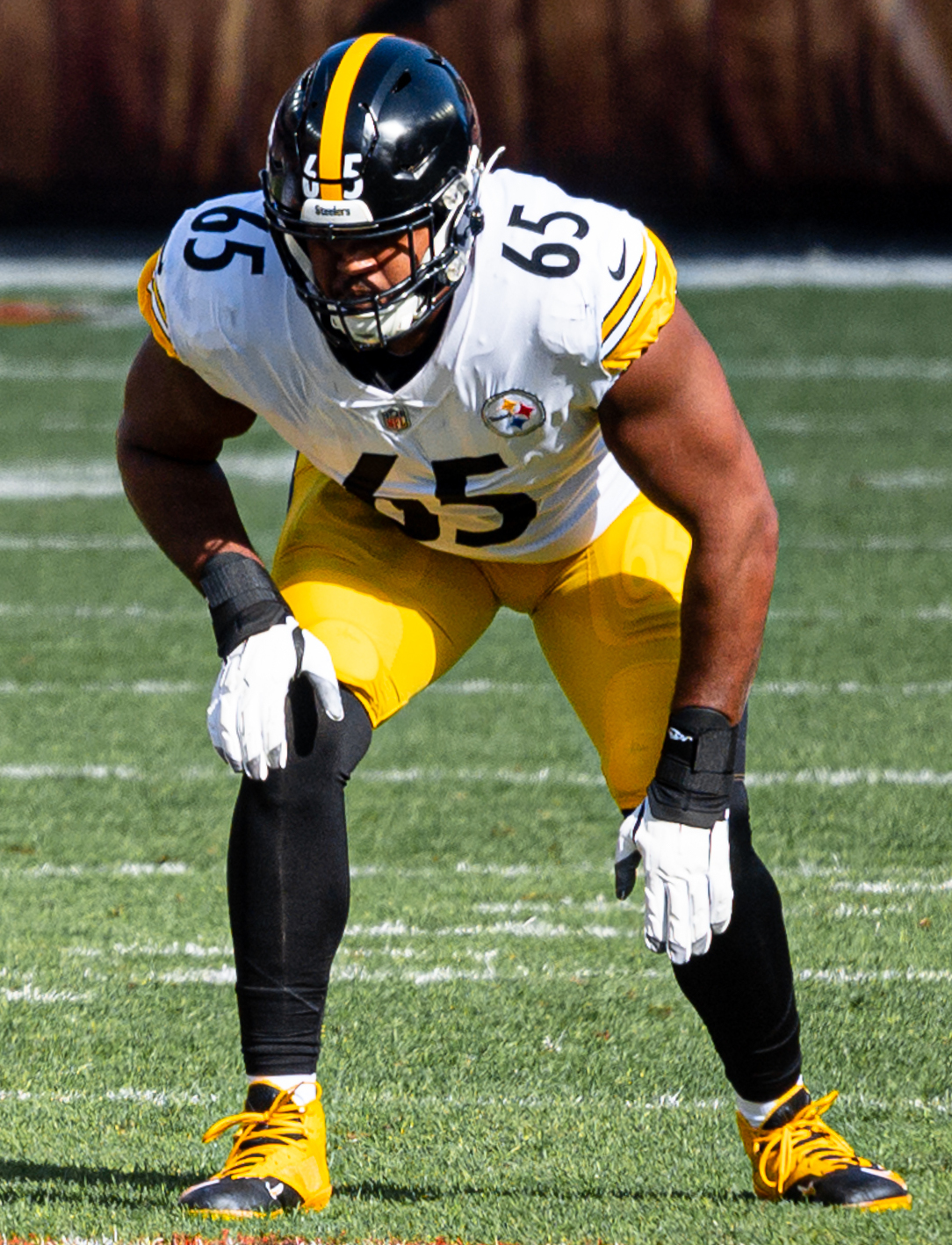
- Moore with the Pittsburgh Steelers in 2021

No. 75 – Tennessee Titans
- Position: Offensive tackle
- Roster status: Active

Personal information
- Born: September 28, 1998 (age 28); Beaumont, Texas, U.S.
- Listed height: 6 ft 5 in (1.96 m)
- Listed weight: 315 lb (143 kg)

Career information
- High school: West Brook (Beaumont)
- College: Texas A&M (2017–2020)
- NFL draft: 2021: 4th round, 128th overall pick

Career history
- Pittsburgh Steelers (2021–2024); Tennessee Titans (2025–present)

Awards and highlights
- Second-team All-SEC (2020)

Career NFL statistics as of 2025
- Games played: 82
- Games started: 82
- Stats at Pro Football Reference

Dan Moore Jr. (born September 28, 1998) is an American professional football offensive tackle for the Tennessee Titans of the National Football League (NFL). He played college football for the Texas A&M Aggies and was selected by the Pittsburgh Steelers in the fourth round of the 2021 NFL draft.

== Early life ==
Moore was born in Beaumont, Texas and attended West Brook High School.

== College career ==
In June 2016, Moore committed to play college football for the Oklahoma State Cowboys. In December 2016, Moore de-committed from Oklahoma State and committed to Texas A&M. Moore, a 3-star offensive guard recruit, also had offers from Colorado State, Mississippi State, Missouri, and Ole Miss, among others.

In his 4-year college career at Texas A&M from 2017–2020, Moore played in 44 games with 37 starts. Moore played in 8 games as a true freshman in 2017, starting one at right tackle. He switched to left tackle going into his sophomore season, starting 36 consecutive games at left tackle from 2018–2020. He was named Second-Team All-SEC during his senior year in 2020, starting all 10 games at left tackle.

== Professional career ==
Pre-draft measurables
Height	Weight	Arm length	Hand span	Wingspan	40-yard dash	10-yard split	20-yard split	20-yard shuttle	Three-cone drill	Vertical jump	Broad jump	Bench press
6 ft 5 5/8 in (1.97 m)	311 lb (141 kg)	34 1/2 in (0.88 m)	10 1/8 in (0.26 m)	6 ft 11 1/2 in (2.12 m)	5.19 s	1.84 s	2.91 s	4.73 s	7.56 s	30.5 in (0.77 m)	9 ft 2 in (2.79 m)	28 reps
All values from Pro Day

=== Pittsburgh Steelers ===
Moore was drafted by the Pittsburgh Steelers in the fourth round, 128th overall, of the 2021 NFL draft. On May 18, 2021, Moore signed his four-year rookie contract with Pittsburgh. Moore was the Steelers starting left tackle for 16 games during the 2021 season, only missing one game due to an ankle injury. Moore started all 17 games at left tackle in 2022, and was again the starting left tackle in 2023, only missing one game due to an knee injury. Moore finished the 2024 season with a league-high 12 sacks allowed.

=== Tennessee Titans ===
On March 13, 2025, Moore signed with the Tennessee Titans on a four-year, $82 million contract, which includes $50 million in guaranteed money and $30 million in the first year.
