= Billy Baggett =

American football player (1929–2015)

No. 24
- Positions: Halfback, defensive back

Personal information
- Born: June 2, 1929; Greenville, Texas, U.S.
- Died: May 20, 2015 (aged 85); Lake Charles, Louisiana, U.S.
- Listed height: 5 ft 11 in (1.80 m)
- Listed weight: 175 lb (79 kg)

Career information
- High school: South Park (Beaumont, Texas)
- College: LSU
- NFL draft: 1951: 22nd round, 265th overall pick

Career history
- Dallas Texans (1952)

Career NFL statistics
- Rushing yards: 65
- Rushing average: 3.4
- Receptions: 3
- Receiving yards: 41
- Total touchdowns: 1
- Stats at Pro Football Reference

William Boyce Baggett (June 2, 1929 – May 20, 2015) was an American professional football player who was a halfback in the National Football League (NFL) in 1952 for the Dallas Texans. Prior to playing professionally, Baggett played college football at Louisiana State University. In 1951, he played in the Blue–Gray Football Classic. During the 1951 NFL draft, Baggett was drafted in the 22nd, 265 overall, by the Los Angeles Rams. However, he never played with the team.

Baggett died on May 20, 2015.
