= Herman Fontenot =

American football player (born 1963)

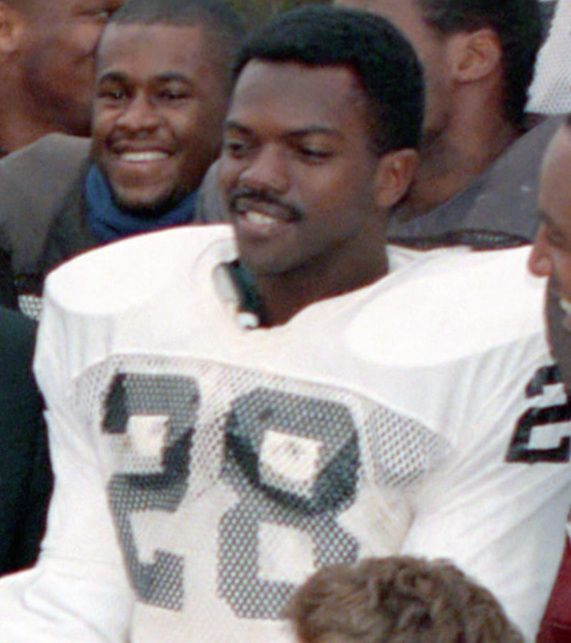
- Fontenot with the Cleveland Browns in 1988

No. 28, 29, 27
- Position: Running back

Personal information
- Born: September 12, 1963 (age 63); Beaumont, Texas, U.S.
- Listed height: 6 ft 0 in (1.83 m)
- Listed weight: 206 lb (93 kg)

Career information
- High school: Beaumont Charlton-Pollard (TX)
- College: LSU
- NFL draft: 1985: undrafted

Career history
- Cleveland Browns (1985–1988); Green Bay Packers (1989–1990)

Career NFL statistics
- Rushing yards: 370
- Receiving yards: 1,453
- Touchdowns: 8
- Stats at Pro Football Reference

Herman Joseph Fontenot Jr. (born September 12, 1963) is an American former professional football player who was a running back in the National Football League (NFL) for six seasons with the Cleveland Browns and Green Bay Packers. In 83 career games played, he had 370 rushing yards, 143 receptions, 1,453 receiving yards, and eight total touchdowns.

Born and raised in Texas, Fontenot played college football for the LSU Tigers, where he was moved from running back to wide receiver. He went undrafted in the 1985 NFL draft, but signed with the Cleveland Browns, who moved him back to running back. He played four seasons with the team and was primarily a backup, used as a change of pace running back. Fontenot was traded to the Green Bay Packers in 1989, and was utilized the same way. He played two seasons for the Packers before leaving football after not being signed prior to the 1991 season.

== Early life and college ==
Fontenot was born on September 12, 1963, in Beaumont, Texas, where he was raised by his grandmother. He attended Beaumont Charlton-Pollard High School, where he was a star player on the school's football team. After graduating from high school, he played college football at Louisiana State University. In his freshman season, he was primarily used as a kick returner. For the season, he caught two passes for 26 yards and had nine kick returns in limited action. After his freshman season, the steel plants both he and his mother worked at shut down, which led to Fontenot considering dropping out of school to try and support his mother and two younger siblings. Ultimately, he stayed in school and returned to the football field for his sophomore season at LSU.

In 1982, both Fontenot and fellow sophomore Eric Martin were converted from running back to wide receiver in an attempt to spread out the team's offense and allow for more passing targets, as well as utilizing the skill sets of both players. After a position battle between the two during the summer, Martin won the primary pass-catching job, with Fontenot primarily being a blocking wide receiver. He finished his second season with eight catches for 83 yards and two touchdowns. LSU intended to get Fontenot more involved in the passing game for his junior season on top of his blocking responsibilities. For the season, he caught 22 passes for 330 yards. LSU brought on a new coaching staff for Fontenot's senior season. New wide receivers coach Jerry Sullivan complimented Fontenot's blocking ability, noting that it gave the team an "added dimension" on offense. He finished his senior season with 25 catches for 349 yards and two touchdowns.

== Cleveland Browns ==
After his college football career ended, Fontenot was selected by the New Jersey Generals with the 127th overall pick in the 9th round of the 1985 USFL draft. He never signed with the Generals, and after being undrafted in the 1985 NFL draft, he signed with the Cleveland Browns. In training camp, Fontenot, who had been moved back to his original position of running back, became a favorite of head coach Marty Schottenheimer, who praised his fluidity and stated that he had a good chance of making the team despite the acquisitions of Kevin Mack and Greg Allen that season. Fontenot began the season on the injured reserve list, but was signed to the active roster in October due to Allen getting injured. He spent the rest of the season primarily on special teams, with the highlight of his season being an 81-yard kick return in the second half of a 28–21 win against the Houston Oilers on December 15.

With the release of Allen and the signing of kick return specialist Gerald McNeil, the 1986 Cleveland Browns season saw Fontenot move to a change of pace running back role behind Mack and Earnest Byner instead of just being the kick returner. Due to injuries to Mack early in the season and Byner late in the season, Fontenot's role on the team increased significantly, and he saw more playing time as the season went on. On November 2 against the Indianapolis Colts, Fontenot got his first NFL touchdown, a 72-yard pass during a 24–9 Browns win. He also threw a 46-yard touchdown pass to Webster Slaughter on a trick play at the start of the game in a 47–17 win against the San Diego Chargers in the final game of the season. Fontenot finished the season with 47 catches for 559 yards. His 47 receptions were second on the team behind Brian Brennan. He also had 12 receptions for 128 yards and two touchdowns in the Browns' two playoff games. In the 1986 AFC Championship Game against the Denver Broncos, Schottenheimer ran a play to give the ball to Fontenot on third and two in overtime. The play failed, leading the Browns to punt and eventually lose, which drew criticism from reporters after the game.

Entering the 1987 season, Fontenot was firmly in the third running back position on the depth chart behind Byner and Mack, but ahead of rookie draft pick Tim Manoa. During training camp, he injured his hamstring. This, combined with a healthy Byner and Mack, led to his role being significantly reduced, finishing the season with four receptions. He spent most of the season on special teams, leading the group with 17 tackles on kick and punt returns. The Browns' running back group remained the same for 1988, with Fontenot being the third string running back. However, he was named the starting kick returner and special teams captain for the season. The highlight of his season occurred on October 30 against the Cincinnati Bengals when Fontenot recovered a blocked punt for a touchdown and had an 84-yard kick return in a 23–16 Browns win. He finished the season with 19 receptions for 170 yards and a touchdown, and also had a career-high 28 rushing attempts for 87 yards.

After the 1988 season ended, Fontenot became an unprotected free agent. Green Bay Packers head coach Lindy Infante, who was offensive coordinator for the Browns, wanted to sign Fontenot to the team during the offseason, as did Schottenheimer, who was now head coach for the Kansas City Chiefs. Ultimately, Fontenot decided to re-sign with the Browns in early April. Three weeks later, the 1989 NFL draft took place. The Browns traded up to select running back Eric Metcalf with the 13th overall pick in the draft. This made Fontenot expandable, and shortly after drafting Metcalf, the Browns traded Fontenot, a 1990 first-round pick, and another draft pick to the Packers in order to draft Lawyer Tillman with the 31st overall pick.

== Green Bay Packers ==
In July, Fontenot opted not to report to training camp, as he wanted a pay raise to the contract originally offered by the Packers in March rather than the one he signed with the Browns. He eventually reported to camp after being absent for five days and was fined $8,000. During training camp, he was fighting in a crowded group for playing time opposite Brent Fullwood, who had won the primary starting job early on. In back-to-back games in October, Fontenot had a two-touchdown performance against the Dallas Cowboys and a late touchdown catch to lead the Packers to a comeback win against the Atlanta Falcons. He followed that up with seven catches for 76 yards on October 29 against the Detroit Lions, and had eight catches for 58 yards on November 26 against the Minnesota Vikings. Fontenot finished the season with 40 receptions for 372 yards and three touchdowns despite dealing with an ankle injury throughout the season, and was the Packers selection for the Ed Block Courage Award.

Fontenot began the 1990 season holding out for a new contract. He eventually signed one in early September, missing all of training camp and the preseason as a result. Despite signing the contract, he was still unhappy and was missing team meetings and practices. As a result, the Packers suspended Fontenot at the beginning of October. The suspension was originally planned to be two weeks, but Fontenot was reinstated one week later after a 27–13 loss to the Chicago Bears. He returned to action the following week against the Tampa Bay Buccaneers, but injured his hamstring, which caused him to miss another week. Fontenot finished the season with 31 receptions for 293 yards and a touchdown in 14 games. In 1991, Fontenot had an opportunity to acquire the starting running back position, as the training camp battle was between Fontenot, Keith Woodside, and Vince Workman, with none of the three having a clear advantage heading into the preseason. Fontenot ended up holding out the entire preseason looking for a new contract. Instead of signing him, the third-down plays were given to Workman, who impressed the Packers enough in the preseason to give him the job, leading to them giving up signing Fontenot and ending his professional career.

== Later life ==
After retiring from the NFL, Fontenot moved to Texas, where he worked in 3D printing. Among his work was the restoration of a 193-year old menorah in Houston.

== NFL career statistics ==
Legend
**Bold**	Career high

=== Regular season ===
Year	Team	Games		Rushing					Receiving				
Year	Team	GP	GS	Att	Yds	Avg	Lng	TD	Rec	Yds	Avg	Lng	TD
1985	CLE	9	0	0	0	0.0	0	0	2	19	9.5	17	0
1986	CLE	**16**	**3**	25	**105**	4.2	16	**1**	**47**	**559**	**11.9**	**72**	1
1987	CLE	12	0	15	33	2.2	14	0	4	40	10.0	25	0
1988	CLE	**16**	1	**28**	87	3.1	17	0	19	170	8.9	15	1
1989	GNB	**16**	0	17	69	4.1	**19**	**1**	40	372	9.3	38	**3**
1990	GNB	14	0	17	76	**4.5**	18	0	31	293	9.5	59	1
		83	4	102	370	3.6	19	2	143	1,453	10.2	72	6

=== Playoffs ===
Year	Team	Games		Rushing					Receiving				
Year	Team	GP	GS	Att	Yds	Avg	Lng	TD	Rec	Yds	Avg	Lng	TD
1985	CLE	1	0	0	0	0.0	0	0	1	5	5.0	5	0
1986	CLE	**2**	**1**	**6**	**11**	**1.8**	**7**	0	**12**	**128**	**10.7**	**37**	**2**
1987	CLE	**2**	0	0	0	0.0	0	0	2	20	10.0	11	0
1988	CLE	1	0	3	-2	-0.7	5	0	0	0	0.0	0	0
		6	1	9	9	1.0	7	0	15	153	10.2	37	2
