= Central High School (Beaumont, Texas) =

School in Beaumont, Texas, United States

Central Medical Magnet High School (CMMHS) was a magnet high school in Beaumont, Texas. It was operated by the Beaumont Independent School District. The mascot was the jaguar.

== History ==
CMMHS was established in 1986 by the merger of Beaumont Charlton-Pollard High School and French High School. In 2006 it received a medical magnet program.

In 2017 Hurricane Harvey (as Tropical Storm Harvey) hit the Beaumont area, damaging Central High's main building. The gymnasium remained open.

The school merged with Clifton J. Ozen High School in 2018 to form Beaumont United High School.

== Athletics ==
Each year Central and Ozen had an athletic match, the Soul Bowl. Central also had an athletic match with West Brook High School, known as the Beaumont Bowl.

== Notable alumni ==
- Keith Alex, former NFL guard
- T.J. Atwood, professional basketball player
- Anthony Collins, former NFL offensive tackle
- Malcolm Frank, former WLAF, NFL, and CFL defensive back
- Jarmar Gulley, professional basketball player
- Michael Jacquet, football cornerback (Jacksonville Jaguars)
- PJ Locke, football safety (Denver Broncos)
- Leeland McElroy, former NFL running back / kick returner
- Donald Mitchell, former NFL cornerback
- Nijal Pearson, professional basketball player
- Daryl Price, former NFL defensive end
- Roderick Riley, former professional basketball player
- Brittney Rodriguez, actress (Red Rocket)
- Ivory Williams, sprinter
