= James M. Simmons =

American musician and administrator (born 1942)

14th President of Lamar University
- In office 1999–2013
- Preceded by: Rex Cottle
- Succeeded by: Kenneth Evans

Personal details
- Born: 17 March 1942 (age 84) Beaumont, Texas
- Spouse: Susan Simmons
- Education: Memphis State University
- Profession: Educator, Administrator, Musician

James M. Simmons (commonly referred to as Jimmy Simmons or Dr. Simmons) is an educational administrator, musician and former university president at Lamar University. James Simmons served as the 10th president of Lamar. He resigned the presidency effective July 1, 2013 to return to the Lamar faculty as a music instructor. To honor his service to Lamar, The Texas State University System Board of Regents named him President Emeritus and approved the naming of the James M. "Jimmy" Simmons Music Building. The City of Beaumont formally recognized his service to Lamar and the community by changing the name of University Drive to Jimmy Simmons Boulevard.

Simmons is widely regarded as one of the most successful presidents in Lamar University's history. He has won numerous awards for his successful administration. In 2011 the Press Club of Southeast Texas named him Newsmaker of the Decade. He previously received the award as Newsmaker of the Year in 2009 and 1999; Simmons is the only person to ever win the award twice.

In February 2011 Simmons was named a Signature Sinfonian by Phi Mu Alpha Sinfonia, a music fraternity for men with chapters at college campuses across the country. This award is given to "any Sinfonian who has exhibited a high standard of accomplishment in the profession or a commitment to service."

In April 2009 Simmons received the prestigious Chief Executive Leadership Award for region IV of the Council for the Advancement and Support of Education (CASE). Region IV of CASE includes: Texas, New Mexico, Arkansas, Oklahoma and Mexico.

Simmons took the reins of the Beaumont Independent School District Board of Trustees as board president in 2014 at the request of Texas Education Commissioner, Michael Williams. The former BISD board of trustees was suspended by the Texas Education Agency and replaced by a select group of managers until new leadership could be identified.

== Education ==
Simmons graduated from Beaumont High School in the spring of 1960. James Simmons started his college studies at Memphis State University in the fall of 1960. He graduated with a Bachelor of Science degree in music in 1964. He earned a master's degree from the University of Houston and a doctorate from McNeese State University.

== Music ==
Throughout his educational career, Simmons has attracted acclaim as a performer on clarinet, saxophone and piano and continues to maintain a performance schedule.

== Lamar ==
Simmons’ career with Lamar began in 1970 when he joined the faculty as an instructor and director of the marching band. He rose through the ranks, later serving as director of bands and as chair of the Department of Music and Theatre before his appointment as dean. Dr. Simmons took office September 1, 1999 as the 10th president of Lamar University. Under Dr. Simmons leadership, Lamar has advanced on many fronts. One example is the Investing in the Future Campaign started in 2006 which ultimately raised $132 million for Lamar at the time of Simmons's retirement. The campaign started with an initial goal of $50 million. Due to campaign success, the goal was increased two times. The first increase was $100 million in 2008. The goal was again increased to $125 million in January 2012 after raising $95 million with more than a year remaining in the campaign.
