= Clifton J. Ozen High School =

School in Beaumont, Texas, United States

Clifton J. Ozen High School was a fine arts and technology magnet high school in the city of Beaumont, Texas. It was operated by the Beaumont Independent School District and was created during the 1997–1998 school year as part of a new student assignment plan formulated for the district.

The school merged with Central High School in 2018 to form Beaumont United High School. The new school uses the former Ozen campus.

== Notable alumni ==
- Kendrick Perkins class of 2003 - In 2011 he donated a marquee to the school
- Teezo Touchdown
