= Mel Farr =

American football player and businessman (1944–2015)

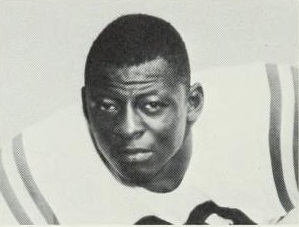
- Farr from 1965 UCLA yearbook

No. 24
- Position: Running back

Personal information
- Born: November 3, 1944; Beaumont, Texas, U.S.
- Died: August 3, 2015 (aged 70); Detroit, Michigan, U.S.
- Listed height: 6 ft 2 in (1.88 m)
- Listed weight: 210 lb (95 kg)

Career information
- High school: Hebert (Beaumont)
- College: UCLA
- NFL draft: 1967: 1st round, 7th overall pick

Career history
- Detroit Lions (1967–1973)

Awards and highlights
- NFL Offensive Rookie of the Year (1967); Second-team All-Pro (1970); 2× Pro Bowl (1967, 1970); Consensus All-American (1966); 2× First-team All-Pacific-8 (1965, 1966)

Career NFL statistics
- Rushing yards: 3,072
- Rushing average: 4.2
- Receptions: 146
- Receiving yards: 1,374
- Total touchdowns: 36
- Stats at Pro Football Reference

Melvin Farr (November 3, 1944 – August 3, 2015) was an American professional football player and businessman.

A native of Beaumont, Texas, Farr played college football as a halfback on the 1965 and 1966 UCLA Bruins football teams that were ranked No. 4 and No. 5 respectively in the final AP Polls. He was selected as a consensus first-team All-American in 1966, gained over 1,000 yards from scrimmage in both 1965 and 1966, and was inducted into the UCLA Athletics Hall of Fame in 1988.

Farr was drafted by the Detroit Lions in the first round, seventh overall pick, of the 1967 NFL/AFL draft and played seven years as a running back for the Lions. He led the Lions in both rushing and receiving in 1967, totaling 1,177 yards from scrimmage as a rookie, and was selected as the NFL Rookie of the Year. He was twice selected to play in the Pro Bowl, in 1967 and 1970. In a career shortened by injury, Farr gained a total of 4,446 yards from scrimmage and scored 36 touchdowns during his seven years in the NFL.

After retiring from football, Farr acquired a Ford Motor Company dealership in 1975, eventually expanding his business to 11 dealerships in five states. By 1998, Farr's automotive group was cited as the largest African-American owned company in the country. His business failed in 2002 following adverse publicity and lawsuits relating to sales and finance practices.

== Early life ==
Farr was born in Beaumont, Texas, in 1944, the son of a truck driver and a domestic worker. He graduated from Hebert High School, a segregated school in Beaumont, Texas, in 1963, where he lettered in football, basketball, baseball, and track. He was named all-state in football and track and all-district in basketball. His older brother, Miller Farr, played nine seasons as a defensive back in the NFL from 1965 to 1973.

== UCLA ==
Farr began his college football career at Santa Monica City College before transferring to UCLA in 1964. He then sustained a hairline fracture in his left arm at the end of August 1964. After returning from the injury, Farr appeared in 10 games in 1964 and gained 86 rushing yards on 27 carries.

During the 1965 and 1966 seasons, Farr and Gary Beban were the core of a UCLA backfield dubbed the "dream backfield" in Sports Illustrated. In 1965, Farr was the starting halfback for Tommy Prothro's UCLA Bruins team that compiled an 8–2–1 record, won the Athletic Association of Western Universities (AAWU) championship, defeated No. 1-ranked Michigan State in the 1966 Rose Bowl, and was ranked No. 4 in the final AP Poll. Farr totaled 1,001 yards from scrimmage (821 rushing and 180 receiving) and eight touchdowns. He ran 49 yards for a touchdown in an upset victory over No. 6-ranked USC in 1965, and his average of 6.7 yards per carry in 1965 led the AAWU and ranked second in the NCAA. At the end of the 1965 season, he was selected by the conference coaches as a first-team halfback on the 1965 All-Pacific Athletic Conference football team and by the United Press International to the All-West Coast football team.

In 1966, Farr was the starting halfback for the UCLA Bruins team that compiled a 9–1 record and was ranked No. 5 in the final AP Poll. Farr totaled 1,034 yards from scrimmage (809 rushing and 150 receiving) and 11 touchdowns and finished seventh in the Heisman Trophy voting. At the end of the 1966 season, Farr was a consensus first-team running back on the 1966 College Football All-America Team.

In 1988, Farr was inducted into the UCLA Athletics Hall of Fame.

== Detroit Lions ==
Farr was selected by the Detroit Lions in the first round, seventh overall pick, of the 1967 NFL/AFL draft. As a rookie for the Lions in 1967, Farr rushed for 197 yards in a game against the Minnesota Vikings, totaled 1,177 yards from scrimmage, and ranked fifth in the NFL with 860 rushing yards. He led the Lions in both rushing yardage and with 39 receptions, and he was selected by the United Press International as the NFL Rookie of the Year. The Associated Press picked Farr as the Offensive Rookie of the Year and teammate Lem Barney as the Defensive Rookie of the Year.

In October 1968, Farr was named by the AP as the NFL offensive player of the week after totaling 210 yards (138 rushing, 72 receiving) and scoring three touchdowns in a 28–10 victory over the Chicago Bears. The following week, he set a club record with 29 carries, good for 145 rushing yards. He led the NFL with 490 rushing yards through the first six games of the 1968 season, but he was injured on the third play of the game against the San Francisco 49ers, missed five games, and underwent surgery on his left knee. He finished the 1968 season with 972 yards from scrimmage, 597 rushing and 375 receiving. His average of 66.3 rushing yards per game ranked fifth in the NFL in 1968.

Farr returned from knee surgery in 1969, but he sustained a serious injury to his left knee in the fifth game of the season on a hit by Bennie McRae of the Chicago Bears. The injury snapped the inside ligament in half and was considered more serious than his 1968 injury. In five games during the 1968 season, Farr rushed for 245 yards on 58 carries.

In 1970, Farr returned from his second knee surgery and totaled 930 yards from scrimmage, 717 rushing and 213 receiving. He was selected to play in his second Pro Bowl after the 1970 season. Having missed the Lions' Thanksgiving Day games in 1968 and 1969, Farr rushed for 121 yards and caught two long passes in the Lions' 1970 Thanksgiving Day game.

Farr and teammate Lem Barney recorded background vocals on Marvin Gaye's "What's Going On", released in January 1971.

In July 1971, Farr signed a three-year contract with the Lions. He appeared in nine games in 1971, but only one as a starter, as he continued to be hampered by injuries and lost the starting running back job to Steve Owens (who rushed for over 1,000 yards in 1971) and Altie Taylor. Farr totaled 64 rushing yards on 22 carries in 1971.

In 1972, Farr remained with the Lions, but as a backup to Steve Owens. Farr had his best game of the season on October 22, 1972, gaining 96 yards and scoring two touchdowns on 22 carries against the San Diego Chargers. Farr totaled 216 rushing yards on 62 carries for the 1972 season.

In 1973, Farr appeared in 11 games, seven as a starter, rushing for 373 yards on 97 carries. In mid-December, Farr said he was considering retirement and called 1973 "one of the worst seasons for me as far as frustration."

In March 1974, Farr was traded by the Lions to the Houston Oilers. Twelve days later, Farr announced his retirement from professional football.

== NFL career statistics ==
Legend
**Bold**	Career high

=== Regular season ===
Year	Team	Games		Rushing					Receiving				
Year	Team	GP	GS	Att	Yds	Avg	Lng	TD	Rec	Yds	Avg	Lng	TD
1967	DET	13	12	**206**	**860**	4.2	**57**	3	**39**	317	8.1	31	3
1968	DET	9	7	128	597	**4.7**	46	3	24	**375**	**15.6**	**86**	**4**
1969	DET	5	5	58	245	4.2	52	4	13	94	7.2	24	0
1970	DET	12	12	166	717	4.3	36	**9**	29	213	7.3	58	2
1971	DET	9	1	22	64	2.9	14	0	5	60	12.0	39	1
1972	DET	10	4	62	216	3.5	22	3	10	132	13.2	42	0
1973	DET	11	7	97	373	3.8	32	4	26	183	7.0	27	0
Career		69	48	739	3,072	4.2	57	26	146	1,374	9.4	86	10

=== Playoffs ===
Year	Team	Games		Rushing					Receiving				
Year	Team	GP	GS	Att	Yds	Avg	Lng	TD	Rec	Yds	Avg	Lng	TD
1970	DET	1	1	12	31	2.6	5	0	0	0	0.0	0	0
Career		1	1	12	31	2.6	5	0	0	0	0.0	0	0

== Auto dealerships ==
As a teenager in Texas, Farr helped his father, Miller Farr Sr., buy old cars, often fixer-uppers from the junkyard, and sell them from a makeshift car lot in the family's front yard, called Farr's New and Used. The Lions were owned by William Clay Ford Sr., the last surviving grandson of Henry Ford, and Farr worked for Ford Motor Company in the dealer development division during the off-season. In November 1975, after retiring from the NFL, Farr invested his savings to purchase a boarded-up Ford dealership in Oak Park, Michigan.

During the 1980 recession, Ford sales suffered. Farr began promoting the dealership in television advertisements by portraying a red-caped superhero in a stylish suit, flying through the sky as "Mel Farr, your superstar dealer," promising that if the viewer came to Mel Farr Ford, he or she would receive "a Farr better deal."

By 1997, Farr had expanded his Mel Farr Auto Group to 14 auto dealerships in five states (Michigan, Ohio, New Jersey, Maryland, and Texas) with annual sales in excess of $500 million. By 1998, Farr's dealership group grossed $596.6 million, making it the top black-owned business in the United States and the 33rd largest auto dealership in the US.

Farr specialized in the subprime market, expanded into the used car market, and offered credit at rates up to 25 percent. In 2000, Farr's companies became the subject of negative publicity focusing on their sales and credit practices. There were legal problems surrounding Farr's On-Time Device, which prevented drivers of leased vehicles from starting the car if they missed payments. In June 2000, Farr settled a suit with customers who complained that the device turned off their cars when they were in motion. Many claimed they had not been late with their payments. Each of the 1,500 customers received $200 worth of coupons for their troubles.

In January 2002, Farr was in discussions to sell his franchises in Oak Park and Waterford Township, Michigan, to Ford Motor Company, who had outstanding liens with Farr. The franchises were sold in April 2002 and subsequently closed. After defaulting on a $36.5 million bond package, Farr sold his final dealership in 2003.

== Family and later years ==
Farr was married to his first wife, Mae Rutha (Forbes) Farr, in the mid-1960s. They had two sons, Mel Farr Jr., born in 1966, and Mike Farr, born in 1967, and one daughter, Monet. Both sons went on to play football at UCLA, and then professional football in the NFL.

Farr was married three times. He was divorced from his first wife, Mae, in 2002 after more than 35 years of marriage. From 2004 to 2009, Farr was married to Linda Johnson Rice, president and CEO of Johnson Publishing Co., publisher of Ebony and Jet magazines. His third wife was Jasmine Rozier, with whom he had a daughter, Melia (b. November 3, 2015), born shortly after Farr died.

Farr died at his home in Detroit on August 3, 2015, at age 70 of a massive heart attack. Farr also suffered from stage 3 CTE. He was one of at least 345 NFL players to be diagnosed after death with this disease, which is caused by repeated hits to the head.
