= Charlton-Pollard High School =

American high school

Charlton-Pollard High School was a segregated high school for black students, operated by the Beaumont Independent School District. The school colors were blue and white, and the mascot was the bulldog. It was located in the South End area, in proximity to an oil refinery.

== History ==
Named after two people, it opened in 1900. Its main athletic rival was Hebert High School. Carol T. Taylor Mitchell, who once taught as a science teacher at the school circa 1970, described its facilities as inferior to those of the mostly white Austin Junior High School.

Charlton-Pollard consolidated with Beaumont High School to form Beaumont Charlton-Pollard High School in 1975. The merger happened since Joe J. Fisher, a U.S. district judge, asked Beaumont ISD to speedily desegregate.

The Charlton-Pollard High School Alumni Association exists. As of 2017 Bettye Duplantier, of the class of 1963, is the president of the association.

== Notable alumni ==
- Raleigh H. Brown, principal of Central High School from 1044 to 1950 when it closed and the principal of Booker T. Washington High School for 18 years
- Wayne Moore – former NFL offensive tackle
- Jess Phillips – former NFL running back / defensive back
- Bubba Smith – former NFL defensive end
- Tody Smith – former NFL defensive end
- C. L. Whittington – former NFL defensive back
