= Temple Independent School District =

School district in Texas, United States

Coordinates: 31°05′47.7″N 97°20′43.4″W

- United States, Texas

Other information
- Website: www.tisd.org

Temple Independent School District is a public school district based in Temple, Texas, United States. Temple schools began instruction June 12, 1883. It is the largest employer in Temple, with 1300 employees.

== District leadership ==
- Superintendent of Schools: Dr. Bobby Ott, Ed.D.
- Deputy Superintendent of Academics and School Leadership: Lisa Adams, Ed.D.
- Assistant Superintendent of Student Services: Tijuana Hudson
- Assistant Superintendent of Facilities & Operations: Kent Boyd, M.Ed.
- Assistant Superintendent of Human Resources: Donna Ward, Ed.D.
- Assistant Superintendent of Finance: Brandy Stanford
- Chief Academic Officer: Renota Rogers, Ed. D.
- Chief Technology Officer: Vance Willis

== Board of trustees ==
In 2025, TISD Board of Trustees was named "Board of the Year" by the ESC XII Service Center.

- District 1 - Virginia Suarez, Secretary (term May 2025-May 2028)
- District 2 - Bre'Layshia Alexander (term May 2026-May 2029)
- District 3 - Dan Posey, President (term May 2024-May 2027)
- District 4 - Ronnie Gaines, Vice President (term May 2024-May 2027)
- District 5 - Dawn Cook (term May 2024-May 2027)
- District 6 - Shannon Dean (term May 2025-May 2028)
- District 7 - Shannon Myers (term May 2026-May 2029)

== Quick Facts ==
- Through the years, Temple ISD has produced over 200 National Merit Scholar Award winners, including Black Achievement and Hispanic Recognition Scholars.
- Temple ISD was the first District in Central Texas to offer the International Baccalaureate (IB) diploma and has, to date, awarded over 100 IB diplomas.
- Temple ISD is expanding the International Baccalaureate program to include a Middle Years Programme at Travis Middle School Science Academy in 2012 and a Primary Years Programme in 2016 at Scott Elementary School.
- The District has exceeded state and national averages in SAT scores for 13 consecutive years and has received numerous other state and national recognition.
- Temple High School has been recognized as one of "America's Top Public High Schools" by Newsweek.
- Temple High School has been recognized by Achieve Texas as a Best Practices high school for the Institutes of Study and Career & Technology Programs.
- Bonham Middle School and Western Hills Elementary School have been recognized as a "Best Public School" by Texas Monthly.

== Schools ==
=== High School (Grades 9-12) ===
- Temple High School
- Edwards Academy

=== Middle Schools (Grades 6-8) ===
- Bonham Middle School
- Lamar Middle School
- Travis Middle School Science Academy

=== Elementary Schools (Grades K-5) ===
- Hector P. Garcia Elementary - It opened in 1998 and has an English-Spanish bilingual program for all students. As of 2019 it had about 500 students.
- Jefferson Elementary
- Kennedy-Powell Elementary
- Raye-Allen Elementary
- Sampson-Howard Elementary
- Scott Elementary
- Thornton Elementary
- Western Hills Elementary

=== Early Childhood Center (Pre-Kindergarten) ===
- Meridith-Dunbar Early Childhood Academy- formerly an elementary
