= Beaumont Independent School District =

School district in Texas, United States

Address
- 3395 Harrison Avenue ESC Region 5 Beaumont, Texas; United States

District information
- Type: Independent school district
- Grades: Pre-K through 12
- Superintendent: Sandi Massey
- Schools: 27 (2024-25)
- NCES District ID: 4809670

Students and staff
- Students: 16,336 (2024–25)
- Teachers: 968.34 (on an FTE basis) (2024–25)
- Staff: 1,363.32 (on an FTE basis) (2024–25)
- Student–teacher ratio: 16.87 (2024–25)

Other information
- TEA District Accountability Rating for 2024-25: D
- Website: bmtisd.com

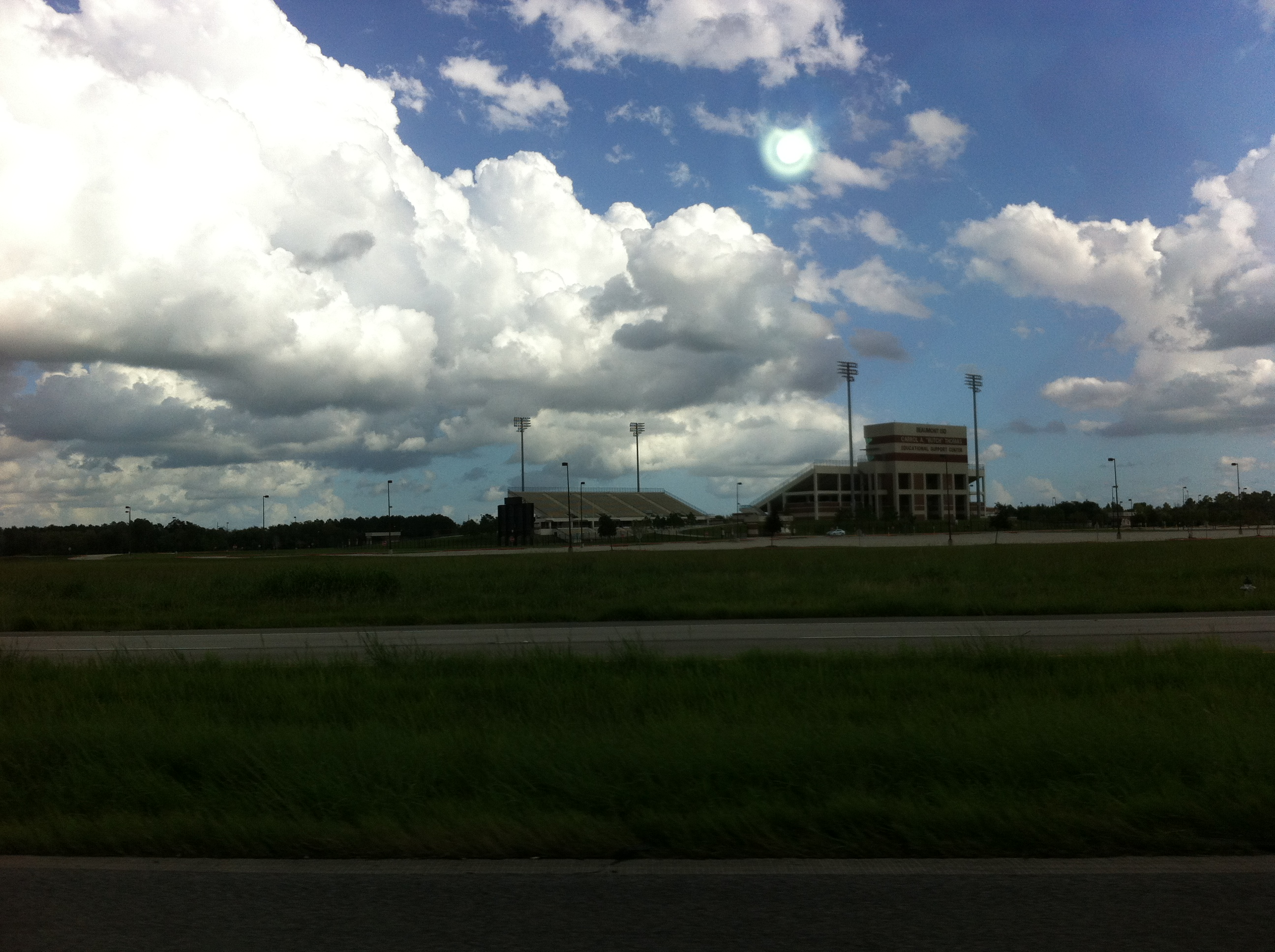
Doggett Family Stadium

Beaumont Independent School District is a U.S. public school district serving Beaumont in Southeast Texas. The district originated in the annexation of the former Beaumont ISD by the South Park Independent School District after its trustees voted in 1983 to dissolve it as the culmination of a struggle over desegregation of both districts. The original Beaumont ISD had previously absorbed the smaller French ISD.

The district, located in Jefferson County, includes Beaumont and a portion of Central Gardens. It formerly included Bevil Oaks.

The district operates fourteen elementary schools, five middle schools, three high schools, a Head Start center, and three other specialized and alternative learning centers.

After multiple campuses in the district received consecutive failing accountability ratings, the Texas Education Agency replaced the elected board of trustees with a board of managers in April 2026.

== History ==
=== Original Beaumont ISD ===
The original Beaumont Independent School District, with Beaumont High School as its senior high school, was founded in 1883 and included the neighborhoods of downtown and the port area, and in 1948 absorbed the smaller French ISD on the north side, with French High School. It was segregated and the high school for black students was Charlton-Pollard High School. In 1975, as part of court-ordered desegregation of the district, this merged with Beaumont High School to form Beaumont Charlton-Pollard High School.

=== South Park ISD ===
South Park Independent School District was founded in 1891 but was shaped by the aftermath of the discovery of oil at Spindletop in 1901; it took its name from the neighborhood at the south end of the city that grew up to house oil-field workers in the resulting boom. It operated South Park High School and came to include the expanding neighborhoods on the west side of Beaumont, where it opened Forest Park High School in the 1960s. It also had a high school for black students, Hebert High School.

=== Dissolution and resulting merger ===
South Park ISD included the wealthiest neighborhoods and could also draw on tax funds from the city's petrochemical plants, while Beaumont ISD was relatively poor. This disparity was exacerbated by white flight. Both school districts were the subject of integration efforts in the 1970s, but whereas the majority-black Beaumont ISD showed progress toward integration, the majority-white South Park ISD attracted less attention and both white parents and local federal judge Joe Fisher resisted integration. Redrawn attendance boundaries as mandated by the federal government in 1970 caused white families to abandon affected neighborhoods. A choice program did not result in desegregation, and the district board resisted an order to devise a plan to achieve it. As a result of rulings by federal district judge Robert Parker, that August students through eighth grade were assigned schools by means of a lottery using ping-pong balls, and effective with the 1982–1983 school year Hebert and Forest Park were merged to form a single integrated high school, West Brook Senior High School. (South Park High School was subsequently also merged into West Brook.)

In the aftermath of the court-ordered integration and after West Brook won the state football championship in its first year, South Park voters declined to re-elect the one black member of the school board, a Lamar University mathematics professor, and defeated a proposal to merge with the Beaumont ISD; black voters in that school district helped defeat the measure because the district had allowed them considerable autonomy in administering the segregated black schools. The board of Beaumont ISD then voted in August 1983 to dissolve their district, as a result of which it was attached to the South Park district to form the present Beaumont ISD. Lawsuits by blacks in both districts followed: by Beaumont ISD voters to nullify the dissolution because they now had no representation on the school board, and by South Park ISD voters against the school board, the Jefferson County Commissioners Court and the Beaumont City Council over lack of representation.

The merger was effective July 1, 1984, with the Texas Education Agency (TEA) stating that South Park ISD merged into Beaumont ISD.

=== Since merger ===
In the first school board vote after the merger, a 4–3 black majority was elected. After one term this became a 4–3 white majority, a situation that continued into the 1990s, when the court orders mandating desegregation expired and the board became split over continuing busing. The Texas Education Agency monitored the district for three years.

In 1994, as a result of continued white flight to particular neighborhoods, a black majority was again elected to the board, which introduced neighborhood school zoning with a promise to ensure access to superior schools for all students. The board appointed Carrol "Butch" Thomas, superintendent of the North Forest Independent School District in Houston, as the district's first black superintendent. He remained for 16 years, until 2012. Racially charged political struggles over representation on the school board continued during his tenure. During the 1980s and 1990s the district continued to consolidate high schools; the buildings of South Park High School and French High School both became middle schools, with French being merged with Beaumont-Charlton-Pollard, which was renamed Central High School.

The city was granted unitary status in 2007, indicating that the schools had been successfully desegregated; however, very few white students were enrolled in district schools. Also in 2007, voters passed a $389 million bond issue, which the school district used to renovate schools, build new ones, and build the Carrol A. "Butch" Thomas Educational Support Center, a stadium for the use of all district high schools that was named after Thomas after he announced his retirement. Some money from the bond issue could not be accounted for, and some district staff and suppliers were found to have misused district funds, including two employees who pleaded guilty to embezzling over $4 million.

Following several investigations including monitoring of testing after admissions from staff that students had received assistance including changes to answer sheets, the Texas Education Agency announced in April 2014 that it would take over the district. A conservator was appointed to manage the district and on July 14, 2014, Vern Butler, former interim superintendent of the El Paso Independent School District, was named interim superintendent at Beaumont, with a seven-member board of managers temporarily replacing the elected board of trustees. Among the managers is James M. Simmons, a former president of Lamar University. In April 2015 the board of managers named John Frossard, superintendent of the Wichita Falls Independent School District, as district superintendent. He announced his retirement in February 2019. In April 2019, Assistant Superintendent for Secondary Schools, Dr. Shannon Allen was unanimously selected by the school board as the lone finalist for Superintendent. The school board was heavily criticized for not looking outside the school district for a new superintendent. The TEA intervention ended gradually, with two or three members of the board of managers replaced by elected trustees each year from 2018 through 2020.

Residents of Bevil Oaks, previously in BISD, repeatedly requested being moved into the Hardin-Jefferson Independent School District (HJISD) for a period until 2018. BISD agreed to allow Bevil Oaks to move into HJISD, which was scheduled to be effective July 1, 2018.

== Finances ==
As of the 2010-2011 school year, the appraised valuation of property in the district was $8,788,794,000. The maintenance tax rate was $0.104 and the bond tax rate was $0.027 per $100 of appraised valuation.

== Schools ==
=== Regular instructional ===
High Schools (Grades 9–12)

- Beaumont United High School (merger of Ozen and Central High Schools)
- King Collegiate Academy
- West Brook High School

Middle Schools (Grades 6–8)

- Marshall Middle School
- Odom Academy Middle School
- Smith Middle School
- South Park Middle School (on the site of the former South Park High School)
- Vincent Middle School

Elementary Schools (Grades K–5)

- Amelia Elementary School
- Blanchette Elementary School
- Caldwood Elementary School
- Charlton-Pollard Elementary School
- Curtis Elementary School
- Dishman Elementary School
- Fehl-Price Elementary School
- Fletcher Elementary School
- Guess Elementary School
- Homer Drive Elementary School
- Jones-Clark Elementary School
- Martin Elementary School
- Pietzsch-MacArthur Elementary School
- Regina-Howell Elementary School

=== Other programs ===
- Bingman Head Start
- Career and Technical Education Center
- Elementary DAEP
- Pathways Alternative Learning Center

=== Closed schools ===
In addition to former high schools, the district formerly operated the following elementary and middle schools:

- Dunbar Elementary (now Charlton-Pollard Elementary School)
- Bingman Elementary School (merged with Blanchette Elementary School, building now Bingman Head Start)
- Field Elementary (now BISD Annex Administration Building)
- French Elementary (reconstructed as Dr. Mae E. Jones Clark Elementary School)
- Ogden Elementary (now Pathways Alternative School)
- Southerland Head Start (demolished)
- Stephen F. Austin Middle School (merged with King Middle School)
- Central Medical Magnet High School (Closed due to damage from Hurricane Harvey, merged with Clifton J. Ozen High School)
- Clifton J. Ozen High School (merged with Central High School to create Beaumont United High School)
- King Middle School, closed in 2024 due to under-enrollment and a poor campus rating

== Student discipline ==
As of 2020 the district had a rate of 46 student suspensions per 100 students, the highest rate of any Texas school district, six times the Texas average, and significantly the largest of any Texas school district with at least 1,000 students.

== See also ==
- List of school districts in Texas
