= Jerry LeVias =

American football player (born 1946)

No. 23, 25
- Position: Wide receiver

Personal information
- Born: September 5, 1946 (age 80); Beaumont, Texas, U.S.
- Listed height: 5 ft 9 in (1.75 m)
- Listed weight: 177 lb (80 kg)

Career information
- High school: Hebert (Beaumont)
- College: SMU
- NFL draft: 1969: 2nd round, 40th overall pick

Career history
- Houston Oilers (1969-1970); San Diego Chargers (1971–1974)

Awards and highlights
- AFL All-Star (1969); Consensus All-American (1968); 3× First-team All-SWC (1966, 1967, 1968)

Career NFL/AFL statistics
- Receptions: 144
- Receiving yards: 2,139
- Receiving touchdowns: 14
- Return yards: 2,900
- Stats at Pro Football Reference
- College Football Hall of Fame

Jerry LeVias (born September 5, 1946) is an American former professional football player who was a wide receiver in the American Football League (AFL) and National Football League (NFL). He played college football for the SMU Mustangs. He played professionally in the AFL with the Houston Oilers and in the NFL with the Oilers and the San Diego Chargers. LeVias was the first African American scholarship athlete and second African American football player in the Southwest Conference.

== Early life ==
Born in Beaumont, Texas, LeVias played quarterback for the black Hebert High School there. LeVias was listed as 5'9" and 177 pounds (he actually measured closer to 5'7" and 140 pounds out of high school) but made up for his size with great speed.

== College career ==
He was recruited to Southern Methodist University in the spring of 1965 by Coach Hayden Fry. LeVias had over a hundred scholarship offers, but none from Grambling, Alcorn St., Southern, Prairie View, or any of the other traditional historically black college football powers he expected to play for. He was deemed too small by those schools to be offered a football scholarship. Coach Fry saw in LeVias the character, academic potential, and skill that would be needed to successfully integrate the Southwest Conference. LeVias had to first win over his freshman football teammates, and it became one of his biggest challenges for this civil rights pioneer. His success, on and off the field, led to a highly anticipated varsity debut in 1966; he quickly became one of the most exciting players in the nation, leading the Mustangs to a conference championship. His first year on the varsity squad LeVias led SMU to their first Cotton Bowl appearance since Heisman winner Doak Walker almost two decades earlier. LeVias's touchdowns against rivals Texas, Baylor, Texas A&M, and TCU saw the Mustangs earn the conference title in often dramatic fashion. Once LeVias demonstrated his ability on and off the field, Darrell Royal, head coach at conference power Texas, quipped that LeVias no longer looked too small. Speaking with LeVias' high school coach, Royal said, "Well, he didn't sound very big then when you described him, but he looks plenty big to me now." Texas had passed over LeVias, not only due to his size but because the Longhorns would not integrate their athletic teams until after being named consensus National Champions in 1969. LeVias wore the number 23 for Psalm 23, which he also wore during his professional career---at his grandmother's insistence.

In an interview with the Houston Chronicle, LeVias called his years at SMU "living hell" due to the abuse he received from opposing players and, to some extent, his own contemporaries; he stated that he would read the Serenity Prayer every morning. At that time, he was one of the few black students at SMU and Dallas itself was still not fully integrated. Despite the unconditional support from Fry, LeVias was still a frequent target and recalled that he once overheard an alumnus telling Fry that he would withdraw his support from the university if Fry continued playing LeVias.

LeVias was three times consensus All-SWC, 1966–68, and All-America as a senior. He twice led the league in receiving and held every career record when his three varsity seasons ended, including the single game mark for reception yardage (when he caught 8 passes for 213 yards against North Carolina State in 1968.) LeVias ended his career with a TD catch in SMU's scintillating victory over the Oklahoma Sooners in the 1968 Bluebonnet Bowl and followed it as the MVP of the Senior Bowl. On top of these achievements on the field, LeVias was an Academic All-American his senior year.

In his 1987 book, Richard Pennington told the story of the integration of the Southwest Conference, beginning with John Westbrook at Baylor and Jerry LeVias at SMU in 1966.

In 2008, HBO produced a documentary, "Breaking the Huddle: The Integration of College Football", which highlighted Coach Hayden Fry's and Jerry LeVias's struggles while they integrated the Southwest Conference. This struggle was placed amongst the context of other efforts across the nation to desegregate college football. The first African American to ever play in a football game in the SWC was John Hill Westbrook from Baylor University on September 10, 1966, vs. Syracuse University; LeVias's first game was a week later vs. Illinois.

== Professional career ==
LeVias played his first season (1969 with the American Football League's Houston Oilers, where he was selected to the 1969 AFL All-Star Team, then was with the NFL Oilers (1970) and San Diego Chargers (1971–1974).

LeVias was an immediate hit with the Oilers, as Sports Illustrated noted in their coverage of the successful pro football rookie class of 1969. In 1969 Levias lead the AFL with the league's longest pass reception (86 yards); he also lead the AFL that year in all-purpose yards (1,946 yards), punt return yardage (292 yards), and number of punts returned (35).

Prior to the start of the 1971 season, Levias was victimized by con man William Douglas Street Jr., who pretended to be Levias in order to briefly get onto a minor league baseball team, and later made several credit card purchase in Levias' name. The physicality of the pro game wore on LeVias, who famously remarked, "As the season progresses I get lighter, faster and more afraid." Well versed in avoiding the measuring tape as well as bigger defensive players, one scout claimed to have measured LeVias at 5'8", 163. The pro game eventually became unappealing to LeVias, who already prepared for life after football, working for the Conoco oil company and having a partnership in a Houston men's clothing store even while playing.

== Post-football ==
After his career ended, LeVias became a businessman. In 1971, he was one of 16 pro footballers given the keys to the city of Beaumont. He was inducted into the Texas Sports Hall of Fame in 1995 and to the College Football Hall of Fame in 2003.

LeVias married his long-time partner, Janice, in 2009.

He works with the Houston Texans as a Texans Ambassador.

== See also ==
- List of American Football League players
