= Tony Guillory =

American football player (1942–2021)

No. 88, 61
- Position: Linebacker

Personal information
- Born: November 10, 1942; Opelousas, Louisiana, U.S.
- Died: July 27, 2021 (aged 78); Beaumont, Texas, U.S.
- Listed height: 6 ft 4 in (1.93 m)
- Listed weight: 236 lb (107 kg)

Career information
- High school: Hebert (Beaumont, Texas)
- College: Nebraska; Lamar
- NFL draft: 1965: 7th round, 93rd overall pick
- AFL draft: 1965: 15th round, 114 (by the Houston Oilers)th overall pick

Career history
- Los Angeles Rams (1965, 1967–1968); Philadelphia Eagles (1969)

Career NFL statistics
- Games played: 53
- Games started: 23
- Stats at Pro Football Reference

Anthony Guillory (November 10, 1942 – July 27, 2021) was an American professional football linebacker who played in the National Football League (NFL) from 1965 through 1969. He attended the black Hebert High School in Beaumont, Texas, and played college football at the University of Nebraska and then at Lamar State College of Technology (now Lamar University). Transferring from Nebraska to Lamar in 1962, Guillory became the first black athlete at Lamar. He was one of 16 pro footballers given the keys to the city of Beaumont in 1971.

He died on July 27, 2021, in Beaumont, Texas, at age 78.
