= French High School =

Defunct public high school in Jefferson Country, Texas

Coordinates: 30.1170°N 94.1380°W

French High School was a public high school in Jefferson County, Texas in operation from 1913 to 1986. At the time of closure, it was operated by the Beaumont Independent School District, though it was initially operated by the French Independent School District. The school board voted to consolidate French High with Beaumont Charlton-Pollard High School into Central High School in 1986. Its namesake was John Jay French, a man who settled the Beaumont area. Its mascot was a buffalo, represented by Big Bills I and II. The school address was 4415 Concord Road, Beaumont, Texas

== Notable alumni ==
- Louie Kelcher, football player
- Billie Jo Spears, country music singer (graduated in 1955)
