= South Park High School (Beaumont, Texas) =

High school in Beaumont, Texas

Coordinates: 30.042647°N 94.084779°W

South Park High School was a senior high school in the South Park neighborhood of Beaumont, Texas, originally in the South Park Independent School District. In 1986 it was merged into West Brook Senior High School and the building became South Park Middle School.

== History ==
South Park High School served a neighborhood at the south end of Beaumont that expanded rapidly after oil was discovered nearby at Spindletop in 1901. A one-room schoolhouse opened in 1891–1892, and the first high-school class graduated in 1915. A new high school building was erected in 1922–1923 at 4500 Highland Avenue. South Park Junior College, which became Lamar University, was housed there from its founding until it moved to its own campus nearby in 1942. In 1986 the school was merged into West Brook Senior High School, which had been formed in 1982 as a desegregation measure by the merger of the district's other two high schools, Forest Park High School and Hebert High School; South Park and Forest Park were almost entirely white schools, while Hebert had been founded as a school for black students and remained black throughout its history.

The school building became South Park Middle School. In April 2010 it was demolished despite community opposition; there were advocates for keeping the building on the grounds it was historically significant, and the building was found to have been structurally safe. Patrick Michels of The Texas Observer wrote that in regards to the demolition "some saw [it] as a punishment for the white community". A new building opened in 2012.

== Athletics ==
South Park's athletic teams wore green and were the Greenies. They won two state basketball championships: Class 3A in 1953 under coach Bill Tipton and Class 4A in 1960 under coach Jimmy Anders.

== Notable alumni and staff ==
- Billy Baggett, college and professional football player
- Rear Adm. Cory Mendenhall U.S. Navy, skipper of USS Sculpin in WWII
- John E. Gray, student and later shop teacher: President of Lamar University
- Herman Hugg, teacher: artist
- Nick Lampson, student: US Congressman
- Clyde Littlefield, student: coach at the University of Texas
- Tex Ritter, student: singer and actor
- Paul Tyson, football coach
