= Forest Park High School (Beaumont, Texas) =

High school in Beaumont, Texas, United States

Forest Park High School in Beaumont was a senior high school on the west side of Beaumont, Texas, originally in the South Park Independent School District.

== History ==
Forest Park High School opened in September 1961 to serve the expanding west end of Beaumont; six years later, the wealthy school district replaced the campus. It and South Park High School were almost entirely white; in 1968, 3% of Forest Park's students were black, and in 1976, after a first federal order for the district to desegregate, 2%. Hebert High School, founded as a school for blacks, was entirely black in 1968 and had one white student in 1976. In 1982 federal judge Robert Parker mandated the merger of Forest Park and Hebert into a single integrated school, which students voted to name West Brook; initially, the Hebert campus housed the ninth and tenth grades, the Forest Park campus, the eleventh and twelfth. West Brook now operates entirely on the former Forest Park campus.

== Traditions ==
The school colors of Forest Park were blue and grey and the mascot was the Trojans. The bigger-than-life-size Trojan figure, carried around to rally fans, was named Egor.(King Harrell) The dance team was called the Tro-Janns. The Trojan Band, the cheerleaders, the twirlers, and the flags performed during sports events. Other traditions included Junior-Senior Prom, Senior Prom, Twirp Week & Dance, the Winter Ball, the Powder Puff football game, the Annual Play, Homecoming bonfire & dance, Trojan Games Day, and Skip Day. The school paper was called Populi Verbum.

One tradition from 1977 to 1980 was to yell the name "Sommers!" whenever the lights were dimmed for school assemblies. Another tradition was for Mark Fiorenza and the Senior Athletics Supporting Association, or SASA, to lead colorful cheers at basketball games. Nederland was especially fond of this tradition. They even invited a co-founder of SASA to visit their school and thank him for the previous game's hospitality at Trojan Gym. The "Field" was a popular place to relax and enjoy a Serv-o-mation coke and a bag of Nacho-flavored Doritos during the lunch hour. Another tradition was to trick "Big Bird" and sneak into the lunch line as she thought she was preventing people from cutting in line. Ninth-grade students were called Fish and were said to be adept at rolling peas across the cafeteria floor with their noses.

== Athletics ==
=== Football ===
In the 1970s, the Trojans played in District 21-4A. Member schools in the 1970s were Beaumont-Charlton Pollard High School, French High School, Forest Park, Nederland High School, Lincoln High School, Thomas Jefferson High School, Port Neches-Groves High School, Vidor High School, and West Orange-Stark High School. From 1920 to the present, teams from the schools which made up this district in the 1970s played in 15 state championship games and won 7 times, including the 1975 Port Neches-Groves Indians and the 1984 Beaumont French Buffaloes. In 1980 the Port Arthur Thomas Jefferson Yellow Jackets (now Port Arthur Memorial Titans) suffered a hard-fought loss in the State Championship game. All three of these games were against the Odessa Permian Panthers, another school from a Texas Oil Patch.

Forest Park did not win a 22-4A district championship in football but came close in 1979 with a record of 7 wins and 3 losses. 1979 was the first season the Trojans defeated the legendary Texas powerhouse program of the Port Neches - Groves Indians. The Summer 1979 prediction for this district in Texas Football Magazine stated, "It was a strange year in 22-AAAA last season - Port Neches-Grove did NOT win the district, Vidor did. Now that the monopoly has been broken, several schools - West Orange-Stark in particular - seem intent on making sure it remains broken. But, Vidor won't yield its crown without a struggle, and Forest Park has the people to stir up the dust, too." Returning starters named in the Forest Park paragraph following were quarterback Jay Burton and running back Trey Barclay on offense and Casey Bobb, Tommy Osborne and Dimitri Geeker on defense. The last graduating class of Forest Park, the Class of 1982, recorded the second, and final, victory of Forest Park over PNG. Paul Carswell, the head coach at Forest Park since the 1976 season, had been an assistant coach at PNG from the 1965 season through the 1975 season when the Indians won the Texas state championship under coach Doug Ethridge.

=== Basketball ===
Forest Park had a strong basketball program that included many winning teams. The 1979-1980 squad placed second in the first round of District play, finished the season 24–9, was the first Forest Park basketball team to score 100 or more points in a game, and won the Liberty Tournament. Members named to All-District or All-Tournament teams were Britt Birmingham, Kevin Cokinos, Ben Davis, Greg Reimer, and Tommy Tubbs. The team also included Tim Bailey.

=== Baseball ===
The Forest Park baseball team went to the Texas State 3A (at that time, the second largest classification) Finals in 1967 but lost to South San Antonio High School 3 to 0. In 1976, the team, led by pitcher Mike Barrett won District 22-4A and beat District 21-4A Port Arthur Thomas Jefferson in the bi-district playoffs. They lost to Texas City High School in the regional playoffs, two games to one.

Forest Park graduates who were drafted in Major League Baseball include Pitcher Billy Swope, 15th, by the Oakland Athletics in 1969, Pitcher John Binks, 12th, by the Boston Red Sox in 1970, and Pitcher Michael Barrett, 19th, by the Cincinnati Reds in 1976 .

=== Golf ===
The Forest Park boys golf teams produced Texas State Champions Bruce Lietzke in 1967 (3A) and Britt Harrison in 1975 (4A) and the Texas State Team Champions in 1968.

=== Cross Country ===
Coached by Ian Stewart, a native of England and a Lamar distance great , the Forest Park Cross Country team won every district championship from 1962 until the school's merger in 1982. Notable runners included John Heffner, who won an individual Southwest Conference Championship while at Texas A&M in 1966, and Chris Russell, the last Forest Park district champion in 1981. He also won district championships in 1979 and 1980 and went on to compete for Louisiana State University.

== Notable alumni ==
- Tim Beckman, college football coach
- Bruce Lietzke, professional golfer
- Steven McClintock, (Class of 1972) award winning songwriter and singer
- Allan Ritter (Class of 1972), member of the Texas House of Representatives since 1999 from Jefferson County

== See also ==
- Cooper High School (Abilene, Texas)
