= Woodside =

Woodside may refer to:

== Places and buildings ==
=== Australia ===
- Woodside, South Australia, a town
- Woodside, Victoria, a town

=== Canada ===
- Woodside National Historic Site, the boyhood home of William Lyon Mackenzie King
- Woodside, Nova Scotia, a neighborhood in Dartmouth, Nova Scotia
- Woodside, Kings County, Nova Scotia

=== India ===
- Woodside, in Ooty, Tamil Nadu, a home of botanist Thomas C. Jerdon

=== Ireland ===
- Woodside, Rathfarnham, a housing estate in Rathfarnham, Dublin

=== New Zealand ===
- Woodside, Wellington, a locality near Greytown in the Wairarapa
- Woodside, Otago, a locality near Moeraki in North Otago
- Woodside Glen, a locality near Outram, Otago

=== United Kingdom ===
- Woodside, Aberdeen, a district of Aberdeen
- Woodside, Dundee, a small housing scheme in Dundee
- Woodside, Bedfordshire, a hamlet near Luton
- Woodside, Berkshire (hamlet), a hamlet on the edge of Windsor Great Park
- Woodside, Old Windsor, an historic house near Old Windsor, Berkshire
- Woodside, Bradford, a district south of Buttershaw in Bradford, West Yorkshire
- Woodside, Ashton Hayes, a location in Cheshire
- Woodside, Wettenhall, a location in Cheshire
- Woodside, County Durham, a village in County Durham
- Woodside, Cumbria, a civil parish
- Woodside, Glenrothes, a district of Glenrothes, Fife
- Woodside, Glasgow, a district of Glasgow
- Woodside, London, a neighbourhood in the London Borough of Croydon, South London
  - Woodside (Croydon ward), an electoral ward of the Croydon London Borough Council
- Woodside (Haringey ward), an electoral ward of the Haringey London Borough Council
- Woodside, Merseyside, a district of Birkenhead, Wirral
- Woodside, Paisley, a district of Paisley
- Woodside Estate, an industrial estate in Dunstable, Bedfordshire
- Woodside, Telford, a suburb
- Woodside, Dudley, an area of Dudley, West Midlands
- Woodside, a district of Horsforth, West Yorkshire
- Woodside, Perth and Kinross, a village in Perthshire
- Woodside, County Tyrone, a townland in County Tyrone, Northern Ireland, see list of townlands of County Tyrone
- Woodside Park, Barnet, a suburb of north London
- Woodside Stadium, a multi-purpose stadium in Watford, Hertfordshire

=== United States ===
- Woodside (Belle Mina, Alabama), a historic residence
- Woodside, California, a small incorporated town in San Mateo County, California
- Woodside Store, Woodside, California
- Woodside, Delaware, a town in Kent County, Delaware
- Woodside (Mt. Pleasant, Delaware), a historic home
- Woodside Methodist Episcopal Church, Woodside, Delaware
- Woodside Township, Sangamon County, Illinois
- Woodside (Marion, Indiana), a home designed by architect Frank Lloyd Wright
- Woodside/John T. Bate House, Louisville, Kentucky; listed on the National Register of Historic Places in Jefferson County, Kentucky
- Woodside (Clinton, Louisiana), listed on the National Register of Historic Places in East Feliciana Parish, Louisiana
- Woodside (Abingdon, Maryland), a historic home
- Woodside (Silver Spring, Maryland), a neighborhood
- Woodside Township, Otter Tail County, Minnesota
- Woodside Township, Polk County, Minnesota
- Woodside, Missouri, an unincorporated community
- Woodside, Newark, New Jersey
- Woodside Presbyterian Church, a historic church in Troy, New York
- Woodside, Queens, a neighborhood in the borough of Queens, New York City
  - 61st Street–Woodside (IRT Flushing Line)
  - Woodside station (LIRR)
- Woodside (Lincolnton, North Carolina), a historic plantation home
- Woodside (Milton, North Carolina), a historic plantation home
- Woodside, Ohio, an unincorporated community
- Woodside, Pennsylvania, a census-designated place in Bucks County, Pennsylvania
- Woodside, Utah, a ghost town
- Woodside (Buckingham, Virginia), a historic plantation home
- Woodside (Delaplane, Virginia), a historic home
- Woodside (Tuckahoe, Virginia), a villa in Henrico County, Virginia

== Other uses ==
- Woodside (surname)
- Woodside Energy, an Australian company

== See also ==
- Woodside Park (disambiguation)
- Woodside School (disambiguation)
- Woodside station (disambiguation)
