= Woodside Township =

Woodside Township may refer to the following townships in the United States:

- Woodside Township, Sangamon County, Illinois
- Woodside Township, Otter Tail County, Minnesota
- Woodside Township, Polk County, Minnesota
- Woodside Township, New Jersey
