= Woodside (surname) =

Woodside is a surname. Notable persons with that name include:

- Arch G. Woodside (born 1943), American marketing author, consultant, and professor
- Ben Woodside (born 1985), American basketball player
- Brad Woodside (born 1948), Canadian politician
- D. B. Woodside (born 1969), American actor
- Dennis Woodside (born 1969), American business executive
- Henry Joseph Woodside (1858–1929), Canadian businessman, journalist, writer, and photographer
- Keith Woodside (born 1964), American football player
- Logan Woodside (born 1995), American football player
- Lyndon Woodside (1935–2005), American conductor
- Matt Woodside, American politician
- Maxine Woodside (born 1948), Mexican radio and television host
- Paul Woodside (born 1963), American football player
- Robert E. Woodside (1904–1998), American politician and judge
- Willson Woodside (1905–1991), Canadian journalist
