= Woodside Township, Minnesota =

Woodside Township is the name of some places in the U.S. state of Minnesota:

- Woodside Township, Otter Tail County, Minnesota
- Woodside Township, Polk County, Minnesota
