= Paper Lion (film) =

1968 film by Alex March

- Theatrical release poster
- Directed by: Alex March
- Screenplay by: Lawrence Roman
- Based on: Paper Lion by George Plimpton
- Produced by: Stuart Millar
- Starring: Alan Alda; Lauren Hutton; Joe Schmidt; Vince Lombardi; Alex Karras; John Gordy; Mike Lucci; Pat Studstill; Roger Brown; Karl Sweetan
- Cinematography: Morris Hartzband; Peter Garbarini
- Edited by: Louis San Andres; John Carter; Sidney Katz
- Music by: Roger Kellaway
- Distributed by: United Artists
- Release date: October 14, 1968
- Running time: 107 minutes
- Country: United States
- Language: English
- Box office: $1.7 million (rentals)

Paper Lion is a 1968 sports comedy film starring Alan Alda as writer George Plimpton, based on Plimpton's 1966 nonfiction book of the same name depicting his tryout with the Detroit Lions of the National Football League. The film premiered in Detroit on October 2, 1968, and was released nationwide the week of October 14, 1968.

== Plot ==
George Plimpton, a writer for Sports Illustrated, has been indulging in a variety of Walter Mitty-like whims and stunts, trying his hand at being a professional athlete (such as briefly pitching in an exhibition game against All-Star baseball players or boxing a round with Sugar Ray Robinson), then writing about the experience.

During a game of touch football, his editor gets an idea that Plimpton should try going to a professional football team's training camp as a player. The Detroit Lions agree.

Plimpton attempts to disguise the fact that he is a total amateur, but Lions players can see the truth. He is unwelcome to some who resent the intrusion, but star player Alex Karras intervenes on his behalf.

In practice, Plimpton demonstrates his ineptitude and gets knocked around. But he is a good sport and never complains, which most of his teammates appreciate. At one point, he scores a touchdown in practice and is pleased with himself, until catching the other Lions laughing because they let him score.

With a relatively meaningless pre-season exhibition game scheduled against the St. Louis Cardinals, the Lions' head coach, Joe Schmidt, decides to let George play quarterback for one series of downs. George is sacked for losses, does very little right, and runs into a goal post, knocking himself cold. Film from the September 8, 1967, preseason game between the Lions and Cardinals is used.

But at least he gets a good story out of it, which he goes back to New York City to write.

== Cast ==
- Alan Alda as George Plimpton
- Lauren Hutton as Kate
- David Doyle as Oscar
- Roy Scheider as Central Park Flag Football Player
- Joe Schmidt as Himself
- Alex Karras as Himself
- John Gordy as Himself
- Mike Lucci as Himself
- Sugar Ray Robinson as Himself
- Pat Studstill as Himself
- Roger Brown as Himself
- Frank Gifford as Himself
- Vince Lombardi as Himself
- George Wilson as Himself
- Lem Barney as Himself
- Garo Yepremian as Himself

== Differences from book ==
There are major differences between the book and the film, mostly attributable to the producers moving the time period up to 1967. Despite the late 1968 release, its filming features the 1967 Lions—and does not attempt to re-create the time period of the book, which is 1963. Joe Schmidt, still an active player in 1963, is the Lions' head coach in the film. Defensive tackle Alex Karras was serving a suspension from pro-football in 1963 for gambling and was not at the training camp. He is one of Plimpton's main supporters in the film.

In the book, Plimpton only plays in an intra-squad scrimmage, where he loses yardage on five straight plays. In the film, Plimpton does well in the scrimmage and scores a touchdown, only to realize shortly afterward that the defense did not give it their all and let him score.

The film depicts five plays when Plimpton is permitted to quarterback the Lions in a fictitious pre-season game with the St. Louis Cardinals. There is a scene where Plimpton meets with Green Bay Packers coach Vince Lombardi, who informs him that he will not be attending the Packers training camp. Plimpton never wrote about any meeting with Lombardi.

== Reception ==
Film critic Roger Ebert gave the film three stars of a possible four, writing, "I don't know what to make of 'Paper Lion' as a movie — it will not be immortal, I guess — but as wish fulfillment, it's crackerjack."

In a 2012 piece in The New Yorker, written upon the release of the documentary Plimpton! Starring George Plimpton as Himself, Plimpton's son Taylor criticized Alda's performance. "Alda's version was always angry or consternated, like a character in a Woody Allen film, while my dad, though he certainly faced hurdles as an amateur in the world of the professional, bore his humiliations with a comic lightness and charm — much of which emanated from that befuddled, self-deprecating professor's voice."

== See also ==
- List of American films of 1968
- List of American football films
