= Hardcase (film) =

1972 TV film

- Genre: Western
- Written by: Harold Jack Bloom; Sam Rolfe
- Directed by: John Llewellyn Moxey
- Starring: Clint Walker
- Theme music composer: Patrick Williams
- Country of origin: United States
- Original language: English

Production
- Executive producers: William Hanna; Joseph Barbera
- Producer: Matthew Rapf
- Cinematography: Roberto Solano; Rosalío Solano
- Editors: Stanley Frazen; John Loeffler; Michael Pozen
- Running time: 74 minutes
- Production company: Hanna-Barbera Productions

Original release
- Network: ABC
- Release: February 1, 1972

Hardcase is a 1972 American Western television film directed by John Llewellyn Moxey and starring Clint Walker. It is the first fully live-action feature film produced by Hanna-Barbera Productions. The movie appeared on the ABC Movie of the Week on February 1, 1972, where it was a ratings surprise, becoming the seventh most popular show of the week.

== Plot ==
Jack Rutherford has returned to his ranch in Texas after soldiering in the Spanish–American War. Because he was presumed dead, his wife Rozaline remarried a Mexican revolutionary leader named Simon Fuegus. Rozaline also sold Jack's ranch and belongings to buy weapons for Simon's band. Jack travels to Mexico to get his share of the proceeds of the sale but gets nothing. Taking matters into his own hands, Jack decides to raise income by kidnapping Simon for $10,000 ransom to be paid either by Simon's band or the Mexican Federal Government who wish to get their hands on Simon.

== Cast ==
- Clint Walker as Jack Rutherford
- Stefanie Powers as Rozaline Rutherford
- Pedro Armendáriz Jr. as Simon Fuegus
- Alex Karras as Booker Llewellyn
- E. Lopez Rojas as Felipe
- Luis Mirando as Maj. Tovar
- Martin LaSalle as Luis Camacho

== Production ==
In 1967, Hanna-Barbera was acquired by Taft Broadcasting. Iwao Takamoto recalled that Taft was thinking of getting rid of their animation operations with Joe Barbera using the opportunity for the studio to begin live action feature film productions. The film was shot in Mexico and was the feature film debut of Alex Karras as a fictional character (he previously appeared as himself in the 1968 film Paper Lion). Hal Needham was stunt coordinator on the film.

== See also ==
- List of American films of 1972
