= P. J. Alexander =

American football player (born 1978)

No. 69, 64
- Position: Center

Personal information
- Born: December 23, 1978 (age 47); Springfield, Massachusetts, U.S.
- Listed height: 6 ft 4 in (1.93 m)
- Listed weight: 297 lb (135 kg)

Career information
- High school: Lincoln (Tallahassee, Florida)
- College: Syracuse
- NFL draft: 2002: undrafted

Career history
- New Orleans Saints (2002–2003); Denver Broncos (2003–2005); Atlanta Falcons (2006); Denver Broncos (2007); Florida Tuskers (2009); Omaha Nighthawks (2010)

Awards and highlights
- Second-team All-Big East (2001)

Career NFL statistics
- Games played: 20
- Games started: 4
- Stats at Pro Football Reference

Patrick James Alexander (born December 23, 1978) is an American former professional football player who was a center in the National Football League (NFL). He played college football for the Syracuse Orange before being signed by the New Orleans Saints as an undrafted free agent in 2002.

Alexander also played for the Denver Broncos, Atlanta Falcons, Florida Tuskers and Omaha Nighthawks.

== College career ==
Alexander played for four seasons at Syracuse University, where he started 23 games at left tackle in his final two years.

== Professional career ==
=== Denver Broncos ===
Alexander played for the Denver Broncos in 2005, and was subsequently waived, and his attempts to make the team was chronicled in Stefan Fatsis's book A Few Seconds of Panic.

=== Atlanta Falcons ===
In 2006, Alexander joined the Atlanta Falcons, and made his first career start after two offensive linemen were hurt and suspended. However, the following week after the Baltimore Ravens game, Alexander lost his starting job, and was waived in 2007.

=== Second stint with Broncos ===
In 2007, after injuries to Tom Nalen and Ben Hamilton, Alexander rejoined the Broncos.

=== Florida Tuskers ===
On August 17, 2009, Alexander was signed by the Florida Tuskers of the United Football League.

=== Omaha Nighthawks ===
Alexander played for the Omaha Nighthawks in 2010.
