= Alex Karras =

American football player, sportscaster and actor (1935–2012)

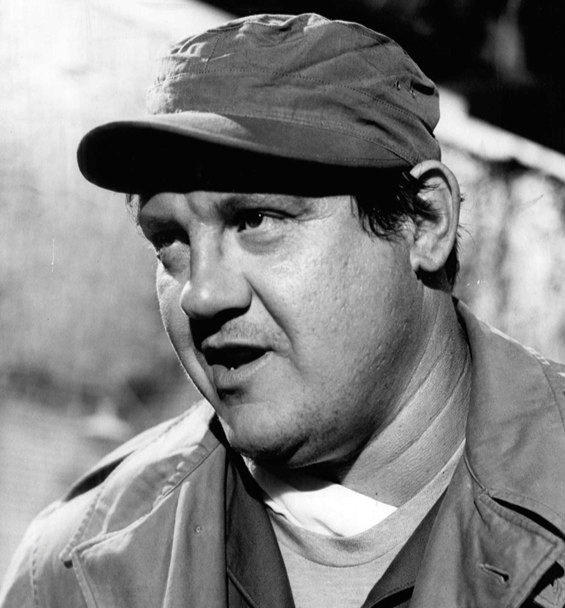
- Karras in M*A*S*H, 1974

No. 71
- Position: Defensive tackle

Personal information
- Born: July 15, 1935; Gary, Indiana, U.S.
- Died: October 10, 2012 (aged 77); Los Angeles, California, U.S.
- Listed height: 6 ft 2 in (1.88 m)
- Listed weight: 248 lb (112 kg)

Career information
- High school: Emerson (Gary)
- College: Iowa (1955–1957)
- NFL draft: 1958: 1st round, 10th overall pick

Career history
- Detroit Lions (1958–1962; 1964–1970)

Awards and highlights
- 3× First-team All-Pro (1960, 1961, 1965); 6× Second-team All-Pro (1962, 1964, 1966–1969); 4× Pro Bowl (1960–1962, 1965); NFL 1960s All-Decade team; Pride of the Lions; Detroit Lions 75th Anniversary Team; Detroit Lions All-Time Team; Outland Trophy (1957); UPI Lineman of the Year (1957); Consensus All-American (1957); First-team All-American (1956); 2× First-team All-Big Ten (1956, 1957)

Career NFL statistics
- Fumble recoveries: 18
- Interceptions: 4
- Sacks: 100.0
- Stats at Pro Football Reference
- Pro Football Hall of Fame
- College Football Hall of Fame

Alexander George Karras (July 15, 1935 – October 10, 2012) was an American professional football player, professional wrestler, sportscaster, and actor. He was a four-time Pro Bowl selection while playing defensive tackle for the Detroit Lions of the National Football League (NFL) from 1958 to 1970. He is a member of the College Football Hall of Fame and was elected to the Pro Football Hall of Fame in the Centennial class.

As an actor, Karras played Mongo in the 1974 comedy film Blazing Saddles. He starred as George Papadopolis, the adoptive father of Webster Long (Emmanuel Lewis), in the ABC sitcom Webster (1983–1989) alongside his wife Susan Clark. Karras also had a prominent role in Victor/Victoria, starring Julie Andrews and James Garner.

== Early life ==
Karras was born and raised in Gary, Indiana, the son of Dr. George Karras, a Greek immigrant from Chios. A graduate of the University of Chicago, George studied medicine in Canada, where met and married Emmeline (née Wilson), a native-born registered nurse. George opened a medical practice in Gary, but died when Alex was thirteen years old. By that time, Alex Karras had learned to play football in a parking lot near his home, with and against his athletically inclined brothers. Excelling at high school football, baseball, track, wrestling, and basketball, he blossomed into a four-time Indiana all-state selection at Gary's Emerson High School. Karras also excelled in numerous other sports in high He graduated in 1954.

== College career ==
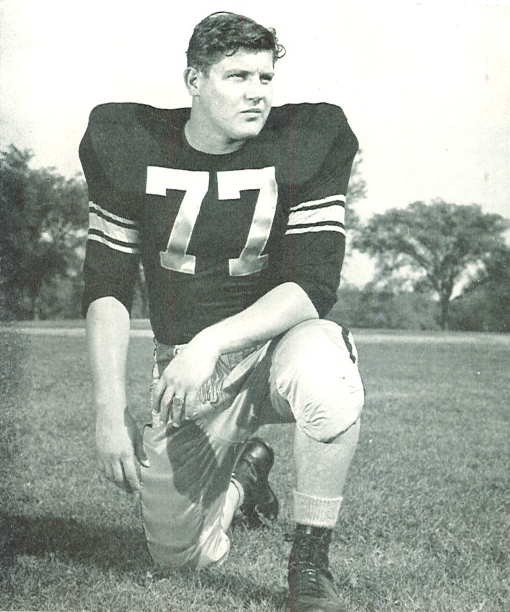
Karras from 1958 Hawkeye

Karras' older brothers Lou and Ted played college football. Lou (a future member of the Redskins) at Purdue, and Ted (who later played with the Bears and Lions) also at Purdue before transferring to Indiana. Because of Ted's move Alex maintained that "Indiana had the inside track" on recruiting him. Shortly after he graduated from high school, three coaches from the Iowa Hawkeyes met Karras at his brother Lou's house with an airplane and flew him to Spencer, Iowa, where he remained incommunicado through the summer. Writing in the Detroit Free Press in 1971, Karras said that "nobody knew where I was, not even my mom, although Louie told her not to worry. Obviously, Iowa came up with something, I have no intention of stirring up any mess. I'll only say that, as Louie explained it, some accommodations were made by the people at Iowa that would make things easier for the family, and so away I went. It was the beginning of some awful years."

Initially, Karras struggled at Iowa with classwork, homesickness, and with his coach, Forest Evashevski. He was a pledge at Sigma Nu fraternity as a freshman. Karras probably would have left Iowa had he not befriended a Greek theater owner, Ernie Pannos, as well as fellow players Cal Jones and Bob Commings. Karras's sophomore year with Iowa in 1955 got off to a rocky start when he showed up for practice forty pounds (18 kg) overweight.

Karras had been (dubiously) advised that year that he would need to gain substantial weight to have a chance at success in pro football, prompting him to report to camp at 260–270 pounds, in contrast to the 225–230 the Iowa coaching staff had expected.

Karras was also hampered that season by a fractured anklebone. After being disappointed at not getting to play in the season finale, Karras threw a shoe at Evashevski and quit the team. Karras did not earn a football letter for the 1955 season.

Karras went to summer classes, lost the excess weight, and rejoined the football team, but a strained relationship resurfaced. Evashevski promised to start Karras in the 1956 season opener against Indiana, when he would square off against his brother, Ted.

But Evashevski played Karras off the bench instead, and Karras quit the team again. This time, Karras agreed to return only after making Evashevski promise he would not talk to him other than in a coaching capacity. (Evashevski always denied any special agreement with Karras.) Iowa took the lead in the 1956 Big Ten title race with a 7–0 victory over Minnesota. The Hawkeyes then clinched the Big Ten title and Iowa's first-ever Rose Bowl berth by defeating Ohio State 6–0. Karras sealed the game with a sack on the game's final play.

Iowa's final regular-season game in 1956 was a 48–8 win at home over a struggling Notre Dame team. Karras called it his biggest college win, saying, "The Karrases have always had a rivalry with Notre Dame. The school was just sixty miles (97 km) down the road from our home and we wanted to beat 'em at anything." However, after the game, Karras got into a physical altercation with Evashevski. Karras did not enjoy his trip to the Rose Bowl, either. "Pasadena was the most boring town I've ever been in," said Karras. Karras helped the Hawkeyes best Oregon State, 35–19. He was a first-team All-American in 1956.

Karras spent the summer of 1957 with an American track team of Greek descent. He participated in the shot put, throwing a respectable 52 feet (16 m). In his senior season in 1957, Karras was the most dominant lineman in the nation, won the Outland Trophy, and was the runner-up in the voting for the Heisman Trophy. Karras, Ohio State tackle John Hicks (in 1973), and Aidan Hutchinson, a Michigan edge rusher (2021), are three of only four linemen to finish so high in the Heisman Trophy voting. (Leon Hart, a Notre Dame end, was the only lineman ever to win the Heisman Trophy, in 1949.) In addition, Karras was a consensus first-team All-American in 1957. Hawkeye teammate Randy Duncan said:

Karras hated Evashevski, and he still does. I think Karras hated Evy for a lot of reasons. Evy was on everybody's back, and he was on Karras' back big time. Karras was a great football player, but he didn't really like offense and, in those days, you had to go both ways. So he didn't block anybody. What he wanted to do was chase down quarterbacks and play defense.

== Professional football ==
Before his NFL career got underway, Karras signed a contract as a professional wrestler on December 13, 1957, earning $25,000 during the six-month off-season. Karras was the tenth selection of the 1958 NFL draft, taken by the Detroit Lions. He signed with the Lions, spurning an offer from the Canadian Football League's Winnipeg Blue Bombers. He quickly became one of the dominant defensive tackles in the NFL, playing for 12 seasons (1958–1962, 1964–1970) all with the Lions.

As a rookie in 1958, joining the championship-contending Lions, Karras was adopted in training camp as an off-field flunky, chauffeur, and wingman by superstar quarterback Bobby Layne for his legendary late-night party activities.

By many accounts Karras would marvel at Layne's ability to recover from heavy drinking sessions at night and being able to function effectively at practices or games the next day. Karras himself admitted he was frequently heavily hung over as a result of late night bar-hopping.

Layne was traded to the Pittsburgh Steelers early in the 1958 season and Karras eventually assumed a veteran leadership position himself.

On January 7, 1963, Karras's ownership share in Detroit's Lindell AC Bar became a source of controversy when league officials urged him to sell his financial interests in the place because of reports of gambling and organized crime influence.

After first threatening to retire rather than give up the bar ownership, Karras admitted placing bets on NFL games and was suspended by the league, along with Green Bay Packers running back Paul Hornung, for one season (1963). During his exile, Karras returned to pro wrestling, taking on such memorable characters as Dick the Bruiser. He was reinstated, along with Hornung, on March 16, 1964, by NFL commissioner Pete Rozelle. Upon returning to action in 1964, Karras once refused when an official asked him to call the pregame coin toss. "I'm sorry, sir," Karras replied. "I'm not permitted to gamble." During his first year back, player discontent with head coach George Wilson resulted in Karras asking to be traded. However, the Lions settled the issue when they fired Wilson after the season.

From 1960 to 1966, except for his suspension in 1963, he played next to Roger Brown, forming a formidable pair of defensive tackles, until Brown was traded to the Los Angeles Rams. After another season of controversy under new head coach Harry Gilmer, Karras was rumored to be ready to play out his option and sign with the expansion Miami Dolphins of the American Football League under his former coach Wilson. Instead, Karras signed a seven-year contract with the Lions on May 20, 1966, with Wilson stating that Karras had used the threat of signing with Miami to garner a large deal with Detroit. Despite the new contract, controversy remained, as Karras and Gilmer sparred in midseason, with the coach reportedly ready to release the veteran defensive tackle. As before, it would be the coach who would depart, with Karras's former teammate Joe Schmidt taking over for Gilmer. On June 4, 1967, Karras once again hinted he would retire to work at a new business venture; once training camp began, though, Karras was back with the Lions. During that preseason, he jokingly commented that he would walk back from Denver if the AFL Broncos defeated the Lions. When it actually happened, Karras backtracked and flew home on the team plane. He was still an All-Pro selection from 1967 to 1969. Despite not allowing a touchdown in the divisional round of the 1970 NFL playoffs, the Lions lost to the Dallas Cowboys 5–0, his first playoff game and his final game. After the 1971 preseason, while rehabilitating a knee injury suffered the previous year, Karras was released in mid-September, ending his playing career at age 36.

From 1958 to 1970, the Lions were over .500 in six of the 13 years, making the playoffs only once, in 1970, with a 10–4 record in Karras's final year. Aside from 1970, their best years were 1962 (11–3) and 1969 (9–4–1). In 1962, the Lion defense allowed 177 points (12.6 points/game), 188 (13.4 ppg) in 1969, and 202 (14.4 ppg) in 1970; for all three years they were second-least in the NFL, thanks in large part to a tough and rugged defensive line led by Karras. He was called an "iron man" and also nicknamed "Twinkletoes" by his fans, and missed only one game due to injury in his 12 NFL seasons and his 161 games played are the fifteenth-most in Lions history. He made the Pro Bowl four times, and the Hall of Fame named him a member of the 1960s All-Decade team. The Professional Football Researchers Association named Karras to the PRFA Hall of Very Good Class of 2006.

On January 15, 2020, Karras was elected to the Pro Football Hall of Fame, as a member of the Centennial Slate, honoring the NFL's 100th anniversary.

== Film and television ==
Karras's sense of humor came to the attention of writer George Plimpton, who heard many stories about Karras while training with the Lions for his book Paper Lion during the summer of 1963.

When the film version of the book was made in 1968, Karras made his film debut playing himself.

Following his release by the Lions in 1971, he made several appearances on The Tonight Show Starring Johnny Carson and also played a bit part in The Mary Tyler Moore Show, appearing in the farewell party scene where Rhoda moves back to New York. Karras soon began acting on a full-time basis, playing a Tennessee boy turned Olympic weightlifter named Hugh Ray Feather in 1973's The 500 Pound Jerk. He played a hulking villain who menaced Clint Walker in the ABC TV film Hardcase. A minor but memorable role came one year later in the western parody Blazing Saddles (1974): the very strong and slow-witted thug Mongo. In 1974, he also played the part of Lyle, a Marine saved by Hawkeye Pierce in M*A*S*H. That same year, he was quickly brought in by ABC in September to replace fellow Gary, Indiana native Fred Williamson (who had replaced Don Meredith) as a commentator for Monday Night Football. He served three years in that role until leaving after the 1976 season, with his most memorable comment coming in his first game, when he joked that bald Oakland Raiders lineman Otis Sistrunk, who never attended college, was from "the University of Mars", after seeing steam coming off his head.

In 1972, Karras hosted a local weekly football program for Windsor, Ontario, CBC affiliate CKLW-TV, The Alex Karras Football Show; his program generally preceded the CBC's Wednesday night CFL telecasts. In 1973, Karras made several cameo appearances on the January 8 broadcast of Rowan and Martin's Laugh-In.

Karras returned to acting with roles that included playing Sheriff Wallace in Porky's (in which his wife, Susan Clark, also starred), and as western settler Hans Brumbaugh in Centennial. He played James Garner's closeted gay bodyguard in the 1982 Blake Edwards film Victor/Victoria. Karras played a darker role as Hank Sully, the right-hand man of villain Jake Wise (played by James Woods) in the 1984 film Against All Odds.

In 1975, Karras appeared on MNF colleague Howard Cosell's ill-fated variety show Saturday Night Live with Howard Cosell wearing a wig (a la Mongo) and performing "Already Gone" on the beach with The Eagles who were dubbed the "Alex Karras Blues Band" due to t-shirts the band members wore bearing that moniker. Karras later hosted NBC's Saturday Night Live in 1985.

Karras's television appearances included guest roles on Daniel Boone in the episode "The Cache", M*A*S*H in the episode "Springtime", The Odd Couple, and a brief run on Match Game '75. He also signed on to play the character "Super Jock" in commercials for a line of sports action toys named Super Jock, produced by Schaper (1975). In 1977, he was cast in the lead of the TV movie Mad Bull.

In 1979, he had the role of Hans "Potato" Brumbaugh, a potato farmer, on the TV miniseries Centennial. He was known for his humorous endorsement of La-Z-Boy recliners, in an ad campaign which also featured NFL greats such as Miami Dolphins Coach Don Shula, and New York Jets legend Joe Namath. In the 1980s, Karras had memorable success in the TV sitcom Webster, playing George Papadapolis, the title character's (Emmanuel Lewis) adoptive father, in a role that showcased his softer side. His real-life wife, Susan Clark, played his fictional wife in the series; Karras and Clark produced the series through their Georgian Bay Entertainment production company. The two met in 1975 while filming the made-for-television biopic Babe for CBS.

== Writing ==
Besides being one of the subjects of George Plimpton's nonfiction book Paper Lion (published in 1966), he was one of the two principal subjects of Plimpton's follow-up book, Mad Ducks and Bears (1973), in which fellow Detroit Lion John Gordy was the "bear" to Karras's "mad duck". Karras named one of his sons after Plimpton. During his last years as a Detroit Lion, Karras wrote a journal of his experiences that was published in the Detroit Free Press. He subsequently wrote a memoir, Even Big Guys Cry (1978), and a novel, Tuesday Night Football (1991).

== Honors ==
In conjunction with the 100 Years of Hawkeye Football celebration in 1989, Iowa Hawkeye fans selected an all-time team. The squad featured 11 players on offense and defense, two kickers, and 15 special-mention players who received strong fan support. Karras was voted to the team as a defensive lineman. He was elected to the Iowa Sports Hall of Fame in 1977 and the College Football Hall of Fame in 1991.

On December 12, 2014, the Big Ten Network included Karras on "The Mount Rushmore of Iowa Football", as chosen by online fan voting. Karras was joined in the honor by Nile Kinnick, Chuck Long, and Tim Dwight.

On October 28, 2018, the Detroit Lions enshrined Karras in the franchise ring of honor along with former Detroit Lions Herman Moore and Roger Brown.

On January 15, 2020, the NFL announced that Karras had been elected to the Pro Football Hall of Fame as part of the Centennial Slate, honoring the league's 100th anniversary.

== Later activities ==
Karras also worked briefly as a football coach in 2007 and 2008. He worked for the SIL as an assistant coach to Bob Lombardi. He owned an ice cream parlor in Surfside Beach, South Carolina, called The Cow.

== Personal life ==
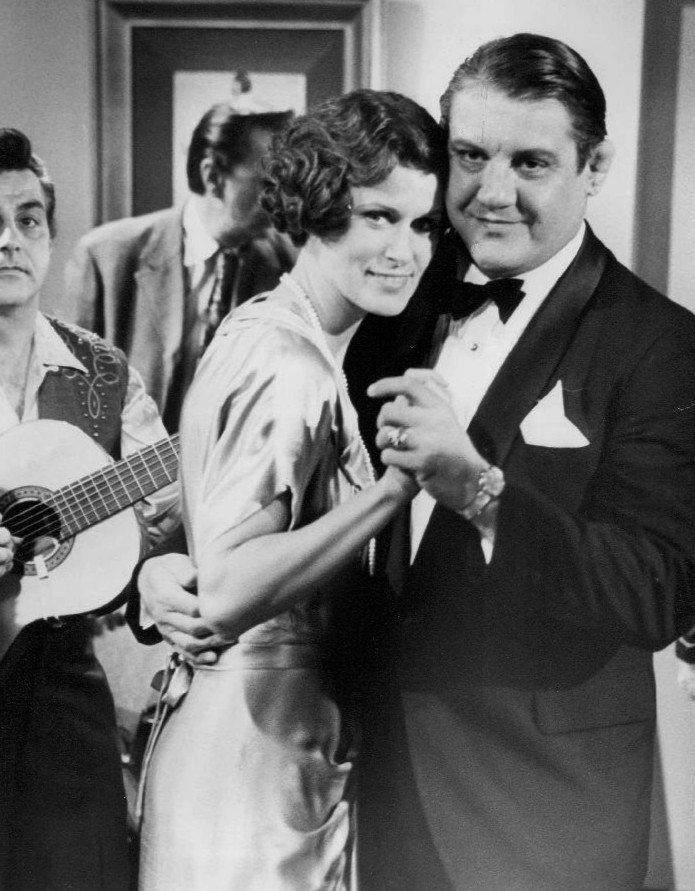
Susan Clark and Karras in Babe (1975)

Karras was married twice. In 1958, he married Joan Jurgensen, with whom he had five children. The marriage ended in divorce in 1975. He married actress Susan Clark on March 21, 1980, and they had a daughter together.

== Illness and death ==
In his later years, Karras suffered from dementia, heart disease, and cancer.

Karras was among 3,500 former NFL players who filed lawsuits against the NFL in early 2012, over the long-term damage caused by concussions and repeated hits to the head.

On October 8, 2012, it was revealed by friend Tom McInerney that Karras had been diagnosed with kidney failure. He was treated at the Saint John's Health Center in Santa Monica, California, before being released into hospice care. After returning to his Los Angeles home with family, Karras died on the morning of October 10.

== Filmography ==
Year	Title	Role	Notes
1968	Paper Lion	Himself	
1972	Hardcase	Booker Llewellyn	
1973	The 500 Pound Jerk	Hughie Rae Feather	
1973	The Odd Couple	Jake Metcalf	
1974	Blazing Saddles	Mongo	
1974	The Great Lester Boggs	Sheriff Billy Bob	
1974	M*A*S*H	Lance Corporal Lyle Wesson	
1974	Win, Place or Steal	Frank	
1975	Babe	George Zaharias	
1977	Mad Bull	Iago "Mad Bull" Karkus	TV movie
1978	FM	Doc Holliday	
1978	Jacob Two-Two Meets the Hooded Fang	The Hooded Fang	
1978	Centennial	Hans Brumbaugh	TV miniseries, 12 episodes
1980	When Time Ran Out	"Tiny" Baker	
1980	Alcatraz: The Whole Shocking Story	E.J. "Jughead" Miller	
1981	Nobody's Perfekt	Swaboda	
1981	Porky's	Sheriff Wallace	
1982	Victor/Victoria	"Squash" Bernstein	
1983–1987	Webster	George Papadopolis	
1984	Against All Odds	Hank Sully	
1994	Street Corner Kids	Floyd Powell	
1995	Fudge-a-Mania	Big A	TV movie; considered the pilot for the TV series Fudge
1996	Tracey Takes On...	Himself	Episode: "Fame"
1998	Buffalo '66	TV Sportscaster	

== See also ==
- List of gridiron football players who became professional wrestlers

== Footnotes ==
Media offices
Preceded by Don Meredith	Monday Night Football color commentator 1974–1976 (with Howard Cosell)	Succeeded by Don Meredith
