= Sidd Finch =

Fictional English baseball player

- Created by: George Plimpton

In-universe information
- Full name: Hayden Siddhartha Finch
- Position: Pitcher
- Origin: England

Sidd Finch

New York Mets – No. 21
- Pitcher
- Born: England
- Bats: Right Throws: Right

Sidd Finch is a fictional baseball player, the subject of the notorious April Fools' Day hoax article "The Curious Case of Sidd Finch" written by George Plimpton and first published in the April 1, 1985, issue of Sports Illustrated. According to Plimpton, Finch was raised in an English orphanage, learned yoga in Tibet, and could throw a fastball as fast as 168 miles per hour (270 km/h).

== Hoax ==
In early 1985, Mark Mulvoy, the managing editor of Sports Illustrated, noticed that a cover date that year would fall on April 1. He asked George Plimpton to commemorate this with an article on April Fools' Day jokes in sports. When Plimpton found himself unable to find enough examples to craft an article, Mulvoy gave Plimpton permission to create his own hoax.

Plimpton reported that Hayden Siddhartha "Sidd" Finch was a rookie baseball pitcher in training with the New York Mets after being discovered in Old Orchard Beach, Maine. He also wore only one shoe—a heavy hiker's boot—when pitching. Finch, who had never played baseball before, was attempting to decide between a sports career and one playing the French horn. What was astonishing about Finch was that he could pitch a fastball at an amazing 168 miles per hour (270 km/h), far above the record of a "mere" 104 miles per hour (167 km/h), with pinpoint accuracy, and without needing to warm up. The Mets' scouting report gave Finch a "9" on fastball velocity and control—"8" is the highest score on the scale.

According to Plimpton, Finch grew up in an English orphanage and was adopted by an archaeologist who later died in a plane crash in Nepal. After briefly attending Harvard University, he went to Tibet to learn "yogic mastery of mind-body" under "the great poet-saint Lama Milaraspa", which was the source of his pitching prowess. Finch decided not to pursue a baseball career, instead choosing to "play the French horn or golf or something."

The story was accompanied by photographs of Finch, including one featuring a young Lenny Dykstra and another of Finch talking with the Mets' actual pitching coach, Mel Stottlemyre. The Mets played along with the hoax, even providing a uniform and number (21) for Finch.

Sports Illustrated photographer Lane Stewart recruited his friend, Joe Berton, who was a junior high art teacher from Oak Park, Illinois, to portray Finch. Berton posed as Finch for the photographs (usually with his face averted from the lens). Berton stands at 6 feet 4 inches (1.93 m) and wears a size 14 shoe.

Novelist Jonathan Dee, who was working as Plimpton's assistant at the time, described Plimpton at the time of the writing of the article as "a wreck". Dee wrote years later, "Nothing, he knew, falls quite so flat as a bad joke. Such was his anxiety that, for the one and only time in my five years in his employ, he asked me to come in to work on a Saturday. I still remember my naïve astonishment at the sight of a world-famous, successful writer actually agonizing over whether something he’d written was good enough, funny enough, believable enough, or whether the whole thing would wind up making him seem like a national jackass." Dee also talked about his role in the Finch hoax in an outtake from the 2012 documentary film Plimpton! Starring George Plimpton as Himself.

== Response ==
The story was released in late March 1985. The subhead of the article read: "He's a pitcher, part yogi and part recluse. Impressively liberated from our opulent life-style, Sidd's deciding about yoga—and his future in baseball." The first letters of these last words spell out "Happy April Fools' Day—a(h) fib"; Despite this clue and the obvious absurdity of the article, many people believed Finch actually existed. Mets fans were overjoyed at their luck in finding such a player, and flooded Sports Illustrated with requests for more information. A New York sports page editor complained to the Mets' public relations director for allowing Sports Illustrated to break the news. Two general managers called Commissioner of Baseball Peter Ueberroth asking about Finch. The St. Petersburg Times sent a reporter to find Finch, and a radio talk show host claimed he saw Finch pitch.

The Mets gave Finch a locker between George Foster and Darryl Strawberry. The three major networks, CBS, NBC, and ABC, and the local St. Petersburg, Florida, newspapers sent reporters to Al Lang Stadium for a press conference about Finch. At the April 2 press conference, Berton announced Finch's retirement.

The magazine printed a much smaller article in the following April 8 issue announcing Finch's retirement. It then announced it was a hoax on April 15.

== Aftermath ==
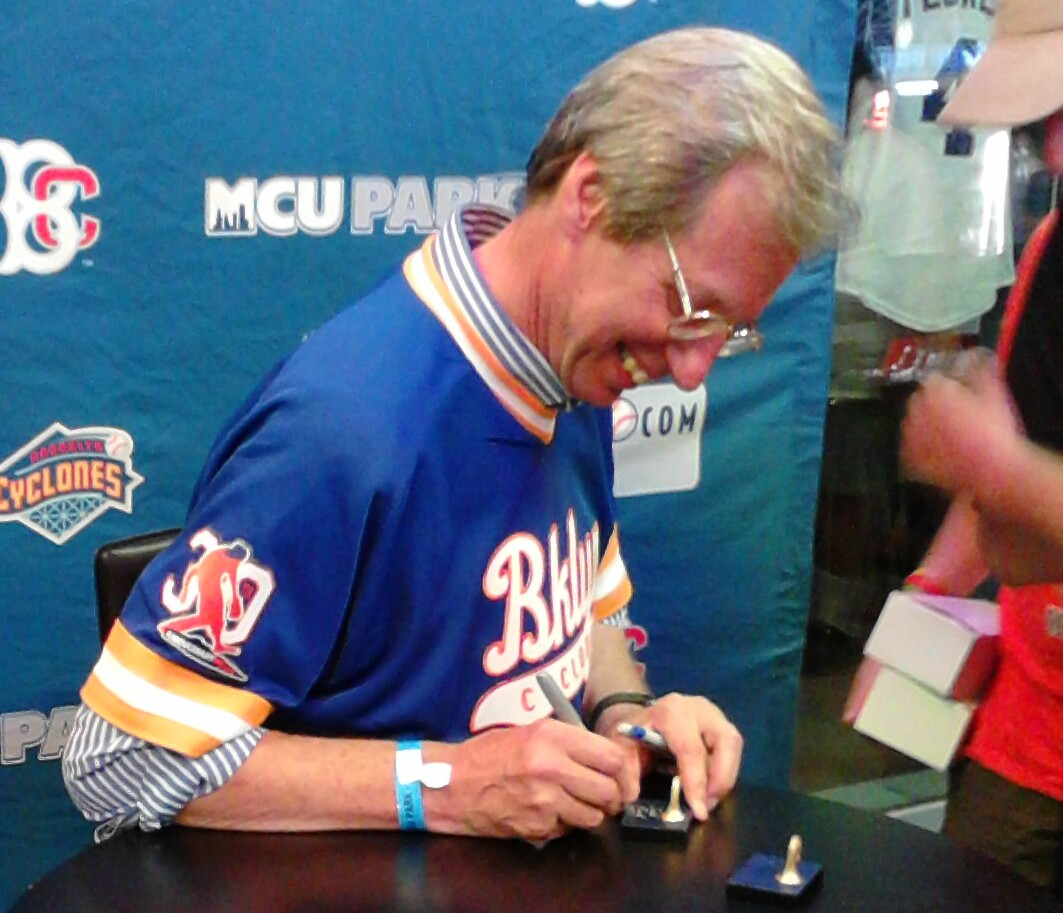
Joe Berton autographs a Sidd Finch bobblehead at a Brooklyn Cyclones game, with a special 30th anniversary logo on his jersey sleeve.

Plimpton eventually broadened his article into a novel, The Curious Case of Sidd Finch, first published in 1987. The book discussed Finch's "brief re-commitment to baseball", in which stories of Sadaharu Oh and Steve Dalkowski, as well as Finch's girlfriend, inspire Finch to stick with baseball, and he reaches Major League Baseball with the Mets.

In April 2015, ESPN released a documentary on its 30 for 30 Shorts program about the Sidd Finch phenomenon, as another April Fools' joke for a new generation.

On August 26, 2015, the Brooklyn Cyclones had a Sidd Finch bobblehead give-away for the 30th anniversary of the event. George Plimpton had died, so his son Taylor threw the ceremonial first pitch. Joe Berton attended and signed autographs on the bobbleheads. The bobblehead showed Finch in a Cyclones uniform, with French horn and one bare foot. The Cyclones were not in existence in 1985; a team executive explained in an interview during the game radio broadcast that using the Major League team name and logo would have been much more expensive.

== See also ==
- Taro Tsujimoto, a similar situation involving a fictitious ice hockey player
