= Paper Lion =

Book by George Plimpton

- Cover of the paperback edition, featuring a picture of George Plimpton
- Author: George Plimpton
- Language: English
- Subject: Sportswriting
- Publisher: Harper & Row
- Publication date: 1966
- Publication place: United States
- Pages: 362

Paper Lion is a 1966 non-fiction book by American author George Plimpton.

In 1960, Plimpton, not an athlete, arranged to pitch to a lineup of professional baseball players in an All-Star exhibition, presumably to answer the question, "How would the average man off of the street fare in an attempt to compete with the stars of professional sports?" He chronicled this experience in his book, Out of My League.

To write Paper Lion, Plimpton repeated the experiment in the National Football League, joining the training camp of the 1963 Detroit Lions on the premise of trying out to be the team's third-string quarterback. Plimpton, then 36 years old, showed how unlikely it would be for an "average" person to succeed as a professional football player. The book is an expanded version of Plimpton's two-part series which appeared in back-to-back issues of Sports Illustrated in September 1964. The book's epilogue is also an expanded article from Sports Illustrated, which appeared one year later.

Plimpton had contacted several teams about his idea including his hometown New York Giants and New York Titans (an American Football League team that would change their name to the New York Jets) and Baltimore Colts. The Lions finally agreed to host Plimpton in their training camp. The coaches were aware of the deception but the players were not until it became apparent that Plimpton did not know how to receive the snap from center. Despite his struggles, Plimpton convinced head coach George Wilson to let him take the first five snaps of the annual intra-squad scrimmage conducted in Pontiac, Michigan. Plimpton managed to lose yardage on each play.

Feeling confident he could do better, Plimpton hung around training camp one more week as the team prepared for its first pre-season game against the Cleveland Browns, being sure if the Lions had a big enough lead near the end of the game, Wilson would let him play. However, team officials informed Plimpton at halftime that NFL Commissioner Pete Rozelle would not allow him to play under any circumstance. The next day Plimpton packed up and ended his experiment. Before he left, however, the Lions awarded him a gold football that was engraved: "To the best rookie football player in Detroit Lions history."

The book is memorable as one of the first to showcase the personalities of the players and coaches and what happens off the field. Figuring prominently in the book are linebacker Wayne Walker, quarterback Milt Plum, future Hall of Famers cornerback Dick "Night Train" Lane and middle linebacker Joe Schmidt, and defensive tackle Alex Karras, among others. However, Karras' inclusion is exclusively through the stories about him told by teammates, coaches and other team personnel. Karras missed the 1963 season serving a suspension for gambling on football games.

Prior to Paper Lion, Plimpton had pitched to major league baseball players and sparred with boxing great Archie Moore, but the success of this book, which was later adapted into a 1968 film starring Alan Alda as Plimpton, helped launch a kind of second career for Plimpton as an everyman athlete. Plimpton followed Paper Lion with books about golf and ice hockey, as well as two more football books.

In an interview with Tom Bean and Luke Poling, the filmmakers of the documentary, Plimpton! Starring George Plimpton as Himself, Joe Schmidt talked about how the team reacted to Plimpton's presence. "He tried to blend in with the rest of the team, but after a while you could just see that George wasn't much of an athlete. You don't have to be a Rhodes Scholar to figure that one out. You're in training camp and you're all pretty good football players, and George comes along, and he's sort of emaciated looking, you know he's not too physical of a specimen. And he couldn't throw the ball more than 15 yards."

== Reception ==
Saturday Review called Paper Lion "the best book written about pro football—-maybe about any sport—because Plimpton captures with absolute fidelity how the average fan might feel given the opportunity to try out for a professional football team."

Stefan Fatsis joined the Denver Broncos as a kicker for preseason training camp in 2006. His story, which has been compared to Paper Lion, was told in A Few Seconds of Panic.

== Plimpton! The Great Quarterback Sneak ==
He did a reprise eight years later at age 44 for Plimpton! The Great Quarterback Sneak, an hour-long Wolper Productions television special which aired on the American Broadcasting Company (ABC) on November 26, 1971. This time around, he worked out with the defending Super Bowl V champion Baltimore Colts in preparation for a preseason game against the Lions in the first-ever professional gridiron contest played at Michigan Stadium on August 22, three months prior to the program's airing. His adviser for the project was John Gordy who, along with Alex Karras, was the inspiration for Plimpton's 1973 book Mad Ducks and Bears.

In the Colts' 23–20 loss to the Lions before a crowd of 91,745, Plimpton was the quarterback for four unofficial plays at the end of the first half which were for the filming of the television special. Wearing uniform number 1, he handed the ball off twice, had a short pass batted down and gained two yards on a quarterback draw before being hit in the ribs by Jim Mitchell and helped to his feet by Karras who had tackled him.

Bill Curry wrote in a September 25, 2003 ESPN.com column that Plimpton won the respect of the Colts players beginning on the first day of training camp by requesting to participate in the nutcracker drill and continuing to take snaps under center despite having dislocated his right thumb. Plimpton also performed all the preseason activities with his teammates and lasted the entire training camp. Curry and Plimpton became longtime friends and coauthors of One More July which was released in 1977.
