= A Few Seconds of Panic =

2008 book by Stefan Fatsis

- Author: Stefan Fatsis
- Language: English
- Genre: Sportswriting
- Published: 2008
- Publication place: United States

A Few Seconds of Panic is a nonfiction first-person narrative by Stefan Fatsis, published in 2008. The book chronicles Fatsis, a professional 43-year-old sportswriter working for The Wall Street Journal, and his attempt to play in the National Football League. Along the way, he relates the personal stories and struggles that professional football players face in the league. After some setbacks, Fatsis eventually finds some success as a backup placekicker for the Denver Broncos. The book's title comes from Jason Elam's description of being a kicker as "hours and hours of boredom surrounded by a few seconds of panic."

A Few Seconds of Panic has been compared to George Plimpton's Paper Lion, a 1966 book wherein the author joins the Detroit Lions as a backup quarterback.

== Featured persons ==
=== Kickers ===
- Jason Elam
- Paul Ernster
- Tyler Fredrickson
- Micah Knorr
- Todd Sauerbrun

=== Other players ===
- P. J. Alexander
- Jay Cutler
- Preston Parsons
- Jake Plummer
- Bradlee Van Pelt

=== Coaches and staff ===
- Pat Bowlen
- Ronnie Bradford
- Mike Shanahan
- Paul Woodside

== See also ==
- Gonzo journalism
- I Was a Toronto Blue Jay – a similar account of sportswriter Tom Verducci joining the Toronto Blue Jays of Major League Baseball for spring training in 2005.
- Word Freak – Fatsis's previous book, a look into the world of competitive Scrabble
