= Paul Woodside =

American football player (born 1963)

Paul Woodside (born September 2, 1963) is an American football placekicker who played college football at West Virginia University where he earned first-team All-America honors and set numerous placekicking and scoring records. In 2008, Woodside was featured in the book A Few Seconds of Panic by Stefan Fatsis.

== Early life ==
Woodside attended Falls Church High School in Falls Church, Virginia, graduating in 1981. He practiced "soccer-style" kicking in high school. As a young boy, Woodside spoke with a severe stutter.

== Collegiate career ==
Woodside enrolled at West Virginia University and joined the football team as a walk-on placekicker in 1981. As a four-year letter winner for the football team, Woodside established himself as one of the best placekickers in the nation and the finest in West Virginia University's history. He was known for his many eccentricities, including drawing patterns on his shoes with a magic marker, constant activity on the sideline during games, and practicing his kicks on the field facing the wrong direction. He was also known for having very poor vision, reportedly not being able to see the goal posts clearly on his longer kick attempts.

In 1982, Woodside set the NCAA Division I football record for the most field goals made in a season (28), a record that has been surpassed by four players. The current record is 31 (Billy Bennett, Georgia, 2003). Woodside set and still holds several NCAA records, including:

- Single season highest percentage of field goals made under 40 yards (min. 16), 100% (23 for 23; 1982; tied with 8 others)
- Single season most times kicking two or more field goals in a game, 10 (1982, tied with 2 others)

Woodside holds many career and single-season kicking and scoring records at West Virginia University, including:

- Longest field goal, 55 yards against Louisville (1984)
- Single season field goals made, 28 (1982)
- Single season field goals attempted, 31 (1982)
- Career field goals made, 74
- Career field goals attempted, 93
- Consecutive field goals made, 15 (1981–82)

=== Freshman season ===
After beating two scholarship kickers for the starting job, Woodside finished the season fourth in total scoring with 34 points. Woodside was successful in eight out of 12 field goal attempts and 10 out of 11 extra points. WVU finished the season with a record of 9-3, including a win in the Peach Bowl over Florida. In the bowl game, Woodside kicked four field goals, including a 49-yard field goal, second-longest in WVU history at the time and currently among the longest field goals in WVU history. The team finished the season with top-20 rankings in both national polls.

=== Sophomore season ===
As the full-time placekicker for WVU, Woodside finished the season as the team's leading scorer with 116 points, a team record at the time for kickers and second only to Ira Errett Rodgers's 147 points scored in 1919. Woodside's 28 field goals in 31 attempts set the NCAA Division I record for most field goals in a season. It also set the record in both categories for a single season at WVU, records that stood until 2014. Against Rutgers and Syracuse, Woodside scored 14 points, among the top ten performances by a kicker in WVU history. WVU finished the season with a loss against Florida State in the Gator Bowl and was ranked in the top 20 in both national polls.

Woodside was named to the UPI All-America second team and AP All-America third team.

=== Junior season ===
As a junior, Woodside continued to show excellent form as a placekicker. He again led the team in scoring with 100 points, currently fifth highest all time among kickers at WVU. He completed 21 of 25 field goal attempts, currently second and third all-time records at WVU. Woodside was perfect in 37 extra-point attempts. His 50-yard field goal against Pacific tied Ed Kenna's 1901 record for the longest field goal for WVU and is still among the longest recorded in school history. WVU defeated Kentucky in the Hall of Fame Bowl with Woodside kicking field goals of 39 and 23 yards. For the third consecutive season, WVU finished in the top 20 in both polls.

Woodside was named to the Sporting News All-America first team and the UPI All-America second team.

=== Senior season ===
Woodside kicked the game-winning field goal in the fourth quarter of WVU's upset over Penn State, helping WVU beat the Nittany Lions in one of the biggest games in WVU football history—the first victory against Penn State in 29 years. Woodside led the team in total scoring for the third consecutive year with 73 points (15 for 21 in field goals and 28 for 28 in extra points). Woodside broke his own record for the longest field goal in WVU history with a successful 55-yard attempt against Louisville. Five weeks later, he kicked a field goal of 53 yards against Syracuse. At the end of his career at WVU, Woodside was responsible for four of the five longest field goals in school history. WVU completed the season with a record of 8-4, including a victory over Texas Christian University in the Bluebonnet Bowl, the fourth consecutive bowl appearance for WVU. WVU was ranked in the top 25 in both national polls.

Woodside was named to the All-America first team.

== Post-college career ==
Woodside was drafted in the 12th round of the 1985 NFL draft by the Buffalo Bills as the 333rd pick. He did not make the team. In 1987, he was a member of the Kansas City Chiefs, but did not attempt any field goals or extra points.

In 1999, Woodside was inducted into the West Virginia University Sports Hall of Fame.

Woodside was featured in A Few Seconds of Panic (2008), journalist Stefan Fatsis's everyman account of attending the 2006 Denver Broncos training camp as a 43-year-old placekicker. Woodside was among the coaches who helped prepare Fatsis with instruction on technique, form, and kicking philosophy.

Woodside continues to provide kicking instruction through camps and personal training sessions. He is known for his unfailing enthusiasm for his students and their abilities and for his belief in using positive reinforcement.

== Sources ==
2010 NCAA Division I Football Records

West Virginia University Football Statistics

West Virginia University Hall of Fame Biography

West Virginia University Football Press Guide, 2010 Season

Fatsis, Stefan (2008). A Few Seconds of Panic: A 5-Foot-8, 170-Pound, 43-Year-Old Sportswriter Plays In The NFL. Penguin Group (USA). ISBN 978-1-59420-178-3.

NFL.com Player Database
