= Woodside High School =

Woodside High School may refer to:

- Woodside High School (Virginia), Newport News, Virginia, United States
- Woodside High School (California), Woodside, California, United States
- Woodside High School, Wood Green, Wood Green, London, England

== See also ==
- Woodside School (disambiguation)
