= Melissa Block =

American journalist (born 1961)

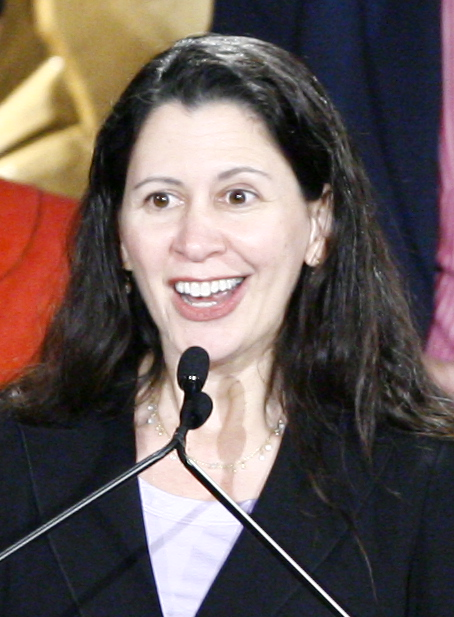
- Block at the 68th Annual Peabody Awards (2010)
- Born: December 28, 1961 (age 64)
- Education: Harvard University (BA)
- Occupations: Journalist, Radio host
- Notable credit: National Public Radio
- Spouse: Stefan Fatsis

Melissa Block (born December 28, 1961) is an American radio host and journalist. She co-hosted NPR's All Things Considered news program from 2003 until August 14, 2015. In August 2015 she became a Special Correspondent for NPR, responsible for detailed profiles of newsworthy figures, and long-form stories and series on topical issues. She retired from NPR in 2023.

== Biography ==
Melissa Block was born December 28, 1961. She graduated from Radcliffe College, Harvard University and was a Fulbright Scholar at the University of Geneva.

She began her NPR career in 1985 as an editorial assistant for All Things Considered and rose to become the show's senior producer. From 1994 to 2002, she was a New York reporter and correspondent for NPR. Her reporting after the September 11 attacks helped earn NPR a Peabody Award in 2001.

In 2008, Block was recording an interview in Chengdu, China, when the area was struck by a 7.9 magnitude earthquake. Her earthquake coverage earned her a Peabody Award, a duPont-Columbia Award, a National Headliner Award, and the Society of Professional Journalists' Sigma Delta Chi Award. Her coverage of the 9/11 terrorist attacks earned NPR a George Foster Peabody Award. Also, her reporting from Kosovo in 1999 for NPR won an Overseas Press Club Award.

== See also ==
- Michele Norris
- Robert Siegel
