= Mike Lucci =

American football player (1939–2021)

No. 52, 53
- Position: Linebacker

Personal information
- Born: December 29, 1939; Ambridge, Pennsylvania, U.S.
- Died: October 26, 2021 (aged 81); Florida, U.S.
- Listed height: 6 ft 2 in (1.88 m)
- Listed weight: 230 lb (104 kg)

Career information
- High school: Ambridge
- College: Pittsburgh; Tennessee
- NFL draft: 1961: 5th round, 69th overall pick
- AFL draft: 1961: 20th round, 160th overall pick

Career history
- Cleveland Browns (1962–1964); Detroit Lions (1965–1973)

Awards and highlights
- NFL champion (1964); Pro Bowl (1971); Detroit Lions All-Time Team; First-team All-SEC (1961)

Career NFL statistics
- Interceptions: 21
- Interception yards: 308
- Fumble recoveries: 9
- Sacks: 13.5
- Defensive touchdowns: 4
- Stats at Pro Football Reference

Michael Gene Lucci (December 29, 1939 – October 26, 2021) was an American professional football player who was a linebacker for 12 seasons in the National Football League (NFL). He played for the Cleveland Browns for three seasons from 1962 to 1964 and nine seasons with the Detroit Lions from 1965 to 1973. Lucci played college football for the Pittsburgh Panthers before transferring to the Tennessee Volunteers.

== Early life and college ==
Lucci was born into an Italian-American family on December 29, 1939, in Ambridge, Pennsylvania, near the steel mills of western Pennsylvania. He only played football for the first time as a high school senior, at tackle.

Lucci earned a football scholarship to the University of Pittsburgh, and later transferred for his final three years to the University of Tennessee. Lucci played center and linebacker at Tennessee. Over two consecutive seasons, he ran back interceptions for touchdowns against the University of North Carolina.

He was named an All-American in 1961, and played in the College All-Star Game against the Green Bay Packers. He also played in the Senior Bowl in January of 1962. He was named to the Southeastern Conference (SEC) All-Star Team in 1960 and 1961, being named first-team All-SEC by the Associated Press (AP) at center in 1961. Lucci received honorable mention on both the 1961 United Press International (UPI) All-America Team and 1961 AP All-American Team. He was also elected team captain in 1961.

== Playing career ==
Lucci was a fifth round draft pick of the Cleveland Browns in 1961 (69th overall). He played for the Browns from 1962 to 1964. He was named to the 1962 NFL All-Rookie Team, and was on the Browns' 1964 NFL Championship team.

Lucci joined the Lions as a result of a three-team transaction on August 30, 1965. He, along with a draft pick, were first sent by the Browns to the New York Giants for All-Pro cornerback Erich Barnes. Then the Giants traded him, guard Darrell Dess and a draft pick to the Lions for quarterback Earl Morrall.

Lucci would be with the Lions from 1965 to 1973. He was a 6 ft 2 in (1.88 m) 230-pound (104.3 kg) linebacker, playing principally at middle linebacker for the Lions, known for his ability to play through injury. Lucci's defensive coverage abilities earned him a total of 21 career interceptions in 117 games with the Lions. He returned four of those interceptions for touchdowns.

Lucci was the Lions' team captain in six seasons, and was voted by his teammates the Lions' Defensive Most Valuable Player from 1969 to 1971. In addition, in 1969, he was named second-team All-Pro by the Associated Press and United Press International (UPI). The UPI named him second-team All-Conference in 1970 and 1971, and The Sporting News named him first-team All-Conference in 1971. Lucci was named to the Pro Bowl following the 1971 season during which he intercepted five passes, two of which he returned for touchdowns.

On another Lucci interception and return, in an August 1971 exhibition game in Florida, Jets quarterback Joe Namath injured his knee attempting to tackle Lucci. Namath has said that injury began the downturn in his career, as witnessed by the number of games missed after that nearly season long injury, and the few games missed before the injury. Ironically, Lucci and Namath (Beaver Falls) are both from Beaver County, Pennsylvania. Both are members of the Beaver County Sports Hall of Fame.

In the January 1972 Pro Bowl game, Lucci deflected a field goal attempt by future hall of Hall of Fame kicker and NFL 100th Anniversary All Time Team member, Jan Stenerud.

He retired before the 1974 season, having played 154 regular season games over 12 years.

== Honors ==
In addition to the honors and awards listed above, Lucci has received the following awards and honors, among others;

- Inducted into the Michigan Sports Hall of Fame (2004)
- Inducted into the Pennsylvania Sports Hall of Fame (1986)
- Inducted into the National Italian-American Sports Hall of Fame (1995)
- Inducted into the Beaver County, Pennsylvania Sports Hall of Fame (1979)
- Inducted into the Western Pennsylvania Hall of Fame (1985)
- Inducted into the Pennsylvania Italian American Hall of Fame
- Ricky Sandoval Award, presented by Detroit Lions for contributions in sports and the community (2017)

== Media career ==
Lucci appeared as himself in the 1968 film Paper Lion, and as the hitman "Fast Eddie" in the 1973 film Detroit 9000. He also appeared in commercials for Alitalia Airlines. From 1976 to 1978 Lucci served as a color analyst for Lions broadcasts on WJR radio. In 1979, he was a part-time NFL analyst for NBC television.

== Business career and charities ==
After retiring from the NFL Lucci was a successful business executive and entrepreneur. He first entered business as a vice president and national physical fitness director for the Vic Tanny chain of health spas. He was the former president of Bally's which at the time was the largest commercial operator of fitness centers in the United States. He co-owned 19 Burger Kings, and Venture Contracting and Development based in Troy, Michigan.

Among other charitable endeavors, Lucci raised over $2 million for Spaulding for Children's, seeking permanent homes for hard-to-place children, and he established an education endowment fund for these children. He raised $650,000 for Gridiron Greats by hosting a golf tournament, to help former NFL players in financial need.

== Death ==
Lucci divided his time between homes in Michigan and Palm Beach County, Florida. He died in Florida following an extended illness on October 26, 2021, at the age of 81. At the time of his death, he had been married for 58 years to Patricia Lucci, with whom he had two children, and two grandchildren.
