= George Plimpton =

American writer (1927–2003)

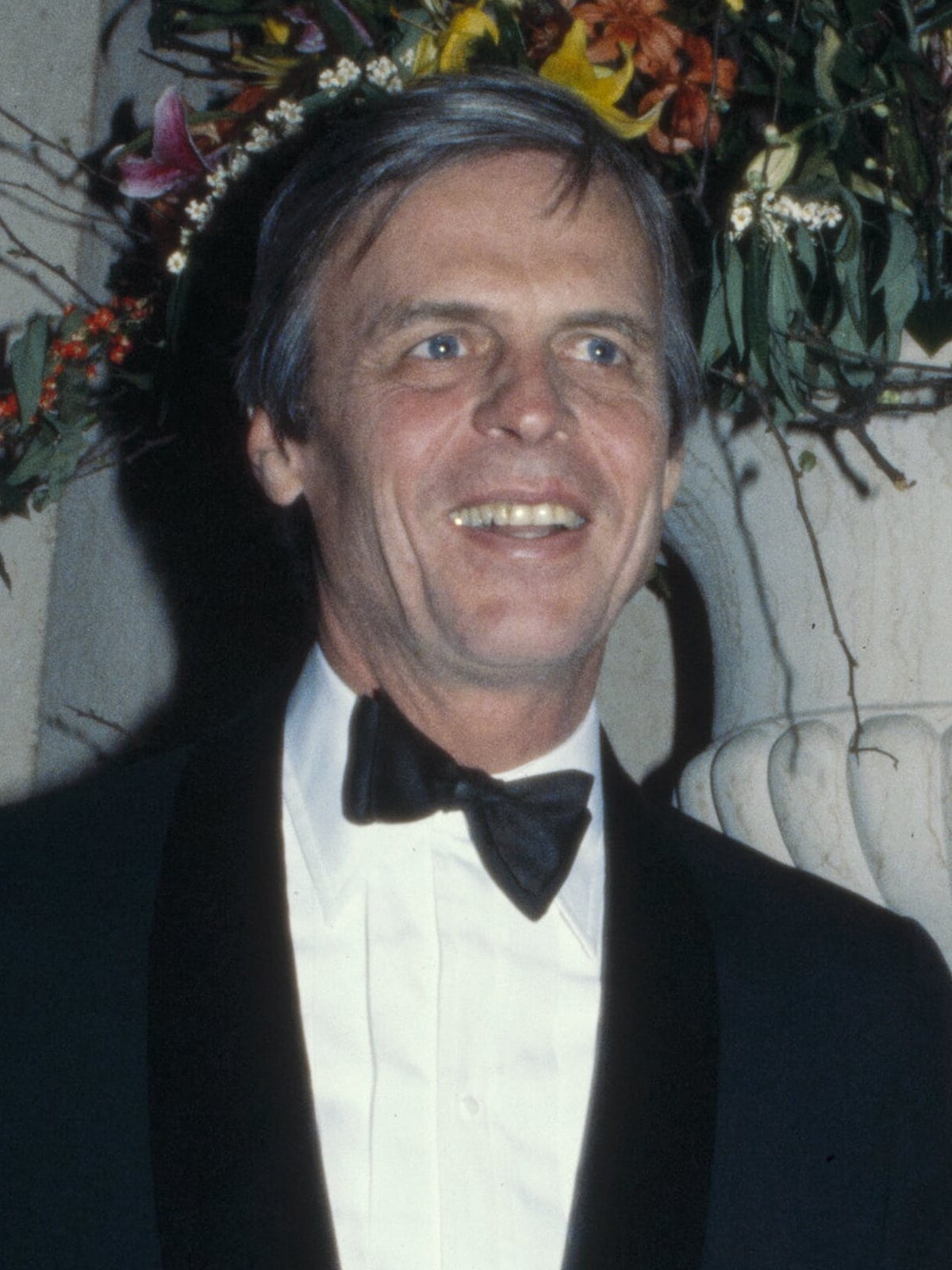
- Plimpton in 1977
- Born: George Ames Plimpton; March 18, 1927; New York City, U.S.
- Died: September 25, 2003 (aged 76); New York City, U.S.
- Education: Harvard University (BA); King's College, Cambridge (BA)
- Occupations: Writer; journalist; literary editor; actor
- Spouses: Freddy Medora Espy (m. 1968; div. 1988) Sarah Whitehead Dudley (m. 1991)
- Children: 4

George Ames Plimpton (March 18, 1927 – September 25, 2003) was an American writer. He is known for his sports writing, for helping found The Paris Review, as well as his patrician accent. He was known for "participatory journalism," including accounts of his active involvement in professional sporting events, acting in a Western, performing a comedy act at Caesars Palace in Las Vegas, and playing with the New York Philharmonic Orchestra and then recording the experience from the point of view of an amateur.

According to The New York Times, his "exploits in editing and writing seesawed between belles lettres and the witty accounts he wrote of his various madcap attempts to slip into other people's high-profile careers ... a lanky, urbane man possessed of boundless energy and perpetual bonhomie became, in 1953, the first and only editor of The Paris Review. A ubiquitous presence at book parties and other gala social events, he was tireless in his commitment to the serious, contemporary fiction the magazine publishes ... All of this contributed to the charm of reading about Mr. Plimpton's frequently hapless adventures as 'professional' athlete, stand-up comedian, movie bad guy or circus performer; which he chronicled in witty, elegant prose in nearly three dozen books."

== Early life ==
Plimpton was born in New York City on March 18, 1927, and spent his childhood there, attending St. Bernard's School and growing up in an apartment duplex on Manhattan's Upper East Side located at 1165 Fifth Avenue. During the summers, he lived in the hamlet of West Hills, Huntington, Suffolk County on Long Island.

He was the son of Francis T. P. Plimpton and the grandson of Frances Taylor Pearsons and George Arthur Plimpton. His father was a successful corporate lawyer and name partner of the law firm Debevoise and Plimpton; he was appointed by President John F. Kennedy as U.S. deputy ambassador to the United Nations, serving from 1961 to 1965.

His mother was Pauline Ames, the daughter of botanist Oakes Ames (1874–1950) and artist Blanche Ames. Both of Plimpton's maternal grandparents were born with the surname Ames; his mother was the granddaughter of Medal of Honor recipient Adelbert Ames (1835–1933), an American sailor, soldier, and politician, and Oliver Ames, a US political figure and the 35th governor of Massachusetts (1887–1890). She was also the great-granddaughter on her father's side of Oakes Ames (1804–1873), an industrialist and congressman who was implicated in the Crédit Mobilier railroad scandal of 1872; and Governor-General of New Orleans Benjamin Franklin Butler, an American lawyer and politician who represented Massachusetts in the United States House of Representatives and later served as the 33rd governor of Massachusetts.

Plimpton's son described him as a White Anglo-Saxon Protestant and wrote that both of Plimpton's parents were descended from Mayflower passengers.

George had three siblings: Francis Taylor Pearsons Plimpton Jr., Oakes Ames Plimpton, and Sarah Gay Plimpton.

== Education ==
After St. Bernard's School, Plimpton attended Phillips Exeter Academy (from which he was expelled just shy of graduation), and Daytona Beach High School, where he received his high school diploma, before entering Harvard College in July 1944. He wrote for the Harvard Lampoon, was a member of the Hasty Pudding Club, Pi Eta, the Signet Society, and the Porcellian Club and majored in English. Plimpton entered Harvard as a member of the Class of 1948, but did not graduate until 1950 due to intervening military service. He was also an accomplished birdwatcher.

Plimpton's studies at Harvard were interrupted by military service from 1945 to 1948, during which time he served in Italy as an Army tank driver. After finishing at Harvard in 1950, he attended King's College, Cambridge, from 1950 to 1952, and graduated with third class honors in English.

== Career ==
=== The Paris Review ===
In 1952, Plimpton was recruited by Peter Matthiessen to join the literary journal The Paris Review, founded by Matthiessen, Thomas H. Guinzburg, and Harold L. Humes. This periodical has carried great weight in the literary world, but has never been financially strong; for its first half-century, it was allegedly largely financed by its publishers and by Plimpton. Matthiessen took the magazine over from Humes and ousted him as editor, replacing him with Plimpton, using it as his cover for Matthiessen's CIA activities. Jean Stein became Plimpton's co-editor. Plimpton was associated with the Paris literary magazine Merlin, which folded because the State Department withdrew its support. Future Poet Laureate Donald Hall, who had met Plimpton at Exeter, was Poetry Editor. One of the magazine's most notable discoveries was author and screenwriter Terry Southern, who was living in Paris at the time and formed a lifelong friendship with Plimpton, along with writer Alexander Trocchi and future classical and jazz pioneer David Amram. In 1958, he published an influential article about Vali Myers. That same year, Plimpton interviewed Ernest Hemingway for the Review.

=== Participatory journalism ===
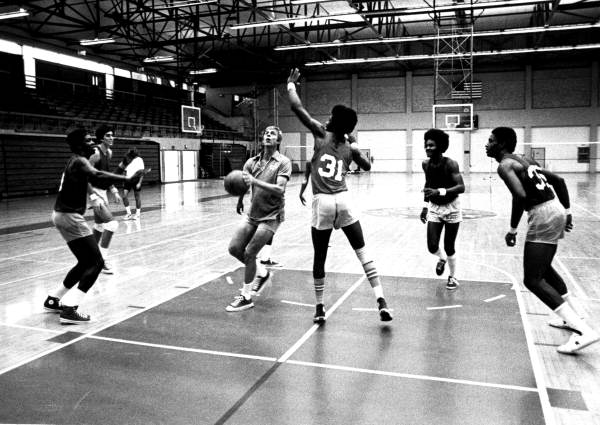
Plimpton playing basketball at Miami Dade Community College in 1975

Plimpton was famous for competing in professional sporting events and then recording the experience from the point of view of an amateur. Per The New York Times, "As a 'participatory journalist,' Mr. Plimpton believed that it was not enough for writers of nonfiction to simply observe; they needed to immerse themselves in whatever they were covering to understand fully what was involved. For example, he believed that football huddles and conversations on the bench constituted a 'secret world, and if you're a voyeur, you want to be down there, getting it firsthand'." He was influenced by Paul Gallico, about whom he said: "What Gallico did was to climb down out of the press box." In 1958, prior to a post-season exhibition game at Yankee Stadium between teams managed by Willie Mays (National League) and Mickey Mantle (American League), Plimpton pitched against the National League. This experience was captured in Out of My League (1961). (He intended to face both line-ups, but tired badly and was relieved by Ralph Houk.) Plimpton sparred for three rounds with boxing greats Archie Moore and Sugar Ray Robinson while on assignment for Sports Illustrated. Hemingway praised Out of My League as "beautifully observed and incredibly conceived, his account of a self-imposed ordeal that has the chilling quality of a true nightmare ... It is the dark side of the moon of Walter Mitty."

In 1963, Plimpton attended preseason training with the Detroit Lions of the National Football League as a backup quarterback, and he ran a few plays in an intrasquad scrimmage. These events were recalled in his best-known book, Paper Lion (1966), which was adapted as a 1968 film starring Alan Alda. Plimpton revisited pro football in 1971, this time joining the defending Super Bowl champion Baltimore Colts and seeing action in an exhibition game against his previous team, the Lions. These experiences served as the basis of Mad Ducks and Bears (1973), although much of the book dealt with the off-field escapades and observations of football friends Alex Karras ("Mad Duck") and John Gordy ("Bear").

Plimpton's The Bogey Man (1968) chronicles his attempt to play professional golf on the PGA Tour during the Nicklaus and Palmer era of the 1960s. Among other challenges for Sports Illustrated, he attempted to play top-level bridge, and spent some time as a high-wire circus performer. Some of these events, such as his stint with the Colts, and an attempt at stand-up comedy, were presented on the ABC television network as a series of specials. Open Net (1985) saw him train as an ice hockey goalie with the Boston Bruins, even playing part of a National Hockey League preseason game.

Among other adventures, he attempted "acrobatics as an aerialist for the Clyde Beatty-Cole Brothers Circus—he failed miserably". More happily, he tried "his hand as a percussionist with the New York Philharmonic (where a miss-hit on the gong earned him the immediate applause of conductor Leonard Bernstein)."

=== Sidd Finch ===
In the April 1, 1985, issue of Sports Illustrated, Plimpton pulled off a widely reported April Fools' Day prank. With the help of the New York Mets organization and several Mets players, Plimpton wrote an account of an unknown pitcher in the Mets spring training camp, Siddhartha Finch, who threw a baseball over 160 mph, wore a hiking boot on one foot, and was a practicing Buddhist who had studied yoga in Tibet. The article had many clues that the story was a prank, starting with the subheading: "He's a pitcher, part yogi and part recluse. Impressively liberated from our opulent life-style, Sidd's deciding about yoga—and his future in baseball." This is an acrostic reading "Happy April Fools' Day—a(h) fib". The article was so convincing that many readers believed it, and the popularity of the prank led to Plimpton expanding on Sidd's story in The Curious Case of Sidd Finch (1987).

=== Fireworks ===
Plimpton was a demolitions expert in the post–World War II Army. After returning to New York from Paris, he routinely launched fireworks at his evening parties. His fireworks fascination flourished, and in 1975, in Bellport, Long Island, with Fireworks by Grucci, he attempted to break the record for the world's largest firework. His firework, a Roman candle named "Fat Man", weighed 720 pounds (330 kg) and was expected to rise to 1,000 feet (300 m) or more and deliver a wide starburst. When lit, the firework remained on the ground and exploded, blasting a crater 35 feet (11 m) wide and 10 feet (3.0 m) deep. A later attempt, fired at Cape Canaveral, rose approximately 50 feet (15 m) into the air and broke 700 windows in Titusville, Florida.

With Felix Grucci, Plimpton competed in the 16th International Fireworks Festival in 1979 in Monte Carlo. After several problems with transporting and preparing the fireworks, Plimpton and Grucci became the first competitors from the United States to win the event. Plimpton was appointed Fireworks Commissioner of New York by Mayor John Lindsay, an unofficial post he held until his death. With the Grucci family, he helped choreograph the fireworks for the 1983 Brooklyn Bridge Centennial Celebration and for the second inauguration of Ronald Reagan. Plimpton's passion for pyrotechnics led him to write Fireworks (1984), and he hosted an A&E Home Video on the subject, featuring his many fireworks adventures with the Gruccis.

=== Other writings ===
Plimpton and Jean Stein edited an oral biography of Edie Sedgwick, Edie: An American Biography (1982). He appeared in a featurette about Sedgwick found on the Ciao! Manhattan DVD. He appeared in the PBS American Masters documentary on Andy Warhol and in the closing credits of the 2006 film Factory Girl. In 1998, Plimpton published an oral biography of Truman Capote. Between 2000 and 2003, he wrote the libretto to the opera Animal Tales, commissioned by Family Opera Initiative, with music by Kitty Brazelton and directed by Grethe Barrett Holby. He wrote, "I suppose in a mild way there is a lesson to be learned for the young, or the young at heart – the gumption to get out and try one's wings". In 2002, Plimpton collaborated with Terry Quinn on Zelda, Scott and Ernest, a play based on the correspondence of F. Scott Fitzgerald, Zelda Fitzgerald and Hemingway.

=== Documentary appearances ===
In 1989, Plimpton appeared in the documentary The Tightrope Dancer, about the life and the work of the artist Vali Myers. In 1994, Plimpton appeared in the Ken Burns series Baseball, sharing personal baseball experiences and commenting on memorable events from the history of the game. In 1996, he appeared in the documentary When We Were Kings, about the "Rumble in the Jungle", the 1974 Ali-Foreman Championship fight. Plimpton credited Muhammad Ali as a poet who composed the world's shortest poem: "Me? Whee!!"

=== Acting ===
Plimpton appeared in more than thirty films as an extra or in cameo appearances. He was a Bedouin in Lawrence of Arabia (1962), a thief in Rio Lobo (1970), Tom Hanks's antagonistic father in Volunteers (1985) and a psychologist in Good Will Hunting (1997). Plimpton called himself "the Prince of Cameos." He also appeared in television commercials in the early 1980s, including a memorable campaign for Mattel's Intellivision. In this campaign, Plimpton touted the superiority regarding the graphics and sounds of Intellivision video games over the Atari 2600.

He hosted Mouseterpiece Theater, a Masterpiece Theatre spoof featuring Disney cartoon shorts. He had a recurring role as the grandfather of Dr. Carter on ER and was a cast member of Nero Wolfe (2001–02). In The Simpsons episode "I'm Spelling as Fast as I Can", he hosts the "Spellympics" and attempts to bribe Lisa to lose with the offer of a scholarship at a Seven Sisters College and a hot plate: "it's perfect for soup!"

=== Parodies of Plimpton's career ===
A November 6, 1971, cartoon in The New Yorker by Whitney Darrow Jr. shows a cleaning lady on her hands and knees scrubbing an office floor while saying to another one: "I'd like to see George Plimpton do this sometime." In another cartoon in The New Yorker, a patient looks up at the masked surgeon about to operate on him and asks, "Wait a minute! How do I know you're not George Plimpton?" A feature in Mad titled "Some Really Dangerous Jobs for George Plimpton" spotlighted him trying to swim across Lake Erie, strolling through New York's Times Square in the middle of the night, and spending a week with Jerry Lewis.

== Personal life ==
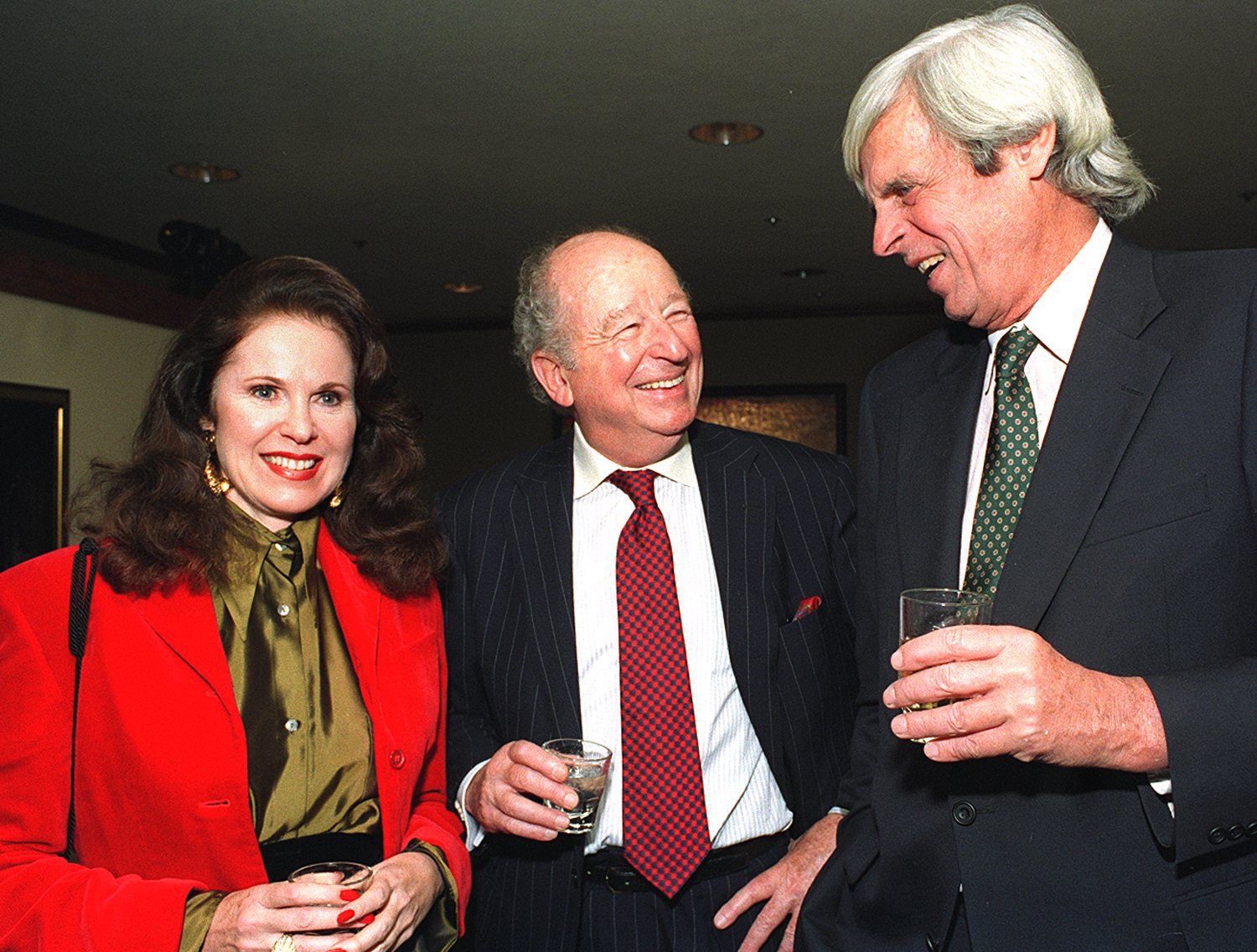
Plimpton with Herb Caen and Ann Miller in 1993

Plimpton was known for his distinctive accent which, by Plimpton's own admission, was often mistaken for an English accent. Plimpton himself described it as a "New England cosmopolitan accent" or "Eastern seaboard cosmopolitan" accent. His son, Taylor, described it as a mixture of "old New England, old New York, tinged with a hint of King's College King's English."

Plimpton was married twice. His first wife, whom he married in 1968 and divorced in 1988, was Freddy Medora Espy, a photographer's assistant. She was the daughter of writers Willard R. Espy and Hilda S. Cole, who had, earlier in her career, been a publicity agent for Kate Smith and Fred Waring. They had two children: Medora Ames Plimpton and Taylor Ames Plimpton, who has published a memoir entitled My Father's Son (2027), about growing up with his father.

In 1992, Plimpton married Sarah Whitehead Dudley, a graduate of Columbia University and a freelance writer. She is the daughter of James Chittenden Dudley, a managing partner of Manhattan-based investment firm Dudley and Company, and geologist Elisabeth Claypool. The Dudleys established the 36-acre (15 ha) Highstead Arboretum in Redding, Connecticut. Plimpton and Dudley were the parents of twin daughters Laura Dudley Plimpton and Olivia Hartley Plimpton.

=== Friendship with Robert F. Kennedy ===
At Harvard, Plimpton was a classmate and close personal friend of Robert F. Kennedy. Plimpton, along with former decathlete Rafer Johnson and American football star Rosey Grier, was credited with helping wrestle Sirhan Sirhan to the floor when Kennedy was assassinated following his victory in the 1968 California Democratic primary at the former Ambassador Hotel in Los Angeles, California. Kennedy died the next day at Good Samaritan Hospital.

== Death and tributes ==
Plimpton died on September 25, 2003, in his New York City apartment from a heart attack later determined to have been caused by a catecholamine surge. He was 76.

The annual "Amateur Backgammon championships" held in Las Vegas from 1978 onwards were called the Plimpton Cup.

Plimpton was made an officier of the French Ordre des Arts et des Lettres and a chevalier of the Legion of Honour, and was a member of the American Academy of Arts and Letters.

An oral biography, George, Being George was edited by Nelson W. Aldrich Jr., and released on October 21, 2008. The book offers memories of Plimpton from Norman Mailer, William Styron, Gay Talese and Gore Vidal among other writers, and was written with the cooperation of both his ex-wife and his widow.

Plimpton was the subject of the American Masters documentary Plimpton! Starring George Plimpton as Himself. In it the writer James Salter said of Plimpton that "he was writing in a genre that really doesn't permit greatness." The film used archival audio and video of Plimpton lecturing and reading to create a posthumous narration.

In 2006, the musician Jonathan Coulton wrote the song entitled "A Talk with George", a part of his 'Thing a Week' series, in tribute to Plimpton's many adventures and approach to life.

Plimpton is the protagonist of the semi-fictional George Plimpton's Video Falconry, a 1983 ColecoVision game postulated by humorist John Hodgman and recreated by video game auteur Tom Fulp.

Researcher and writer Samuel Arbesman filed with NASA to name an asteroid after Plimpton; NASA issued the certificate 7932 Plimpton in 2009. His final interview appeared in The New York Sports Express of October 2, 2003, by journalist Dave Hollander.

Plimpton is also a character in the novel "Exit Ghost" by Philip Roth, in the last chapter.

== Selected works ==
=== Publications ===
==== Author ====
- Letters in Training (letters to home from Italy, privately printed, 1946)
- The Rabbit's Umbrella (children's book, 1955)
- Out of My League (baseball, 1961)
- Go Caroline, (about Caroline Kennedy, privately printed, 1963)
- Paper Lion (about his experience playing professional football with the Detroit Lions, 1966)
- The Bogey Man (about his experiences travelling with the PGA Tour, 1967)
- Mad Ducks and Bears (about Detroit Lions linemen Alex Karras and John Gordy, with extensive chapters focused on Hall of Fame quarterback Bobby Layne and Plimpton's return to football, this time with the Baltimore Colts, 1973)
- One for the Record: The Inside Story of Hank Aaron's Chase for the Home Run Record (1974)
- Shadow Box (about boxing, author's bout with Archie Moore, Ali-Foreman showdown in Zaire, 1977)
- One More July (about the last NFL training camp of former Packer and future coach Bill Curry, 1977)
- Fireworks: A History and Celebration (1984)
- Open Net (about his experience playing professional ice hockey with the Boston Bruins, 1985)
- The Curious Case of Sidd Finch (a novel that extends a Sports Illustrated April Fools piece about a fictitious baseball pitcher who could throw at over 160 mph (260 km/h), 1987)
- The X Factor: A Quest for Excellence (1990)
- The Best of Plimpton (1990)
- Truman Capote: In Which Various Friends, Enemies, Acquaintances, and Detractors Recall His Turbulent Career (1997)
- The Man in the Flying Lawn Chair: And Other Excursions and Observations (2004)

==== Editor ====
- Writers at Work (The Paris Review Interviews), several volumes
- American Journey: the Times of Robert Kennedy (with Jean Stein)
- As Told at the Explorers Club: More Than Fifty Gripping Tales of Adventure
- Edie: An American Girl

==== Introductions ====
- The Writer's Chapbook: A Compendium of Fact, Opinion, Wit, and Advice from the 20th Century's Preeminent Writers
- Above New York, by Robert Cameron

=== Film appearances ===
- Lawrence of Arabia (1962) – Bedouin (uncredited)
- Beyond the Law (1968) – Mayor
- Hickory Hill (1968) – narrator in Richard Leacock's documentary on the Annual Spring Pet Show at Robert F. Kennedy's Virginia estate, Hickory Hill (McLean, Virginia)
- The Detective (1968) – Reporter (uncredited)
- Paper Lion (1968) – Plimpton, played by Alan Alda, is the lead character in the largely fictional film, loosely based on the 1966 nonfiction book. Anecdotally, Plimpton appeared in the film in an uncredited cameo in a crowd scene.
- Rio Lobo (1970) – 4th Gunman (Plimpton's preparation and filming for his role as "Fourth Gunman" was the subject of a 1972 television program.)
- The Private Files of J. Edgar Hoover (1977) – Quentin Reynolds
- If Ever I See You Again (1978) – Lawrence Lawrence
- Reds (1981) – Horace Whigham
- Garbo Talks (1984) – Himself (uncredited)
- Volunteers (1985) – Lawrence Bourne Jr.
- A Fool and His Money (1989) – God
- Easy Wheels (1989) – Surgeon
- The Bonfire of the Vanities (1990) – Well Wisher
- L.A. Story (1991) – Straight Weatherman
- Little Man Tate (1991) – Winston F. Buckner
- Ken Burns' Baseball (1994) – Himself
- Just Cause (1995) – Elder Phillips
- Nixon (1995) – President's Lawyer
- When We Were Kings (1996) – Himself – Writer
- Good Will Hunting (Miramax, 1997) – Henry Lipkin – Psychologist
- The Last Days of Disco (1998) – Clubgoer
- EDtv (1999) – Panel Member
- Just Visiting (2001) – Dr. Brady
- Sam the Man (2001) – Himself
- The Sports Pages (2001) – Himself
- The Devil and Daniel Webster (2003) – Himself (uncredited)
- Factory Girl (2006) – Himself
- Soul Power (2008) – Himself
- Plimpton! Starring George Plimpton as Himself (2012) – Himself

=== Television appearances ===
- Plimpton! The Man on the Flying Trapeze (1971) – Himself – ABC documentary
- Mouseterpiece Theater (1983–1984) – Host / Himself – Disney Channel
- Uncensored Channels: TV Around the World with George Plimpton (1986)
- The Equalizer (1989) – Clinton Brandauer – Episode: "Starfire"
- The Civil War (1990) – New Yorker, George Templeton Strong (voice) – Reading his diary
- Wings (1994) – Dr. Grayson – Episode: "The Shrink"
- Baseball: A Film by Ken Burns (1994) – (voice) – PBS documentary
- Married... with Children (1995) – 200th Episode Special Host – Episode: "Best O' Bundy"
- ER (1998, 2001) – John Truman Carter Sr.
- Saturday Night Live (1999, 2002) – Himself (uncredited) – Season 1, March 13 episode, he is one of the audience cutaway shots (usually featured in the early seasons with comedic and fictitious non-sequitur captions as to who the audience member was, or what they did). He is labelled as having "Roomed with Wendy Yoshimura".
- Just Shoot Me (2000) – Himself – During the show's A&E Biography of fictional character 'Nina Van Horn'
- A Nero Wolfe Mystery (2001–2002) – (various roles) – Member of the repertory cast, in the episodes, "Eeny Meeny Murder Mo", "Over My Dead Body", "Death of a Doxy", "Murder Is Corny", "Help Wanted, Male", "The Silent Speaker" and "Immune to Murder"
- The Simpsons (2003) – Himself – Episode: "I'm Spelling as Fast as I Can"

=== Commercial appearances on television ===
- Oldsmobile Vista Cruiser, pitchman, himself, released by Oldsmobile in late 1968 for the 1969 model year
- Intellivision, pitchman, himself, released by Mattel in 1980. Plimpton was featured in a string of Intellivision commercials and print ads in the early 1980s.
- "Pop-Secret", pitchman, himself.

=== Literary characterizations ===
- Plimpton appears as a character in Philip Roth's novel, Exit Ghost.
