= Adam Roffman =

American film producer

Adam Roffman is a property master and on-set dresser for feature films working primarily on the East Coast and a producer of independent features.

Adam started his career working as an intern on the Emmy-winning program Bill Nye the Science Guy in 1996. Since that time Adam has worked with such directors as Robert Altman, Martin Scorsese, David O. Russell, Paul Feig, James Toback, Bobby and Peter Farrelly, Peter Hedges, Ben Affleck, Edward Burns, Martin Campbell, and numerous others. Some of the better known films Adam has worked on are The Departed, Fever Pitch, State and Main, The Perfect Storm, Stuck on You, Camp, Tanner on Tanner, Gone Baby Gone, Dan in Real Life, 27 Dresses, Surrogates, Edge of Darkness, Grown Ups, The Town, The Heat, Ted, American Hustle, The Equalizer, Sex Tape, and Black Mass.

In 2001, Roffman wrote, co-directed, and starred in the short film The Terror of the Invisible Man. This one-minute film was written in five minutes, shot within two hours and edited in one hour, at a budget of under $100. The film was made solely as a joke to show friends, but eventually ended up playing at 28 film festivals and receiving television distribution on the Independent Film Channel and internet distribution on Atom Films.

In 2003, Roffman was one of the founding staff members of the Independent Film Festival of Boston and became the festival's first Program Director and served in that capacity through 2013. The festival quickly became the première film festival in the New England area. In its first year, the festival had over 10,000 people in attendance. By 2008, the attendance number had grown to over 23,000 people. In the summer of 2013 Roffman stepped down as Program Director to focus on his film work, but remained an advisor to the festival.

In 2007, Roffman began to branch out into being a film producer. Roffman is the producer of director Alex Karpovsky's second film, Woodpecker and third film Trust Us, This Is All Made Up as well as Garth Donovan's Phillip the Fossil and Tom Bean and Luke Poling's Plimpton! Starring George Plimpton as Himself.

In 2014, Roffman teamed up with Luke Poling to direct a short documentary, Spearhunter, which focuses on Colonel Gene Morris, "The World's Greatest Living Spear Hunter", and his Spear Hunting Museum in Summerdale, Alabama. They collaborated with filmmaker Nathaniel Hansen, who served as the film's cinematographer and editor.

In 2017 Roffman collaborated again with filmmaker Nathaniel Hansen on The Collection, a short documentary about a massive archive of letterpress blocks once used to print film advertisements. The film premiered at South by Southwest and attracted the attention of Tim League, founder of Alamo Drafthouse Cinema, who went on to acquire the collection and repurpose the blocks into the design of Alamo-affiliated bars in Boston, Manhattan, and Austin.
