= Woodside Park (disambiguation) =

Woodside Park may refer to:

- Woodside Park (Silver Spring, Maryland), a neighborhood of Silver Spring, Maryland, United States
- Woodside Amusement Park, a former amusement park in Philadelphia, Pennsylvania, United States, constructed in 1897 and operated until 1955
- Woodside Park, Barnet, a suburban residential area in Barnet, London, England.
  - Woodside Park tube station, the tube station for Woodside Park, England
- Woodside Park, Haringey, a park in Wood Green, north London, England
