= Woodside School =

Woodside School may refer to:

- Woodside Primary School, Woodside, Aberdeen
- Woodside Priory School, Portola Valley, California, United States
- Woodside Elementary School District, San Francisco Bay Area, California, United States

== See also ==
- Woodside High School (disambiguation)
