= Super Jock =

1970s toy line

Super Jock was a toy made by Schaper Toys from the 1970s. It featured various action figures playing sports of the day including basketball, hockey, baseball, football, and soccer. Pressing down on the toy's head caused it to kick, throw, or hit a ball or puck.
