= John Gordy =

American football player and labor leader (1935–2009)

No. 75
- Positions: Guard, tackle

Personal information
- Born: July 17, 1935; Nashville, Tennessee, U.S.
- Died: January 30, 2009 (aged 73); Orange, California, U.S.
- Listed height: 6 ft 3 in (1.91 m)
- Listed weight: 248 lb (112 kg)

Career information
- College: Tennessee
- NFL draft: 1957: 2nd round, 24th overall pick

Career history
- Detroit Lions (1957, 1959–1967)

Awards and highlights
- NFL champion (1957); 3× Second Team All-Pro (1964, 1966, 1967); 3× Pro Bowl (1963-1965); First-team All-SEC (1956)

Career NFL statistics
- Games played: 134
- Games started: 128
- Fumble recoveries: 4
- Stats at Pro Football Reference

John Thomas Gordy, Jr. (July 17, 1935 – January 30, 2009) was an American professional football player for 11 years from 1957 to 1967. He was an offensive guard for the Detroit Lions.

== Early life ==
Gordy was born on July 17, 1935 in Nashville, Tennessee. He was the son of John Thomas Gordy and Margaret Ruth Poe. Gordy played his final season of high school football as a lineman for the former Isaac Litton High School (now closed) in the Inglewood neighborhood of Nashville, Tennessee, winning the 1952 Clinic Bowl and the Nashville Interscholastic League AA Division. He was named second-team All-Nashville Interscholastic League and honorable mention All-State. The Tennessean included Gordy on a list of the 50 best high school football players in Nashville's history. He is a member of the Metro Nashville Public Schools Sports Hall of Fame. He did not play in his senior year, but still received a scholarship to the University of Tennessee.

== College ==
Gordy subsequently played college football for the Tennessee Volunteers, under coach Bowden Wyatt. He started at right tackle for two years and was team captain in his senior season,1956, when he was named All-Southeastern Conference. The Volunteers won the Southeastern Conference that year with a 10–0 record, but lost in the Sugar Bowl to Baylor. The Volunteers ended the season ranked number 2 in the nation. Their star player was Johnny Majors, who served as Gordy's alternate captain (and went on to become a legendary coach at the University of Pittsburgh and at Tennessee). Majors and Gordy remained close even after college.

While at the University of Tennessee, he was a member of the Lambda Chi Alpha fraternity. In 2018, he was voted one of the 10 greatest players from the Nashville area ever to have played UT football by a panel of sportswriters.

== Career ==
=== National Football League ===
Gordy was drafted in the second round of the 1957 NFL draft by the Lions (24th overall). The 1957 Lions, quarterbacked primarily by Tobin Rote and with Gordy playing a key role in the blocking schemes at right tackle, won the NFL championship, the last Lions team to do so (as of 2024). He left the team in 1958 to be an assistant coach at the University of Nebraska, but returned to the Lions in 1959, and played every year through 1967.

He played in three Pro Bowls during his professional career (1963–1965). United Press International (UPI) selected him first-team All-Pro in 1964 through 1966, and second-team in 1967. The Associated Press selected him second-team All-Pro in 1964, 1966 and 1967. Gordy was selected to the Columbus Touchdown Club's first All-Pro team in 1964. He started in 128 or 134 games he played for the Lions.

In 2008, he was selected to the Lion's 75th Anniversary Team.

=== National Football League Players Association ===
Gordy served as president and executive director of the professional football players union, the National Football League Players Association. As such, in 1969, he was a key negotiator of the first collective bargaining agreement in major professional sports. Among other things, the union demanded higher minimum salaries, independent arbitration, and more money for the player's pension fund. The owners balked, the players voted to strike, and the owners declared a lockout. Less than two weeks later, an agreement was reached that was short of what the players sought. Another NFLPA executive director described Gordy as a cornerstone of the union who made lasting contributions; and though the first strike was short, Gordy had made a point to the owners. He had been the driving force of the NFLPA negotiating team which included, among others, players King Hill, Ernie Green, Bob Vogel, and Dave Robinson. Shortly after ratifying the collective bargaining agreement, he was forced to retire from the NFL due to a lingering knee injury. He had suffered a serious knee injury in the Lions 1968 training camp and retired before the season started.

=== Post NFL career ===
"Participatory journalist" George Plimpton stated that Gordy was the inspiration for his second book (of three) about professional American football, Mad Ducks and Bears. Plimpton initially met Gordy in 1960 while doing early research for what would become his first pro football book, Paper Lion, and was told by Gordy that in his opinion there was an obvious wide market for a book about football line play, consisting of young men and boys currently playing those positions and older men who had done so in the past, together forming a potential readership of millions. Gordy, whose football nickname was "Bear" due to his hirsuteness, was able to interest his erstwhile training camp roommate, Alex Karras ("Mad Duck") in the project as well, although the book was not published until 13 years after this initial meeting. Rather than being the technical work about methods and techniques that Gordy had originally envisioned, it is instead primarily a collection of humorous anecdotes and vignettes, with only minimal attention paid to technical aspects of football.

Around 1970, Gordy became President of Visual Sounds, Inc., the audio-visual subsidiary of A & R Recording in Manhattan.

Gordy became the California state director of Fellowship of Christian Athletes in 1999. At that time, there were only a handful of public high schools that were participating with FCA. Gordy created and led FCA Huddle groups in gang-riddled areas and high schools of Los Angeles, such as South Central and in Santa Anita. He raised funds for the FCA, and helped establish an FCA Board of Directors in Southern California. The Southern California FCS sent hundreds of student-athletes to various FCA camps. By the time Gordy died, nearly every single high school in Southern California had an FCA group on their campus. Gordy considered this his greatest accomplishment. He was inducted into the FCA Hall of Champions in 2006.

== Personal life ==
Gordy was married three times. He first married – on June 2, 1957, in Nashville – Yvonne Hodge. He again married – on July 1, 1972, in Blue Hill, Maine – Jean Becton DeMeritt (née Jean Sprague Becton) (also her second marriage), a 1965 graduate of Vassar College and granddaughter of Maxwell Becton, co-founder of Becton Dickinson, a multinational medical device manufacturer. Jean and John Gordy divorced December 29, 1982, in Santa Barbara County, California. John Gordy married again to Betty Euelene Epperson (maiden).

Gordy's father, Poppa John Gordy (né John Thomas Gordy; 1904–1961), a dixieland jazz, swing, ragtime, and honky-tonk pianist, was for more than 25 years, musical director of The Noon Show on station WSM, the NBC Radio Network affiliate in Nashville.

== Death ==
Gordy died on January 30, 2009, in Orange, California, after a lengthy battle with pancreatic cancer.

== Bibliography ==
=== References ===
- Almond, Steve (April 26, 2016). "Mad Ducks and Bears". The Paris Review.
- Billboard; Joe, Radcliffe Alfred (1937–2003) (September 19, 1970). "1972 A&R Studios Setting Up Small Satellites". Vol. 82, no. 38. pp. 3, 8 – via Google Books.
- ESPN (January 31, 2009). "Ex-Lions Lineman Gordy Dies at 73" (AP).
- Knox News (January 31, 2009). "Gordy, Captain of 1956 SEC Championship Team, Dies at 73". Archived from the original on February 5, 2009 – via Wayback Machine.
1. Print ed. → "Gordy, Who Was 1956 Captain for UT, Dies". February 1, 2009. p. D8 (digital image 40) – via Newspapers.com.
2. Blog ed. → "Gordy, Captain of 1956 SEC Championship Team, Dies at 73". January 31, 2009. Archived from the original on February 5, 2009 – via Wayback Machine.
- New York Times (The) (April 16, 1972). "John Gordy, Ex-Football Star, to Wed Mrs. Jean DeMeritt". Vol. 121, no. 41721 (Late City ed.). p. 63 – via TimesMachine (permalink).
- Tennessean (The); Toppmeyer, Blake (November 23, 2018). "Enemy Territory: Top 10 Vols Football Players From Nashville – John Gordy". Vol. 114, no. 327. pp. 1C–2C – via Newspapers.com. ISSN 1053-6590; ProQuest 2136848320 (US Newsstream database).
