= Willson Woodside =

Canadian journalist

Charles Willson Woodside (1905 – May 29, 1991) was a Canadian journalist well-known for his World War II reporting. He was also an author and a professor of political science at the University of Guelph.

== Biography ==
Willson Woodside was born in Portage la Prairie, Manitoba and raised in the prairies of Canada. He attained a bachelor's degree in engineering at the University of Toronto just prior to the Great Depression; following this he worked briefly as an engineer and then taught at the University of Toronto from 1929 to 1934.

During this time he travelled extensively during the summers in Europe and particularly in Germany, although he was barred from the country by the Nazis after several visits.

During this period Woodside became a journalist and prominently predicted the outbreak of war in Europe. During the Second World War, he was a member of the Allied press corps and reported nightly on the radio for the Canadian Broadcasting Corporation. Following the war, he became Foreign Editor at Saturday Night.

Woodside also served in the post-war period as the executive director of the United Nations Association in Canada. In 1954, he ran unsuccessfully for a seat in the House of Commons of Canada as a Tory in a by-election in the Toronto riding of Trinity, losing to Liberal Donald Carrick by 1352 votes. He wrote a book entitled The University Question which discussed the funding and use of higher education in Canada. He then joined the political science department of the University of Guelph, Ontario, as a founding member of the faculty and also chair. He was a professor of the university from 1966 to 1974. His archives are presently held in the university's library.

Woodside was the great-nephew of Henry Joseph Woodside, an entrepreneur and soldier known for his photography during the Boer War and the First World War.
