= Henry Joseph Woodside =

Canadian businessman, journalist and writer

Henry Joseph Woodside (November 6, 1858 – November 8, 1929) was a Canadian businessman, journalist, writer, and photographer.

== Biography ==
Born in Arkwright, Canada West, Woodside attended school at Owen Sound and Prince Arthur's Landing (now part of Thunder Bay). From 1878-1880 he worked for the Canadian Pacific Railway at the beginning of its great westwards expansion.

Between 1880 and 1898 Woodside ran a number of businesses in Portage la Prairie, including a newspaper, the Manitoba Liberal. He served in the Canadian Militia during the North-West Rebellion of 1885.

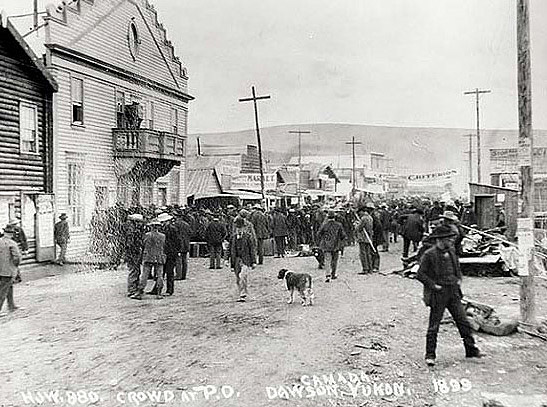
Photo by Henry Joseph Woodside of crowd assembled at Dawson Post Office, Yukon 1899

In 1898 he relocated to the Yukon at the height of the Klondike Gold Rush and soon after was serving as managing editor of the Yukon Sun. He resigned from the paper in 1901 and was appointed Census Commissioner for the Yukon Territory. His photographs from this period provide a considerable portion of the recorded visual history of the Gold Rush.

While there Woodside befriended Robert Henderson and spent considerable effort, through his newspaper and Canadian government contacts, in getting Henderson (a Canadian) recognised as the authentic discoverer of gold in the Klondike.

In 1901-1902 Woodside joined the 2nd Regiment, Canadian Mounted Rifles, a six-squadron regiment of 901 officers and men and saw action in South Africa during the Boer War, earning the rank of major.

In 1906 he was hired as city manager for the Imperial Guarantee and Accident Company in Ottawa. He served again with the rank of colonel in World War I in the 5th Regiment, Canadian Mounted Rifles, and was wounded in France in May 1916.

Woodside's great-nephew Willson Woodside later become known within Canada as a war correspondent for the CBC during World War II.
