= Woodside station =

Woodside station may refer to:

== United Kingdom ==
- Woodside (Aberdeen) railway station, a closed station in Aberdeen, on the Great North of Scotland Railway
- Woodside railway station (London), a closed station on the Woodside and South Croydon Joint Railway
- Woodside Park tube station, a station on the Northern line, north London
- Birkenhead Woodside railway station, a closed station on the Birkenhead Railway
- Horsforth Woodside railway station, a proposed station on the Harrogate Line
- Tumby Woodside railway station, a closed station on the Great Northern Railway
- Woodside and Burrelton railway station, a closed station on the Caledonian Railway

== United States ==
- 61st Street–Woodside station, a station on the New York City Subway
- Woodside station (LIRR), a station on the Long Island Rail Road in New York
- Woodside station (Maryland), a proposed station on the Purple Line in Maryland

== Elsewhere ==
- Woodside railway station, Victoria, a closed station on the Woodside line in Australia
- Woodside railway station, Wellington Region, on the Wairarapa Line in New Zealand

== See also ==
- Woodside tram stop, a tram stop on the Tramlink system in south London, England
