= Robert Cameron (photographer) =

American photographer and author

- Born: April 21, 1911
- Died: November 10, 2009 (aged 98)
- Occupations: photographer and author
- Known for: published books featuring aerial photographs of cities around the world
- Notable work: Above San Francisco; Above New York; Above Paris; Above London; Above Mexico City; Above Las Vegas

Robert Cameron (April 21, 1911 – November 10, 2009) was a famed American photographer and author of numerous books featuring aerial photographs of numerous cities throughout the globe. He also invented a fad diet known as the Drinking Man's Diet.

== Works ==
Cameron's book style consists of an aerial photograph with text and history of the site and occasionally on the opposing page a historical photo of the same site with text. The books are always all photographic and are primarily of large conurbations. His career began as a photographic journalist for the Des Moines Register in 1933. During the Second World War he worked as a photographer for the United States Department of War. He founded the publishing company Cameron and Company in 1964 with the publication of The Drinking Man's Diet, which went on to sell over 2.4 million copies worldwide in 13 different languages. His books of aerial photography include:

- Above San Francisco
- Above New York
- Above Paris
- Above London
- Above Mexico City
- Above Las Vegas
- Above Chicago
- Above Los Angeles
- Above Washington
- Above Seattle
- Above San Diego
- Above Carmel
- Above Mackinac
- Above Yosemite
- Above Tahoe
- Above Alcatraz
- Above Petoskey
- Above Harbor Springs
- Above Makinak Island

In the 1991 film Defending Your Life, Cameron's books can be seen sitting on a coffee table, one of which features the film's fictitious city, Judgement City.

== Drinking Man's Diet ==
Cameron was known for a fad diet he invented known as the Drinking Man's Diet. In 1964, he promoted the diet in his booklet The Drinking Man’s Diet: How to Lose Weight with a Minimum of Willpower. The diet became popular and sold over 2.4 million copies in 13 languages. The Drinking Man's Diet was a low-carb high-fat diet with plenty of meat and alcohol.

It has been described as a predecessor to the Atkins diet and the Paleolithic diet. A 1965 article in the Time Magazine, noted that "the book's contents are a cocktail of wishful thinking, a jigger of nonsense and a dash of sound advice." Nutritionists such as Jean Mayer and Frederick J. Stare found the diet "ridiculous" and criticized it as unhealthy. Dr. Philip L. White from the American Medical Association described the diet as "utter nonsense, has no scientific basis, and is chock-full of errors."
