= Plimpton! Starring George Plimpton as Himself =

- Directed by: Tom Bean & Luke Poling
- Produced by: Tom Bean; Luke Poling; Terry McDonell; Adam Roffman
- Release dates: June 2012 (AFI Silverdocs); 22 May 2013 (United States)
- Running time: 89 minutes
- Country: United States
- Language: English

Plimpton! Starring George Plimpton as Himself is a 2013 American documentary film directed by Tom Bean and Luke Poling about the writer George Plimpton, who was a co-founder of The Paris Review and contributor to the participatory journalism genre.

== Synopsis ==
Plimpton! tells the story of writer, editor and amateur sportsman, George Plimpton. Starting with his getting kicked out of Exeter, the film follows Plimpton as he joins The Paris Review as its first editor and the creation of the "Art of Fiction" series.

Plimpton also starts writing for Sports Illustrated, undertaking various participatory journalism attempts, including pitching against an all-star major league baseball line-up, including Willie Mays, taking the field as an NFL quarterback with the Detroit Lions and skating with the Boston Bruins as a goalie. All of these adventures were turned into books, including Out of My League, Paper Lion, and Open Net.

The film also examines Plimpton's private life, including his wrestling Sirhan Sirhan for control of the gun, moments after the assassination of Robert F. Kennedy.

The movie uses excerpts from interviews and lectures and readings by Plimpton as narration, with interviews with his friends and family to tell his story. It also features never-before-seen photos and video, including Robert F. Kennedy talking about George on the campaign trail, and photos of Plimpton's various participatory attempts.

== Production ==
The film features Plimpton as principal narrator and interviews with Hugh Hefner, Robert F. Kennedy Jr., Mel Stuart, Walon Green, Philip Gourevitch, James Salter, Christopher Cerf, Jonathan Dee, Jay McInerney, Gay Talese, Peter Matthiessen, Ken Burns, Mike Milbury, Robert Silvers, Taylor Plimpton and James Lipton, amongst others. The film was produced by Bean, Poling, Adam Roffman and Terry McDonell.

It took filmmakers Bean and Poling five years to make the film, as they searched through archival material and assembled the film's story. Their goal was to have Plimpton posthumously act as the film's narrator. Poling said the archival material was in the form of "audio tapes, video tapes, 8mm film reels — every type of format you could think of both currently in use and long extinct — that we had to go through to find the footage for the film." The filmmakers also uncovered Plimpton's notebook from his time with the Detroit Lions, a time that would eventually become Paper Lion, one of Plimpton's best-known books. Bean described the first pages of the notebook as, "a journal, him packing and getting on a plane to go to Detroit to join the Lions, it mimics, really closely, what became the first page of the book.”

Talking about the film in interviews to promote its theatrical release, the filmmakers said, "Making our movie was an adventure, and a wonderful one at that. We often said that if you simply had to think about and study one person for years and years, George Plimpton was a pretty good guy to pick."

== Release ==
The film debuted at the AFI SilverDocs film festival in Silver Spring, MD in June 2012, before playing festivals around the world. It opened theatrically in New York City in May 2013, and also played in Los Angeles, Boston, Denver, Detroit, Chicago, Dallas, Phoenix, Palm Springs, Providence, Washington DC and other cities.

The film debuted in the United Kingdom on PBS America on February 16, 2014.

The film debuted on US television on American Masters, on May 16, 2014.

=== Critical response ===
On Rotten Tomatoes the film has an approval rating of 96% based on reviews from 27 critics. On Metacritic the film has a score of 74% based on reviews from 14 critics, indicating "generally favorable reviews".

The New York Times called it, " skilled portrait of a literary light.”. Entertainment Weekly gave the film an "A." IndieWire said, "smartly constructed, using copious archival interviews to allow Plimpton to largely tell his own story, Bean and Poling's documentary is a brilliant example of creative biographical filmmaking." On the strength of the film, directors Bean and Poling were named one of "10 to Watch" by The Independent magazine.
