= Woodside Township, Polk County, Minnesota =

Woodside Township, Minnesota
- Township
- Location of Woodside Township, within Polk County, Minnesota
- Coordinates: 47°38′7″N 96°7′12″W
- Country: United States
- State: Minnesota
- County: Polk

Area
  - Total: 35.8 sq mi (92.8 km^{2})
  - Land: 30.8 sq mi (79.9 km^{2})
  - Water: 5.0 sq mi (13.0 km^{2})
- Elevation: 1,191 ft (363 m)

Population (2020)
  - Total: 512
  - Density: 16.6/sq mi (6.41/km^{2})
- Time zone: UTC-6 (Central (CST))
  - Summer (DST): UTC-5 (CDT)
- FIPS code: 27-71662
- GNIS feature ID: 0666048

Woodside Township is a township in Polk County, Minnesota, United States. It is part of the Grand Forks-ND-MN Metropolitan Statistical Area. The population was 512 at the 2020 census.

Woodside Township was organized in 1882, and named for the woods along the shore of Maple Lake.

== Geography ==
According to the United States Census Bureau, the township has a total area of 35.8 square miles (92.8 km^{2}), of which 30.8 square miles (79.9 km^{2}) is land and 5.0 square miles (12.9 km^{2}) (13.95%) is water.

== Demographics ==
As of the census of 2000, there were 514 people, 210 households, and 162 families residing in the township. The population density was 16.7 people per square mile (6.4/km^{2}). There were 653 housing units at an average density of 21.2/sq mi (8.2/km^{2}). The racial makeup of the township was 98.44% White, 0.78% Native American, and 0.78% from two or more races. Hispanic or Latino of any race were 0.19% of the population.

There were 210 households, out of which 27.6% had children under the age of 18 living with them, 73.3% were married couples living together, 1.9% had a female householder with no husband present, and 22.4% were non-families. 19.0% of all households were made up of individuals, and 7.6% had someone living alone who was 65 years of age or older. The average household size was 2.45 and the average family size was 2.79.

In the township the population was spread out, with 22.6% under the age of 18, 4.3% from 18 to 24, 23.3% from 25 to 44, 35.2% from 45 to 64, and 14.6% who were 65 years of age or older. The median age was 45 years. For every 100 females, there were 116.0 males. For every 100 females age 18 and over, there were 110.6 males.

The median income for a household in the township was $39,750, and the median income for a family was $49,250. Males had a median income of $35,341 versus $21,500 for females. The per capita income for the township was $20,433. About 7.0% of families and 10.6% of the population were below the poverty line, including 11.5% of those under age 18 and 5.7% of those age 65 or over.
