= Stefan Fatsis =

American journalist

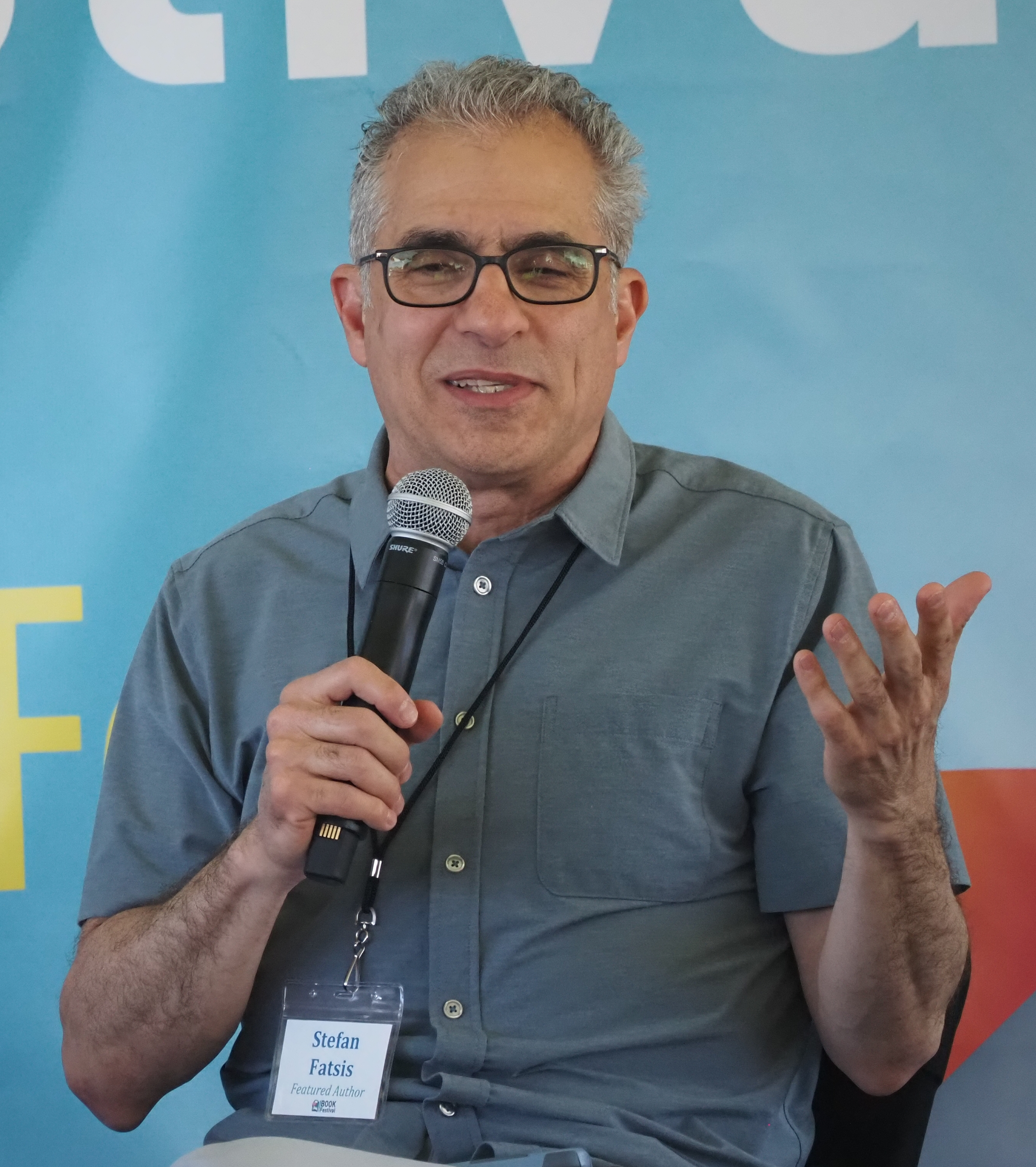
- at the 2026 Gaithersburg Book Festival
- Occupations: Author, journalist
- Spouse: Melissa Block

Signature
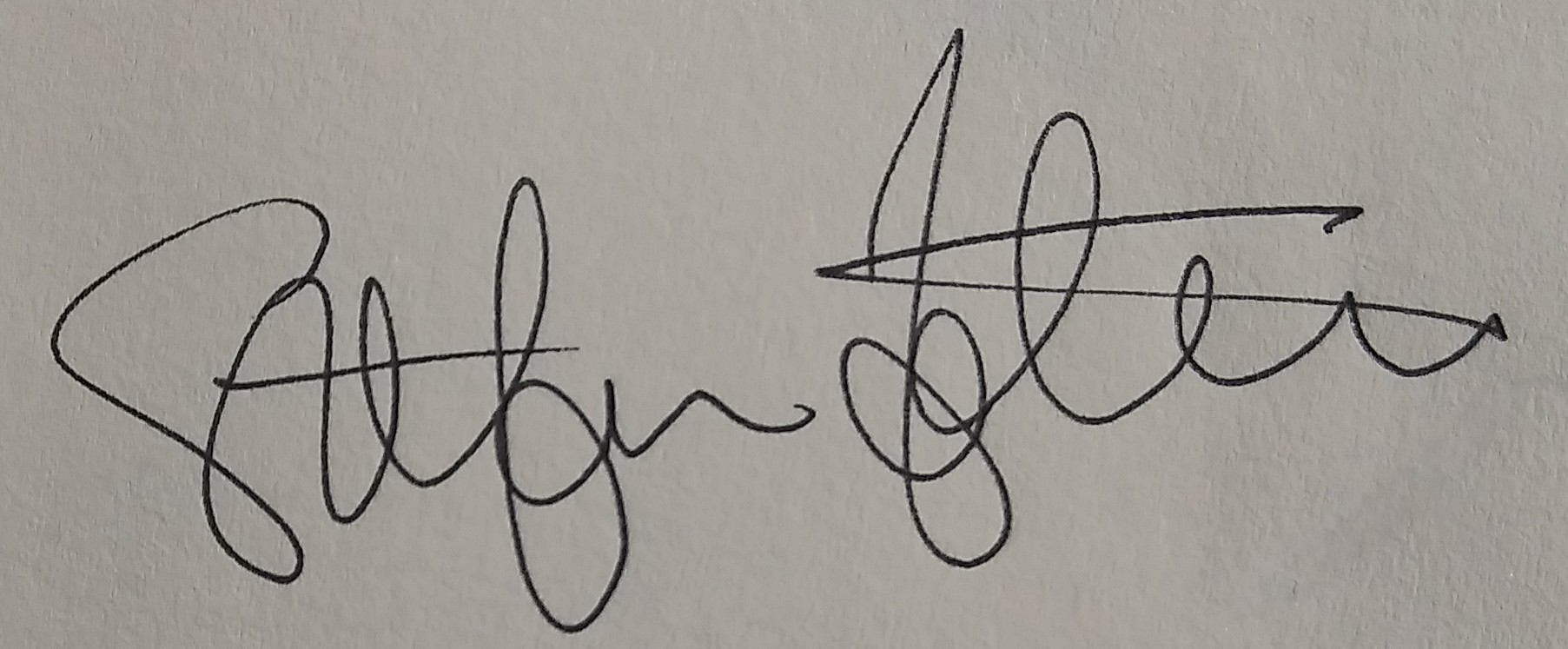

Stefan Fatsis (/ˈstɛfən ˈfætsɪs/ STEF-ən FAT-siss) is an American author and journalist. He regularly appears as a guest on National Public Radio's All Things Considered daily radio news program and as a panelist on Slate's sports podcast Hang Up and Listen. He is a former staff reporter for The Wall Street Journal.

== Biography ==
Fatsis grew up in Pelham, New York. He graduated from the University of Pennsylvania in 1985 with a degree in American civilization. He was a staff writer for the Daily Pennsylvanian as an undergraduate. From 1985 to 1994 he was a reporter for The Associated Press in Athens, Greece; Philadelphia; Boston; and New York. He wrote about sports for The Wall Street Journal from 1995 to 2006.

Fatsis is the author of four books: Wild and Outside: How a Renegade Minor League Revived the Spirit of Baseball in America's Heartland (1995); Word Freak: Heartbreak, Triumph, Genius, and Obsession in the World of Competitive Scrabble Players (2001), about the subculture of tournament Scrabble, in which Fatsis immersed himself as a player; A Few Seconds of Panic: A 5-Foot-8, 170-Pound, 43-Year-Old Sportswriter Plays in the NFL (2008; paperback: A Few Seconds of Panic: A Sportswriter Plays in the NFL (2009)); and Unabridged: The Thrill of (and Threat to) the Modern Dictionary. For A Few Seconds of Panic Fatsis trained as a placekicker and spent the summer of 2006 as a member of the Denver Broncos during the team's training camp. Similarly, he has written that he "embedded at Merriam as a lexicographer-in-training and drafted or identified more than 100 potential entries" for the firm's dictionary.

Fatsis's work also appears in several anthologies: Top of the Order: 25 Writers Pick Their Favorite Baseball Player of All Time (April 2010), The Final Four of Everything (2009), Anatomy of Baseball (2008), The Best Creative Nonfiction Vol. 2 (2008) and The Enlightened Bracketologist: The Final Four of Everything (2007). He also writes or has written for The New York Times, The New York Times's defunct Play magazine, Sports Illustrated, SI.com, Slate, The Atlantic, The New Republic.com, Deadspin, Defector Media, and other publications.

He lives in Washington, D.C., with his wife, former All Things Considered co-host Melissa Block, and their daughter, Chloe Fatsis, who is also a tournament Scrabble player.
