= Woodside Township, Otter Tail County, Minnesota =

Woodside Township, Minnesota
- Township
- Location of Woodside Township, within Otter Tail County, Minnesota

- Location within the state of Minnesota Woodside Township, Minnesota (the United States)
- Coordinates: 46°14′44″N 95°13′9″W
- Country: United States
- State: Minnesota
- County: Otter Tail

Area
  - Total: 36.2 sq mi (93.8 km^{2})
  - Land: 36.2 sq mi (93.8 km^{2})
  - Water: 0 sq mi (0.0 km^{2})
- Elevation: 1,437 ft (438 m)

Population (2020)
  - Total: 252
  - Density: 6.96/sq mi (2.69/km^{2})
- Time zone: UTC-6 (Central (CST))
  - Summer (DST): UTC-5 (CDT)
- FIPS code: 27-71644
- GNIS feature ID: 0666047

Woodside Township is a township in Otter Tail County, Minnesota, United States. The population was 252 at the 2020 census.

== History ==
Woodside Township was organized in 1877, and named for tracts of woods within its borders.

== Geography ==
According to the United States Census Bureau, the township has a total area of 36.2 square miles (93.8 km^{2}), all land.

== Demographics ==
As of the census of 2000, there were 293 people, 90 households, and 77 families residing in the township. The population density was 8.1 people per square mile (3.1/km^{2}). There were 120 housing units at an average density of 3.3/sq mi (1.3/km^{2}). The racial makeup of the township was 96.59% White, 2.05% Native American, and 1.37% from two or more races.

There were 90 households, out of which 42.2% had children under the age of 18 living with them, 68.9% were married couples living together, 6.7% had a female householder with no husband present, and 14.4% were non-families. 13.3% of all households were made up of individuals, and 4.4% had someone living alone who was 65 years of age or older. The average household size was 3.26 and the average family size was 3.53.

In the township the population was spread out, with 35.2% under the age of 18, 9.2% from 18 to 24, 20.1% from 25 to 44, 23.5% from 45 to 64, and 11.9% who were 65 years of age or older. The median age was 32 years. For every 100 females, there were 106.3 males. For every 100 females age 18 and over, there were 111.1 males.

The median income for a household in the township was $24,125, and the median income for a family was $26,042. Males had a median income of $20,714 versus $21,667 for females. The per capita income for the township was $9,716. About 17.3% of families and 19.6% of the population were below the poverty line, including 19.3% of those under the age of eighteen and 25.9% of those 65 or over.
