= 1996 Detroit Lions season =

NFL team season

- Owner: William Clay Ford Sr.
- General manager: Chuck Schmidt
- Head coach: Wayne Fontes
- Offensive coordinator: Tom Moore
- Defensive coordinator: Jim Eddy
- Home stadium: Pontiac Silverdome

Results
- Record: 5–11
- Division place: 5th NFC Central
- Playoffs: Did not qualify
- All-Pros: WR Herman Moore (1st team); RB Barry Sanders (2nd team)
- Pro Bowlers: WR Herman Moore; RB Barry Sanders

Uniform

The Detroit Lions played their 67th season in the National Football League (NFL) in 1996. The team declined severely from their previous season's output of 10–6. Following a 4–2 start, the Lions lost nine of their final ten games to finish 5–11, missing the playoffs for the first time in four seasons.

Following the season, longtime head coach Wayne Fontes was fired and Bobby Ross was hired to be the team's head coach the following season.

== Offseason ==
Additions	Subtractions
RB Glyn Milburn (Broncos)	T Lomas Brown (Cardinals)
TE Pete Metzelaars (Panthers)	LB Chris Spielman (Bills)
T Ray Roberts (Seahawks)	LB Tracy Hayworth (Falcons)
	S Willie Clay (Patriots)
	G Doug Widell (Colts)
	DE Dan Owens (Falcons)

=== NFL draft ===
1996 Detroit Lions draft
Round	Pick	Player	Position	College	Notes
1	17	Reggie Brown	LB	Texas A&M	from Seattle
1	23	Jeff Hartings *	G	Penn State	
3	76	Ryan Stewart	S	Georgia Tech	from New England
4	129	Brad Ford	CB	Alabama	compensatory pick
5	158	Kerwin Waldroup	DT	Central State	
Made roster * Made at least one Pro Bowl during career

Notes

- Detroit received San Diego's first-round selection (21st) in exchange for Detroit's second-round selection in 1995.
- Detroit traded up from the pick it received from San Diego (21st) with Seattle to the 17th pick, giving up a third-round selection (91st) in return. The 91st pick was received from Kansas City in exchange for S William White.
- Detroit traded its second- and seventh-round selections (55th and 236th) to Denver in exchange for RB Glyn Milburn.
- Detroit traded up from its third-round selection (86th) with New England to the Patriots' third-round selection (76th), giving up its fourth- and sixth-round selections (119th and 195th).

== Personnel ==
=== Staff ===
1996 Detroit Lions staff
Front office: Chairman and president – William Clay Ford Sr.; Vice chairman – William Clay Ford Jr.; Executive vice president and chief operating officer – Chuck Schmidt; Vice president of player personnel – Ron Hughes; Vice president of football administration – Larry Lee; Director of pro scouting – Kevin Colbert; Head coaches: Head coach – Wayne Fontes; Assistant head coach – Dave Levy; Assistant head coach/defense – John Teerlinck; Offensive coaches: Offensive coordinator – Tom Moore; Quarterbacks – Greg Landry; Running backs – Mo Forte; Receivers – Charlie Sanders; Tight ends/offensive assistant – Steve Kazor; Offensive line – Paul Boudreau	Defensive coaches: Defensive coordinator – Jim Eddy; Linebackers – Howard Tippett; Defensive backs – John Fontes; Defensive assistant/lbs and dbs – Don Clemons; Special teams coaches: Special teams – Frank Novak; Strength and conditioning: Strength and conditioning/special teams assistant – Bert Hill

=== Roster ===
1996 Detroit Lions roster
Quarterbacks (QB): 13 Johnny Johnson; 1 Don Majkowski; 19 Scott Mitchell; Running backs (RB): 26 Eric Lynch; 33 Glyn Milburn; 34 Ron Rivers; 20 Barry Sanders; 30 Cory Schlesinger FB; Wide receivers (WR): 17 Miles Macik; 83 Aubrey Matthews; 10 Kez McCorvey; 84 Herman Moore; 87 Johnnie Morton; 80 Brett Perriman; Tight ends (TE): 89 Pete Metzelaars; 82 Derek Price; 49 Eric Stocz	Offensive linemen (OL): 77 Mike Compton; 76 Scott Conover G/T; 53 Kevin Glover C; 74 Chris Harrison G; 64 Jeff Hartings G; 66 Hessley Hempstead C/G; 70 Jeff Jones T; 71 Zefross Moss T; 72 Ray Roberts T; 62 Tony Semple; Defensive linemen (DL): 96 Shane Bonham DT; 92 Shane Dronett DE; 94 Luther Elliss DT; 91 Robert Porcher DE; 97 Tracy Scroggins DE; 98 Henry Thomas DT; 93 Kerwin Waldroup DE; 90 Keith Washington DE; 95 Mike Wells DT	Linebackers (LB): 51 Tom Beer OLB; 59 Reggie Brown OLB; 99 Pepper Johnson; 51 Antonio London OLB; 52 Scott Kowalkowski OLB; Defensive backs (DB): 36 Bennie Blades SS; 27 Jocelyn Borgella CB; 44 Brad Ford CB; 25 Greg Jeffries CB; 39 Van Malone FS; 47 Ryan McNeil CB; 31 Corey Raymond CB; 28 Ron Rice SS; 42 Ryan Stewart S; 24 Richard Woodley CB; Special teams (ST): 4 Jason Hanson K; 3 Mark Royals P	Practice squad: 15 Tommie Boyd WR; 21 Allen Williams RB; 53 active, 3 inactive, 2 practice squad Reserve: 57 Stephen Boyd LB (IR); 81 Kevin Hickman TE (IR); 86 David Sloan TE (IR); Rookies in italics

== Regular season ==
=== Schedule ===
1996 was the first time since 1984 that the Lions played the San Diego Chargers, and the first time they had met the Philadelphia Eagles in the regular season since 1986. The reason for this is that before the admission of the Texans in 2002, NFL scheduling formulas for games outside a team’s division were much more influenced by table position during the previous season.

Week	Date	Opponent	Result	Record	Attendance
1	September 1	at **Minnesota Vikings**	**L** 17–13	0–1	52,972
2	September 8	**Tampa Bay Buccaneers**	**W** 21–6	1–1	54,229
3	September 15	at Philadelphia Eagles	**L** 24–17	1–2	66,007
4	September 22	**Chicago Bears**	**W** 35–16	2–2	70,022
5	September 29	at **Tampa Bay Buccaneers**	**W** 27–0	3–2	34,961
6	October 6	Atlanta Falcons	**W** 28–24	4–2	58,666
7	October 13	at Oakland Raiders	**L** 37–21	4–3	50,037
8	Bye				
9	October 27	New York Giants	**L** 35–7	4–4	63,501
10	November 3	at **Green Bay Packers**	**L** 28–18	4–5	60,695
11	November 11	at San Diego Chargers	**L** 27–21	4–6	60,425
12	November 17	Seattle Seahawks	**W** 17–16	5–6	51,194
13	November 24	at **Chicago Bears**	**L** 31–14	5–7	55,864
14	November 28	Kansas City Chiefs	**L** 28–24	5–8	75,079
15	December 8	**Minnesota Vikings**	**L** 24–22	5–9	46,043
16	December 15	**Green Bay Packers**	**L** 31–3	5–10	73,214
17	December 23	at San Francisco 49ers	**L** 24–14	5–11	61,921
Note: Intra-division opponents are in **bold** text.

=== Standings ===
NFC Central
	W	L	T	PCT	PF	PA	STK
^{(1)} Green Bay Packers	13	3	0	.813	456	210	W5
^{(6)} Minnesota Vikings	9	7	0	.563	298	315	L1
Chicago Bears	7	9	0	.438	283	305	L1
Tampa Bay Buccaneers	6	10	0	.375	221	293	W1
Detroit Lions	5	11	0	.313	302	368	L5
