= 1995 Detroit Lions season =

NFL team season

- Owner: William Clay Ford Sr.
- General manager: Chuck Schmidt
- Head coach: Wayne Fontes
- Offensive coordinator: Tom Moore
- Defensive coordinator: Herb Paterra
- Home stadium: Pontiac Silverdome

Results
- Record: 10–6
- Division place: 2nd NFC Central
- Playoffs: Lost Wild Card Playoffs (at Eagles) 37–58
- All-Pros: T Lomas Brown (1st team); WR Herman Moore (1st team); RB Barry Sanders (1st team); C Kevin Glover (2nd team)
- Pro Bowlers: C Kevin Glover; T Lomas Brown; WR Herman Moore; RB Barry Sanders

The 1995 Detroit Lions season was the team's 66th in the National Football League (NFL). Finishing at 10–6, it marked the Lions' third consecutive winning season, which had not been accomplished in Detroit since the team posted four consecutive winning seasons from 1969 to 1972. This feat would not be repeated until 2024.

It was also the Lions' third consecutive postseason appearance, and fourth in five seasons – the franchise’s best era since the 1950s.

The Lions started the season 0–3 and were 3–6 after a Week 10 loss in Atlanta. However, starting with a Week 11 win over Tampa Bay, the Lions won a franchise-record seven consecutive games to close out the season and clinch a playoff berth.

Herman Moore had a career season as he broke Cris Carter’s NFL record for most receptions in a season (123). Moore and teammate Brett Perriman (108 catches) became the first receiver duo to each have more than 100 receptions in the same season.

The Lions' 436 points scored was the most in franchise history until it was eclipsed by the 2011 team.

For the third consecutive year, however, the Lions could not win a playoff game and were eliminated as they were routed by the Philadelphia Eagles 58–37 in the Wild Card playoffs after falling behind 51–7. Leading up to their Wild Card game, Detroit offensive linemen Lomas Brown guaranteed a victory over the Eagles; however, that didn't age well.

The last remaining active member of the 1995 Detroit Lions was kicker Jason Hanson, who retired after the 2012 season.

== Offseason ==
Additions	Subtractions
DT Henry Thomas (Vikings)	QB Dave Krieg (Cardinals)
QB Don Majkowski (Colts)	LB Pat Swilling (Raiders)
T Zefross Moss (Colts)	DT Marc Spindler (Jets)
QB Donald Hollas (Bengals)	LB Broderick Thomas (Vikings)

=== 1995 expansion draft ===
Detroit Lions selected during the expansion draft
Round	Selection	Name	Position	Expansion team
17	34	Mark Rodenhauser	Center	Carolina Panthers
23	45	Harry Colon	Cornerback	Jacksonville Jaguars
24	48	Larry Ryans	Wide receiver	Carolina Panthers

=== NFL draft ===
1995 Detroit Lions draft
Round	Pick	Player	Position	College	Notes
1	20	Luther Elliss *	DT	Utah	
3	70	David Sloan *	TE	New Mexico	from St. Louis
5	141	Stephen Boyd *	LB	Boston College	from Seattle
5	156	Kez McCorvey	WR	Florida State	
5	163	Ronald Cherry	OT	McNeese State	from San Francisco
6	186	Kevin Hickman	TE	Navy	from Arizona
6	192	Cory Schlesinger *	FB	Nebraska	
7	228	Hessley Hempstead	G	Kansas	
Made roster * Made at least one Pro Bowl during career

Notes

- Detroit traded its second-round selection (51st) to San Diego in exchange for the Chargers' first-round selection in 1996.
- Detroit traded up from its third-round selection (82nd) with St. Louis for the Rams' second-round selection (70th), giving up its fourth-round selection (115th).
- Detroit received Seattle's fifth-round selection (141st) in exchange for WR Reggie Barrett.
- Detroit received San Francisco's fifth-round selection (163rd) in exchange for RB Derrick Moore.

=== Undrafted free agents ===
1995 undrafted free agents of note
Player	Position	College
Bryce Bevill	Cormerback	Syracuse
Brad Bowers	Defensive end	California
Tommie Boyd	Wide receiver	Toledo
Mill Coleman	Wide receiver	Michigan State
Kevin Dixson	Wide receiver	Illinois State
Mark Hatfield	Tackle	Bishop’s, Ontario, Canada
Jeff Jones	Tackle	Texas A&M
Darryl Major	Linebacker	Missouri
Randy Nonhoff	Guard	California
Kyle Pooler	Kicker	Missouri
Ron Rice	Safety	Eastern Michigan
Willie Smith	Linebacker	Penn State
Josh Taves	Defensive end	Northeastern
Earnest Williams	Running back	Fort Hays State

== Personnel ==
=== Staff ===
1995 Detroit Lions staff
Front office: Owner and president – William Clay Ford Sr.; Vice chairman – William Clay Ford Jr.; Executive vice president and chief operating officer – Chuck Schmidt; Director of player personnel – Ron Hughes; Director of pro scouting – Kevin Colbert; Head coaches: Head coach – Wayne Fontes; Assistant head coach – Dave Levy; Assistant head coach/defense – John Teerlinck; Offensive coaches: Offensive coordinator – Tom Moore; Quarterbacks – Greg Landry; Running backs – Mo Forte; Receivers – Charlie Sanders; Tight ends/offensive assistant – Steve Kazor; Offensive line – Paul Boudreau	Defensive coaches: Defensive coordinator – Herb Paterra; Linebackers – Don Clemons; Outside linebackers – Howard Tippett; Defensive backs – John Fontes; Special teams coaches: Special teams – Frank Novak; Strength and conditioning: Strength and conditioning/defensive assistant – Bert Hill

=== Roster ===
1995 Detroit Lions roster
Quarterbacks (QB): 14 Kent Graham; 1 Don Majkowski; 19 Scott Mitchell; Running backs (RB): 48 Tom Beer FB; 26 Eric Lynch; 34 Ron Rivers KR; 20 Barry Sanders; 30 Cory Schlesinger FB; 21 Allen Williams; Wide receivers (WR): 83 Aubrey Matthews; 10 Kez McCorvey; 84 Herman Moore; 87 Johnnie Morton; 80 Brett Perriman PR; Tight ends (TE): 82 Rodney Holman; 86 David Sloan	Offensive linemen (OL): 75 Lomas Brown T; 74 Mike Compton; 76 Scott Conover T; 53 Kevin Glover C; 66 Hessley Hempstead C; 70 Jeff Jones T; 73 Dave Lutz G; 71 Zefross Moss T; 62 Tony Semple; 67 Doug Widell G; Defensive linemen (DL): 96 Shane Bonham DT; 94 Luther Elliss DE; 90 Dan Owens DE; 91 Robert Porcher DT; 97 Tracy Scroggins DE; 92 Josh Taves DE; 98 Henry Thomas DT; 95 Mike Wells DT	Linebackers (LB): 57 Stephen Boyd MLB; 99 Tracy Hayworth OLB; 59 Mike Johnson OLB; 52 Scott Kowalkowski MLB; 55 Antonio London OLB; 54 Chris Spielman MLB; Defensive backs (DB): 36 Bennie Blades FS; 27 Jocelyn Borgella CB; 32 Willie Clay; 25 Greg Jeffries CB; 40 Robert Massey CB; 47 Ryan McNeil CB; 39 Van Malone FS; 31 Corey Raymond CB; 28 Ron Rice SS; 29 Sean Vanhorse CB; 24 Richard Woodley CB; Special teams (ST): 4 Jason Hanson K; 3 Mark Royals P	Practice squad: 15 Tommie Boyd WR; 18 Ben Bronson WR; 45 Willie Smith LB; Reserve: 79 Ryan Grigson T (IR); 89 Ron Hall TE (IR); 46 Kevin Hickman TE (IR); Rookies in italics, 3 practice squad

== Regular season ==
=== Schedule ===
Week	Date	Opponent	Result	Record	Attendance
1	September 3	at Pittsburgh Steelers	**L** 23–20	0–1	58,002
2	September 10	at **Minnesota Vikings**	**L** 20–10	0–2	52,234
3	September 17	Arizona Cardinals	**L** 20–17	0–3	58,727
4	September 25	San Francisco 49ers	**W** 27–24	1–3	76,236
5	Bye				
6	October 8	Cleveland Browns	**W** 38–20	2–3	74,171
7	October 15	at **Green Bay Packers**	**L** 30–21	2–4	60,302
8	October 22	at Washington Redskins	**L** 36–30 _{(OT)}	2–5	52,332
9	October 29	**Green Bay Packers**	**W** 24–16	3–5	73,462
10	November 5	at Atlanta Falcons	**L** 34–22	3–6	49,619
11	November 12	**Tampa Bay Buccaneers**	**W** 27–24	4–6	60,644
12	November 19	at **Chicago Bears**	**W** 24–17	5–6	61,779
13	November 23	**Minnesota Vikings**	**W** 44–38	6–6	74,559
14	December 4	**Chicago Bears**	**W** 27–7	7–6	77,230
15	December 10	at Houston Oilers	**W** 24–17	8–6	35,842
16	December 17	Jacksonville Jaguars	**W** 44–0	9–6	70,204
17	December 23	at **Tampa Bay Buccaneers**	**W** 37–10	10–6	50,049
Note: Intra-division opponents are in **bold** text.

=== Season summary ===
==== Week 1: @ Pittsburgh Steelers ====
Week 1: Pittsburgh Steelers VS Detroit Lions

Quarter	1	2	3	4	Total
Lions	0	10	0	10	**20**
**Steelers**	0	3	7	10	**20**

at Three Rivers Stadium, Pittsburgh, Pennsylvania

- Date: September 3, 1995
- Game time: 1:00 p.m. EST
- Game weather: Overcast, 67 °F (19 °C)
- Game attendance: 58,002
- TV announcers (FOX): Kevin Harlan, Jerry Glanville and Pam Oliver

Game information

**First quarter**

**Second quarter**

**Third quarter**

**Fourth quarter**

Top passers

- DET – Scott Mitchell – 18/32, 195 yards, 2 TD, 1 INT
- PIT – Mike Tomczak – 15/24, 149 yards, 3 INT

Top rushers

- DET – Barry Sanders – 21 rushes, 108 yards
- PIT – Bam Morris – 17 rushes, 50 yards, 2 TD

Top receivers

- DET – Herman Moore – 10 receptions, 131 yards, 1 TD
- PIT – Yancey Thigpen – 7 receptions, 91 yards

==== Week 13 ====
Team	1	2	3	4	Total
Vikings	7	21	3	7	38
• Lions	14	10	10	10	44

- Date: November 23
- Location: Pontiac Silverdome
- Game start: 12:30 p.m. EST
- Game attendance: 74,559
- Game weather: Indoors (dome)

Scoring summary
Q1		DET	Perriman 2 yard pass from Mitchell (Hanson kick)	DET 7–0
Q1	1:56	DET	Perriman 20 yard pass from Mitchell (Hanson kick)	DET 14–0
Q1		MIN	Reed 55 yard pass from Moon (Reveiz kick)	DET 14–7
Q2		DET	Morton 16 yard pass from Mitchell (Hanson kick)	DET 21–7
Q2		MIN	Palmer 74 yard punt return (Reveiz kick)	DET 21–14
Q2	7:53	MIN	Thomas 17 yard fumble return (Reveiz kick)	Tie 21–21
Q2		DET	Hanson 32 yard field goal	DET 24–21
Q2		MIN	Carter 10 yard pass from Moon (Reveiz kick)	MIN 28–24
Q3		MIN	Reveiz 49 yard field goal	MIN 31–24
Q3		DET	Hanson 40 yard field goal	MIN 31–27
Q3	8:48	DET	Moore 27 yard pass from Mitchell (Hanson kick)	DET 34–31
Q4		DET	Sanders 50 yard run (Hanson kick)	DET 41–31
Q4		MIN	Carter 7 yard pass from Moon (Reveiz kick)	DET 41–38
Q4		DET	Hanson 39 yard field goal	DET 44–38

- Scott Mitchell 30/45, 410 Yds
- Barry Sanders 24 Rush, 138 Yds
- Herman Moore 12 Rec, 153 Yds
- Brett Perriman 8 Rec, 127 Yds
- Johnnie Morton 7 Rec, 102 Yds

=== Standings ===
NFC Central
	W	L	T	PCT	PF	PA	STK
^{(3)} Green Bay Packers	11	5	0	.688	404	314	W2
^{(5)} Detroit Lions	10	6	0	.625	436	336	W7
Chicago Bears	9	7	0	.563	392	360	W2
Minnesota Vikings	8	8	0	.500	412	385	L2
Tampa Bay Buccaneers	7	9	0	.438	238	335	L2

== Playoffs ==
=== NFC Wild Card Game: At Philadelphia Eagles ===
NFC Wild Card Game: Detroit Lions at Philadelphia Eagles – Game summary

Quarter	1	2	3	4	Total
Lions	7	0	14	16	37
Eagles	7	31	13	7	58

at Veterans Stadium, Philadelphia

- Date: December 30, 1995
- Game time: 4:00 p.m. EST
- Game attendance: 66,099
- Referee: Ron Blum
- TV announcers (ABC): Al Michaels, Frank Gifford, and Dan Dierdorf

Game information

First quarter

- PHI – Charlie Garner 15 yard rush (Gary Anderson kick). Eagles 7–0
- DET – David Sloan 32 yard pass from Scott Mitchell (Jason Hanson kick). Tie 7–7

Second quarter

- PHI – Gary Anderson 21 yard field goal. Eagles 10–7
- PHI – Fred Barnett 22 yard pass from Rodney Peete (Gary Anderson kick). Eagles 17–7
- PHI – Barry Wilburn 24 yard interception return (Gary Anderson kick). Eagles 24–7
- PHI – Ricky Watters 1 yard rush (Gary Anderson kick). Eagles 31–7
- PHI – Rob Carpenter 43 yard pass from Rodney Peete (Gary Anderson kick). Eagles 38–7

Third quarter

- PHI – Ricky Watters 45 yard pass from Rodney Peete (Gary Anderson kick). Eagles 45–7
- PHI – Gary Anderson 31 yard field goal. Eagles 48–7
- PHI – Gary Anderson 39 yard field goal. Eagles 51–7
- DET – Herman Moore 68 yard pass from Don Majkowski (Jason Hanson kick). Eagles 51–14
- DET – Johnnie Morton 7 yard pass from Don Majkowski (Jason Hanson kick). Eagles 51–21

Fourth quarter

- PHI – William Thomas 30 yard interception return (Gary Anderson kick). Eagles 58–21
- DET – David Sloan 2 yard pass from Don Majkowski (Ron Rivers run). Eagles 58–29
- DET – Ron Rivers 1 yard run (Herman Moore pass from Don Majkowski). Eagles 58–37

Top passers

- DET – Don Majkowski – 14/23, 206 yards, 3 TD, 2 INT
- PHI – Rodney Peete – 17/25, 270 yards, 3 TD

Top rushers

- DET – Barry Sanders – 10 rushes, 40 yards
- PHI – Ricky Watters – 18 rushes, 49 yards, 1 TD

Top receivers

- DET – Herman Moore – 7 rec, 133 yards, 1 TD
- PHI – Fred Barnett – 8 rec, 109 yards, 1 TD

Turnovers

- DET – 7
- PHI – 1

The Eagles scored 31 points in the second quarter, recorded six interceptions, forced seven total turnovers and held future Hall of Fame running back Barry Sanders to just 40 rushing yards en route to a 58–37 victory in the second highest scoring game in NFL postseason history, which was also the first occasion the Lions had played the Eagles since 1986. The two teams combined for 874 total yards of offense.

== Awards and honors ==
- Scott Mitchell, Thanksgiving Day Record, Most passing yards by a Lions quarterback, 410 yards
- Herman Moore, Single Season Record, Most Receptions in a Season
- Barry Sanders, All-Pro
- Barry Sanders, NFC Pro Bowl Selection

=== Milestones ===
- Barry Sanders, 7th consecutive 1000 yard season
- Herman Moore, 100 reception season,
