= 1998 Detroit Lions season =

NFL team season

- Owner: William Clay Ford Sr.
- General manager: Chuck Schmidt
- Head coach: Bobby Ross
- Home stadium: Pontiac Silverdome

Results
- Record: 5–11
- Division place: 4th NFC Central
- Playoffs: Did not qualify
- All-Pros: 1: RB Barry Sanders (2nd team)
- Pro Bowlers: 3: RB Barry Sanders; DT Luther Elliss; DE Robert Porcher

Uniform

The 1998 Detroit Lions season was their 69th in the National Football League (NFL). The team failed to improve upon their previous season's output of 9–7 and did not make a repeat playoff appearance, instead posting their third 5–11 mark in seven seasons. This was the last season Barry Sanders would play in the NFL.

== Offseason ==
Additions	Subtractions
C Jim Pyne (Buccaneers)	WR/KR Glyn Milburn (Bears)
LB Allen Aldridge (Broncos)	DT Shane Bonham (49ers)
LB Rob Fredrickson (Raiders)	TE Pete Metzelaars (retirement)
	DT Mike Wells (Bears)

=== NFL draft ===
1998 Detroit Lions draft
Round	Pick	Player	Position	College	Notes
1	20	Terry Fair	Defensive back	Tennessee	
2	50	Germane Crowell	Wide receiver	Virginia	
2	60	Charlie Batch	Quarterback	Eastern Michigan	
6	185	Jamaal Alexander	Defensive back	Southern Miss	
7	207	Chris Liwienski	Tackle	Indiana	
Made roster * Made at least one Pro Bowl during career

=== Undrafted free agents ===
1998 undrafted free agents of note
Player	Position	College
Tutu Atwell	Wide receiver	Minnesota
Kerlin Blaise	Guard	Miami (FL)
Lamar Campbell	Cornerback	Wisconsin
Kywin Supernaw	Defensive back	Indiana
Travis Reece	Running back	Michigan State
Corey Thomas	Wide Receiver	Duke

== Personnel ==
=== Staff ===
1998 Detroit Lions staff
Front office: Owner and chairman – William Clay Ford Sr.; Vice chairman – William Clay Ford Jr.; Executive vice president and coo – Chuck Schmidt; Vice president of football operations – Larry Lee; Vice president of player personnel – Ron Hughes; Director of pro scouting – Kevin Colbert; Head coaches: Head coach – Bobby Ross; Offensive coaches: Offensive coordinator – Sylvester Croom; Quarterbacks – Jim Zorn; Running backs – Frank Falks; Wide receivers – Jerry Sullivan; Tight ends – Bob Palcic; Offensive line – Jack Henry; Offensive assistant – Stan Kwan; Quality control/offense – John Misciagna	Defensive coaches: Defensive coordinator – Larry Peccatiello; Defensive line – Brian Baker; Linebackers – Gary Moeller; Defensive backs – Richard Selcer; Defensive assistant – Don Clemons; Quality control/defense – Dennis Murphy; Special teams coaches: Special teams – Chuck Priefer; Special teams assistant – Stan Kwan; Strength and conditioning: Strength and conditioning – Bert Hill

=== Roster ===
1998 Detroit Lions roster
Quarterbacks (QB): 13 Chris Dittoe; 19 Scott Mitchell; 14 Frank Reich; Running backs (RB): 21 Jerris McPhail; 36 Travis Reece; 34 Ron Rivers; 20 Barry Sanders; 30 Cory Schlesinger FB; 44 Tommy Vardell FB; Wide receivers (WR): 80 Tommie Boyd; 82 Germane Crowell; 84 Herman Moore; 87 Johnnie Morton; 83 Brian Stablein; 15 Corey Thomas; Tight ends (TE): 81 Pete Chryplewicz; 89 Walter Rasby; 86 David Sloan	Offensive linemen (OL): 79 Eric Beverly C; 77 Mike Compton; 64 Jeff Hartings G; 70 Andre Johnson G/T; 61 Jim Pyne C; 75 Tony Ramirez T; 72 Ray Roberts T; 62 Tony Semple G; 71 Larry Tharpe T; Defensive linemen (DL): 95 Mike Chalenski DE; 94 Luther Elliss DT; 73 Darius Holland DT; 91 Robert Porcher DE; 98 Don Sasa DT; 97 Tracy Scroggins DE; 92 Marc Spindler DT; 93 Kerwin Waldroup DE	Linebackers (LB): 55 Allen Aldridge; 53 Rob Fredrickson OLB; 58 George Jamison OLB; 99 Richard Jordan MLB; 52 Scott Kowalkowski OLB; 59 Kevin O'Neill MLB; Defensive backs (DB): 24 Kevin Abrams CB; 35 Robert Bailey CB; 39 Lamar Campbell CB/S; 27 Mark Carrier FS; 23 Terry Fair; 25 Greg Jeffries FS; 28 Ron Rice SS; 42 Ryan Stewart SS; 29 Kywin Supernaw SS; 32 Bryant Westbrook CB; Special teams (ST): 4 Jason Hanson K; 18 John Jett P	Practice squad: -- Brad Keeney DT; 26 Brock Olivo FB; -- Deron Thorp T; 53 active, 11 inactive, 3 practice squad Reserve: 10 Charlie Batch QB (IR); 65 Kerlin Blaise G (IR); 57 Stephen Boyd LB (IR); 69 Jerome Davis T (IR); 66 Hessley Hempstead G (IR); 67 Travis Kirschke DE (IR); 90 Dan Owens DT (IR); 73 Juan Roque T (IR); 54 Matt Russell LB (IR); 49 Eric Stocz TE (IR); 96 Henry Taylor DT (IR); Rookies in italics

== Regular season ==
=== Schedule ===
Week	Date	Opponent	Result	Record	Venue	Attendance
1	September 6	at **Green Bay Packers**	**L** 19–38	0–1	Lambeau Field	60,102
2	September 13	Cincinnati Bengals	**L** 28–34 (OT)	0–2	Pontiac Silverdome	66,354
3	September 20	at **Minnesota Vikings**	**L** 6–29	0–3	Hubert H. Humphrey Metrodome	63,107
4	September 28	**Tampa Bay Buccaneers**	**W** 27–6	1–3	Pontiac Silverdome	74,724
5	October 4	at **Chicago Bears**	**L** 27–31	1–4	Soldier Field	66,944
6	Bye					
7	October 15	**Green Bay Packers**	**W** 27–20	2–4	Pontiac Silverdome	77,932
8	October 25	**Minnesota Vikings**	**L** 13–34	2–5	Pontiac Silverdome	77,885
9	November 1	Arizona Cardinals	**L** 15–17	2–6	Pontiac Silverdome	66,087
10	November 8	at Philadelphia Eagles	**L** 9–10	2–7	Veterans Stadium	66,785
11	November 15	**Chicago Bears**	**W** 26–3	3–7	Pontiac Silverdome	63,152
12	November 22	at **Tampa Bay Buccaneers**	**W** 28–25	4–7	Raymond James Stadium	64,265
13	November 26	Pittsburgh Steelers	**W** 19–16 (OT)	5–7	Pontiac Silverdome	78,139
14	December 6	at Jacksonville Jaguars	**L** 22–37	5–8	Alltel Stadium	70,717
15	December 14	at San Francisco 49ers	**L** 13–35	5–9	3Com Park	68,585
16	December 20	Atlanta Falcons	**L** 17–24	5–10	Pontiac Silverdome	67,143
17	December 27	at Baltimore Ravens	**L** 10–19	5–11	Raven Stadium	68,045
Note: Intra-division opponents are in **bold** text.

=== Standings ===
NFC Central
	W	L	T	PCT	PF	PA	STK
^{(1)} Minnesota Vikings	15	1	0	.938	556	296	W8
^{(5)} Green Bay Packers	11	5	0	.688	408	319	W3
Tampa Bay Buccaneers	8	8	0	.500	314	295	W1
Detroit Lions	5	11	0	.313	306	378	L4
Chicago Bears	4	12	0	.250	276	368	L1

=== Season summary ===
==== Week 1 ====
Week One: Detroit Lions (0–0) at Green Bay Packers (0–0)

Quarter	1	2	3	4	Total
Lions	3	3	13	0	**19**
**Packers**	10	7	7	14	**38**

at Lambeau Field, Green Bay, Wisconsin

- Date: September 6, 1998
- Game time: 1:00 p.m. EST
- Game weather: 74 °F or 23.3 °C
- Game attendance: 60,102
- TV announcers (Fox): Dick Stockton and Matt Millen
- Pro-Football-Reference.com, The Football Database

Game information

**First quarter**

- GB – Ryan Longwell 32-yard field goal, 9:19. Packers 3–0. **Drive: 11 plays, 58 yards, 5:41.**
- GB – LeRoy Butler 32-yard interception return (Ryan Longwell kick), 6:23. Packers 10–0.
- DET – Jason Hanson 47-yard field goal, 1:10. Packers 10–3. **Drive: 10 plays, 51 yards, 5:13.**

**Second quarter**

- GB – Dorsey Levens 4-yard run (Ryan Longwell kick), 9:40. Packers 17–3. **Drive: 13 plays, 80 yards, 6:30.**
- DET – Jason Hanson 43-yard field goal. Packers 17–6. **Drive: 11 plays, 63 yards, 2:11.**

**Third quarter**

- DET – Herman Moore 25-yard pass from Scott Mitchell (pass failed), 12:39. Packers 17–12. **Drive: 7 plays, 50 yards, 2:21.**
- GB – Antonio Freeman 6-yard pass from Brett Favre (Ryan Longwell kick), 0:17. Packers 24–12. **Drive: 18 plays, 85 yards, 9:34.**
- DET – Terry Fair 101-yard kickoff return (Jason Hanson kick), 0:00. Packers 24–19.

**Fourth quarter**

- GB – Roell Preston 100-yard kickoff return (Ryan Longwell kick), 14:38. Packers 31–19.
- GB – Antonio Freeman 84-yard pass from Brett Favre (Ryan Longwell kick), 1:53. Packers 38–19. **Drive: 3 plays, 86 yards, 0:29.**

Top passers

- DET – Scott Mitchell – 23/44, 248 yards, TD, INT
- GB – Brett Favre – 24/32, 277 yards, 2 TD

Top rushers

- DET – Barry Sanders – 17 rushes, 70 yards
- GB – Dorsey Levens – 25 rushes, 59 yards, TD

Top receivers

- DET – Herman Moore – 9 receptions, 100 yards, TD
- GB – Antonio Freeman – 4 receptions, 110 yards, 2 TD

==== Week 13 (Thanksgiving) ====
Week Thirteen: Pittsburgh Steelers (7-4) at Detroit Lions (4–7)

Quarter	1	2	3	4	OT	Total
Steelers	0	6	7	3	0	**16**
**Lions**	0	3	3	10	3	**19**

at Pontiac Silverdome, Pontiac, Michigan

- Date: November 26, 1998
- Game time: 12:30 p.m. EST
- Game weather: Dome
- Game attendance: 78,139
- Referee: Phil Luckett
- TV announcers (CBS): Greg Gumbel (play by play), Phil Simms (color commentator), Armen Keteyian (Sideline Reporter)
- , The Football Database

Game information
**First quarter**
- No scoring

**Second quarter**

- PIT – Norm Johnson 30-yd FG
- PIT – Norm Johnson 38-yd FG
- DET – Jason Hanson 45-yd FG

**Third quarter**

- PIT – Will Blackwell 24-yd pass from Kordell Stewart (Norm Johnson kick)
- DET – Jason Hanson 52-yd FG

**Fourth quarter**

- DET – Herman Moore 21-yd pass from Charlie Batch (Jason Hanson kick)
- DET – Jason Hanson 35-yd FG
- PIT – Norm Johnson 25-yd FG

**Overtime**

- DET – Jason Hanson 42-yd FG

== Awards and Records ==
Barry Sanders retired as the second leading rusher in NFL history.

- 15,269 yards.
- 109 touchdowns
- 5.0 average per rush attempt
