= Wayne Fontes =

American football player and coach (born 1940)

No. 26
- Positions: Defensive back, running back

Personal information
- Born: February 17, 1940 (age 86); New Bedford, Massachusetts, U.S.
- Listed height: 6 ft 0 in (1.83 m)
- Listed weight: 190 lb (86 kg)

Career information
- High school: Wareham (Wareham, Massachusetts); McKinley (Canton, Ohio)
- College: Michigan State (1958–1961)
- NFL draft: 1961: 9th round, 126th overall pick
- AFL draft: 1961: 22nd round, 173rd overall pick

Career history

Playing
- New York Titans (1962); Philadelphia Eagles (1963)*
- * Offseason or practice squad member only

Coaching
- Iowa (1969–1970) Assistant coach; USC (1972–1975) Assistant coach; Tampa Bay Buccaneers (1976–1981) Assistant coach; Tampa Bay Buccaneers (1982–1984) Defensive coordinator; Detroit Lions (1985–1988) Defensive coordinator; Detroit Lions (1988–1996) Head coach

Awards and highlights
- First-team All-Big Ten (1962); AP NFL Coach of the Year (1991); Pro Football Weekly NFL Coach of the Year (1991); Greasy Neal Award (1991); UPI NFC Coach of the Year (1991)

Head coaching record
- Regular season: 66–67 (.496)
- Postseason: 1–4 (.200)
- Career: 67–71 (.486)
- Coaching profile at Pro Football Reference
- Stats at Pro Football Reference

Wayne Howard Joseph Fontes (/fɒnts/; born February 17, 1940) is an American former professional football player and coach. He was the head coach of the National Football League (NFL)'s Detroit Lions from 1988 to 1996. He is the longest tenured head coach in team history. His 67 wins and 71 losses are each the most for a head coach in team history. Fontes played as a defensive back for the New York Titans of the American Football League (AFL).

== Background and early career ==
Fontes was born in New Bedford, Massachusetts. He is of Portuguese descent. Fontes grew up in Canton, Ohio where he played football, basketball, and baseball at McKinley High School. He attended Michigan State University where he was an All-Big Ten defensive back. He graduated from MSU in 1962.

After he was taken 126th overall in the ninth round of the 1961 NFL draft by the Philadelphia Eagles, Fontes played one year for the New York Titans of the American Football League. Fontes played nine games for the Titans in the 1962 season as a defensive back, recording four interceptions. He returned one interception 83 yards for a touchdown, a franchise record that would stand for 27 years.

After playing one season for the Titans, he injured his posterior cruciate ligament, and returned to Michigan State to obtain a Master's degree. He became an assistant coach at Michigan State in 1963. He then coached high school football and basketball at Bay City, Michigan's Visitation High School for two years losing only two games in his first year in 1964, and his team was undefeated in his second year in 1965, winning their league championship. He later left for the University of Dayton to serve under head coach John McVay. He also served as an assistant coach at the University of Iowa and for John McKay at Southern California. He ultimately developed a close relationship with McKay after working under his wing at USC, and went on to work as the defensive coordinator and defensive backs coach of the Tampa Bay Buccaneers from 1982 to 1984.

In the fall of 1987, Fontes pleaded guilty to driving while intoxicated after an incident in which he was originally also charged with possession of cocaine. The more serious charge was dropped, however.

== Head coach ==
After 13 seasons as an assistant in the NFL, Fontes took over the Lions as interim head coach mid-season in 1988 after head coach Darryl Rogers was fired. Fontes was regarded as somewhat of an up-and-comer in NFL coaching circles during his time in Tampa Bay as defensive backs coach under John McKay, and became a highly regarded ball skill and positioning educator for defensive backs in the "3–4" defense.

A personable "player's coach" and excellent motivator, Fontes was a key hire by Darryl Rogers, and would ultimately go on to coach Detroit for another seven seasons. The Lions were primed for success after William Clay Ford handed the job to Fontes in 1988, and the ownership pulled out all the stops – drafting Pro Bowl-caliber players such as Barry Sanders, Chris Spielman, Robert Porcher, Luther Elliss, Lomas Brown, Bennie Blades, Jason Hanson, Jerry Ball, Herman Moore, Kevin Glover, and Rodney Peete.

Detroit also made aggressive moves in free agency during this time, signing quarterback Scott Mitchell, who had previously been Dan Marino's backup in Miami, and Pat Swilling, who was acquired from the Saints for a first-round draft pick.

During Fontes' tenure, The Lions would have their most successful stretch since the AFL-NFL Merger, making the playoffs in 1991, 1993, 1994, and 1995 under his leadership.

Fontes coached the 1991 and 1993 teams to the NFC Central Division title, with the latter being the franchise's last division championship until they won the NFC North in 2023.

The stretch from 1993 to 1995 was the first time the franchise had three straight winning seasons since the team posted four consecutive winning seasons from 1969 to 1972, a mark that would not be matched until 2024.

The three straight postseason appearances – and four in five seasons – was the franchise's best run since the 1950s.

The 1991 Lions won 12 regular season games, which was a franchise record that would not be matched until 2023 and would be surpassed the following year.

They defeated the Dallas Cowboys 38–6 in the Divisional Playoffs for the franchise's first postseason victory since 1957 and only one until 2023. The Lions lost in the NFC Championship game to eventual Super Bowl Champion Washington.

Fontes earned NFL Coach of the Year honors through the Associated Press and United Press International. Fontes' teams were known for their resilience in the regular season, finishing the 1991 season with six consecutive wins and the 1995 season with a franchise-record seven straight wins after starting the season 3–6.

Unfortunately for Fontes, the Lions were unable to find consistent success in the postseason after 1991, losing in the Wildcard rounds in 1993, 1994, and 1995 – and missing the postseason in 1992 and 1996.

Fontes was fired after going 5–11 in 1996. Fontes' 66 regular season wins – and 67 losses – are the most in franchise's history.

== Head coaching record ==
Team	Year	Regular season					Postseason			
Team	Year	Won	Lost	Ties	Win %	Finish	Won	Lost	Win %	Result
DET	1988	2	3	0	.400	4th in NFC Central	–	–		
DET	1989	7	9	0	.438	3rd in NFC Central	–	–		
DET	1990	6	10	0	.375	3rd in NFC Central	–	–		
DET	1991	12	4	0	.750	1st in NFC Central	1	1	.500	Lost to Washington Redskins in NFC Championship Game
DET	1992	5	11	0	.313	5th in NFC Central	–	–		
DET	1993	10	6	0	.625	1st in NFC Central	0	1	.000	Lost to Green Bay Packers in NFC Wild Card Game
DET	1994	9	7	0	.563	3rd in NFC Central	0	1	.000	Lost to Green Bay Packers in NFC Wild Card Game
DET	1995	10	6	0	.625	2nd in NFC Central	0	1	.000	Lost to Philadelphia Eagles in NFC Wild Card Game
DET	1996	5	11	0	.313	5th in NFC Central	-	–	–	
Total		66	67	0	.496		1	4	.200	

== Legacy ==
Fontes' ability to survive rumors of being fired earned him nicknames like "Cocaine Wayne" (resulting from a car accident in Oct. 1987 where he was arrested for possession), "Big Buck" (stemming from a comparison he made between his job security and a hunted buck deer) and "Rasputin" (coined by Chris Berman due to Fontes' apparent ability to "miraculously" coax a winning streak out of his team every time he was about to be fired). Berman also referred to him as the "Nanook of the North" because of Fontes' desire to bundle up so heavily in the winter cold. He has also been referred to as "Mr. Snuffleupagus", due to his resemblance to the "Sesame Street" character of the same name. Fontes was also the brunt of many media jokes. Jokes like "Mr. Fontes is an expert in primary colors and beige" reflect the lack of respect that haunted his tenure.

Fontes was regarded as very personable, often joking with the media about his precarious job situation. He drew the line for this comedy though after the Detroit Free Press ridiculed him for sporting Mickey Mouse ears at a Disney charity. The Free Press ran a tongue-in-cheek multiple choice quiz as to why he was wearing them the following day. The offbeat answers ranged from "Wearing his thinking cap" to "President of the Mouse Davis fan club". An irate Fontes slammed the media for making such a personal attack against him in such bad taste. He said, "It ain't funny....if you don't like me, tell me. That's bull. Didn't like it at all. I did something for charity and for kids, and I'll keep doing things for charity and for kids." This strong sense of compassion and sacrifice for others is what endeared most players to him. The players responded to Fontes and always came to his defense when the coach fell into the "firing line".

Fontes' popularity waned in the later years of his career with the Lions. Many local media outlets and fans were openly critical of Fontes, correctly noting he amassed the most losses of any coach in Lions' history and that his overall record was under .500 – while downplaying that he also had the most wins, and had a winning record in seven full seasons. The desolate years of mediocrity prior to Fontes seemed to be an afterthought, as was Fontes' role as a long time assistant in that mediocrity. Many felt the Lions were underachieving and that a change in leadership to a firm disciplinarian, such as Bobby Ross, would produce better results. The move backfired as Ross was never able to build a strong relationship with superstar running back Barry Sanders. It is widely speculated that the hiring of Ross accelerated the retirement of Sanders, who was very close with Fontes. In ESPN's SportsCentury video on Barry Sanders, Sanders' father confirmed that his son contemplated retiring before the start of the 1997 season, which was to be Ross' first season as Lions coach. In his autobiography, "Now You See Him", Sanders says of Wayne Fontes: "I thought he deserved another chance." (ISBN 1-57860-139-8 p. 97)

Prior to the 2023 season, Fontes was the only Lions coach to lead the team to a NFC championship game and the lone coach post-merger to win a postseason game. He led them to the playoffs in four out of eight seasons while he was head coach, including three consecutive playoff berths (1993, 1994, and 1995). He left the Lions compiling the most wins in franchise history (67), most playoff appearances (4), and is 9th (out of 23 coaches) in total win percentage.

It was rumored that Fontes drafted Barry Sanders in 1989 against the wishes of other members of the Lions staff, and accounts from some contemporaries do indicate that Fontes was definitely focused on acquiring Sanders. Barry Sanders made a point to thank Fontes for his guidance in his Pro Football Hall of Fame induction speech. The mutual admiration and respect between Fontes and Sanders was very strong and transcended beyond the football field. Toward the end of his time in Detroit, an anti-Fontes sentiment grew among some Lions team members, but Sanders remained a staunch supporter of the coach. Of Fontes, Sanders said: "He proves that a coach can show affection and appreciation and still win." Sanders, to this day, credits Fontes for making him a superstar running back.

Fontes still supports local Detroit charities on occasion with his former players although those opportunities have been fewer as of late. After serving briefly as a color commentator on the English-language broadcasts of NFL Europe games, Fontes retired to his home in Tarpon Springs, Florida. He is frequently spotted at Tampa Bay Buccaneers games where he maintains a strong friendship with Jim Gruden, father of former Buccaneers head coach Jon Gruden.

== See also ==
- List of American Football League players
