= 1992 Detroit Lions season =

NFL team season

- Owner: William Clay Ford Sr.
- General manager: Chuck Schmidt
- Head coach: Wayne Fontes
- Offensive coordinator: Dan Henning
- Defensive coordinator: Woody Widenhofer
- Home stadium: Pontiac Silverdome

Results
- Record: 5–11
- Division place: 5th NFC Central
- Playoffs: Did not qualify

The 1992 Detroit Lions season was the 63rd season in franchise history. After going 12–4 from the 1991 season, the Lions took a step back as they posted a disappointing 5-11 record despite another Pro Bowl season from Barry Sanders, who passed Billy Sims for the franchise record in rushing on November 22. The Lions were expected to once again challenge for the NFC title. However, that did not happen, as they failed to qualify for the playoffs. It would be the first season the franchise would have involving kicker Jason Hanson. He would play 21 seasons as a Lion, a franchise record.

== Offseason ==
Additions	Subtractions
TE Jimmie Johnson (Redskins)	CB Terry Taylor (Browns)
	K Eddie Murray (Chiefs)
	LB Anthony Bell (Raiders)
	S Bruce Alexander (Dolphins)
	DE Jeff Hunter (Dolphins)

=== NFL draft ===
1992 Detroit Lions draft
Round	Pick	Player	Position	College	Notes
1	26	Robert Porcher *	DE	South Carolina State	
2	53	Tracy Scroggins	DE	Tulsa	
2	56	Jason Hanson *	K	Washington State	from Dallas
3	81	Thomas McLemore	TE	Southern	
6	145	Larry Tharpe	OT	Tennessee State	from New England
8	221	Willie Clay	S	Georgia Tech	
11	306	Ed Tillison	RB	NW Missouri	
Made roster * Made at least one Pro Bowl during career

Notes

- Detroit traded up from its third-round selection (82nd) with Dallas for the Cowboys' second-round selection (56th), giving up its fourth- and ninth-round selections (190th and 250th) in return.
- Detroit received Denver's third-round selection (81st) in return for OT Harvey Salem.
- Detroit's fifth-round pick (138th) was traded to New Orleans in exchange for WR Brett Perriman.
- Detroit traded up from its sixth-round selection (165th) with New England for the Patriots' sixth-round selection (145th), giving up its seventh-, tenth- and twelfth-round selections (194th, 277th and 333rd) in return.

=== Undrafted free agents ===
1992 undrafted free agents of note
Player	Position	College
Darrell Brooks	Center	Tennessee State
Tony Crutchfield	Defensive Back	BYU
John Derby	Linebacker	Iowa
Ken Ealy	Wide receiver	Central Michigan
Darrin Eaton	Wide receiver	Michigan State
Earnest Fields	Linebacker	Tennessee
Eric Lynch	Running back	Grand Valley State
Mike Riley	Punter	Mississippi State
Ed Thomas	Wide receiver	Indiana
Bernard Wilson	Defensive tackle	Tennessee State

== Personnel ==
=== Staff ===
1992 Detroit Lions staff
Front office: Owner and president – William Clay Ford Sr.; Executive vice president and chief operating officer – Chuck Schmidt; Treasurer – William Clay Ford Jr.; Director of player personnel – Ron Hughes; Director of pro scouting – Kevin Colbert; Head coaches: Head coach – Wayne Fontes; Assistant head coach – Dave Levy; Offensive coaches: Offensive coordinator – Dan Henning; Running backs – Billie Matthews; Receivers – Charlie Sanders; Offensive line – Jerry Wampfler; Offensive assistant – Dave Jaumotte	Defensive coaches: Defensive coordinator – Woody Widenhofer; Defensive line – Lamar Leachman; Inside linebackers – Herb Paterra; Outside linebackers – Don Clemons; Defensive backs – John Fontes; Special teams coaches: Special teams – Frank Gansz; Strength and conditioning: Strength and conditioning/defensive assistant – Bert Hill

=== Roster ===
1992 Detroit Lions roster
Quarterbacks (QB): 12 Erik Kramer; 9 Rodney Peete; 11 Andre Ware; Running backs (RB): 26 Eric Lynch; 20 Barry Sanders; 34 Ed Tillison; Wide receivers (WR): 40 Reggie Barrett; 87 Jeff Campbell PR; 81 Mike Farr; 86 Willie Green; 83 Aubrey Matthews; 84 Herman Moore; 80 Brett Perriman KR; Tight ends (TE): 48 Mike Hinnant; 89 Jimmie Johnson; 82 Thomas McLemore	Offensive linemen (OL): 66 Shawn Bouwens G; 75 Lomas Brown T; 76 Scott Conover T; 61 Brad Leggett C; 72 Jack Linn G; 63 Dennis McKnight C; 71 Larry Tharpe T; Defensive linemen (DL): 90 Dan Owens DE; 96 Lawrence Pete NT; 91 Robert Porcher DE; 94 Kelvin Pritchett DE; 92 Marc Spindler DE	Linebackers (LB): 52 John Derby ILB; 97 Darryl Ford OLB; 98 Dennis Gibson ILB; 58 George Jamison OLB; 95 Troy Johnson OLB; 51 Andre Jones OLB; 57 Victor Jones ILB; 59 Tracy Scroggins OLB; 54 Chris Spielman ILB; Defensive backs (DB): 36 Bennie Blades FS; 32 Willie Clay CB; 21 Harry Colon FS; 39 Ray Crockett CB; 24 Melvin Jenkins CB; 38 Kevin Scott CB; 25 Sheldon White CB; 35 William White SS; Special teams (ST): 6 Jim Arnold P; 4 Jason Hanson K	Practice squad: -- Leroy Smith LB; 70 Bernard Wilson NT; Reserve: 93 Jerry Ball NT (IR); 68 Leonard Burton C (IR); 50 Toby Caston LB (IR); 55 Mike Cofer LB (IR); 67 Ken Dallafior G (IR); 53 Kevin Glover C (IR); 23 Mel Gray RS (IR); 74 Willie Griffin DE (IR); 99 Tracy Hayworth LB (IR); 16 Chuck Long QB (IR); 62 Blake Miller C (IR); 27 Junior Robinson CB (IR); 64 Eric Sanders T (IR); Rookies in italics 47 active, 13 reserve, 2 practice squad

== Regular season ==
=== Schedule ===
Week	Date	Opponent	Result	Attendance
1	September 6	at Chicago Bears	L 27–24	63,672
2	September 13	Minnesota Vikings	W 31–17	57,519
3	September 20	at Washington Redskins	L 13–10	55,818
4	September 27	Tampa Bay Buccaneers	L 27–23	51,374
5	October 4	New Orleans Saints	L 13–7	66,971
6	Bye			
7	October 15	at Minnesota Vikings	L 31–14	52,816
8	October 25	at Tampa Bay Buccaneers	W 38–7	53,995
9	November 1	Green Bay Packers	L 27–13	60,594
10	November 8	Dallas Cowboys	L 37–3	74,816
11	November 15	at Pittsburgh Steelers	L 17–14	52,242
12	November 22	at Cincinnati Bengals	W 19–13	48,574
13	November 26	Houston Oilers	L 24–21	73,711
14	December 6	at Green Bay Packers	L 38–10	49,469
15	December 13	Cleveland Browns	W 24–14	65,970
16	December 20	Chicago Bears	W 16–3	72,777
17	December 28	at San Francisco 49ers	L 24–6	55,907

=== Game summaries ===
==== Week 16 ====
Team	1	2	3	4	Total
Bears	0	0	3	0	3
• Lions	3	10	0	3	16

- Date: December 20
- Location: Pontiac Silverdome, Pontiac, Michigan
- Game start: 4:00 p.m.
- Game weather: Indoors (dome)

Scoring summary
Q1	DET	Hanson 22 yard field goal	DET 3–0
Q2	DET	Sanders 6 yard run (Hanson kick)	DET 10–0
Q2	DET	Hanson 38 yard field goal	DET 13–0
Q3	CHI	Butler 24 yard field goal	DET 13–3
Q4	DET	Hanson 30 yard field goal	DET 16–3

- Barry Sanders 20 Rush, 113 Yds

=== Standings ===
NFC Central
	W	L	T	PCT	DIV	CONF	PF	PA	STK
^{(3)} Minnesota Vikings	11	5	0	.688	7–1	8–4	374	249	W2
Green Bay Packers	9	7	0	.563	4–4	6–6	276	296	L1
Tampa Bay Buccaneers	5	11	0	.313	3–5	5–9	267	365	W1
Chicago Bears	5	11	0	.313	3–5	4–8	295	361	L2
Detroit Lions	5	11	0	.313	3–5	3–9	273	332	L1
