= Stephen Boyd (American football) =

American football player and coach (born 1972)

No. 57
- Position: Linebacker

Personal information
- Born: August 22, 1972 (age 54); Valley Stream, New York, U.S.
- Listed height: 6 ft 0 in (1.83 m)
- Listed weight: 242 lb (110 kg)

Career information
- High school: Valley Stream Central
- College: Boston College
- NFL draft: 1995: 5th round, 141st overall pick

Career history
- Detroit Lions (1995–2001)

Awards and highlights
- Second-team All-Pro (2000); 2× Pro Bowl (1999, 2000); First-team All-American (1994)

Career NFL statistics
- Tackles: 575
- Sacks: 6.5
- Interceptions: 3
- Stats at Pro Football Reference

Stephen Gerard Boyd (born August 22, 1972) is an American former professional football player who was a linebacker for the Detroit Lions of the National Football League (NFL). He played college football for the Boston College Eagles, starting for four seasons, and was selected in the fifth round of the 1995 NFL draft with the 141st pick. Boyd was a two-time Pro Bowl selection at middle linebacker for the Lions.

== Early life ==
Boyd played his high school football for Valley Stream Central High School (Valley Stream, NY) for Coach Dan Tronolone, where he led the Eagles to the 1989 Nassau County Conference II Championship. A two-year captain, Boyd was selected as a Daily News All-Star his junior year after recording 102 tackles and three fumble recoveries. Boyd tabbed 92 tackles, three fumble recoveries, three interceptions and a blocked punt as a senior. He also contributed 576 yards on 104 carries with 14 touchdowns as a fullback and added 9 PATs. He was selected as the Daily News Metropolitan Player of the Year and selected to the All-Suburban football team. He was the winner of the Thorpe Award which goes to the best football player in Nassau County.

Boyd chose to play at Boston College after entertaining over two dozen offers including Wake Forest, Notre Dame, and Maryland. Boyd earned a starting role as a redshirt freshman in the 1991 season where he totaled 100 tackles. As a sophomore Boyd earned 2nd team All-Big East honors. During the 1993 campaign, Boyd led the Big East in tackles with 161 and was selected 1st team All-Big East. In 1994, he was elected the ECAC Player of the Year. As a senior at Boston College, he was invited to play in the 1994 East-West Shrine Game where he recorded an interception and the 1994 Hula Bowl.

== Professional career ==
Pre-draft measurables
Height	Weight	40-yard dash	10-yard split	20-yard split	Vertical jump	Broad jump	Bench press
6 ft 0 3/4 in (1.85 m)	240 lb (109 kg)	4.88 s	1.68 s	2.79 s	32 in (0.81 m)	9 ft 3 in (2.82 m)	26 reps
All values from NFL Combine

Boyd was selected in the fifth round with the 141st overall pick in the 1995 NFL draft by the Detroit Lions.

=== 1995 ===
As a rookie in the NFL, he backed up legendary All-Pro middle linebacker Chris Spielman.

=== 1997 ===
When Spielman left the Lions for the Buffalo Bills in 1996, Boyd became the starter and an integral part of the defense for the next six seasons. In 1997, Boyd paced the Lions with 192 tackles leading Detroit to the NFC Wild Card game for the second time in three seasons. He was named the NFC Defensive Player of the Week (8/31) in the season opener when he scored his first career touchdown on a 42-yard fumble recovery, and set up the game winning TD with his first career interception. He also led the team with 15 tackles that game.

=== 1998 ===
In 1998, Boyd led the Lions with 156 tackles, despite missing the last three games of the season with a shoulder injury. He was named the NFC Player of the Month for November when he compiled 56 tackles and two sacks in four games. He was named the first alternate at middle linebacker on the NFC's Pro Bowl squad, and would have played in the game if he had not been recovering from a shoulder injury.

=== 1999 ===
In 1999, Boyd led the team in tackles for the third straight season with 128. He was also named to the All-Madden team for the first time in his career. In a Wild Card loss to the Washington Redskins Boyd recorded 18 tackles and returned his first post-season interception for five yards. He was also named to his first Pro Bowl as a starter for the NFC as middle linebacker.

=== 2000 ===
In 2000, Boyd led the Lions for the fourth consecutive year with 139 tackles. He recorded 10 double-digit tackle outings in the 15 games that he played. He was named to his second consecutive Associated Press Pro Bowl, and was also named All-Pro Second Team and All-NFC for second straight season by Football News.

=== 2001 ===
Boyd retired in May 2002 after playing in only 4 games in the 2001 season due to chronic back pain.

=== NFL statistics ===
Year	Team	GP	COMB	TOTAL	AST	SACK	FF	FR	FR YDS	INT	IR YDS	AVG IR	LNG	TD	PD
1995	Detroit Lions	16	3	1	2	1.0	0	0	0	0	0	0	0	0	0
1996	Detroit Lions	8	36	20	16	0.0	1	0	0	0	0	0	0	0	2
1997	Detroit Lions	16	137	89	48	0.0	1	1	0	1	4	4	4	0	5
1998	Detroit Lions	13	110	73	37	4.0	2	3	0	0	0	0	0	0	6
1999	Detroit Lions	14	128	83	44	0.0	1	0	0	1	18	18	18	0	5
2000	Detroit Lions	15	139	75	63	0.5	2	1	0	1	0	0	0	0	8
2001	Detroit Lions	4	22	16	6	1.0	1	0	0	0	0	0	0	0	0
Career		86	573	357	216	6.5	8	5	0	3	22	7	18	0	26

== Post-playing career ==
He currently resides in Long Beach, New York and was the head coach of Chaminade High School football in Mineola, New York. He led the Flyers to a CHSFL state championship in 2012 with a 17-16 victory over rival St. Anthony’s. He retired from coaching in 2016. He continues to work at Chaminade part-time.
