= Bye Bye Barry =

2023 documentary film on Barry Sanders

- Film poster
- Directed by: Paul Monusky; Micaela Powers; Angela Torma
- Produced by: Jeff Cameron; Chris Weaver
- Cinematography: Chad Schwartzenberger
- Edited by: Jeff Cameron; Jason Weber
- Production company: NFL Films
- Release date: November 21, 2023
- Running time: 92 minutes
- Country: United States
- Language: English

Bye Bye Barry is a 2023 American documentary film directed by Paul Monusky, Micaela Powers, and Angela Torma. It follows Barry Sanders' decision to abruptly retire while on the very verge of breaking the NFL all-time rushing record. It was released on Amazon Prime on November 21, 2023.

The film is based on the book Bye Bye Barry, written by Barry Sanders and Mark McCormick.

== Cast ==
- Barry Sanders
- Tim Allen
- Jeff Daniels
- Eminem
- Bill Belichick
- Jemele Hill
- Emmit Smith

== Controversy ==
After the documentary was released, former Detroit Lions quarterback Scott Mitchell relayed to the press that too much blame for the Lions failure was placed on him.

== Reception ==
On the review aggregator website Rotten Tomatoes, 91% of 11 critics' reviews are positive, with an average rating of 6.9/10.
