= Ryan McNeil (American football) =

American football player (born 1970)

No. 47
- Position: Cornerback

Personal information
- Born: October 4, 1970 (age 56); Fort Pierce, Florida, U.S.
- Listed height: 6 ft 2 in (1.88 m)
- Listed weight: 210 lb (95 kg)

Career information
- High school: Fort Pierce Westwood
- College: Miami
- NFL draft: 1993: 2nd round, 33rd overall pick

Career history
- Detroit Lions (1993–1996); St. Louis Rams (1997–1998); Cleveland Browns (1999); Dallas Cowboys (2000); San Diego Chargers (2001–2002); Denver Broncos (2003)

Awards and highlights
- Pro Bowl (2001); NFL interceptions leader (1997); 2× National champion (1989, 1991); Consensus All-American (1992); 2× All-Big East (1991, 1992)

Career NFL statistics
- Tackles: 699
- Interceptions: 31
- Fumble recoveries: 14
- Stats at Pro Football Reference

Ryan Darrell McNeil (born October 4, 1970) is an American former professional football player who was a cornerback for 11 seasons in the National Football League (NFL). He played college football for the Miami Hurricanes, and earned All-American honors. He was selected by the Detroit Lions in the second round of the 1993 NFL draft, and also played professionally for the St. Louis Rams, Cleveland Browns, Dallas Cowboys, San Diego Chargers and Denver Broncos of the NFL.

== Early life ==
McNeil was born in Fort Pierce, Florida. He attended Westwood High School,. where he was a two-time offensive player of the year. As a senior free safety he registered 61 tackles (47 solo), six interceptions and 5 fumble recoveries. As a wide receiver he had 23 receptions for 323 yards and 4 touchdowns. In track, he won the district title in the long jump, triple jump and 440-yard dash.

== College career ==
McNeil accepted an athletic scholarship to attend the University of Miami. As a freshman, he was named the starter at cornerback after Kenny Berry was injured, finishing with 15 tackles (9 solo). The next year although he was platooned at the "field" cornerback position with Roland Smith and registered 34 tackles (19 solo), 6 passes defensed and one interception.

As a junior, he recorded 38 tackles (21 solo), 5 interceptions, 17 passes defensed, a forced fumble and a fumble recovery. In his last year he was recognized as a consensus first-team All-American at cornerback, after finishing with 34 tackles (23 solo), 10 passes defensed and 2 interceptions. He was a member of the Hurricanes' national championship teams in 1989 and 1991.

== Professional career ==
The Detroit Lions selected McNeil in the second round (33rd overall) of the 1993 NFL draft. The New York Jets originally held the second round pick, but agreed to trade it to the Detroit Lions in return for their second (36th overall) and fifth round (120th overall) picks in the 1993 NFL Draft.

He became the starter at left cornerback in his second season. In 1995, he recorded 86 tackles and 2 interceptions. The next year, he had 5 interceptions.

In 1997, he was declared a free agent and chose to sign the St. Louis Rams, after an offer from the Lions was pulled after the firing of head coach Wayne Fontes. At the end of the year, he led the NFL in interceptions with nine and also had 71 tackles. The next year his statistics dropped to one interception and 54 tackles.

With the Cleveland Browns in 1999, he registered 81 tackles and recovered four fumbles.

On March 2, 2000, he signed as a free agent with the Dallas Cowboys reuniting with his former University of Miami secondary coach Dave Campo. He replaced Deion Sanders at right cornerback, who was waived in a salary cap move. Although the team wanted to keep him, the salary cap situation forced them to waive McNeil on February 28, 2001.

On March 3, 2001, he was signed by the San Diego Chargers. In September, he was named the AFC Defensive Player of the Month. At the end of the season, he finished with 8 interceptions and was named to the Pro Bowl to replace an injured Sam Madison. In 2003, he was moved to free safety during training camp and was eventually released on August 12.

On November 11, 2003, he signed with the Denver Broncos to play as a nickel corner, but injuries limited him to 4 games.

== Personal life ==
After McNeil retired from professional football, he founded the Professional Business & Financial Network, an organization designed to provide professional athletes with the fundamental tools they need to succeed in business. He is also the publisher of OT Magazine , a lifestyle magazine dedicated to helping professional athletes manage their money. His numerous business interests are managed by David Cornwell and Don West, Jr. Ryan is active in the sports technology industry as the Founder & CEO of SportsID. He also advises and invests in football technology businesses, such as FanWide. His father played tight end in the Canadian Football League with the Ottawa Roughriders.
