= Cory Schlesinger =

American football player (born 1972)

No. 30
- Position: Fullback

Personal information
- Born: June 23, 1972 (age 54); Columbus, Nebraska, U.S.
- Listed height: 6 ft 1 in (1.85 m)
- Listed weight: 247 lb (112 kg)

Career information
- High school: Columbus
- College: Nebraska
- NFL draft: 1995: 6th round, 192nd overall pick

Career history
- Detroit Lions (1995–2006); Miami Dolphins (2007)*
- * Offseason or practice squad member only

Awards and highlights
- 3× Pro Bowl (2002–2004); Detroit Lions 75th Anniversary Team; Detroit Lions All-Time Team; National champion (1994)

Career NFL statistics
- Rushing yards: 473
- Rushing average: 2.8
- Rushing touchdowns: 5
- Receptions: 197
- Receiving yards: 1,445
- Receiving touchdowns: 9
- Stats at Pro Football Reference

Cory Michael Schlesinger (born June 23, 1972) is an American former professional football player who was a fullback for the Detroit Lions of the National Football League (NFL). He played college football for the Nebraska Cornhuskers. He was selected by the Lions in the sixth round of the 1995 NFL draft. He was selected to three Pro Bowls.

== Early life ==
Schlesinger was a two-time all-state selection at linebacker at Columbus High School, leading the team in tackles as a junior and senior. He also played fullback as a senior in 1990. For the season, he rushed for 1,514 yards and 23 touchdowns (including nine 100-yard games). He was named the Nebraska Defensive Player of the Year as a prep senior and played with a group of Nebraska football all-stars in the Down Under Bowl in Sydney, Australia following his senior season.

He also won the 189-pound wrestling state championship twice during his prep career.

== College career ==
Schlesinger was a two-year starter for the Nebraska Cornhuskers. As a junior, he was the 1993 Husker Co-Lifter-of-the-Year with linebacker Donta Jones. During that season he finished as the team's fifth-leading rusher with 48 carries for 193 yards and one touchdown.

He earned All-Big Eight honorable mention honors in 1994 in a coaches poll and a Phillips 66 Academic All-Big Eight pick the same year. Schlesinger scored two fourth-quarter touchdowns in the 1995 Orange Bowl in a 24–17 win over the Miami Hurricanes as a senior to secure Nebraska's first national title under then-head coach Tom Osborne.

He would finish second on the team in rushing in 1994 with 456 yards and four touchdowns including 7.2 yards-per-carry.

== Professional career ==
=== Detroit Lions ===
Schlesinger was drafted by the Detroit Lions in the sixth round (192nd overall) of the 1995 NFL draft. He started two of the team's first three games during his rookie season at fullback blocking for Barry Sanders, but playing time in the backfield diminished soon thereafter when the offense began employing three-receiver sets on almost every play from scrimmage. He finished second on the team with 15 special teams tackles. In 1996, he was primarily used on special teams, leading the club with 13 tackles on the year. In 1997, he split time at fullback with Tommy Vardell and saw more action there than in previous years with the Lions with the team moving to a predominantly two-back set. He again played on special teams, finishing second on team with 27 tackles. He was the backup to Vardell at most times during the 1998 season but did see playing time in the backfield. He served as one of squad's most productive special teams players for a fourth consecutive season, with his 18 tackles ranking fifth on the Lions. On offense, he was part of team's "jumbo" package at goal-line and in short-yardage with he and Vardell sharing the backfield. In 1999, he became the Lions' full-time starting fullback, replacing Vardell. He also finished third on the team with 15 special teams tackles. Schlesinger was named as a member of the 1999 All-Madden team and filmed a sketch for the show in a Lincoln, Nebraska grocery store where he repeatedly crashed into other shoppers with his cart.

In 2000, Schlesinger played in all 16 games for the fifth time in six NFL seasons and second year as the Lions' starting fullback. His 15 special teams tackles tied for fifth on squad as well. In 2001, the Lions named Marty Mornhinweg head coach and the team moved away from a power rushing attack to the west coast offense. The fullback, in addition to rushing and blocking responsibilities, can also be more involved in the passing game. Schlesinger finished the 2001 season with single-season career highs in rushing attempts (47), rushing yards (154), rushing touchdowns (three), receptions (60), and receiving yards (466). On the year Schlesinger rushed for 16 first downs, the only season of his career he accumulated a double-digit total in the category. For his efforts during the season, he was voted the Chuck Hughes Most Improved Player by teammates and was also voted onto Howie Long's Tough Guy team. He was also named to the 2001 All-Pro Team by Sports Illustrated's Paul Zimmerman and to the college and Pro Football Newsweekly 2001 All-Pro Second-team squad. In 2002, he finished the year with 139 rushing yards and two rushing touchdowns along with 35 receptions for 263 yards. He was an alternate in the 2002 Pro Bowl to starter Mike Alstott. He was also the Detroit Lions recipient of the 2002 Ed Block Courage Award.

In 2003, Schlesinger was voted by his teammates as the Bobby Layne Offensive Most Valuable Player (MVP) Award winner and as the Mike Utley Spirit Award winner. He was an alternate in the 2003 Pro Bowl to starter Alstott. In 2004, he was named as an alternate to the 2005 Pro Bowl for the third-straight season. He finished the season with a career-high three receiving touchdowns. He was a 2004 Pro Bowl alternate to starter Fred Beasley. Schlesinger missed the first portion of the 2005 season after suffering a fractured left fibula in preseason opener at New York Jets on August 12. Schlesinger was the 2005 recipient of the Detroit Lions/Detroit Sports Broadcasters Association/Pro Football Writers Association's Media-Friendly "Good Guy" Award. In 2006, he appeared in 14 games with four starts to record eight catches for 36 yards (4.5 avg). He was inactive with a hamstring injury at the New York Jets on October 22 and against the Atlanta Falcons on November 5. He returned to the lineup against the San Francisco 49ers on November 12 to play in his 174th career game, which moved him into a tie for seventh with placekicker Eddie Murray (1980–1991) on the team's all-time games played list.

In 2007, Schlesinger signed with the Miami Dolphins on March 11, 2007, in anticipation he would become the lead blocker for running back Ronnie Brown. However, he was released at the end of training camp, losing out to rookie sixth-round draft pick Reagan Mauia.

=== Career statistics ===
Season				Rushing					Receiving					Fumbles		
Year	Team	GP	GS	Att	Yds	Avg	TD	Lng	Rec	Yds	Avg	Lng	TD	Fum	Lost	
1995	DET	16	GS	2	1	1	1.0	0	1	1	2	2.0	2	0	0	0
1996	DET	16	1	0	0	0	0	0	0	0	0	0	0	0	0	
1997	DET	16	2	7	11	1.6	0	4	5	69	13.8	33	1	0	0	
1998	DET	15	2	5	17	3.4	0	5	3	16	5.3	8	1	0	0	
1999	DET	16	11	43	124	2.9	0	16	21	151	7.2	25	1	4	0	
2000	DET	16	8	1	3	3.0	0	3	12	73	6.1	13	0	0	0	
2001	DET	16	13	47	154	3.3	3	26	60	466	7.8	38	0	1	0	
2002	DET	16	14	49	139	2.8	2	17	35	263	7.5	43	0	2	0	
2003	DET	16	10	9	16	1.8	0	4	34	247	7.3	33	2	0	0	
2004	DET	13	11	4	7	1.8	0	2	10	91	9.1	30	3	0	0	
2005	DET	11	8	1	1	1.0	0	1	8	31	3.9	8	1	0	0	
2006	DET	14	5	0	0	0	0	0	8	36	4.5	6	0	0	0	
Career		181	87	167	473	2.8	5	26	197	1,445	7.3	43	9	7	0	

=== Career after football ===
Schlesinger is a teacher at Allen Park High School in Allen Park, Michigan.

== Personal life ==
While in high school, Schlesinger drove in demolition derbies for three years. He completed a degree in industrial technology education at the University of Nebraska–Lincoln and spent parts of the 1995–1997 off-seasons as a student teacher at Park Middle School in Lincoln, Nebraska and taught at his alma mater during the 1998–1999 off-seasons. Since 2008, he has been a computer-aided design and drafting teacher at Allen Park High School in Allen Park, Michigan.

He and his wife have two daughters.
