= Aubrey Matthews =

American football player (born 1962)

No. 83, 88
- Position: Wide receiver

Personal information
- Born: September 15, 1962 (age 64); Pascagoula, Mississippi, U.S.
- Listed height: 5 ft 7 in (1.70 m)
- Listed weight: 165 lb (75 kg)

Career information
- High school: Moss Point (MS)
- College: Delta State
- NFL draft: 1984: undrafted

Career history
- Jacksonville Bulls (1984–1985); Atlanta Falcons (1986–1988); Green Bay Packers (1988–1989); Detroit Lions (1990–1996)

Career NFL statistics
- Receptions: 160
- Receiving yards: 2,112
- Touchdowns: 9
- Stats at Pro Football Reference

Aubrey Derrod Matthews (born September 15, 1962) is an American former professional football player who played as a wide receiver in the National Football League (NFL). He played college football for the Delta State Statesmen.

== Career ==
Matthews, a wide receiver from Delta State University and a junior college transfer from Mississippi Gulf Coast Junior College, went undrafted but played 11 NFL seasons with the Atlanta Falcons, Green Bay Packers and Detroit Lions. He began his professional football career with the Jacksonville Bulls of the USFL. In 2004, he was inducted into the Delta State University Athletics Hall of Fame and in 2023, into the Mississippi Gulf Coast Community College Hall of Fame.

== NFL career statistics ==
Legend
**Bold**	Career high

=== Regular season ===
Year	Team	Games		Receiving				
Year	Team	GP	GS	Rec	Yds	Avg	Lng	TD
1986	ATL	4	0	1	25	**25.0**	25	0
1987	ATL	12	**6**	**32**	**537**	16.8	**57**	**3**
1988	ATL	4	0	5	64	12.8	21	0
1988	GNB	7	2	15	167	11.1	25	2
1989	GNB	13	3	18	200	11.1	25	0
1990	DET	13	**6**	30	349	11.6	52	1
1991	DET	1	1	3	21	7.0	11	0
1992	DET	13	0	9	137	15.2	24	0
1993	DET	14	2	11	171	15.5	40	0
1994	DET	14	3	29	359	12.4	33	**3**
1995	DET	11	0	4	41	10.3	12	0
1996	DET	**16**	0	3	41	13.7	21	0
		122	23	160	2,112	13.2	57	9

=== Playoffs ===
Year	Team	Games		Receiving				
Year	Team	GP	GS	Rec	Yds	Avg	Lng	TD
1991	DET	**2**	**1**	0	0	0.0	0	0
1993	DET	1	0	0	0	0.0	0	0
1994	DET	1	0	3	36	**12.0**	22	0
1995	DET	1	0	**7**	**73**	10.4	**23**	0
		5	1	10	109	10.9	23	0
