= Brad Ford =

American football player (born 1974)

No. 44
- Position: Cornerback

Personal information
- Born: January 11, 1974 (age 52); Alexander City, Alabama, U.S.
- Listed height: 5 ft 10 in (1.78 m)
- Listed weight: 170 lb (77 kg)

Career information
- High school: Dadeville (Dadeville, Alabama)
- College: Alabama
- NFL draft: 1996: 4th round, 129th overall pick

Career history
- Detroit Lions (1996-1997)

Career NFL statistics
- Total tackles: 5
- Stats at Pro Football Reference

Brad Jamar Ford (born January 11, 1974) is an American former professional football player who was a cornerback for the Detroit Lions in the National Football League (NFL). He played college football for the Alabama Crimson Tide and was selected by the Lions in the fourth round of the 1996 NFL draft.

== College career ==
Ford initially attended Fresno City College in 1992 and 1993, before transferring to the University of Alabama. At Alabama, he appeared in 23 games and recorded two interceptions, one returned for a touchdown.

== Professional career ==
Ford was selected in the fourth round (129th overall) of the 1996 NFL draft by the Detroit Lions. While with the Lions, he appeared in 14 games as a rookie, recording five tackles.
