= Ron Rice (American football) =

American football player (born 1972)

No. 28
- Position: Safety

Personal information
- Born: November 9, 1972 (age 53); Detroit, Michigan, U.S.
- Listed height: 6 ft 1 in (1.85 m)
- Listed weight: 216 lb (98 kg)

Career information
- High school: University of Detroit Jesuit
- College: Eastern Michigan
- NFL draft: 1995: undrafted

Career history
- Detroit Lions (1995–2001)

Career NFL statistics
- Tackles: 400
- Interceptions: 12
- Sacks: 6.5
- Stats at Pro Football Reference

Ron Rice (born November 9, 1972) is an American former professional football player who was a safety for the Detroit Lions of the National Football League (NFL). He played college football for the Eastern Michigan Eagles and was signed by the Lions as an undrafted free agent in 1995.

Rice graduated from Eastern Michigan University with a BA in criminal justice.

== NFL career statistics ==
Legend
**Bold**	Career high

=== Regular season ===
Year	Team	Games		Tackles				Interceptions				Fumbles			
Year	Team	GP	GS	Comb	Solo	Ast	Sck	Int	Yds	TD	Lng	FF	FR	Yds	TD
1996	DET	13	2	39	26	13	0.0	0	0	0	0	0	0	0	0
1997	DET	12	8	49	38	11	1.0	1	18	0	18	0	0	0	0
1998	DET	16	16	92	57	**35**	**3.5**	3	25	0	25	**1**	0	0	0
1999	DET	16	16	**109**	**82**	27	1.0	**5**	**82**	0	**33**	**1**	**1**	0	0
2000	DET	14	14	71	42	29	0.0	1	7	0	7	0	**1**	**6**	0
2001	DET	8	8	40	24	16	1.0	2	9	0	8	0	0	0	0
		79	64	400	269	131	6.5	12	141	0	33	2	2	6	0

=== Playoffs ===
Year	Team	Games		Tackles				Interceptions				Fumbles			
Year	Team	GP	GS	Comb	Solo	Ast	Sck	Int	Yds	TD	Lng	FF	FR	Yds	TD
1997	DET	1	1	**5**	2	**3**	0.0	**1**	**2**	0	**2**	0	0	0	0
1999	DET	1	1	**5**	**3**	2	0.0	0	0	0	0	0	0	0	0
		2	2	10	5	5	0.0	1	2	0	2	0	0	0	0

== Criminal charges ==
The New York Times Reported: Three N.F.L. players and a former N.F.L. player were accused in a lawsuit yesterday of drugging and raping a woman at a Las Vegas apartment and hotel room in May 2000. Detroit Lions safety Ron Rice and quarterback Charlie Batch, the former Lions defensive back Tyree Talton and Miami Dolphins wide receiver Dedric Ward are named in the lawsuit, which was filed in Clark County District Court." ,

Sports Illustrated reported "The woman's attorney, John Lukens, said his client believes the players slipped a "date rape" drug into her drink. She only has a partial memory of the next four to six hours after she had the drink. The woman, then 33, recalls being taken to an apartment, where she claims Batch, Ward and Talton repeatedly raped her, according to the suit. The woman also remembers returning to Mandalay Bay, where she says Ward dropped off her, Batch and Talton on his way to the airport. She accuses Batch, Talton and Rice of raping her again in a hotel room. The lawsuit says she remembers begging Talton to stop hurting her. The woman and the three players left the hotel at some point and the woman met some friends in the casino, then went to her own room to sleep. She returned home to Washington on May 7. Her attorney said she went to a Seattle hospital the next day and reported the rape to authorities."

== Retirement ==
Since his football career, Ron Rice is currently a defensive coach for the Farmington Hills (MI) Harrison football team and Michigan Elite Football Club 7 on 7 team.
