= Robert Porcher =

American football player (born 1969)

No. 91
- Position: Defensive end

Personal information
- Born: July 30, 1969 (age 57); Wando, South Carolina, U.S.
- Listed height: 6 ft 3 in (1.91 m)
- Listed weight: 266 lb (121 kg)

Career information
- High school: Cainhoy (Huger, South Carolina)
- College: South Carolina State (1988–1991)
- NFL draft: 1992: 1st round, 26th overall pick

Career history
- Detroit Lions (1992–2004)

Awards and highlights
- 3× Pro Bowl (1997, 1999, 2001); Pride of the Lions; Detroit Lions 75th Anniversary Team; Detroit Lions All-Time Team

Career NFL statistics
- Tackles: 602
- Sacks: 95.5
- Forced fumbles: 18
- Fumble recoveries: 7
- Pass deflections: 19
- Interceptions: 1
- Defensive touchdowns: 1
- Stats at Pro Football Reference

Robert Porcher III (/pɔːrˈʃeɪ/ por-SHAY; born July 30, 1969) is an American former professional football player who was a defensive end for the Detroit Lions of the National Football League (NFL). He played college football for the South Carolina State Bulldogs under head coach Willie Jeffries. He was selected by the Lions in the first round of the 1992 NFL draft. He was a three-time Pro Bowl selection.

== Professional career ==
Pre-draft measurables
Height	Weight	Arm length	Hand span	40-yard dash	10-yard split	20-yard split	20-yard shuttle	Vertical jump	Broad jump	Bench press
6 ft 3 7/8 in (1.93 m)	283 lb (128 kg)	34 1/2 in (0.88 m)	10 in (0.25 m)	5.27 s	1.85 s	3.03 s	4.70 s	31.0 in (0.79 m)	9 ft 0 in (2.74 m)	22 reps

During much of his 13-year playing career, he was one of the league's most productive and feared defensive ends. Porcher played in 187 games—third all-time in Detroit history—and set a team record with 95.5 sacks during his career. He led Detroit in sacks eight times (also a Detroit record). He also became the first Lion to record double-digit sack totals in four consecutive seasons (1996–1999).

Porcher earned trips to the Pro Bowl in 1998, 2000 and 2001. He also finished his career with 24 career games notching more than one sack. From 1996 to 2001, Porcher garnered 68 sacks during that six-year period, which was the second-highest in the NFL during that span. His 673 career tackles are ranked seventh in Detroit Lions history.

== After football ==
Off the field, Porcher became actively involved in the community. His foundation for cancer research and relief fund raised thousands of dollars for programs at the University of Michigan Comprehensive Cancer Center. The Lions annual Man of the Year award is named the "Robert Porcher Man of the Year" in honor of his tremendous contributions to the community, especially in Detroit.

Porcher is now an entrepreneur, with various business interests, most notably in the transportation industry. He opened 3 businesses in Downtown Detroit: Detroit Breakfast House & Grill, Sweet Georgia Brown, and Seldom Blues. The Businesses filed for Chapter 11 bankruptcy in 2009.

== NFL career statistics ==
Legend
	Led the league
**Bold**	Career high

Year	Team	Games		Tackles					Fumbles			Interceptions			
Year	Team	GP	GS	Cmb	Solo	Ast	TFL	Scks	FF	FR	TD	Int	Yds	TD	PD
1992	DET	**16**	1	21	—	—	—	1.0	—	0	0	0	0	0	—
1993	DET	**16**	4	47	—	—	—	8.5	0	0	0	0	0	0	—
1994	DET	15	15	69	**47**	22	—	3.0	2	1	0	0	0	0	—
1995	DET	**16**	**16**	51	29	22	—	5.0	1	0	0	0	0	0	—
1996	DET	**16**	**16**	66	45	21	—	10.0	**3**	2	0	0	0	0	—
1997	DET	**16**	15	**72**	40	**32**	—	12.5	2	0	0	**1**	**5**	0	—
1998	DET	**16**	**16**	62	41	21	—	11.5	1	0	0	0	0	0	—
1999	DET	15	14	47	35	12	**17**	**15.0**	**3**	0	0	0	0	0	5
2000	DET	**16**	**16**	36	30	6	10	8.0	2	1	0	0	0	0	3
2001	DET	**16**	**16**	52	45	7	**17**	11.0	2	0	0	0	0	0	3
2002	DET	15	15	45	30	15	5	5.5	0	**3**	**1**	0	0	0	**8**
2003	DET	14	14	34	25	9	7	4.5	2	0	0	0	0	0	0
Career		187	158	602	367	167	56	95.5	18	7	1	1	5	0	19
