= Scott Mitchell (quarterback) =

American football player (born 1968)

No. 19
- Position: Quarterback

Personal information
- Born: January 2, 1968 (age 58); Salt Lake City, Utah, U.S.
- Listed height: 6 ft 6 in (1.98 m)
- Listed weight: 240 lb (109 kg)

Career information
- High school: Springville (Springville, Utah)
- College: Utah (1986–1989)
- NFL draft: 1990: 4th round, 93rd overall pick

Career history
- Miami Dolphins (1990–1993); → Orlando Thunder (1992); Detroit Lions (1994–1998); Baltimore Ravens (1999); Cincinnati Bengals (2000–2001)

Awards and highlights
- NCAA passing yards leader (1988); 2× Second-team All-WAC (1988, 1989)

Career NFL statistics
- Passing attempts: 2,346
- Passing completions: 1,301
- Completion percentage: 55.5%
- Passing yards: 15,692
- TD–INT: 95–81
- Passer rating: 75.3
- Stats at Pro Football Reference

William Scott Mitchell (born January 2, 1968) is an American former professional football player who was a quarterback for 12 seasons in the National Football League (NFL). He played college football for the Utah Utes and was selected in the fourth round of the 1990 NFL draft by the Miami Dolphins. Mitchell played in the NFL for the Dolphins, Detroit Lions, Baltimore Ravens, and Cincinnati Bengals, as well as the Orlando Thunder of the World League of American Football.

== Early life ==
William Scott Mitchell was born on January 2, 1968, in Salt Lake City, Utah. He attended Springville High School in Springville, Utah.

== College career ==
Mitchell played for the Utah Utes. As a sophomore in 1988, he completed 323 of 533 attempts for 4,322 yards and 29 touchdowns - leading the nation in all four categories (the 29 touchdown passes was tied with Miami's Steve Walsh). He ended the season with 10 NCAA records, most notably setting a single-game record with 631 yards passing in a 56-49 loss to Air Force.

His statistics declined somewhat the following year (1989), although he still managed to throw for 3,211 yards and 31 touchdowns. The 31 touchdown passes ranked third among players nationally, behind Heisman Trophy winner Andre Ware at Houston and Ty Detmer at rival BYU. Mitchell decided to forgo his senior season and entered the 1990 NFL draft. He ended his college career as Utah's all-time leader in passing yards (8,981) and passing touchdowns (69).

== Professional career ==
Mitchell was selected by the Miami Dolphins in the fourth round (93rd overall) of the 1990 NFL draft. He served as Dan Marino's back-up for three seasons but found most of his time spent with the Orlando Thunder of the NFL Europe in 1992 as a volunteer. That year, he joined a lawsuit with twelve other players (most notably involving Freeman McNeil and Marcus Allen) in an antitrust suit against the NFL that saw unrestricted free agency soon come to the league. Mitchell became the Dolphins' starting quarterback in 1993 when Marino ruptured his Achilles tendon in week 6 at Cleveland that saw him miss the rest of the season. Tapped to start, Mitchell dislocated his left shoulder in Week 11 that knocked him out for four games. He returned to start the final three games of the season, which all resulted in losses as the once 9-2 Dolphins floundered to a 9-7 finish. In total, Mitchell had gone 3-4 as a starter with 1,773 passing yards and 12 touchdowns to 8 interceptions and a passer rating of 84.2.

Based on his performances that year, Mitchell was signed as a free agent by the Detroit Lions on March 6, 1994 on a three-year contract worth $11 million (having rejected a deal by Miami to pay him $1.5 million-per-year deal as a backup), complete with a $5 million signing bonus, the second largest bonus in league history. Mitchell joined a Detroit offense that included running back Barry Sanders and receivers Herman Moore and Brett Perriman. He was tapped to start from the first week of the season, but the team struggled. In his first home game at the Pontiac Silverdome, he received boos that would occur in every subsequent game in his tenure; he threw eleven interceptions in his first eight starts. In a loss to the Green Bay Packers, Mitchell went down with an injury, and was replaced by backup quarterback Dave Krieg, who led the team to the 1994 playoffs. Offensive tackle Lomas Brown, on ESPN program First Take later admitted to purposefully missing a block that resulted in this injury, as he was upset over Mitchell's poor play. However, a review of game film and play-by-play logs of the game by football historian Andy Barall fails to corroborate Brown's recollection of what occurred, as Sanders apparently had failed to pick up a safety that was blitzing on Mitchell. Mitchell regained his starting position the following year.

In 1995, he set single-season records for the Lions in touchdown passes (32) and passing yards (4,338), both of which were later eclipsed by Matthew Stafford. The team reached the NFL playoffs that year, going 13-of-29 for 155 yards with a touchdown and four interceptions in a 58–37 loss where Don Majkowski replaced Mitchell when the team was trailing 51–7 in the third quarter. The following year, the Lions were 4-3 prior to Mitchell suffering an injury in practice where he pulled a muscle off his ribs that saw him take a hospital visit to put a needle in his ribs to try and deaden the pain. While the needles eventually helped the pain, he could not throw effectively, with the team losing six straight starts with Mitchell's injury-plagued play. The team went 5-11 and Fontes was fired. Bobby Ross was hired to be the new head coach, who favored a power-running style rather than the "spread offense" of the past. He soon sparred with Mitchell, where he reportedly barred him from meeting the new offensive coordinator Sylvester Croom or allowing him to speak to the Ford family, who had decided to keep Mitchell around as quarterback with a four-year extension worth $21 million with a signing bonus of $8 million (as not overseen by Ross). Apparently, Sanders held out for a time until his average per year exceeded Mitchell's rate; Mitchell once stated that “It was challenging to play with him", stating that the team as a whole excelled best under Tom Moore, who had been the offensive coordinator from 1994 to 1996.

The team reached the playoffs again in 1997. Facing the Tampa Bay Buccaneers, he went 10-of-25 for 78 yards and an interception before being knocked out with a concussion in the third quarter (where Frank Reich replaced him) in a 20-10 loss. Mitchell stayed with the Lions through the 1998 season, when he lost the starting quarterback job to rookie Charlie Batch. Made expendable after the Lions signed Gus Frerotte two weeks earlier, Mitchell was dealt to the Baltimore Ravens on March 16, 1999, for a third-round draft pick that year and a fifth-rounder in 2000.

Years later, Mitchell stated that he was "a very good player" in his time in Detroit while believing that his achievements there were minimized, whether out of jealousy or unreasonable expectations, stating that "I always felt I have been unjustly criticized." Brown described the team's failures as not so much about Mitchell as it "was failing to put the right coaching, schemes and systems around him." Mitchell reiterated his defense of his tenure in Detroit in the wake of the 2023 documentary Bye Bye Barry. While the documentary did not mention Mitchell by name, he took the documentary (which featured interviews of people such as Fontes) as implicitly blaming him for the reason that the Lions never won (or even make) a Super Bowl, stating that all were to blame to not make the Super Bowl, not just him, stating "I will believe until I die that had we been given more time and patience with the offense, we had and the talent we had we could have made a deep run in the playoffs and competed to win a Super Bowl."

After not being able to acquire Brad Johnson from the Minnesota Vikings, the Ravens settled for Mitchell who signed a one-year $3 million contract upon his arrival in Baltimore. He completed 24 of 56 passes for 236 yards, threw a touchdown pass and was intercepted four times before Stoney Case replaced him as starting quarterback during the third quarter of a 23–20 loss to the Pittsburgh Steelers in a Week 2 home opener at PSINet Stadium on September 19. He saw no further action with the Ravens and became an unrestricted free agent following the 1999 season.

Mitchell signed with the Cincinnati Bengals on March 9, 2000. He was the veteran backup to Akili Smith after Jeff Blake signed as a free agent with the New Orleans Saints. He retired as an active player following the 2001 season.

== Career statistics ==
=== NFL ===
Year	Team	Games			Passing							
Year	Team	GP	GS	Record	Cmp	Att	Pct	Yds	Y/A	TD	Int	Rtg
1992	MIA	16	0	–	2	8	25.0	32	4.0	0	1	4.2
1993	MIA	13	7	3–4	133	233	57.1	1,773	7.6	12	8	84.2
1994	DET	9	9	4–5	119	246	48.4	1,456	5.9	10	11	62.0
1995	DET	16	16	10–6	346	583	59.3	4,338	7.4	32	12	92.3
1996	DET	14	14	4–10	253	437	57.9	2,917	6.7	17	17	74.9
1997	DET	16	16	9–7	293	509	57.6	3,484	6.9	19	14	79.6
1998	DET	2	2	0–2	38	75	50.7	452	6.0	1	3	57.2
1999	BAL	2	2	0–2	24	56	42.9	236	4.2	1	4	31.5
2000	CIN	8	5	2–3	89	187	47.6	966	5.2	3	8	50.8
2001	CIN	1	0	–	4	12	33.3	38	3.2	0	3	3.5
Career		97	71	32–39	1,301	2,346	55.5	15,692	6.70	95	81	73.5

=== College ===
Season	Team	Passing								Rushing			
Season	Team	Cmp	Att	Pct	Yds	Y/A	TD	Int	Rtg	Att	Yds	Avg	TD
1987	Utah	109	188	58.0	1,448	7.7	9	4	134.2	21	-44	-2.1	1
1988	Utah	323	533	60.6	4,322	8.1	29	15	141.0	56	-23	-0.4	0
1989	Utah	237	444	53.4	3,211	7.2	31	19	128.6	64	-78	-1.2	2
Career		669	1,165	57.4	8,981	7.7	69	38	135.2	141	-145	-1.0	3

== Coaching career ==
In February 2008, Mitchell was announced as the head football coach of his alma mater, Springville High School in Utah. He stepped down from his coaching position in January 2012 to spend more time on his software business.

== Personal life ==
Mitchell has five children. As of 2025, he currently serves as the color commentator for Utah football on ESPN 700.

In his book Alive Again: The Biggest Loser Contestant and Former NFL Quarterback Shares His Intriguing Journey, Mitchell admitted his struggles with weight, in which he gained twenty pounds during the offseason that he would drop prior to the regular season (never being fined for failing to make his prescribed playing weight of 235 pounds). In 2014, Mitchell had reached 366 pounds (166 kg). He was a contestant on Season 16 of the reality competition The Biggest Loser, titled The Biggest Loser: Glory Days, which premiered on September 11, 2014, on NBC. Tiring of the cardio and healthy meal preparation in the middle of the show, he had planned to quit, feeling himself to be a failure. While taking a hike in the Santa Monica mountains and resting on a dirt trail, he heard a voice that told him, “If you quit now, you’ll regret this for the rest of your life.” The next morning, he was motivated to stay on the show. Mitchell was eliminated in week 15 as the last player eliminated from "comeback canyon", losing his final weigh-in to Howard "Woody" Carter, having lost 124 pounds. He wrote a book about his life and weight-loss experiences in 2015. Mitchell has since tried to manage his weight and health, which saw him weigh 418 pounds in 2023; in January 2024, his kidneys shut down and he developed blood clots in his lungs but he eventually made a recovery.

Mitchell is an Eagle Scout.

== See also ==
- List of NCAA major college football yearly passing leaders
- List of NCAA major college football yearly total offense leaders
- List of left-handed quarterbacks
