= Jason Hanson =

American football player (born 1970)

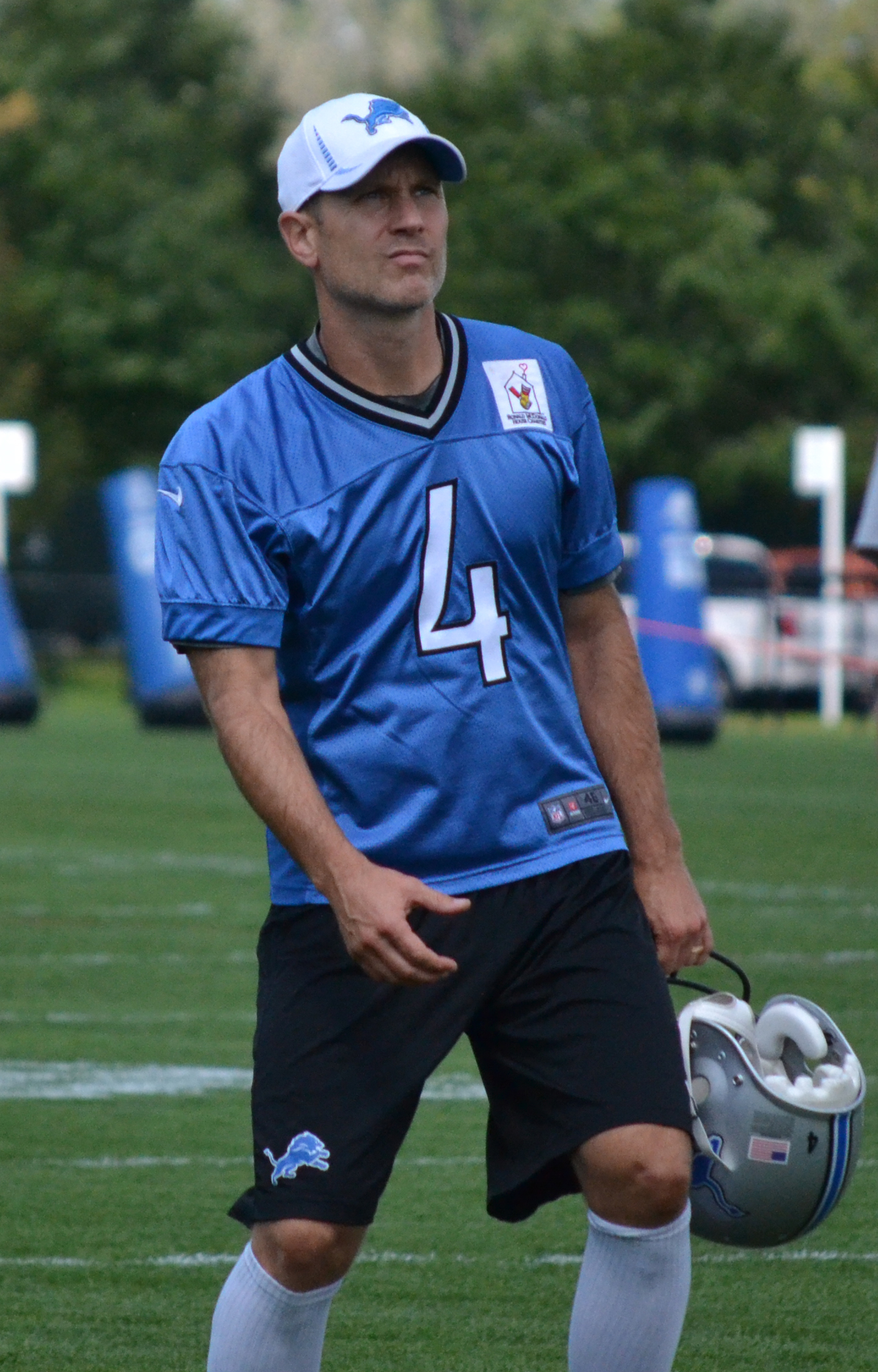
- Hanson with the Detroit Lions in 2012

No. 4
- Position: Placekicker

Personal information
- Born: June 17, 1970 (age 56); Spokane, Washington, U.S.
- Listed height: 6 ft 0 in (1.83 m)
- Listed weight: 190 lb (86 kg)

Career information
- High school: Mead (Spokane)
- College: Washington State (1988–1991)
- NFL draft: 1992: 2nd round, 56th overall pick

Career history
- Detroit Lions (1992–2012)

Awards and highlights
- Second-team All-Pro (1997); 2× Pro Bowl (1997, 1999); PFWA All-Rookie Team (1992); Pride of the Lions; Detroit Lions 75th Anniversary Team; Detroit Lions All-Time Team; Unanimous All-American (1989); First-team All-American (1991); Third-team All-American (1990); 3× First-team All-Pac-10 (1989, 1990, 1991); NFL records: Most seasons played with one team: 21 (Detroit Lions); Most games played with one team: 327 (Detroit Lions)

Career NFL statistics
- Field goals made: 495
- Field goals attempted: 601
- Field goal %: 82.4
- Longest field goal: 56
- Points scored: 2,150
- Stats at Pro Football Reference
- College Football Hall of Fame

Jason Douglas Hanson (born June 17, 1970) is an American former professional football player who was a placekicker with the Detroit Lions of the National Football League (NFL) for 21 seasons. After playing college football with the Washington State Cougars, he was selected by the Lions in the second round of the 1992 NFL draft with the 56th overall pick. Hanson holds the NFL record for the most seasons played with one team and also holds multiple kicking and scoring records. Due to his longevity and statistical success, even on many non-playoff teams, Hanson is often cited as one of the most-loved players in Detroit Lions franchise history.

== Early life ==
Born in Spokane, Washington, Hanson graduated from Mead High School in 1988, where he lettered in football, basketball, and soccer. As a senior, Hanson won All-Greater Spokane League honors as both a kicker and punter and was named a first-team All-State honoree by the Washington Sportswriters Association. In the classroom at Mead, he maintained a perfect 4.0 grade point average.

== College career ==
Hanson attended Washington State University in Pullman, where he walked-on as a freshman in 1988 and made an immediate impact with the Cougars; he was named to The Sporting News Freshman All-American team. Hanson set or tied many NCAA records, and his percentage of 57.1 for field goals from 50 yards or greater remains a Pac-12 Conference record. He holds the record for most field goals from 50 yards or more (20), and 40 yards or more (39). Hanson's school records include most points scored (328), longest field goal (62 yards), most games with two or more field goals (20), field goals (63), and PATs (139). He was also the punter at WSU during his final two seasons, and was a teammate of quarterback Drew Bledsoe, who arrived in 1990. Hanson earned a Bachelor of Science degree from WSU in pre-med studies, with 3.78 grade point average. Hanson was inducted into the College Football Hall of Fame in 2020.

== Professional career ==
Pre-draft measurables
Height	Weight
5 ft 11 3/4 in (1.82 m)	183 lb (83 kg)
All values from NFL Combine

Hanson was selected in the second round of the 1992 NFL draft by the Lions, the 56th overall pick. On October 21, 2001, Hanson had a 47 yard field goal blocked against the Tennessee Titans which was returned for 69 yard touchdown by Donald Mitchell.

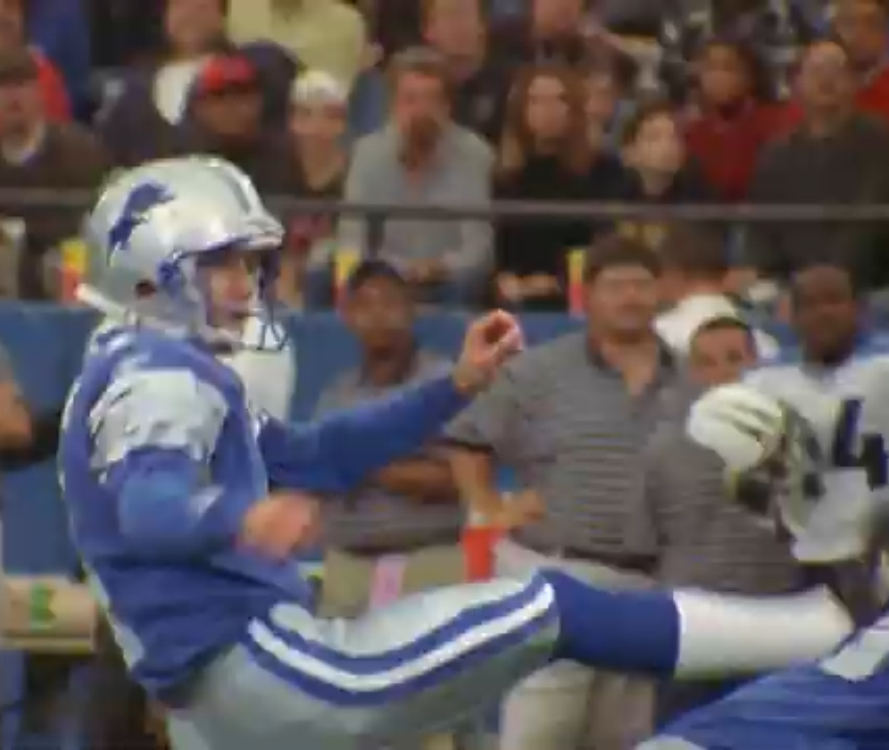
Hanson in 2001

Hanson retired from the Lions in 2013; no NFL player played as many games (327) with the same team as Hanson, breaking the old record of 296 held by Bruce Matthews in Week 2 of the 2011 season vs. the Kansas City Chiefs. At the beginning of the 2012 season, he set the record for most years with the same club with 21 seasons.

On December 14, 2008, Hanson broke Morten Andersen’s NFL record for career field goals of 50 yards or longer during a game against the Indianapolis Colts. Hanson then finished the 2008 season with 21 field goals in 22 attempts, including all eight from 50 yards or longer. His 95.5% field goal percentage was the second best of his career. He also made 25 of 26 extra-point attempts.

By the end of the 2010 season, Hanson had missed only eight extra points in his career. Opponents blocked five of those attempts.

On December 2, 2010, the Lions placed him on injured reserve due to an injured right knee.

Hanson was named NFC Special Teams Player of the Month for September 2011 after kicking a perfect 8 of 8 field goals. It was his fifth-career Special Teams Player of the Month award and his first since November 2003.

Hanson is the team's all-time leader in scoring, with 2,150 points, and in field goals with 495, and holds a variety of other team records for kicking and scoring. He represented the NFC in the Pro Bowl in 1998 and 1999, and was an alternate in 1997 and 2008. He has booted 17 game-winning field goals in his career; eight in regulation and nine in overtime.

On April 4, 2013, Hanson announced his retirement. At the time of his retirement, he was the oldest active player in the NFL, the last player to have played for the same team he played for prior to the advent of free agency, and the last active player to play at Milwaukee County Stadium.

Hanson was named the 2002 recipient of the Detroit Lions/Detroit Sports Broadcasters Association/Pro Football Writers Association's (PFWA) Media-Friendly "Good Guy" Award. The Good Guy Award is given yearly to the Detroit Lions player who shows consideration to, and cooperation with the media at all times during the course of the season. Hanson was also named Offensive Rookie Of The Year by the PFWA in 1992. As of 2024, he remains the only NFL kicker ever awarded that distinction.

The Detroit Lions inducted him into the Ring of Honor in fall 2013 at Ford Field for his success and dedication to Detroit Lions football.

== Career regular season statistics ==
Career high/best bolded

Regular season statistics
Season	Team (record)	G	FGM	FGA	%	<20	20-29	30-39	40-49	50+	LNG	BLK	XPM	XPA	%	PTS
1992	DET (5–11)	**16**	21	26	80.8	0–0	5–5	10–10	4–6	2–5	52	1	30	30	**100.0**	93
1993	DET (10–6)	**16**	**34**	**43**	79.1	1–1	8–8	15–15	7–12	3–7	53	1	28	28	**100.0**	130
1994	DET (9–7)	**16**	18	27	66.7	0–0	6–7	7–7	5–8	0–5	49	**3**	39	40	97.5	93
1995	DET (10–6)	**16**	28	34	82.4	**2–2**	4–4	**16–17**	5–10	1–1	**56**	**3**	48	48	**100.0**	132
1996	DET (5–11)	**16**	12	17	70.6	0–0	4–4	4–5	3–4	1–3	51	1	36	36	**100.0**	72
1997	DET (9–7)	**16**	26	29	89.7	0–0	10–10	8–9	5–5	3–5	55	0	39	40	97.5	117
1998	DET (5–11)	**16**	29	33	87.9	0–0	8–8	7–7	13–15	1–3	51	2	27	29	93.1	114
1999	DET (8–8)	**16**	26	32	81.3	0–0	8–8	4–4	10–12	4–8	52	0	28	29	96.6	106
2000	DET (9–7)	**16**	24	30	80.0	**2–2**	6–7	10–12	4–7	2–2	54	2	29	29	**100.0**	101
2001	DET (2–14)	**16**	21	30	70.0	1–1	2–2	8–8	6–12	4–7	54	1	23	23	**100.0**	86
2002	DET (3–13)	**16**	23	28	82.1	0–0	8–8	8–9	7–8	0–3	49	0	31	31	**100.0**	100
2003	DET (5–11)	**16**	22	23	**95.7**	0–0	7–7	6–6	5–6	4–4	54	0	26	27	96.3	92
2004	DET (6–10)	**16**	24	28	85.7	0–0	9–9	10–11	5–8	0–0	48	0	28	28	**100.0**	100
2005	DET (5–11)	15	19	24	79.2	1–1	9–9	3–3	4–7	2–4	52	1	27	27	**100.0**	84
2006	DET (3–13)	**16**	29	33	87.9	1–1	**12–12**	6–6	7–8	3–6	53	0	30	30	**100.0**	117
2007	DET (7–9)	**16**	29	35	82.9	1–1	4–5	10–12	11–13	3–4	53	**3**	35	36	97.2	122
2008	DET (0–16)	**16**	21	22	95.5	0–0	3–3	4–5	6–6	**8–8**	**56**	2	25	26	96.2	88
2009	DET (2–14)	**16**	21	28	75.0	0–0	5–5	8–9	8–11	1–4	50	0	25	25	**100.0**	88
2010	DET (6–10)	8	12	14	85.7	0–0	1–1	4–4	4–5	3–4	52	0	19	19	**100.0**	55
2011	DET (10–6)	**16**	24	29	82.8	0–0	9–9	8–9	2–4	5–7	51	1	**54**	**54**	**100.0**	126
2012	DET (4–12)	**16**	32	36	88.9	1–1	3–3	10–10	**16–19**	2–3	53	0	38	38	**100.0**	**134**
Career (21 seasons)		327	495	601	82.4	10–10	131–134	166–178	137–186	52–93	56	21	665	673	98.8	2150

== Career highlights ==
=== Awards and honors ===
NFL

- Second-team All-Pro (1997)
- 2× Pro Bowl (1997, 1999)
- PFWA Offensive Rookie of the Year (1992)
- PFWA All-Rookie Team (1992)
- Pride of the Lions
- Detroit Lions 75th Anniversary Team
- Detroit Lions All-Time Team

College

- College Football Hall of Fame inductee (class of 2020)
- NFF National Scholar-Athlete Award
- Unanimous All-American (1989)
- First-team All-American (1991)
- Third-team All-American (1990)
- 3× First-team All-Pac-10 (1989–1991)

Other

- Washington State University Athletics Hall of Fame (2001)
- Michigan Sports Hall of Fame (2014)
- State of Washington Sports Hall of Fame (2019)

=== Records ===
==== NFL records ====
- Most field goals of 40 or more yards (career) – 189
- Most consecutive field goals of 40 or more yards – 24 (2007–09)
- Most career game winning field goals in overtime – 9 (tied with Jason Elam, Jim Breech, and Steve Christie)
- Most career games with one NFL team – 327 (1992–2012)
- Most career seasons with one NFL team – 21 (1992–2012)
- Most career points with one NFL team – 2,150
- First player in NFL history to score 2,000 points with one franchise

==== Detroit Lions franchise records ====
- Most career points scored – 2,150

== Personal life ==
Hanson and his wife, Kathleen, were married in 1992 and have three children. His younger brother Travis was a kicker for the rival University of Washington Huskies, and was a member of the 1991 national championship team. Hanson is a Christian.
