= Kerwin Waldroup =

American football player (born 1974)

No. 93
- Position: Defensive end

Personal information
- Born: August 1, 1974 (age 52); Country Club Hills, Illinois, U.S.
- Listed height: 6 ft 3 in (1.91 m)
- Listed weight: 260 lb (118 kg)

Career information
- High school: Olympia Fields (IL) Rich Central
- College: Michigan; Central State
- NFL draft: 1996: 5th round, 158th overall pick

Career history
- Detroit Lions (1996–1998)

Career NFL statistics
- Tackles: 69
- Sacks: 5
- Fumble recoveries: 2
- Stats at Pro Football Reference

Kerwin Waldroup (born August 1, 1974) is an American former professional football player who was a defensive end for three seasons with the Detroit Lions of the National Football League (NFL. He initially played college football for the Michigan Wolverines before transferring and finishing with the Central State Marauders in Wilberforce, Ohio. He is a graduate of Rich Central High School. Following his football career, he served jail time for child abuse.

== Career ==
Waldroup was born on August 1, 1974, in Country Club Hills, Illinois. He was a member of the 1992, 1993 and 1994 Michigan Wolverines, wearing the number 59. He recorded no stats in 1992, and only one tackle in 1993. In 1994, he posted a total of 32 tackles including 10 against Illinois on October 22 and 8 against Colorado in The Miracle at Michigan. The final game in which he recorded any stats for Michigan was on October 29, 1994, against Purdue. He is not credited with earning a varsity letter in any season at Michigan. In the week after the Purdue game, Waldroup told Michigan's coaches that he was quitting the team. Head coach Gary Moeller delayed announcing Waldroup's departure until early November, in hopes that Waldroup would reconsider. Moeller told reporters that "academics may have played a part in Waldroup's decision."

Waldroup was selected in the fifth round of the 1996 NFL Draft by the Lions. Waldroup recorded 69 solo tackles and five quarterback sacks in his three-year career in the National Football League. He had a career-high six tackles in three games, including back-to-back games in October for the 1996 Detroit Lions.

== Post-football ==
In December 2006, Waldroup was faced with four charges of false imprisonment, child abuse and depriving a victim of a phone. He allegedly held his girlfriend, Sheri Amos, and her children ages 10, 13 and 16 for two days at a Ramada Inn hotel near Interstate 95 in St. Augustine, Florida. He pleaded no contest to child abuse and was sentenced to six months in jail to be followed by 2 years of probation.
