= Tom Moore (American football coach, born 1938) =

American football player and coach (born 1938)

Iowa Hawkeyes
- Title: Analyst

Personal information
- Born: November 7, 1938 (age 87); Owatonna, Minnesota, U.S.

Career information
- Position: Quarterback
- High school: Rochester, Minnesota
- College: Iowa (1958–1960)

Career history
- Iowa (1961–1962) Graduate assistant; Dayton (1965–1968) Running backs coach; Wake Forest (1969) Offensive coordinator; Georgia Tech (1970–1971) Running backs coach; Minnesota (1972–1973) Running backs coach; New York Stars (1974) Offensive coordinator; Minnesota (1975–1976) Offensive coordinator; Pittsburgh Steelers (1977–1989); Wide receivers coach (1977–1982); Offensive coordinator (1983–1989); Minnesota Vikings (1990–1993) Assistant head coach; Detroit Lions (1994–1996) Offensive coordinator; New Orleans Saints (1997) Running backs coach; Indianapolis Colts (1998–2010); Offensive coordinator (1998–2008); Senior offensive coordinator (2009); Senior offensive assistant & offensive consultant (2010); New York Jets (2011) Offensive consultant; Tennessee Titans (2012) Offensive consultant; Arizona Cardinals (2013–2017) Assistant head coach & offensive consultant; Tampa Bay Buccaneers (2019–2025) Offensive consultant; Iowa (2026–present) Senior consultant & offensive advisor

Awards and highlights
- 4× Super Bowl champion (XIII, XIV, XLI, LV); National champion (1958)
- Coaching profile at Pro Football Reference

Tom Moore (born November 7, 1938) is an American football coach and former player. A four-time Super Bowl champion, he spent a majority of his coaching career in the National Football League (NFL) with the Pittsburgh Steelers and Indianapolis Colts. He is known for his development of quarterbacks such as Terry Bradshaw, Peyton Manning, Carson Palmer, and Baker Mayfield.

== Early life ==
Moore learned football at an early age in Mt. Pleasant, Iowa. He played quarterback at the University of Iowa, where he earned a bachelor's degree in history and became a member of the Iowa Beta chapter of Sigma Alpha Epsilon fraternity. Moore coached at Iowa after graduation and then joined the Army for two years, when he also coached football overseas.

== Coaching career ==
Moore resumed his college coaching career at the University of Dayton, where he coached offensive backs and received a graduate degree in guidance counseling. When he left Dayton in 1968, Moore went on to coach offense for nine years at Wake Forest University, the Georgia Institute of Technology, the University of Minnesota, and for the New York Stars of the World Football League (WFL).

Moore made the transition to the NFL in 1977 when he joined Chuck Noll's coaching staff at the Pittsburgh Steelers, initially serving as receivers coach. Within three years on the Steelers, Moore earned two Super Bowl rings and in 1983 he was promoted to quarterbacks coach and offensive coordinator. For eight years, Moore and Tony Dungy, the Colts' head coach from 2002 to 2009, were colleagues on Noll's coaching staff at Pittsburgh.

Leaving the Steelers in 1990, Moore served in senior offensive coaching roles for three teams in eight years, having the most success as offensive coordinator for the Detroit Lions, the team which led the NFL in total offense in 1995 and was the first team in NFL history to have two receivers with over 100 catches in a season (Herman Moore and Brett Perriman).

=== Indianapolis Colts ===
Moore interviewed for the Lions' head coaching job in 2006, but the Lions hired Rod Marinelli.

The Indianapolis Colts, for whom Moore served as an offensive coordinator since 1998, won Super Bowl XLI in February 2007. Moore coached the offense under head coaches Jim Mora, Dungy and Jim Caldwell. He oversaw the development of quarterback Peyton Manning for Manning's entire tenure with the Colts. Manning started every single game for the Colts over that time period, going 117–59 in the regular season and 9–9 in the playoffs, also setting numerous NFL records, including highest passer rating, season (121.1 in 2004, subsequently surpassed by Aaron Rodgers in 2011) and for most passing touchdowns in a season with 49, also in 2004 (since surpassed by Tom Brady, 50 touchdowns in 2007 and by Manning himself with 55 touchdowns in 2013).

On May 6, 2009, ESPN reported that Moore was planning to retire due to a change in the NFL's pension program which affected both him and the Colts' offensive line coach, Howard Mudd. Larry Kennan, the executive director of the NFL Coaches' Association, said Moore had not yet filed his retirement papers but believed that he was "just about there." On May 20, 2009, Moore returned to the Colts to serve as their senior offensive coordinator, though he ultimately left the organization following the 2010 season. On July 21, 2011, it was announced that Moore would take a job with the New York Jets as a remote working offensive consultant.

=== Arizona Cardinals ===
On January 21, 2013, it was announced Bruce Arians had brought in Tom Moore and to help him overhaul the worst offense in the NFL. Moore served as assistant head coach/offense for the Arizona Cardinals until the end of the 2017 season.

=== Tampa Bay Buccaneers ===
In August 2019, it was announced that Moore had agreed to be an offensive consultant for the Buccaneers for the 2019 season. He remained there 6 more seasons, winning his fourth Super Bowl in Super Bowl LV. He announced his retirement on January 8, 2026, after 47 seasons in the NFL.

=== Iowa Hawkeyes ===
On May 12, 2026, Moore reversed his retirement, and joined the Iowa Hawkeyes as a senior consultant to the head coach and offensive advisor.

== Honors ==
In May 2014, Moore was inducted into the Pennsylvania Sports Hall of Fame in recognition of his 13 seasons as an assistant coach with the Pittsburgh Steelers.

In 2015, Moore was selected as part of the 2015 class for the Paul “Dr. Z” Zimmerman Award by the Pro Football Writers of America. This award is given for lifetime achievements as an assistant coach in the NFL.
