= Zefross Moss =

American football player (born 1966)

No. 73, 71, 77
- Position: Tackle

Personal information
- Born: August 17, 1966 (age 60); Tuscaloosa, Alabama, U.S.
- Listed height: 6 ft 6 in (1.98 m)
- Listed weight: 325 lb (147 kg)

Career information
- High school: Holt (AL)
- College: Alabama State
- NFL draft: 1988: undrafted

Career history
- Dallas Cowboys (1988); Indianapolis Colts (1989–1994); Detroit Lions (1995–1996); New England Patriots (1997–1999)

Awards and highlights
- All-SWC (1987); Black College All-American (1987)

Career NFL statistics
- Games played: 154
- Games started: 137
- Stats at Pro Football Reference

Zefross Moss (born August 17, 1966) is an American former professional football player who was an offensive tackle in the National Football League (NFL) for the Dallas Cowboys, Indianapolis Colts, Detroit Lions and New England Patriots. He played college football for Alabama State.

== Early life ==
Moss attended Holt High School. He received All-state honors at offensive tackle as a senior.

He accepted a scholarship from Alabama State University. He was a two-year starter at right tackle, receiving All-Southwest Athletic Conference and Black College All-American honors as a senior.

== Professional career ==
=== Dallas Cowboys ===
Moss was signed as an undrafted free agent by the Dallas Cowboys after the 1988 NFL draft on April 29. He was waived on August 23. He was later re-signed on December 8 and declared inactive for 2 games.

On August 22, 1989, he was traded to the Indianapolis Colts in exchange for a tenth round draft choice (#249-Pat Newman).

=== Indianapolis Colts ===
In 1989, the Indianapolis Colts acquired Moss because they needed to improve their depth at the offensive tackle position. He played in 16 games on special teams.

In 1990, he was named the starter at left tackle and became one of the largest offensive linemen in the league.

In 1991, he started 9 games at left tackle and one contest at right guard. He missed 4 games with a sprained ankle and one contest with a knee injury.

In 1992, he started 13 games at left tackle. He missed 3 games with ankle injuries. In 1993, he was moved to right tackle and started 16 games.

In 1994, he missed the last 5 games with a knee injury, but still contributed to the Colts rushing for 2,060 yards and allowing only 28 sacks, at the time tied for the fewest sacks in a 16-game schedule.

=== Detroit Lions ===
On May 1, 1995, he signed with the Detroit Lions as a free agent. He didn't participate in the first 3 weeks of training camp while rehabbing his previous knee injury, but was still able to make the season opener as the team's starting right tackle. He also played in the Wild Card playoff game against the Philadelphia Eagles.

In 1996, he only allowed 2.5 sacks and helped Barry Sanders lead the league in rushing with 1,553 yards.

=== New England Patriots ===
On March 31, 1997, he was signed by the New England Patriots as a free agent. He was a two-year starter at right tackle, until being released to free salary cap space on March 23, 2000.

== Personal life ==
After retiring from football, he moved to Madison, Alabama. Moss initiated several business opportunities, including housing developments and ice cream shops. He was a little-league football coach for the Madison Patriots.
