= Allen Williams (American football) =

American football player (born 1972)

No. 21
- Positions: Running back, Kick returner

Personal information
- Born: September 17, 1972 (age 54); Thomasville, Georgia, U.S.
- Listed height: 5 ft 11 in (1.80 m)
- Listed weight: 205 lb (93 kg)

Career information
- High school: Thomasville
- College: Georgia Military (1991–1992); Maryland (1993–1994)
- NFL draft: 1995: undrafted

Career history
- Carolina Panthers (1995)*; Detroit Lions (1995–1997); Amsterdam Admirals (1998)*
- * Offseason or practice squad member only

Career NFL statistics
- Games played: 5
- Return yards: 100
- Stats at Pro Football Reference

Allen Williams (born September 17, 1972) is an American former professional football player who was a wide receiver and kick returner for the Detroit Lions of the National Football League (NFL). He played college football for the Georgia Military Bulldogs and Maryland Terrapins.

== Early life ==
Williams was born on September 17, 1972, in Thomasville, Georgia, where he attended Thomasville High School. On National Signing Day, he signed to played college football at the Georgia Military College.

== College career ==
Williams played college football for the Georgia Military Bulldogs from 1991 to 1992 and Maryland Terrapins from 1993 to 1994. After two seasons for Georgia Military, he transferred to the University of Maryland. Williams had 251 rushing yards with one touchdown and five receptions for 32 yards in his first year. He also returned 30 kickoffs for 621 yards. As a senior, Williams rushed for 649 yards and one touchdown with 51 catches for 357 yards and a score. He earned honorable mention All-Atlantic Coast Conference honors in 1994.

== Professional career ==
=== Carolina Panthers ===
After going unselected in the 1995 NFL draft, Williams signed with the Carolina Panthers as an undrafted free agent. On July 15, he was waived.

=== Detroit Lions ===
On July 19, 1995, Williams was picked up off waivers by the Detroit Lions. On August 28, he was released and signed to the practice squad. On November 20, Williams was elevated to the active roster. He played in the final five games of the season, including the Wild Card game against the Philadelphia Eagles, at kick returner. Williams returned seven kicks for 131 yards but also lost two fumbles. On February 16, 1996, he became a free agent. On March 25, Williams re-signed with the Lions. On August 27, he was waived and signed to the practice squad. On February 28, 1997, Williams was re-signed by the team. On August 18, he was released by the team.

=== Amsterdam Admirals ===
On February 18, 1998, Williams was signed by the Amsterdam Admirals of NFL Europe. He was released before he played a game for the team.
