= Kevin Hickman =

American football player (born 1971)

No. 15, 82, 46
- Position: Tight end

Personal information
- Born: August 20, 1971 (age 55); Cherry Hill, New Jersey, U.S.
- Listed height: 6 ft 4 in (1.93 m)
- Listed weight: 258 lb (117 kg)

Career information
- High school: Delran (NJ) Holy Cross Academy; Harlingen (TX) Marine Military
- College: Navy
- NFL draft: 1995: 6th round, 186th overall pick

Career history
- Detroit Lions (1995–1997); Philadelphia Eagles (1998)*; Detroit Lions (1998)
- * Offseason or practice squad member only
- Stats at Pro Football Reference

Kevin Joseph Hickman (born August 20, 1971) is an American former professional football tight end who played in the National Football League (NFL) for the Detroit Lions from 1995 to 1998.

== Biography ==
Born in Cherry Hill, New Jersey, Hickman played high school football at Holy Cross Academy and Marine Military Academy. He attended the United States Naval Academy but left before completing his degree to play in the NFL. Hickman later sued the United States Naval Academy in an attempt to avoid paying tuition fees owed after resigning from his military obligation. He was drafted in the sixth round of the 1995 NFL Draft by the Lions.

After his NFL career he returned to school a received a bachelor's degree from the University of South Carolina in 2001, a master's degree from American InterContinental University in 2007, and doctorate in education from Northcentral University in 2016. Hickman has worked as a high school athletic administrator at schools in California, Nevada, Arizona, and Ohio.
