= Eric Stocz =

American football player (born 1974)

No. 49, 82
- Position: Tight end

Personal information
- Born: May 25, 1974 (age 52); Warren, Ohio, U.S.
- Listed height: 6 ft 4 in (1.93 m)
- Listed weight: 275 lb (125 kg)

Career information
- High school: Cortland (OH) Lakeview
- College: Westminster
- NFL draft: 1996: undrafted

Career history
- Houston Oilers (1996)*; Detroit Lions (1996–1998); Buffalo Bills (1999)*; Philadelphia Eagles (2000)*; New York/New Jersey Hitmen (2001)
- * Offseason or practice squad member only

Awards and highlights
- National Champion Division II 1995
- Stats at Pro Football Reference

Eric Stocz (born May 25, 1974) is an American former professional football player who was a tight end for the Detroit Lions of the National Football League (NFL) from 1996 to 1998. He was a member of the Buffalo Bills during the 1999 NFL off-season before he was cut at the end of training camp. He then spent the 2000 off-season with the Philadelphia Eagles, before being waived in June 2000, ending his NFL career.

Stocz would then be drafted on the third day of the inaugural XFL draft by the New York/New Jersey Hitmen, with whom he played the 2001 season with, logging a tackle on special teams during game play.

Following his retirement from professional football, Stocz would begin playing poker competitively, appearing in various tournaments and competitions, including a slew of World Series of Poker events from 2009 to, most recently, 2022.
