= Richard Woodley =

American football player (born 1972)

No. 24
- Position: Defensive back

Personal information
- Born: January 13, 1972 (age 54); Texas City, Texas, U.S.
- Listed height: 5 ft 9 in (1.75 m)
- Listed weight: 180 lb (82 kg)

Career information
- High school: La Marque
- College: TCU
- NFL draft: 1994: undrafted

Career history
- Detroit Lions (1994–1996)
- Stats at Pro Football Reference

Richard L. Woodley (born January 13, 1972) is an American former professional football player who was a defensive back for the Detroit Lions of the National Football League (NFL). He played college football for the TCU Horned Frogs.
