= Tommie Boyd =

American football player (born 1971)

No. 80
- Position: Wide receiver

Personal information
- Born: December 21, 1971 (age 54); Lansing, Michigan, U.S.
- Listed height: 6 ft 0 in (1.83 m)
- Listed weight: 195 lb (88 kg)

Career information
- High school: Eastern Lansing
- College: Toledo (1990-1995)
- NFL draft: 1995: undrafted

Career history
- Detroit Lions (1995)*; Rhein Fire (1996); Detroit Lions (1996-1997)*; Detroit Lions (1997–1998); Cincinnati Bengals (1999)*; Tampa Bay Storm (2001)*; Detroit Fury (2001); Buffalo Destroyers (2002)
- * Offseason or practice squad member only
- Stats at Pro Football Reference

Tommie Leeshay Boyd (born December 21, 1971) is an American former professional football player who was a wide receiver for the Detroit Lions of the National Football League (NFL) from 1997 to 1998. He played college football for the Toledo Rockets.

== Early life ==
Boyd attended Lansing Eastern High School in Lansing, Michigan, where he played football and ran track. He played as a quarterback and received honorable mention on the CAC All-Conference Team in 1988. With the 400 meter relay team he won the CAC championship, the regionals and placed second in the state championship in 1989. He also returned as a quarterback for his senior year at Lansing and competed in track meets. He committed to play college football for the Toledo Rockets in February 1990. He played in the Michigan High School Football All-Star Game.

== College career ==
Boyd played as a split end and punt and kick returner in college for the Toledo Rockets five years from 1990 to 1995.

== Professional career ==
After going unselected in the 1995 NFL draft, Boyd signed as a free agent with the Detroit Lions in April 1995 and took part in their minicamp. On August 19, 1995 he was released by the Lions together with nine other players. Boyd signed with the German club Rhein Fire of the World League of American Football for the 1996 season. In July 1996 he had a try-out with the Detroit Lions and participated in the free agent camp. He was waived on August 22, 1996, after struggling with a shoulder injury during training camp. He signed with the practice squad afterwards.

On February 20, 1997 he resigned with the Lions. In July 1997 he once again played in the training camp with the Lions. He made in August the 1997 Lions roster. He made his debut on August 31, 1997, against the Atlanta Falcons where he played in two offensive plays and with the punt team. In 16 games played, he had 10 receptions for 142 yards. On April 18, 1998 he re-signed with the Detroit Lions together with Kez McCorvey. In July 1998 he returned to the Lions training camp for the fourth year in a row. He and Germane Crowell both were in the running for the spot of third receiver but lost the role during the season. After the season he was one of five players left available for the 1999 NFL expansion draft but was not chosen.

On March 31, 1999 he was cut by the Lions and signed a two-year contract with the Cincinnati Bengals on April 8, 1999. On August 23, 1999 he was cut by the Bengals. In April 2000 he had try-outs with the Oakland Raiders and New York Jets. In 2001 he signed with the Tampa Bay Storm but was traded to the expansion team Detroit Fury where he played the 2001 Arena Football League season. In November 2001, he was left unprotected for the Expansion draft for the Dallas Desperados. He was selected by the Buffalo Destroyers who traded for the pick. In December 2002 he was released by Buffalo.
