= Tom E. Beer =

American football player (born 1969)

Tom Beer
No. 48, 51
- Positions: Linebacker, running back

Personal information
- Born: March 27, 1969 (age 57); Bay Port, Michigan, U.S.
- Listed height: 6 ft 1 in (1.85 m)
- Listed weight: 221 lb (100 kg)

Career information
- College: Saginaw Valley State; Wayne State
- NFL draft: 1994: 7th round, 215th overall pick

Career history
- Detroit Lions (1994–1996)

Career NFL statistics
- Tackles: 2
- Stats at Pro Football Reference

Thomas E. Beer (born March 27, 1969) is a former National Football League (NFL) player.

== Playing career ==
Beer played high school football at Elkton-Pigeon-Bay Port High School, a consolidated high school in the thumb area of Michigan. He went on to play college basketball for Saginaw Valley State University before transferring to Wayne State University.

Beer was drafted in the seventh round of the 1994 NFL draft by the Detroit Lions. He played fullback in 1994, and linebacker in 1995 and 1996. During his time with the Lions, Beer was among the team leaders in special teams tackles. He started one game at strongside linebacker during the 1996 season.

Beer's career ended following the 1996 season. Doctors had recommended retirement following a series of neurological testing.

== Personal life ==
Beer is not related to the earlier NFL player named Tom Beer.

Beer has participated in Lions alumni and charity events since his retirement.
