= Jeff Jones (gridiron football) =

American gridiron football player (born 1972)

No. 70, 59
- Position: Offensive tackle

Personal information
- Born: May 30, 1972 (age 54); Killeen, Texas, U.S.
- Listed height: 6 ft 6 in (1.98 m)
- Listed weight: 310 lb (141 kg)

Career information
- High school: Killeen
- College: Texas A&M
- NFL draft: 1995: undrafted

Career history
- Detroit Lions (1995–1996); BC Lions (1998)

Career NFL statistics
- Games played: 8
- Stats at Pro Football Reference

Jeffery Raymond Jones (born May 30, 1972) is an American former professional football player who was an offensive tackle for two seasons with the Detroit Lions of the National Football League (NFL). After having played with the team in 1995 and 1996, he joined the BC Lions of the Canadian Football League (CFL). He played college football for the Texas A&M Aggies.
