= Herman Moore =

American football player (born 1969)

No. 84, 82
- Position: Wide receiver

Personal information
- Born: October 20, 1969 (age 57); Danville, Virginia, U.S.
- Listed height: 6 ft 4 in (1.93 m)
- Listed weight: 218 lb (99 kg)

Career information
- High school: George Washington (Danville)
- College: Virginia (1988–1990)
- NFL draft: 1991: 1st round, 10th overall pick

Career history
- Detroit Lions (1991–2001); New York Giants (2002)

Awards and highlights
- 3× First-team All-Pro (1995–1997); 4× Pro Bowl (1994–1997); 2× NFL receptions leader (1995, 1997); Pride of the Lions; Detroit Lions 75th Anniversary Team; Detroit Lions All-Time Team; Consensus All-American (1990); First-team All-ACC (1990); Second-team All-ACC (1989); Virginia Cavaliers Jersey No. 87 retired; Virginia Sports Hall of Fame

Career NFL statistics
- Receptions: 670
- Receiving yards: 9,174
- Receiving touchdowns: 62
- Stats at Pro Football Reference
- College Football Hall of Fame

Herman Joseph Moore (born October 20, 1969) is an American former professional football player who was a wide receiver for 12 seasons in the National Football League (NFL). He played college football for the Virginia Cavaliers and was selected by the Detroit Lions in the first round of the 1991 NFL draft, and also played for the New York Giants.

== Early life ==
Moore graduated from George Washington High School in Danville, Virginia, in 1987. Moore was a three-sport athlete, excelling in basketball, football, and track and field.

== College career ==
Moore attended and graduated from the University of Virginia, where he was a two-sport athlete. He ranks third all-time in career receptions, behind Olamide Zaccheaus and Billy McMullen, and held the school record in the high jump for 30 years until it was broken in 2020. Moore's college jersey number was 87.

He ranks second in Cavaliers history in career receiving yards with 2,504 and ranks first in receiving yards in a season with 1,190 yards (on 54 catches) set in 1990. The year before he had 848 yards on just 36 catches. He also scored 10 touchdowns in 1989 and followed that up with 13 in 1990.

On January 14, 2026, Moore was inducted into the College Football Hall of Fame.

== Professional career ==
Pre-draft measurables
Height	Weight	Arm length	Hand span
6 ft 3 1/2 in (1.92 m)	205 lb (93 kg)	34 1/2 in (0.88 m)	9 3/4 in (0.25 m)
All values from NFL Combine

Moore was the Detroit Lions' first-round draft pick in 1991 and went on to shatter virtually all of Detroit's receiving records.

Moore started his career in 1991 with limited time, as he caught just eleven passes for 135 yards; he had apparently neglected to tell the Lions that he had worn contact lenses while in college to see, for which he had decided to not wear in the pros. At any rate, an eye check helped reveal the problem, which was soon fixed. He eventually became a key part of the team's run to the playoffs, as the Lions won the NFC Central title for the first time since 1983. In the divisional-round game against the Dallas Cowboys, Moore caught six passes for 87 yards with a touchdown (thrown by Erik Kramer) as the Lions prevailed 38–6 to win their first playoff game since 1957. In the NFC Championship Game against Washington, he caught four passes for 69 yards in the 41–10 loss.

He started the first week of the subsequent season and caught eight passes for 82 yards before being put on injured reserve for the next four weeks. In his return against the Minnesota Vikings, he caught his first regular season touchdown pass, doing so in the fourth quarter from Erik Kramer in a 31–14 loss. He caught 51 passes for 966 yards with four touchdowns in twelve games. The next year, he caught 61 passes in 15 games with 935 yards and six touchdowns as the Lions won the NFC Central once again. In the Wild Card game, he caught one pass for 20 yards in the loss.

He fully stepped into well-done play in 1994, as he was named to his first Pro Bowl. Playing in all sixteen games, he caught 72 passes for 1,173 yards for eleven touchdowns. He elevated his play even further the next year, which included being named the team MVP on offense. He set a new league record for receptions in a season with 123 while setting a club record in receiving yards with 1,686, scoring 14 touchdowns. In the October 29 game, he caught three touchdown passes in a game against the Green Bay Packers. It was the last time for a decade that a receiver from the Lions would do so (Roy Williams was the next receiver to do so). That same year, Moore had one of his most memorable games on November 23 (Thanksgiving Day) against the Minnesota Vikings. Moore (127 yards) and fellow receivers Brett Perriman (153) and Johnnie Morton (102) all eclipsed the 100-yard receiving mark, running back Barry Sanders rushed for 138 yards, and quarterback Scott Mitchell passed for 410 yards in a 44-38 Lions' victory. His finest single-game performance came on December 4, 1995, against the Chicago Bears when he had a club record 14 catches for 183 yards, the fifth best total in Detroit history. He was named to the Pro Bowl for the second straight year while the Lions made it to the playoffs for the fourth time in five seasons. Moore and teammate Brett Perriman (108 catches) became the first teammates in NFL history with more than 100 receptions in the same season. Moore continued his run in 1996 with 106 catches for 1,296 yards with nine touchdowns. He then became the second receiver (after Jerry Rice) to have three 100-reception seasons, as he led the league with 104 receptions for 1,293 yards and eight touchdowns. He was named to the Pro Bowl for the fourth straight time with a third consecutive All-Pro selection while the Lions made the playoffs after a two-year hiatus. However, the Lions would lose a chaotic playoff game to the Philadelphia Eagles, with Moore catching seven passes for 133 yards for a touchdown (his second and last career touchdown in the postseason) in the 58–37 loss.

The next three years were not as positive for Moore. He regressed to 82 catches for 983 yards with five touchdowns in 1998, the last season with Barry Sanders on the roster. 1999 was the sixth playoff season for the Lions in the decade, but it did not result in good fortune. Moore played just eight games while catching sixteen passes for 197 yards with two touchdowns. In the Wild Card game that year, he caught three passes for 69 yards. After playing three games for the Lions in 2001 with just four catches (to total 145 games played with Detroit), he moved to the New York Giants for the following year. He was inactive for two of the three games on the Giants roster before being let go.

In 12 NFL seasons, Moore had 670 receptions for 9,174 yards and 62 touchdowns. Moore holds NFL records for both receptions (61) and receiving yards (965) on Thursday games (helped by playing for the Lions, a perpetual team on Thanksgiving Day; his efforts in the 1998 game resulted in the inaugural All-Iron Award being awarded to him). He held Detroit's records for career receptions (670) until it was surpassed by Calvin Johnson in the fifth week of the 2015 NFL season. On November 10, 2013, his touchdown catch record of 62 was surpassed by Johnson at Chicago. On December 8, 2013, Johnson also broke his career receiving yards record of 9,174. In 2010, Moore was inducted into the Virginia Sports Hall of Fame and the Michigan Sports Hall of Fame that same year.

== NFL career statistics ==
Year	Team	GP	Receiving						Fumbles	
Year	Team	GP	Rec	Yds	Avg	Lng	TD	FD	Fum	Lost
1991	DET	13	11	135	12.3	21	0	7	0	0
1992	DET	12	51	966	18.9	77	4	37	0	0
1993	DET	15	61	935	15.3	93	6	43	2	1
1994	DET	16	72	1,173	16.3	51	11	56	1	1
1995	DET	16	123	1,686	13.7	69	14	90	2	2
1996	DET	16	106	1,296	12.2	50	9	71	0	0
1997	DET	16	104	1,293	12.4	79	8	66	0	0
1998	DET	15	82	983	12.0	36	5	50	0	0
1999	DET	8	16	197	12.3	26	2	11	0	0
2000	DET	15	40	434	10.9	30	3	24	0	0
2001	DET	3	4	76	19.0	25	0	3	0	0
2002	NYG	1	0	0	0.0	0	0	0	0	0
Career		146	670	9,174	13.7	93	62	458	5	4
