= Greg Jeffries =

American football player (born 1971)

No. 25
- Position: Defensive back

Personal information
- Born: October 16, 1971 (age 55); High Point, North Carolina, U.S.
- Listed height: 5 ft 9 in (1.75 m)
- Listed weight: 195 lb (88 kg)

Career information
- High school: T.W. Andrews (High Point)
- College: Virginia
- NFL draft: 1993: 6th round, 147th overall pick

Career history
- Detroit Lions (1993–1998); Miami Dolphins (1999–2000)

Awards and highlights
- Second-team All-ACC (1991)

Career NFL statistics
- Tackles: 165
- Interceptions: 3
- Fumble recoveries: 2
- Stats at Pro Football Reference

Gregory Lemont Jeffries (born October 16, 1971) is an American former professional football player who was a safety in the National Football League (NFL) for two teams. He played college football for the Virginia Cavaliers and was selected by the Detroit Lions in the sixth round of the 1993 NFL draft with the 147th overall pick.
