= Chuck Schmidt (American football) =

American football executive (born 1947)

Personal information
- Born: 1947 (age 78–79)

Career information
- College: Michigan; Wayne State

Career history
- Detroit Lions (1987) Controller; Detroit Lions (1988–1989) Vice president for finance; Detroit Lions (1990–2000) Executive vice president and chief operating officer
- Executive profile at Pro Football Reference

Chuck Schmidt (born 1947) is an American football executive, best known for his 25-year association with the Detroit Lions of the National Football League (NFL).

== Career ==
After graduating from the University of Michigan with a bachelor's degree in business administration and from Wayne State University with a master's degree in finance, Schmidt joined the front office of the Detroit Lions of the National Football League (NFL) in the mid-1970s. By 1988, he was appointed as vice president for finance and worked under general manager Russ Thomas. In December 1989, Thomas announced his retirement and Schmidt was appointed in a new joint position of executive vice president and chief operating officer. Vice president of player personnel Jerry Vainisi was speculated to succeed Thomas, but they fell out over the course of the season, resulting in Schmidt's promotion. Because of his lack of football experience, Schmidt was not considered a general manager, so the Lions allowed their head coaches to run football operations during his tenure.

Schmidt's position with the Lions coincided with the rise of running back Barry Sanders. However, the Lions struggled to find a franchise quarterback to accompany Sanders, despite drafting Heisman Trophy winner Andre Ware in the first round, who ended up as a third-string behind Rodney Peete and Erik Kramer. In back-to-back off-seasons, Schmidt passed on Joe Montana and Warren Moon, perceiving them to be too old; Montana continued his career with the Kansas City Chiefs, while Moon's career lasted until 2000. Schmidt instead opted for free agent Scott Mitchell, who had backed up Dan Marino of the Miami Dolphins, but his time in Detroit is considered to be largely unsuccessful. In January 2001, Schmidt resigned from his role with the Lions, a day after Matt Millen was announced as the new general manager. In his ten seasons as executive vice president, the Lions made the playoffs on six occasions but never made it to the Super Bowl, coming up short in the 1991 NFC Championship Game.

In 2006, Schmidt joined the Baker Group, a financial planning company based in Southfield, Michigan. He currently serves as vice president and heads the company's Western Florida Office.
