= Eric Lynch (American football) =

American football player (born 1970)

No. 26, 25
- Position: Running back

Personal information
- Born: May 16, 1970 (age 56); Woodhaven, Michigan, U.S.
- Listed height: 5 ft 10 in (1.78 m)
- Listed weight: 224 lb (102 kg)

Career information
- High school: Woodhaven
- College: Grand Valley State (1988–1991)
- NFL draft: 1992: undrafted

Career history
- Detroit Lions (1992–1996); Scottish Claymores (1998)

Career NFL statistics
- Rushing yards: 209
- Rushing average: 3.7
- Touchdowns: 2
- Stats at Pro Football Reference

Eric D. Lynch (born May 16, 1970) is an American former professional football player who was a running back for the Detroit Lions of the National Football League (NFL). He played college football for the Grand Valley State Lakers.

He was inducted into Grand Valley States Hall of Fame.
