= Kez McCorvey =

American gridiron football player and coach (born 1972)

Edmonton Eskimos
- Title: Wide receiver
- CFL status: American

Personal information
- Born: January 23, 1972 (age 54); Gautier, Mississippi, U.S.

Career information
- High school: Pascagoula
- College: Florida State
- NFL draft: 1995: 5th round, 156th overall pick

Career history

Playing
- 1995–1997: Detroit Lions
- 1999: Rhein Fire
- 2000–2001: Edmonton Eskimos

Coaching
- 2012: Toronto Argonauts (WR coach)
- 2014–present: Edmonton Eskimos (WR coach)

Awards and highlights
- Grey Cup champion (2015); National champion (1993); 2× First-team All-ACC (1993, 1994)

Career NFL statistics
- Receptions: 2
- Receiving yards: 9
- Touchdowns: 0
- Stats at Pro Football Reference

Kezarrick Montines McCorvey (born January 23, 1972) is an American former professional football player. He was selected by the Detroit Lions in the fifth round of the 1995 NFL draft. He played for six years as a wide receiver and special-teams player, spending three seasons (1995–97) with the Lions of the National Football League (NFL), one season (1999) with the Rhein Fire in NFL Europe, and two seasons (2000–01) with the Edmonton Eskimos of the Canadian Football League (CFL).

A standout wide receiver at Florida State University, McCorvey was chosen in the fifth round of the 1995 NFL Draft, going to Detroit as the 156th overall pick. He spent his three-year career with the Lions playing mostly on special teams; as a receiver he recorded just two career catches in nine games played. He found much greater success in the CFL as a receiver for Edmonton during the 2000 season: He was named a league all-star, tied the team record for most touchdowns in a single game with four, and tied Milt Stegall for most touchdowns during the season with 15.

McCorvey was a four-year starter at Florida State from 1990 to 1994, a span in which the Seminoles won five bowl games, three consecutive undefeated Atlantic Coast Conference championships (1992–94), and the 1993 national championship. His 192 career receptions placed him second only to Ron Sellers in the FSU record books at the time. As a junior on the 1993 championship team, McCorvey recorded 74 receptions, also second to Sellers at the time. (As of 2016, McCorvey ranks fourth all-time in career and single-season receptions for FSU, and fifth all-time in receiving yardage.) McCorvey earned all-ACC honors in 1992 and 1993, and multiple all-American honors as a senior in 1994. He was a semifinalist for the 1994 Fred Biletnikoff Award. He had at least one reception in each of the last 32 games of his FSU career. He graduated from FSU in 1995 with a degree in sociology, and was inducted into the FSU Football Hall of Fame in 2005.

Following his retirement from professional football, McCorvey moved into player development and then coaching. He owned and operated the Titus Sports Academy in Tallahassee, Florida, from 2001 to 2009. He began his coaching career in 2009 as head coach at Maclay School in Tallahassee. He returned to the CFL in 2012 as the receivers coach for the Toronto Argonauts. In 2014-15 he was the receivers coach for Edmonton. In February 2016 McCorvey was named receivers coach at Middle Tennessee State University, joining the staff of another Florida State alumnus, Rick Stockstill.
