= Shane Bonham =

American football player (born 1970)

No. 96, 78, 72
- Position: Defensive tackle

Personal information
- Born: October 18, 1970 (age 56); Fairbanks, Alaska, U.S.
- Listed height: 6 ft 2 in (1.88 m)
- Listed weight: 272 lb (123 kg)

Career information
- High school: Fairbanks (AK) Lathrop
- College: Air Force; Tennessee
- NFL draft: 1994: 3rd round, 93rd overall pick

Career history
- Detroit Lions (1994–1997); San Francisco 49ers (1998–1999); Indianapolis Colts (1999)

Career NFL statistics
- Tackles: 53
- Sacks: 4
- Stats at Pro Football Reference

Steven Shane Bonham (born October 18, 1970) is an American former professional football player who was a defensive tackle in the National Football League (NFL). He was selected by the Detroit Lions in the third round of the 1994 NFL draft with the 93rd overall pick. In addition, he played for the Indianapolis Colts and San Francisco 49ers. He played college football for the Tennessee Volunteers.
