= Tony Semple =

American football player and coach (born 1970)

No. 62
- Position: Guard

Personal information
- Born: December 20, 1970 (age 55); Springfield, Illinois, U.S.
- Listed height: 6 ft 5 in (1.96 m)
- Listed weight: 286 lb (130 kg)

Career information
- High school: Lincoln
- College: Memphis
- NFL draft: 1994: 5th round, 154th overall pick

Career history

Playing
- Detroit Lions (1994–2003)

Coaching
- East Grand Rapids HS (MI); Offensive line coach (2012–2013); Hope; Offensive line coach (2016–2017)

Career NFL statistics
- Games played: 112
- Games started: 47
- Stats at Pro Football Reference

Anthony Lee Semple (born December 20, 1970) is an American former professional football player who was a guard for eight seasons with the Detroit Lions of the National Football League (NFL). He played college football for the Memphis Tigers and was selected in the fifth round of the 1994 NFL draft with the 154th overall pick.

He was the offensive line coach at Hope College in 2016 and 2017.
