= Kevin Glover =

American football player and administrator (born 1963)

Profile
- Positions: Center, guard

Personal information
- Born: June 17, 1963 (age 63); Largo, Maryland, U.S.
- Listed height: 6 ft 2 in (1.88 m)
- Listed weight: 278 lb (126 kg)

Career information
- High school: Largo
- College: Maryland
- NFL draft: 1985: 2nd round, 34th overall pick

Career history

Playing
- Detroit Lions (1985–1997); Seattle Seahawks (1998–1999)

Operations
- Maryland (2017–present) Director of player development

Awards and highlights
- Second-team All-Pro (1995); 3× Pro Bowl (1995–1997); Detroit Lions 75th Anniversary Team; Detroit Lions All-Time Team; First-team All-ACC (1984)

Career NFL statistics
- Games played: 191
- Games started: 175
- Fumble recoveries: 8
- Stats at Pro Football Reference

Kevin Bernard Glover (born June 17, 1963) is an American former professional football player who was a center for the Detroit Lions from 1985 to 1997 and the Seattle Seahawks from 1998 to 1999 of the National Football League (NFL). He played college football for the Maryland Terrapins. He is best known for his time with the Lions' blocking for Barry Sanders, who excelled as one of the greatest rushers in NFL history. During his professional career he was known as one of the best centers of the game.

== College career ==
Glover was a first-team All-American (The Sporting News) at Maryland in 1984 and a member of the Maryland Athletics Hall of Fame.

In 2009, Glover's contributions to college football were recognized when he was named to the ACC Football Championship Game Legends Class, honoring his impact on the sport during his collegiate career.

== Professional career ==
Almost selected by the New England Patriots, Glover was chosen six picks later with the 34th overall pick by the Lions in the second round of the 1985 NFL draft. He played thirteen years with the Lions, making the Pro Bowl three times.

== Later life ==
In 2017, Glover returned to his alma mater at the University of Maryland and became the director of player development. In December 2026 Glover will be inducted into the Michigan Sports Hall of Fame.
