= Dan Owens =

American football player (born 1967)

No. 70, 90, 93
- Position: Defensive end

Personal information
- Born: March 16, 1967 (age 59); Whittier, California, U.S.
- Listed height: 6 ft 3 in (1.91 m)
- Listed weight: 277 lb (126 kg)

Career information
- High school: La Habra (La Habra, California)
- College: Southern California
- NFL draft: 1990: 2nd round, 35th overall pick

Career history
- Detroit Lions (1990–1995); Atlanta Falcons (1996–1997); Detroit Lions (1998–1999)

Awards and highlights
- First-team All-Pac-10 (1988)

Career NFL statistics
- Tackles: 321
- Sacks: 33.5
- Fumble recoveries: 7
- Stats at Pro Football Reference

Daniel William Owens (born March 16, 1967) is an American former professional football player who was a defensive lineman in the National Football League (NFL). He was selected by the Detroit Lions in the second round of the 1990 NFL draft.

== Professional career ==
Owens played for the Detroit Lions and Atlanta Falcons between 1990 and 1999 and amassed 33 career sacks.

Dan played his first 6 season with the Lions. He signed as a free agent with Atlanta in 1996 and played 2 years with the Falcons. He returned to the Lions in 1998. In his first season back with the Lions, he started at defensive tackle. He got hurt in week 9 and was lost for the season. He rehabbed from a dislocated right knee that tore his ACL, PCL, LCL and meniscus cartilage to play in 1999.

== College career ==
Owens played college football at the University of Southern California where he was 1st team All-Pac-10 in 1988 and 1989. Started every game in college career (48). Helped USC win 3 PAC 10 championships. Played in 3 Rose Bowls 88,89,90 and the Citrus Bowl 87. Blocked a punt in the 1990 Rose Bowl game.
