= 1990 Detroit Lions season =

NFL team season

- Owner: William Clay Ford Sr.
- General manager: Chuck Schmidt
- Head coach: Wayne Fontes
- Offensive coordinator: Mouse Davis
- Defensive coordinator: Woody Widenhofer
- Home stadium: Pontiac Silverdome

Results
- Record: 6–10
- Division place: 3rd NFC Central
- Playoffs: Did not qualify
- Pro Bowlers: RB Barry Sanders; T Lomas Brown; DT Jerry Ball; LB Chris Spielman; PR Mel Gray

The 1990 Detroit Lions season was the franchise's 61st season in the National Football League (NFL), their 57th as the Detroit Lions, and their second under head coach Wayne Fontes. The team failed to improve upon their 7–9 record from the previous season, suffering their seventh consecutive losing season.

Despite dropping in yardage from his rookie season, Barry Sanders led the league in rushing yards with 1,304, being named to the Pro Bowl and the All-Pro Team while the Lions offense ranked 5th, scoring 373 points in the season. The defense dropped from 19th to 26th, allowing 5,734 yards of offense. Punt returner Mel Gray was named to the Pro Bowl and was named to the All-Pro Team, averaging 22 yards a return.

== Offseason ==
=== NFL draft ===
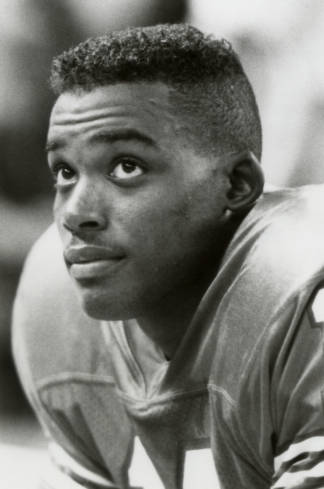
In the 1990 NFL draft, the Lions took Andre Ware seventh overall. He started six games over the next five years.

For the second season in a row, the Lions selected the Heisman Trophy winner with their draft picks, taking quarterback Andre Ware seventh-overall. With their second round pick, the Lions selected defensive end Dan Owens who would record 20.0 sacks with the team between 1990 to 1995 and 1998 to 1999. The Lions looked at defense again with their third round pick, selecting defensive Marc Spindler who recorded 9.0 sacks with the Lions. Their fourth round selection Rob Hinckley didn't make the roster. Their other fourth round selection, cornerback Chris Oldham, recorded one interception in his lone season with the Lions. With their fifth round selection, the Lions looked offense again, selecting Jeff Campbell who would record 495 yards and three touchdowns with the Lions.

1990 Detroit Lions draft
Round	Pick	Player	Position	College	Notes
1	7	Andre Ware	QB	Houston	
2	35	Dan Owens	DE	USC	
3	62	Marc Spindler	DE	Pittsburgh	
4	90	Rob Hinckley	LB	Stanford	
4	105	Chris Oldham	S	Oregon	Selection obtained from L.A. Rams in exchange for TE Pat Carter
5	118	Jeff Campbell	WR	Colorado	
6	147	Maurice Henry	LB	Kansas State	
7	174	Tracy Hayworth	LB	Tennessee	
8	194	Willie Green	WR	Mississippi	Selection obtained from Dallas in exchange for RB Paul Palmer
8	203	Roman Fortin	C	San Diego State	
9	229	Jack Linn	OT	West Virginia	
10	258	Bill Miller	WR	Illinois State	
11	285	Reginald Warnsley	RB	Southern Mississippi	
12	313	Robert Claiborne	WR	San Diego State	
Made roster

=== Free agency ===
Months before the draft, former first-round pick Chuck Long had requested a trade. The Lions had worked out a deal for the Colts to get Long contingent on them not being able to trade for the first overall pick to select Jeff George. However, the Colts were able to trade up and select George. Long was eventually traded to the Los Angeles Rams for a third-round draft selection. The Lions let Tony Paige go in free agency: he signed to the Miami Dolphins. The Lions also traded their 1989 second-round selection John Ford to the Seattle Seahawks, and allowed Stacey Mobley walk in free agency, who then signed with Green Bay Packers. Walter Stanley, who led the league in yards per return in the previous season, had high interest going into free agency and was ultimately signed by the Washington Redskins.

The Lions signed cornerback William Judson who, after requiring knee surgery and being placed on injured reserve, was waived in October.

=== Undrafted free agents ===
1990 undrafted free agents of note
Player	Position	College
Willie Burks	Defensive Tackle	Georgia Tech
Delmar Chesley	Linebacker	USC
Ken Dawson	Running back	Appalachian State
Jim Dubose	Linebacker	Wake Forest
Mike Farr	Wide receiver	UCLA
Troy Faunce	Punter	Kansas State
Eddie Grant	Center	Arizona State
Mark Hofland	Tackle	Maryland
Wilson Hoyle	Kicker	Wake Forest
Kip Lewis	Wide receiver	Arizona
George Linberger	Center/Guard	Toledo
Brent Napierkowski	Tackle	Portland State
M. J. Nelson	Wide receiver	Colorado
Mark Nua	Tackle	Hawaii
Scott Parker	Guard	West Virginia
Derrell Robertson	Defensive End	Mississippi State
Davis Smith	Wide receiver	Texas Southern
Eric Towe	Offensive Lineman	Eastern Michigan
Mike Williams	Linebacker	USC

== Personnel ==
=== Staff ===
1990 Detroit Lions staff
Front office: Owner and president – William Clay Ford Sr.; Executive vice president and chief operating officer – Chuck Schmidt; Treasurer – William Clay Ford Jr.; Director of player personnel – Ron Hughes; Director of pro scouting – Kevin Colbert; Head coaches: Head coach – Wayne Fontes; Off./def. administrative assistant to the head coach – Dave Levy; Offensive coaches: Quarterbacks and receivers – Mouse Davis; Quarterbacks and receivers – June Jones; Running backs – Billie Matthews; Receivers – Charlie Sanders; Offensive line – Jerry Wampfler	Defensive coaches: Defensive coordinator/outside linebackers – Woody Widenhofer; Defensive line – Lamar Leachman; Inside linebackers – Herb Paterra; Defensive backs – Len Fontes; Defensive assistant – Don Clemons; Special teams coaches: Special teams – Frank Gansz; Strength and conditioning: Strength and conditioning – Bert Hill

=== Roster ===
1990 Detroit Lions roster
Quarterbacks (QB): 14 Bob Gagliano; 9 Rodney Peete; 11 Andre Ware; Running backs (RB): 23 Mel Gray; 20 Barry Sanders; 34 James Wilder; Wide receivers (WR): 87 Jeff Campbell; 82 Robert Clark; 81 Mike Farr; 89 Terry Greer; 84 Richard Johnson; 83 Aubrey Matthews; 24 Jason Phillips; Tight ends (TE)	Offensive linemen (OL): 65 Eric Andolsek G; 75 Lomas Brown T; 67 Ken Dallafior G; 53 Kevin Glover C; 62 Dennis McKnight G; 73 Harvey Salem T; 64 Eric Sanders T; 60 Mike Utley G; Defensive linemen (DL): 93 Jerry Ball NT; 94 Jackie Cline DE; 91 Mark Duckens DE; 77 Keith Ferguson DE; 97 Jeff Hunter DE; 70 Dan Owens DE; 96 Lawrence Pete NT	Linebackers (LB): 52 Mark Brown OLB; 50 Toby Caston ILB; 55 Mike Cofer OLB; 99 Tracy Hayworth OLB; 58 George Jamison OLB; 57 Victor Jones ILB; 51 Niko Noga ILB; 54 Chris Spielman ILB; Defensive backs (DB): 32 Bruce Alexander CB; 36 Bennie Blades FS; 27 Darren Carrington CB; 39 Ray Crockett CB; 47 LeRoy Irvin CB; 42 Chris Oldham CB; 27 Herb Welch FS; 25 Sheldon White CB; 35 William White SS; Special teams (ST): 6 Jim Arnold P; 3 Eddie Murray K	Practice squad: 79 Donnie Gardner DE; Reserve: 48 Roman Fortin TE (IR); 98 Dennis Gibson LB (IR); 86 Willie Green WR (IR); 45 Rob Hinckley LB (IR); 29 Bruce McNorton CB (IR); 71 Derrell Robertson DE (IR); 92 Marc Spindler NT (IR); Rookies in italics 47 active, 7 reserve, 1 practice squad

== Preseason ==
The Lions began their preseason visiting the Houston Oilers. Using their starters in the first half, the Lions outgained the Oilers with 223 yards to 69. The Lions scored on their opening drive when sophomore Rodney Peete completed a pass to Richard Johnson for the 9-yard score. On the Oilers' first play, Warren Moon fumbled the ball which was recovered by the Lions on the 7-yard line. Barry Sanders scored on a 2-yard rush to give the Lions a 14–0 lead. A missed field goal by Lions' kicker Wilson Hoyle missed a 32-yard field goal. The Oilers scored their first points on an 80-yard drive. The Lions responded with a 23-yard interception return to take the 21–7 lead, which grew to 24–7 on a Hoyle 19-yard field goal. A punt return early in the second half and a 25-yard field goal put the Lions up 34–7. The Oilers tacked on a field goal to bring the final score to 34–10, with the Lions clinching their first preseason win since 1987.

Week	Date	Opponent	Result	Record	Venue
1	August 9	at Houston Oilers	W 34–10	1–0	Astrodome
2	August 17	Buffalo Bills	W 24–13	2–0	Pontiac Silverdome
3	August 24	Kansas City Chiefs	W 35–21	3–0	Pontiac Silverdome
4	August 31	at Cincinnati Bengals	W 26–24	4–0	Riverfront Stadium

== Regular season ==
=== Schedule ===
Week	Date	Opponent	Result	Record	Venue	Attendance
1	September 9	**Tampa Bay Buccaneers**	**L** 21–38	0–1	Pontiac Silverdome	56,692
2	September 16	Atlanta Falcons	**W** 21–14	1–1	Pontiac Silverdome	48,961
3	September 23	at **Tampa Bay Buccaneers**	**L** 20–23	1–2	Tampa Stadium	55,075
4	September 30	**Green Bay Packers**	**L** 21–24	1–3	Pontiac Silverdome	64,509
5	October 7	at **Minnesota Vikings**	**W** 34–27	2–3	Hubert H. Humphrey Metrodome	57,586
6	October 14	at Kansas City Chiefs	**L** 24–43	2–4	Arrowhead Stadium	74,312
7	Bye					
8	October 28	at New Orleans Saints	**W** 27–10	3–4	Louisiana Superdome	64,368
9	November 4	Washington Redskins	**L** 38–41 (OT)	3–5	Pontiac Silverdome	69,326
10	November 11	**Minnesota Vikings**	**L** 7–17	3–6	Pontiac Silverdome	68,264
11	November 18	at New York Giants	**L** 0–20	3–7	Giants Stadium	76,109
12	November 22	Denver Broncos	**W** 40–27	4–7	Pontiac Silverdome	73,896
13	December 2	at **Chicago Bears**	**L** 17–23 (OT)	4–8	Soldier Field	62,313
14	December 10	Los Angeles Raiders	**L** 31–38	4–9	Pontiac Silverdome	72,190
15	December 16	**Chicago Bears**	**W** 38–21	5–9	Pontiac Silverdome	67,759
16	December 22	at **Green Bay Packers**	**W** 24–17	6–9	Lambeau Field	46,700
17	December 30	at Seattle Seahawks	**L** 10–30	6–10	Kingdome	50,681
Note: Intra-divisional opponents are in **bold** text.

=== Game summaries ===
All game reports use the Pro Football Researchers' gamebook archive as a source.

==== Week 1: vs. Tampa Bay Buccaneers ====
Week 1: Tampa Bay Buccaneers vs. Detroit Lions – Game summary

Quarter	1	2	3	4	Total
**Buccaneers**	7	14	7	10	**38**
Lions	14	0	0	7	**21**

at Pontiac Silverdome, Michigan

- Date: September 9, 1990
- Game time: 1:00 p.m. EDT
- Game attendance: 54,728
- Referee: Tom White
- Box score

Game information

**First quarter**

- TAM – Ron Hall 54-yard pass from Vinny Testaverde (Steve Christie kick good), 12:45. Buccaneers 7–0 **Drive: 4 plays, 71 yards, 2:07.**
- DET – Robert Clark 26-yard pass from Rodney Peete (Eddie Murray kick good), 10:14. Tied 7–7 **Drive: 5 plays, 80 yards, 2:25.**
- DET – Barry Sanders 1-yard rush (Eddie Murray kick good), 1:13. Detroit 14–7 **Drive: 11 plays, 73 yards, 5:32.**

**Second quarter**

- TAM – Bruce Perkins 8-yard pass from Vinny Testaverde (Steve Christie kick good), 8:53. Tied 14–14 **Drive: 12 plays, 66 yards, 7:10.**
- TAM – Gary Anderson 19-yard pass from Vinny Testaverde (Steve Christie kick good), 6:16. Tampa Bay 21–14 **Drive: 3 plays, 28 yards, 1:53.**

**Third quarter**

- TAM – Reggie Cobb 2-yard rush (Steve Christie kick good), 10:31. Tampa Bay 28–14 **Drive: 7 plays, 38 yards, 3:28.**

**Fourth quarter**

- TAM – Steve Christie 22-yard field goal, 6:48. Tampa Bay 31–14 **Drive: 13 plays, 75 yards, 8:43.**
- DET – Robert Clark 16-yard pass from Bob Gagliano (Eddie Murray kick good), 5:34. Tampa Bay 31–21 **Drive: 4 plays, 76 yards, 1:04.**
- TAM – Wayne Haddix 62-yard interception return (Steve Christie kick good), 5:15. Tampa Bay 38–21

**Top passers**

- TAM – Vinny Testaverde – 16/21, 237 yards, 3 TD, INT
- DET – Rodney Peete – 10/21, 143 yards, TD, INT

**Top receivers**

- TAM – Gary Anderson – 6 receptions, 79 yards, TD
- DET – Robert Clark – 6 receptions, 117 yards, 2 TD

**Top rushers**

- TAM – Gary Anderson – 21 rushes, 74 yards
- DET – Barry Sanders – 14 rushes, 79 yards, TD

The Lions hosted the Tampa Bay Buccaneers in the season and home opener. The Buccaneers received the opening kickoff and took their first drive 4 plays and 71 yards into the endzone on a Vinny Testaverde 54-yard pass to Ron Hall. The Lions got the ball with a chance to respond on their own 20-yard line. After an incomplete pass, Rodney Peete completed a pass to Robert Clark four times in a row including the 15-yard touchdown pass to tie the game at 7–7. The Buccaneers took their next drive into Lions' territory when a Gary Anderson rush for 2 yards turned into a fumble that was recovered by the Lions. At their own 27, the Lions moved downfield with multiple 10+ yard passes and Barry Sanders rushes to cap off the scoring drive with a Sanders 1-yard rushing touchdown to put the Lions up 14–7. The Bucs' took their responding drive into the second quarter. Testaverde capped the drive off with a 8-yard pass into the end zone to tie the game 14–14. On the Lions next possession, an overthrown Peete pass intended for Clark fell into the hands of a Buccaneers defender. The Bucs took three plays to make it into the endzone with a Testaverde 19-yard pass to Anderson. The teams punted on each of their drives to end the first half.

The Lions received the second half kickoff, but fumbled it away on second down, turning it over. The Buccaneers quickly scored with aReggie Cobb 2-yard rushing touchdown to put the Buccaneers up 28–14. The Lions punted on their next drive, with the Buccaneers taking over on the Lions 47. The Bucs' got down to the Lions 25-yard line, but a Testaverde pass that went through the hands of Mark Carrier was intercepted which was returned 48-yard to the Bucs 32-yard line. The Lions moved the ball to the Bucs' 8-yard line. On 2nd and 7, Peete faked the handoff to Sanders and ran around to the right into the end zone for the 8-yard touchdown. However, upon review, the play was overturned. The Lions converted a 3rd and 1 on the 2 with a Sanders 1-yard rush. On 1st down from the 1, Peete fumbled the ball attempting a QB sneak which was turned over for a touchback. The Bucs took their new possession into the fourth quarter, settling for a 22-yard field goal by Steve Christie. On the Lions next drive, a 24-yard Sanders rush and a Bob Gagliano pass to Clark for 21 set up the 16-yard touchdown pass from Gagliano to Clark. The Lions attempted an onside kick, successfully recovering it with 5:28 left in the game. On the first play of their new drive, Gagliano threw an interception that was returned 62-yards for the touchdown. On the Lions first play after the turnover, the Lions turned the ball over again on a fumble. The Lions had one more drive to produce points, but a Gagliano interception leading to the two-minute warning sealed the 21–38 loss for the Lions.

==== Week 2: vs. Atlanta Falcons ====
Week 2: Atlanta Falcons at Detroit Lions – Game summary

Quarter	1	2	3	4	Total
Falcons	7	0	7	0	**14**
**Lions**	7	14	0	0	**21**

at Pontiac Silverdome, Michigan

- Date: September 16, 1990
- Game time: 1:00 p.m. EDT
- Game attendance: 48,961
- Referee: Gordon McCarter
- Box score

Game information

**First quarter**

- DET – Terry Greer 12-yard pass from Rodney Peete (Eddie Murray kick good), 5:06. Detroit 7–0 **Drive: 4 plays, 72 yards, 1:53.**
- ATL – Andre Rison 10-yard pass from Chris Miller (Greg Davis kick good), 0:33. Tied 7–7 **Drive: 4 plays, 73 yards, 1:48.**

**Second quarter**

- DET – Richard Johnson 5-yard pass from Rodney Peete (Eddie Murray kick good), 10:02. Detroit 14–7 **Drive: 10 plays, 67 yards, 5:19.**
- DET – Barry Sanders 17-yard rush (Eddie Murray kick good), 0:20. Detroit 21–7 **Drive: 5 plays, 36 yards, 0:54.**

**Third quarter**

- ATL – Steve Broussard 3-yard rush (Greg Davis kick good), 7:44. Detroit 21–14 **Drive: 12 plays, 63 yards, 7:08.**

**Top passers**

- ATL – Chris Miller – 18/31, 196 yards, TD
- DET – Rodney Peete – 13/26, 167 yards, 2 TD, 2 INT

**Top receivers**

- ATL – Michael Haynes – 1 receptions, 60 yards
- DET – Robert Clark – 4 receptions, 62 yards

**Top rushers**

- ATL – Gary Anderson – 21 rushes, 74 yards
- DET – Barry Sanders – 14 rushes, 79 yards, TD

In Week 2, the Lions hosted the Atlanta Falcons. The Lions received the opening kickoff. After a delay of game, Rodney Peete found Jason Phillips for 15 yards on 3rd and 16, electing to punt on the ensuing 4th and 1. On the Falcons' first drive, they got down to the 50-yard line on 3rd and 6, but were sacked and had to punt. On the first play of the Lions' new drive, Peete scrambled right and found Phillips for 29 yards. On the next play, Peete passed to Richard Johnson for a gain of 13 yards with an Atlanta 15-yard personal foul penalty bringing the Lions to the Falcons 15-yard line. A Barry Sanders rush brought them three before Peete found Terry Greer in the end zone to put the Lions up 7–0. After a three-and-out from both teams, the Falcons went from their own 27 to the Lions 13 with a Chris Miller 60-yard pass to Michael Haynes. After an incompletion and a three-yard rush, Miller found Andre Rison in the end zone on 3rd and 7 to tie it at 7–7. The Lions brought their responding scoring drive into the second quarter. They crossed midfield with a Peete pass to Robert Clark that went for 23-yards. They slowly inched down Falcons territory, converting a 3rd and 5 from the Falcons 13 with a Sanders 12-yard run that brought them to the goal-line. After Sanders was brought down 4 yards behind the line of scrimmage, Peete found Johnson in the end zone to go up 14–7. The teams exchanged punts along with a Peete intercepted followed up by an Atlanta punt. The Lions got possession with 1:14 left in the second half following a bad 24-yard punt that set them up at the Falcons 36. It took the Lions 54 seconds to reach the endzone with a Sanders 17-yard rushing touchdown to put the halftime score at 21–7.

The Falcons received the opening kickoff to start the second half. The Falcons, beginning at their own 37-yard line, moved into Lions territory with a Miller pass to Keith Jones for 11 yards. The Falcons got down to the Lions 3 on 2nd down and scored on a Steve Broussard 3-yard rushing touchdown to put the Falcons within 7 at 14–21. After two punts for each team, Peete threw an interception on 2nd and 20 to bring the Falcons' new drive into the fourth quarter. The Falcons looked poised to score when the team got down to the Lions 13-yard line. However, Miller fumbled the snap which was recovered by Detroit. After a total of four punts, the Lions drained the remaining clock with help from a Bob Gagliano 22-yard rush to bring up the final score of 21–14.

==== Week 3: at Tampa Bay Buccaneers ====
Week 3: Detroit Lions at Tampa Bay Buccaneers – Game summary

Quarter	1	2	3	4	Total
Lions	3	3	7	7	**20**
**Buccaneers**	0	6	3	14	**23**

at Tampa Stadium, Florida

- Date: September 23, 1990
- Game time: 8:02 p.m. EDT
- Game attendance: 55,075
- Referee: Dale Hamer
- Box score

Game information

**First quarter**

- DET – Eddie Murray 25-yard field goal, 3:39. Detroit 3–0 **Drive: 9 plays, 42 yards, 3:46.**

**Second quarter**

- TAM – Steve Christie 55-yard field goal, 13:03. Tied 3–3 **Drive: 10 plays, 34 yards, 5:36.**
- TAM – Steve Christie 28-yard field goal, 8:52. Tampa Bay 6–3 **Drive: 8 plays, 43 yards, 3:54.**
- DET – Eddie Murray 33-yard field goal, 3:31. Tied 6–6 **Drive: 13 plays, 63 yards, 5:21.**

**Third quarter**

- DET – Rodney Peete 1-yard rush (Eddie Murray kick good), 10:56. Detroit 13–6 **Drive: 8 plays, 64 yards, 4:04.**
- TAM – Steve Christie 21-yard field goal, 3:21. Detroit 13–9 **Drive: 14 plays, 61 yards, 7:35.**

**Fourth quarter**

- TAM – Gary Anderson 11-yard rush (Steve Christie kick good), 10:08. Tampa Bay 16–13 **Drive: 4 plays, 47 yards, 1:35.**
- DET – Robert Clark 5-yard pass from Rodney Peete (Eddie Murray kick good), 6:46. Detroit 20–16 **Drive: 6 plays, 48 yards, 3:22.**
- TAM – John Harvey 3-yard pass from Vinny Testaverde (Steve Christie kick good), 4:21. Tampa Bay 23–20 **Drive: 5 plays, 56 yards, 2:25.**

**Top passers**

- DET – Rodney Peete – 17/26, 169 yards, TD
- TAM – Vinny Testaverde – 13/22, 181 yards, TD

**Top rushers**

- DET – Rodney Peete – 8 rushes, 97 yards, TD
- TAM – Gary Anderson – 17 rushes, 71 yards, TD

**Top receivers**

- DET – Richard Johnson – 7 receptions, 73 yards
- TAM – Mark Carrier – 4 receptions, 65 yards

==== Week 12: vs. Denver Broncos ====
Week Twelve: Denver Broncos (3–7) at Detroit Lions (3–7)

Quarter	1	2	3	4	Total
Broncos	7	10	3	7	**27**
**Lions**	21	6	7	6	**40**

at Pontiac Silverdome, Pontiac, Michigan

- Date: November 22
- Game time: 12:30 p.m. EST
- Game weather: Indoors (dome)
- Game attendance: 73,896
- Referee: Dick Hantak
- Box Score

Game information

**First quarter**

- DET – Richard Johnson 11-yard pass from Bob Gagliano (Eddie Murray kick), 10:11. Lions 7–0. Drive:
- DEN – Melvin Bratton 1-yard run (David Treadwell kick), 6:45. Tie 7–7. Drive:
- DET – Barry Sanders 7-yard run (Eddie Murray kick), 4:32. Lions 14–7. Drive:
- DET – Richard Johnson 43-yard pass from Bob Gagliano (Eddie Murray kick), 0:50. Lions 21–7. Drive:

**Second quarter**

- DET – Eddie Murray 24-yard field goal, 1:32. Lions 24–7. Drive:
- DEN – David Treadwell 24-yard field goal, 8:40. Lions 24–10. Drive:
- DEN – Wymon Henderson 48-yard interception return (David Treadwell kick), 7:40. Lions 24–17.
- DET – Eddie Murray 32-yard field goal, 1:55. Lions 27–17. Drive:

**Third quarter**

- DEN – David Treadwell 32-yard field goal, 9:32. Lions 27–20. Drive:
- DET – Barry Sanders 35-yard pass from Bob Gagliano (Eddie Murray kick), 6:32. Lions 34–20. Drive:

**Fourth quarter**

- DEN – Melvin Bratton 1-yard run (David Treadwell kick), 14:14. Lions 34–27. Drive:
- DET – Eddie Murray 43-yard field goal, 3:43. Lions 37–27. Drive:
- DET – Eddie Murray 45-yard field goal, 2:51. Lions 40–27. Drive:

Top passers

- DEN – John Elway – 24/36, 246 yards, INT
- DET – Bob Gagliano – 18/30, 248 yards, 3 TD, INT

Top rushers

- DEN – Bobby Humphrey – 16 rushes, 53 yards
- DET – Barry Sanders – 23 rushes, 147 yards, TD

Top receivers

- DEN – Ricky Nattiel – 3 receptions, 50 yards
- DET – Richard Johnson – 5 receptions, 83 yards, 2 TD

=== Standings ===
NFC Central
	W	L	T	PCT	DIV	CONF	PF	PA	STK
^{(3)} Chicago Bears	11	5	0	.688	6–2	9–3	348	280	L1
Tampa Bay Buccaneers	6	10	0	.375	5–3	6–8	264	367	L2
Detroit Lions	6	10	0	.375	3–5	5–7	373	413	L1
Green Bay Packers	6	10	0	.375	3–5	5–7	271	347	L5
Minnesota Vikings	6	10	0	.375	3–5	4–8	351	326	L4

== Player stats ==
=== Rushing ===
Player	Attempts	Yards	Average	Long	Touchdowns
Barry Sanders	255	1304	5.1	45	13

=== Receiving ===
Player	Receptions	Yards	Average	Long	Touchdowns
Barry Sanders	36	480	13.3	47	3

== Awards and records ==
- Jerry Ball, Second-Team All-Pro selection
- Jerry Ball, Pro Bowl Reserve Selection
- Lomas Brown, Second-Team All-Pro selection
- Mike Cofer, Second-Team All-Pro selection
- Mel Gray, First-Team All-Pro selection
- Eddie Murray, Pro Bowl Selection
- Barry Sanders, First-Team All-Pro selection
- Barry Sanders, Pro Bowl Selection
- Chris Spielman, Pro Bowl Reserve Selection
