= 1989 Detroit Lions season =

NFL team season

- Owner: William Clay Ford Sr.
- General manager: Russ Thomas
- Head coach: Wayne Fontes
- Offensive coordinator: Mouse Davis
- Defensive coordinator: Woody Widenhofer
- Home stadium: Pontiac Silverdome

Results
- Record: 7–9
- Division place: 3rd NFC Central
- Playoffs: Did not qualify
- Pro Bowlers: RB Barry Sanders; LB Jerry Ball; LB Chris Spielman; K Eddie Murray

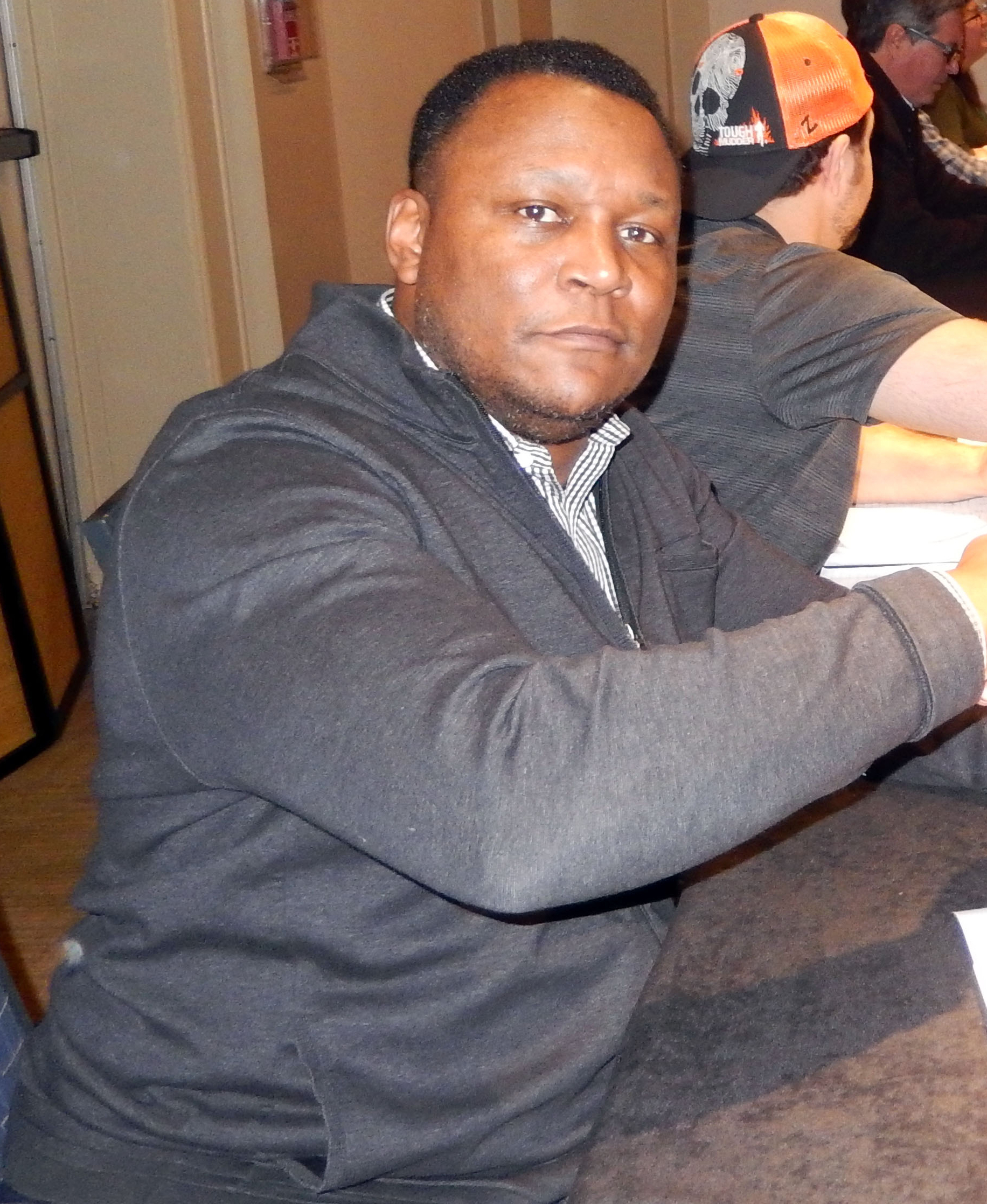
Barry Sanders was drafted third overall in the 1989 NFL draft.

The 1989 season was the Detroit Lions' 60th season in the National Football League (NFL), their 56th as the Detroit Lions, and their first full season under head coach Wayne Fontes. The team improved upon their 4–12 record from the previous season, falling to 2–9 before winning out to finish at 7–9. It was the Lions' sixth consecutive losing season, failing to reach the postseason for each of those seasons.

This was the first season with Heisman Trophy winner and future Pro Football Hall of Fame member Barry Sanders. Sanders would post 1,470 rushing yards and 14 touchdowns, winning the NFL Rookie of the Year award. In the passing game, Bob Gagliano and Rodney Peete split time as quarterback, starting eight and seven games respectively. Neither the offense nor defense were above average, with the offense moving 4,992 yards and the defensive allowing 5,537 yards; both ranked 19th in the league. Special teams were the only highlight of the Lions, with kicker Eddie Murray receiving his second and last Pro Bowl nod making 20 of 21 field goals and all 36 extra points, and punt returner Walter Stanley leading the league in yards per punt return with 13.8.

== Offseason ==
=== NFL draft ===
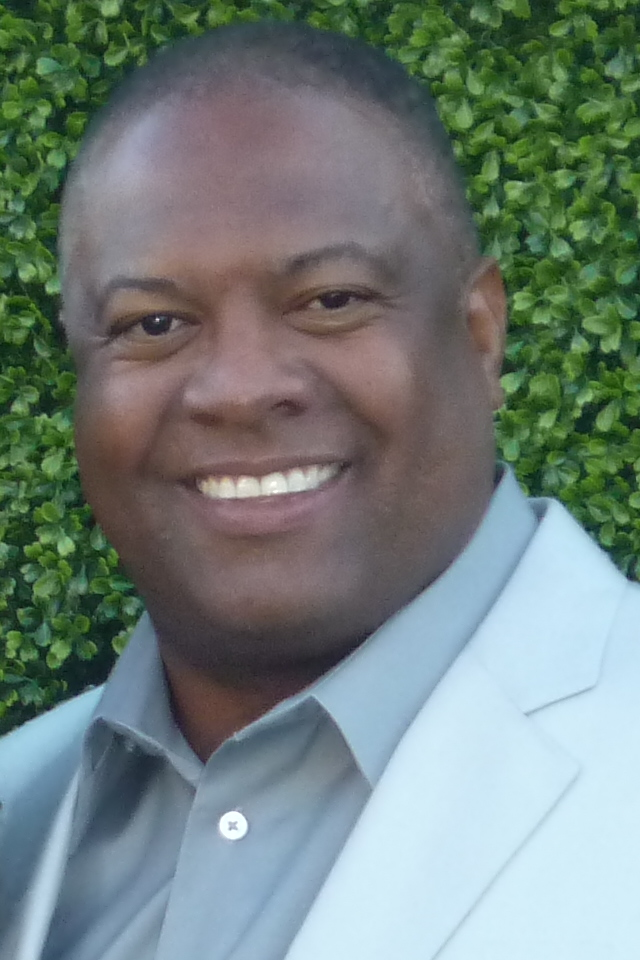
The Lions took quarterback Rodney Peete in the sixth round.

Barry Sanders, the Lions' ultimate first round selection, wouldn't have been eligible for the draft under normal circumstances. At the time of the 1989 draft, juniors in college were not allowed to declare for the draft. However, Sanders' college, Oklahoma State, were under investigation by the NCAA and were ultimately found in violation of the NCAA's recruiting rules. Thus, Oklahoma State were unable to appear on television and were ineligible for bowl games. Under these conditions, NFL Commissioner Pete Rozelle allowed Sanders to declare for the draft. The Lions selected Sanders with their third overall pick, the highest they took a running back since Billy Sims went first overall in 1980.

On offense, only two of the Lions' wide receiver selections, John Ford and Jason Phillips, recorded any statistics, not only for the Detroit Lions, but in their career. Phillips recorded 578 receiving yards and caught 2 touchdowns with most of his yards coming in his rookie campaign, and Ford played one game and recorded 58 receiving yards. The Lions also took quarterback Rodney Peete in the sixth round, who would go on to start several seasons for the Lions, including their 1991 season where he started 8 games before being sidelined with an injury. On defense, the only player who made any splash was cornerback Ray Crockett. Crockett would be awarded two Defensive Player of the Week awards with the Lions, and finished second in the league in interceptions in 1991.

1989 Detroit Lions draft
| Round | Pick | Player | Position | College | Notes |
| 1 | 3 | Barry Sanders * ^{†} | Running back | Oklahoma State | |
| 2 | 30 | John Ford | Wide receiver | Virginia | |
| 3 | 59 | Mike Utley | Guard | Washington State | |
| 4 | 86 | Ray Crockett | Cornerback | Baylor | |
| 5 | 115 | Lawrence Pete | Defensive tackle | Nebraska | |
| 6 | 141 | Rodney Peete | Quarterback | USC | |
| 7 | 170 | Jerry Woods | Defensive back | Northern Michigan | |
| 8 | 197 | Chris Parker | Defensive tackle | West Virginia | |
| 9 | 226 | Derek MacCready | Defensive end | Ohio State | |
| 10 | 253 | Jason Phillips | Wide receiver | Houston | |
| 11 | 282 | Keith Karpinski | Linebacker | Penn State | |
| 12 | 309 | James Cribbs | Defensive end | Memphis State | |
Made roster † Pro Football Hall of Fame * Made at least one Pro Bowl during career

=== Undrafted free agents ===
1989 undrafted free agents of note
| Player | Position | College |
|---|---|---|
| Bruce Alexander | Cornerback | Stephen F. Austin |
| James Dixon | Wide receiver | Houston |
| Mike McCray | Linebacker | Ohio State |
| John Miller | Safety | Michigan State |
| Mark Murphy | Defensive tackle | Boston College |
| Rick Sutkiewick | Kicker | Michigan |

=== Free agency ===
In a season deemed "Year of the Holdout", eight draft selections held out in search for more favorable contracts along with five defensive starters and two special teams players. Barry Sanders wasn't signed until September 8, two days before the Week 1 opener. In June, Sanders' father William said they would look for offers from the Canadian Football League if negotiations fell through. Rodney Peete, who was drafted in the 13th round of the 1989 MLB draft, had intentions to play baseball unless he received "a satisfactory offer" faxed from the Lions office. Peete would eventually sign a two-year deal with the Lions. Two-time All-Pro and Pro Bowler Jim Arnold, Pro Bowler Mike Cofer, full-time starters Dennis Gibson and Jerry Holmes, and veteran kicker Eddie Murray did not report to training camp on July 19. Jimmy Williams requested a trade and did not report to training camp. The Indianapolis Colts and the Seattle Seahawks expressed interest in Williams, with the Colts hosting a workout for him. The Lions were able to re-sign Murray, Arnold, and Cofer, with Williams reporting back to training camp. They also re-signed running back Tony Paige, signed Walter Stanley, and traded for Terry Taylor.

After substandard performances in his two first seasons, former seventh overall pick Reggie Rogers was waived by the Lions. Rogers had his 1988 season cut short after being involved in a car accident which killed three teenagers and broke multiple of Rogers' vertebrae. The Lions' reason for waiving Rogers would be due to the injuries he suffered.

== Personnel ==
=== Staff ===
1989 Detroit Lions staff
| Ownership: Owner and president – William Clay Ford Sr.; Front office: Executive vice president and general manager – Russ Thomas; Treasurer – William Clay Ford Jr.; Vice president for finance – Chuck Schmidt; Vice president for player personnel – Jerry Vainisi; Director of player personnel – Joe Bushofsky; Director of pro scouting – Ron Hughes; Head coaches: Head coach – Wayne Fontes; Offensive coaches: Offensive coordinator – Mouse Davis; Quarterbacks and receivers – June Jones; Running backs – Dave Levy; Tight ends – Charlie Sanders; Offensive line – Jerry Wampfler | Defensive coaches: Defensive coordinator/outside linebackers – Woody Widenhofer; Defensive line – Dick Modzelewski; Inside linebackers – Herb Paterra; Defensive backs – Billie Matthews; Administrative assistant – Don Clemons; Administrative assistant – Mike Murphy; Special teams coaches: Special teams – Frank Gansz |

=== Roster ===
1989 Detroit Lions roster
| Quarterbacks (QB): 14 Bob Gagliano; 16 Chuck Long; 9 Rodney Peete; Running backs (RB): 49 Tony Paige; 26 Carl Painter; 20 Barry Sanders; Wide receivers (WR): 82 Robert Clark; 80 John Ford; 23 Mel Gray; 84 Richard Johnson; 81 Stacey Mobley; 24 Jason Phillips; 87 Walter Stanley PR; 86 Mike Williams; Tight ends (TE) | Offensive linemen (OL): 65 Eric Andolsek G; 75 Lomas Brown T; 67 Ken Dallafior G; 70 Chris Gambol G; 53 Kevin Glover C; 61 Trevor Matich C; 74 Joe Milinichik G/T; 64 Eric Sanders T; Defensive linemen (DL): 93 Jerry Ball DT; 97 Kevin Brooks DE; 77 Keith Ferguson DE; 62 Curtis Green; 96 Lawrence Pete NT; 76 Eric Williams DE | Linebackers (LB): 95 Mark Brown OLB; 50 Toby Caston ILB; 55 Mike Cofer OLB; 98 Dennis Gibson ILB; 57 Victor Jones ILB; 90 Keith Karpinski OLB; 51 Niko Noga ILB; 54 Chris Spielman ILB; 59 Jimmy Williams OLB; Defensive backs (DB): 32 Bruce Alexander CB; 36 Bennie Blades S; 39 Ray Crockett CB; 34 James Griffin FS; 43 Jerry Holmes CB; 44 John Miller FS; 21 Terry Taylor CB; 35 William White SS; Special teams (ST): 6 Jim Arnold P; 3 Eddie Murray K | Reserve: 99 James Cribbs DE (IR); 58 George Jamison LB (IR); 89 Keith McDonald WR (IR); 29 Bruce McNorton CB (IR); 52 Steve Mott C (IR); 73 Harvey Salem T (IR); 60 Mike Utley G (IR); Rookies in italics 47 active, 7 reserve |

== Preseason ==
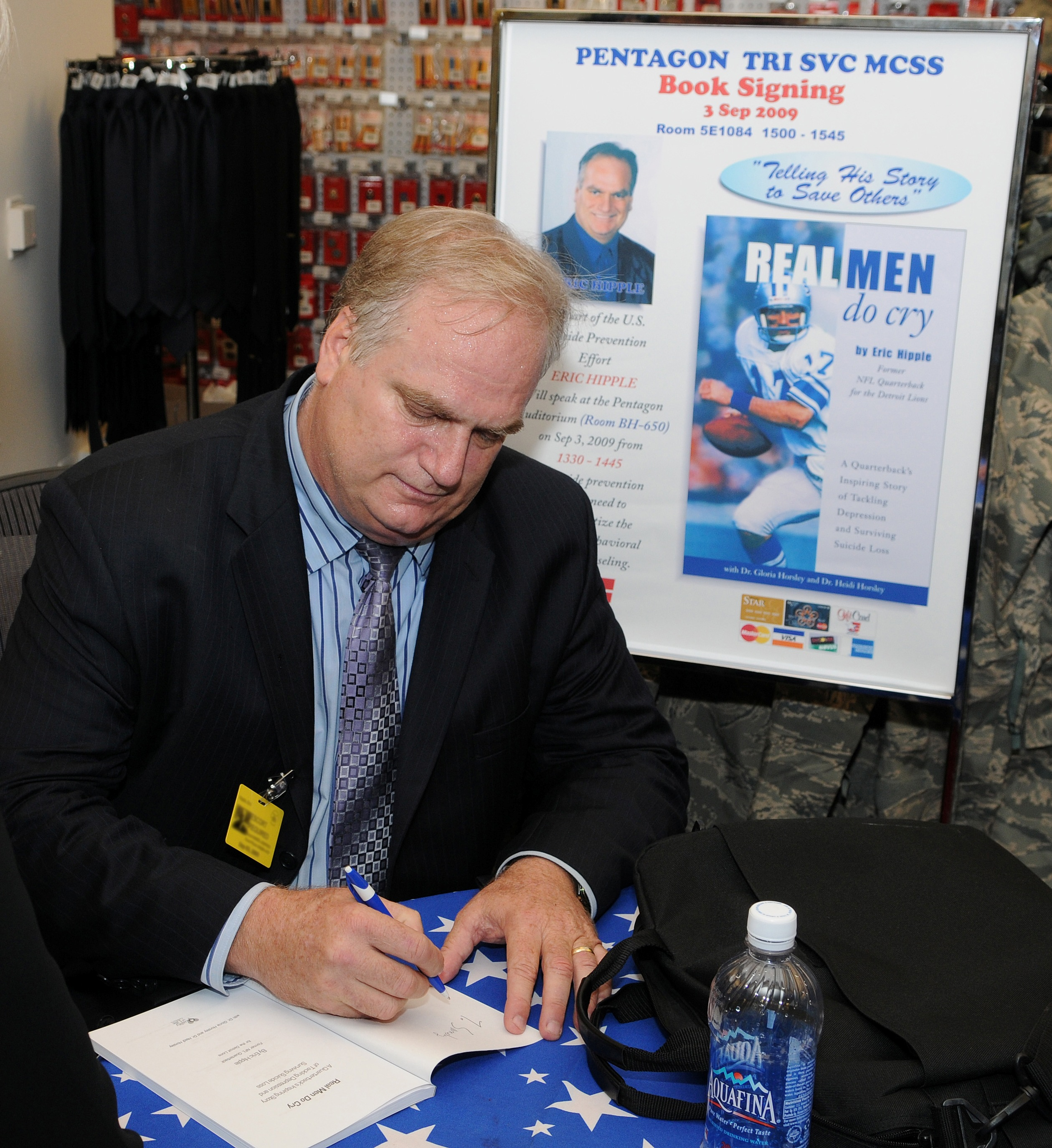
Eric Hipple threw four interceptions in the preseason game against the Cincinnati Bengals.

Beginning their preseason off hosting the Cleveland Browns, rookie quarterback Rodney Peete was slated to start the first half. He threw an interception that was brought back 73 yards for a touchdown. He also tacked on a passing touchdown before Bob Gagliano took over in the second half. The game was back-and-forth, with the Lions down 7–15, then going up 17–15, before eventually falling 24–25. In the second game against defending AFC champions Cincinnati Bengals, Fontes would start veteran Rusty Hilger and play Eric Hipple at quarterback, showing limited time to fan favorite Peete. At halftime, the score stood at 3–7, with Hilger having thrown three interceptions. In the second half, Hipple took over for Hilger. However, on just the first play of the second half, Hipple threw an interception which was brought back for a touchdown. The Lions let up 28 straight points en route to a 3–35 beating in which the Lions' quarterbacks threw 8 total interceptions.

In the third preseason game, the Lions traveled to Seattle to play the Seattle Seahawks. The Lions allowed Peete to start the first half and some of the third quarter, while handing the reins of the rest of the game off to Gagliano. The first half began much similarly to the game against the Bengals, with the Seahawks offense being held to 6 points and the score going into the half standing at 0–6 Lions. Late into the second quarter, a Jimmy Williams interception set the Lions at Seattle's 20-yard line. The Lions settled for a 36-yard attempt from Eddie Murray, but it was missed. The Lions wouldn't score until down 0–13 in the fourth quarter on a Carl Painter 1-yard rushing touchdown to settle the final score at 7–13. At risk of going 0–4 in the preseason for the second consecutive season, the Lions traveled to Los Angeles to face off against the Los Angeles Rams. With Peete opening the half, the Lions answered a Los Angeles touchdown by constructing a "unique drive". The Lions worked their way down with help from wide receiver Tony Paige, getting down to the Rams' 34-yard line. On the ensuing play, Peete completed a 13-yard pass to wide receiver Richard Johnson who fumbled it 11 yards upfield where it was picked up by Troy Johnson who carried it into the endzone to tie it at 7 apiece. However, the Lions stalled for the rest of the half, including an interception by Peete. On that same play, Peete went down with a knee injury and didn't return. The Rams dominated the rest of the game, allowing only one more touchdown by the Lions while scoring 2 of their own to win 24–14 and clinching the Lions' second consecutive 0–4 preseason record.

| Week | Date | Opponent | Result | Record | Venue |
|---|---|---|---|---|---|
| 1 | August 12 | Cleveland Browns | L 24–25 | 0–1 | Pontiac Silverdome |
| 2 | August 19 | Cincinnati Bengals | L 3–35 | 0–2 | Pontiac Silverdome |
| 3 | August 25 | at Seattle Seahawks | L 7–13 | 0–3 | Kingdome |
| 4 | September 2 | at Los Angeles Rams | L 14–24 | 0–4 | Anaheim Stadium |

== Regular season ==
=== Overview ===
The Lions started their regular season falling to 0–5. After their fifth consecutive loss, backup quarterback Chuck Long said starting multiple quarterbacks was "tearing the team apart". After losing the Week 11 matchup against the Cincinnati Bengals to fall to 2–9, the Lions rallied to win the last 5 games of the season to end with a 7–9 record, winning 5 in a row for the first time since 1970.

The Lions started three different quarterbacks in the season: Bob Gagliano, Eric Hipple, and Rodney Peete. Peete, a sixth-round pick who was the Heisman Trophy runner-up behind Barry Sanders in 1988, started eight games, missing eight due to injury. Gagliano was the Week 1 starter due to a knee injury Peete suffered in training camp, coming back in the Week 4 game against the Pittsburgh Steelers. When Peete went down with an injury in the Steelers game, he was ruled out for the Week 5 game against the Minnesota Vikings. Hipple, who led the Lions' last winning season, was slated to start the Week 5 matchup. Peete returned to start for weeks 6–11, but reinjured his knee during the Week 11 game against the Cincinnati Bengals. Peete was ruled out for one week before making his return against the New Orleans Saints, but again reinjured his left knee, keeping him out for the season. Gagliano threw for 1,671 yards, 6 touchdowns to 12 interceptions while Peete threw for 1,479 yards, 5 touchdowns to 9 interceptions. In his rookie campaign, Barry Sanders rushed for 1,470 yards, good for 2nd in the league, just 10 yards behind the league leader. Sanders also had 14 rushing touchdowns, also good for 2nd in the league.

Cornerback Jerry Holmes led the team in interceptions with 6, followed closely by Jimmy Williams with 5. Both Jerry Ball and Mike Cofer led the team with 9.0 sacks each, and Chris Spielman led the team in tackles with 125. Both Spielman and Ball earned Pro Bowl nods. On special teams, punter Jim Arnold was 2nd in the league for punting yardage with 3,538, earning the 3rd most yards per punt with 43.1. Kicker Eddie Murray led the league in field goal percentage with 95.2%, nearly 10% more than the 2nd best. Murray was named to the Pro Bowl for his efforts.

=== Schedule ===
| Week | Date | Opponent | Result | Record | Venue | Attendance |
|---|---|---|---|---|---|---|
| 1 | September 10 | Phoenix Cardinals | **L** 13–16 | 0–1 | Pontiac Silverdome | 36,735 |
| 2 | September 17 | at New York Giants | **L** 14–24 | 0–2 | Giants Stadium | 76,021 |
| 3 | September 24 | **Chicago Bears** | **L** 27–47 | 0–3 | Pontiac Silverdome | 71,418 |
| 4 | October 1 | Pittsburgh Steelers | **L** 3–23 | 0–4 | Pontiac Silverdome | 43,804 |
| 5 | October 8 | at **Minnesota Vikings** | **L** 17–24 | 0–5 | Hubert H. Humphrey Metrodome | 55,380 |
| 6 | October 15 | at **Tampa Bay Buccaneers** | **W** 17–16 | 1–5 | Tampa Stadium | 46,225 |
| 7 | October 22 | **Minnesota Vikings** | **L** 7–20 | 1–6 | Pontiac Silverdome | 51,579 |
| 8 | October 29 | at **Green Bay Packers** | **L** 20–23_{(OT)} | 1–7 | Milwaukee County Stadium | 53,731 |
| 9 | November 5 | at Houston Oilers | **L** 31–35 | 1–8 | Astrodome | 48,056 |
| 10 | November 12 | **Green Bay Packers** | **W** 31–22 | 2–8 | Pontiac Silverdome | 44,324 |
| 11 | November 19 | at Cincinnati Bengals | **L** 7–42 | 2–9 | Riverfront Stadium | 55,720 |
| 12 | November 23 | Cleveland Browns | **W** 13–10 | 3–9 | Pontiac Silverdome | 65,624 |
| 13 | December 3 | New Orleans Saints | **W** 21–14 | 4–9 | Pontiac Silverdome | 38,550 |
| 14 | December 10 | at **Chicago Bears** | **W** 27–17 | 5–9 | Soldier Field | 52,650 |
| 15 | December 17 | **Tampa Bay Buccaneers** | **W** 33–7 | 6–9 | Pontiac Silverdome | 40,362 |
| 16 | December 24 | at Atlanta Falcons | **W** 31–24 | 7–9 | Atlanta–Fulton County Stadium | 7,792 |
| Note: Intra-divisional opponents are in **bold** text. | | | | | | |

=== Game summaries ===
All game reports use the Pro Football Researchers' gamebook archive as a source.

==== Week 1: vs. Phoenix Cardinals ====
Week 1: Phoenix Cardinals at Detroit Lions – Game summary

| Quarter | 1 | 2 | 3 | 4 | Total |
|---|---|---|---|---|---|
| **Cardinals** | 0 | 6 | 0 | 10 | **16** |
| Lions | 3 | 0 | 7 | 3 | **13** |

at Pontiac Silverdome, Detroit, Michigan

- Date: September 10, 1989
- Game time: 1:00 p.m. EDT/11:00 p.m. MDT
- Game attendance: 36,735
- Box score

Game information

**First quarter**

- DET – Eddie Murray 30-yard field goal, 6:57. Detroit 3–0 **Drive: 13 plays, 65 yards.**

**Second quarter**

- PHX – Al Del Greco 29-yard field goal, 5:45. Tied 3–3 **Drive: 13 plays, 67 yards.**
- PHX – Al Del Greco 23-yard field goal, 0:36. Phoenix 6–3 **Drive: 9 plays, 52 yards.**

**Third quarter**

- DET – Barry Sanders 3-yard rush (Eddie Murray kick good), 3:01. Detroit 10–6 **Drive: 10 plays, 90 yards.**

**Fourth quarter**

- PHX – Roy Green 15-yard pass from Gary Hogeboom (Al Del Greco kick good), 12:33. Phoenix 13–10 **Drive: 11 plays, 88 yards.**
- DET – Eddie Murray 23-yard field goal, 8:12. Tied 13–13 **Drive: 8 plays, 60 yards.**
- PHX – Al Del Greco 33-yard field goal, 0:13. Phoenix 16–13 **Drive: 6 plays, 39 yards.**

**Top passers**

- PHX – Gary Hogeboom – 21/35, 264 yards, TD, INT
- DET – Bob Gagliano – 7/20, 116 yards

**Top receivers**

- PHX – J.T. Smith – 10 receptions, 121 yards
- DET – Stacey Mobley – 2 receptions, 44 yards

**Top rushers**

- PHX – Stump Mitchell – 18 rushes, 52 yards
- DET – Barry Sanders – 9 rushes, 71 yards, TD

Receiving the kickoff at the home and season opener, the Lions' instantly marched down the field to score on an Eddie Murray 30-yard field goal to bring the score to 3–0. The first quarter ended without any more scoring, but the Lions dominated the time of possession by holding the ball for 11:09. After a Lions punt, the Cardinals began their third drive of the game. They moved into Lions territory and settled for a Al Del Greco 29-yard field goal to tie it at 3–3. The Lions went three-and-out and punted. Starting with good field position, the Cardinals punted. However, a 15-yard penalty gave the Cardinals a first down. With a second chance, the Cardinals kicked a 23-yard field goal to settle the score at 3–6 going into halftime.

Beginning the second half with possession, the Cardinals punted after pushing into Detroit territory. Starting their drive, the Lions converted on a 3rd and 17 screen pass from Gagliano to Mel Gray which went for 30 yards. After an incompletion, Barry Sanders came into the game. A 27-yard pass interference penalty put the Lions at the Cardinals 29-yard line. Handed the ball on his first carry as an NFL player, Sanders ran up the middle for an 18-yard gain. Sanders was given the ball three more times, punching in the last one for a 3-yard touchdown. The Cardinals responded immediately with an 11-play, 88-yard touchdown drive to put the score at 13–10 with 12:33 left in the fourth. The Lions responded with a quick 8 play drive that ended with a Murray 23-yard field goal. This field goal was Murray's 13th straight, a franchise record. The Lions got the ball back after a William White interception, but punted it away. The teams traded punts when the Cardinals began their drive with 2:45 left in the fourth. A 15-yard and 22-yard completion set the Cardinals up at the Lions' 16-yard line. On first down, with 0:13 left, the Cardinals kicked a 33-yard field goal to put them up 16–13. With only 13 seconds to respond, the Lions' received the kickoff. Rookie Jerry Woods brought the kickoff out from the 8-yard line, but fumbled on the 21-yard line when hit, turning the ball over and ending the game, dropping the Lions to 0–1.

==== Week 2: at New York Giants ====
Week 2: Detroit Lions at New York Giants – Game summary

| Quarter | 1 | 2 | 3 | 4 | Total |
|---|---|---|---|---|---|
| Lions | 0 | 7 | 7 | 0 | **14** |
| **Giants** | 3 | 0 | 14 | 7 | **24** |

at Giants Stadium, East Rutherford, New Jersey

- Date: September 17, 1989
- Game time: 4:00 p.m. EDT
- Game attendance: 76,021
- Box score

Game information

**First quarter**

- NYG – Raul Allegre 49-yard field goal, 6:46. New York 3–0 **Drive: 12 plays, 39 yards, 5:49.**

**Second quarter**

- DET – Richard Johnson 71-yard pass from Bob Gagliano (Eddie Murray kick good), 8:03. Detroit 7–3 **Drive: 3 plays, 80 yards, 1:40.**

**Third quarter**

- DET – Barry Sanders 4-yard rush (Eddie Murray kick good), 9:55. Detroit 14–3 **Drive: 7 plays, 74 yards, 3:57.**
- NYG – Ottis Anderson 11-yard rush (Raul Allegre kick good), 5:10. Detroit 14–10 **Drive: 8 plays, 64 yards, 4:45.**
- NYG – Odessa Turner 9-yard pass from Phil Simms (Raul Allegre kick good), 0:43. New York 17–14 **Drive: 7 plays, 55 yards, 3:19.**

**Fourth quarter**

- NYG – Mark Bavaro 24-yard pass from Phil Simms (Raul Allegre kick good), 9:42. New York 24–14 **Drive: 3 plays, 37 yards, 0:58.**

**Top passers**

- DET – Bob Gagliano – 21/31, 344 yards, TD, 3 INT
- NYG – Phil Simms – 20/26, 218 yards, 2 TD

**Top receivers**

- DET – Richard Johnson – 9 receptions, 172 yards, TD
- NYG – Odessa Turner – 5 receptions, 67 yards, TD

**Top rushers**

- DET – Barry Sanders – 12 rushes, 57 yards, TD
- NYG – Ottis Anderson – 25 rushes, 85 yards, TD

In Week 2, the Lions visited the New York Giants. The Lions received the ball to start the game, but punted. On their first drive, the Giants converted two third downs which set up the 49-yard field goal that Raul Allegre completed to put the Lions down 0–3. With a chance to respond, a Bob Gagliano 12-yard rush brought the Lions into Giants territory, however they would have to punt. After trading punts, the Lions began their drive on their own 20-yard line. On 2nd and 16, Gagliano completed a pass to Richard Johnson which he brought 71-yards for a touchdown, putting the Lions up 7–3. Looking to respond, the Giants marched down the field and reached the Lions' 1-yard line. Running back Ottis Anderson rushed up the middle, but fumbled the ball into the endzone which was recovered by the Lions for a touchback. With the clock winding down in the second quarter, the Lions drove down the field to reach the Giants' 10-yard line with 0:47 left in the half. Sanders ran up the middle for 2 yards, but fumbled it back to the Giants, ending the half with the Lions up 7–3.

To begin the second half, the Lions' defense forced a three-and-out on the Giants' first drive. On their first offensive play, Gagliano connected with his receivers for an 18 and 26-yard gain. They capped off the drive with a Barry Sanders 4-yard run for a touchdown, extending the Lions' lead to 14–3. Responding, the Giants constructed a quick drive that ended with an Anderson touchdown to bring the Giants at 10–14. Both the Lions offense and defense stalled, allowing the Giants to score on a 9-yard pass to put the Lions down 14–17. On the second play of the Lions' next drive, Gagliano's pass was intercepted and brought back to the Detroit 35-yard line, however the Giants couldn't score, punting on the Lions' 34. The Lions started their drive on their own 5-yard line and quickly moved to their own 44-yard line, however on second down, Gagliano was strip sacked. The Giants instantly capitalized, scoring in three plays to extend their lead to 24–14. This would stay the final score as a Gagliano interception sealed the game for the Giants, dropping the Lions to 0–2.

==== Week 3: vs. Chicago Bears ====
Week 3: Chicago Bears at Detroit Lions – Game summary

| Quarter | 1 | 2 | 3 | 4 | Total |
|---|---|---|---|---|---|
| **Bears** | 10 | 10 | 13 | 14 | **47** |
| Lions | 0 | 13 | 7 | 7 | **27** |

at Pontiac Silverdome, Detroit, Michigan

- Date: September 24, 1989
- Game time: 1:00 p.m. EDT
- Game attendance: 71,418
- Box score

Game information

**First quarter**

- CHI – Kevin Butler 21-yard field goal, 7:44. Chicago 3–0 **Drive: 12 plays, 60 yards.**
- CHI – Brad Muster 6-yard rush (Kevin Butler kick good), 1:13. Chicago 10–0 **Drive: 9 plays, 78 yards.**

**Second quarter**

- DET – Barry Sanders 3-yard rush (Eddie Murray kick good), 10:52. Chicago 10–7 **Drive: 9 plays, 73 yards.**
- CHI – Dennis McKinnon 40-yard pass from Mike Tomczak (Kevin Butler kick good), 9:13. Chicago 17–7 **Drive: 3 plays, 78 yards.**
- DET – Eddie Murray 40-yard field goal, 6:27. Chicago 17–10 **Drive: 8 plays, 46 yards.**
- CHI – Kevin Butler 22-yard field goal, 1:58. Chicago 20–10 **Drive: 9 plays, 76 yards.**
- DET – Eddie Murray 48-yard field goal, 0:27. Chicago 20–13 **Drive: 7 plays, 31 yards.**

**Third quarter**

- CHI – Neal Anderson 53-yard rush (Kevin Butler kick good), 12:31. Chicago 27–13 **Drive: 4 plays, 70 yards.**
- DET – Bob Gagliano 1-yard rush (Eddie Murray kick good), 10:01. Chicago 27–20 **Drive: 5 plays, 53 yards.**
- CHI – Kevin Butler 25-yard field goal, 4:15. Chicago 30–20 **Drive: 8 plays, 72 yards.**
- CHI – Kevin Butler 32-yard field goal, 0:54. Chicago 33–20 **Drive: 5 plays, 19 yards.**

**Fourth quarter**

- CHI – Brad Muster 3-yard pass from Mike Tomczak (Kevin Butler kick good), 6:00. Chicago 40–20 **Drive: 3 plays, 10 yards**
- CHI – Jim Harbaugh 1-yard rush (Kevin Butler kick good), 3:46. Chicago 47–20 **Drive: 3 plays, 42 yards.**
- DET – Bob Gagliano 1-yard rush (Eddie Murray kick good), 1:59. Chicago 47–27 **Drive: 4 plays, 35 yards.**

**Top passers**

- CHI – Mike Tomczak – 17/25, 302 yards, 2 TD
- DET – Bob Gagliano – 9/19, 126 yards, 3 INT

**Top receivers**

- CHI – Dennis McKinnon – 3 receptions, 62 yards, TD
- DET – Richard Johnson – 4 receptions, 62 yards

**Top rushers**

- CHI – Neal Anderson – 16 rushes, 116 yards, TD
- DET – Barry Sanders – 18 rushes, 126 yards, TD

In Week 3, the Lions hosted their division rival Chicago Bears. Receiving the ball on the opening kickoff, Bob Gagliano completed a 25-yard pass to Robert Clark who fumbled it, being recovered by the Bears who brought it back to the Bears 36. The Bears converted two third downs to convert a field goal to take the early 3–0 lead. The Lions couldn't muster a yard, and punted after three plays. The Bears extended their lead with a Brad Muster rushing touchdown gave the Bears a 10–0 lead. After gaining possession going into the second quarter, Barry Sanders sped to the endzone to put the Lions within 3 at 7–10. The Bears quickly responded with a 43-yard pass and a 40-yard touchdown pass that extended the Chicago lead to 17–7. The Lions offense responded with an Eddie Murray field goal to again put them within a score at 10–17. However, that lead would again be erased after a Bears drive started with a 55-yard pass and ended with a field goal to keep the lead 20–10. A Mel Gray 33-yard return got the Lions at their 38. Two Sanders' first downs for a 48-yard field goal which Murray drilled to extend his streak to 15 straight field goals. Time on the clock expired with the Bears up 20–13 going into halftime.

The Bears received the second half kickoff and wasted no time scoring with a 53-yard rushing touchdown. After a return that netted the Lions 38 yards after penalties to start at their own 47. After a pass interference call set the Lions at the Bears' 1-yard line, Gagliano rushed into the endzone after faking it to Sanders with the score at 20–27. The Bears kept on producing big plays, with a 43-yard pass setting up the 25-yard field goal. On their next drive, Gagliano attempted to get the ball to Clark but was intercepted by Lorenzo Lynch. The Bears settled for a 32-yard field goal to bring the Bears lead to 33–20. The Lions took their next drive into the fourth quarter, where an errant pass by Gagliano was intercepted at the Bears 15-yard line. The Lions defense forced the first punt by the Bears offense 51 minutes into the game. Gagliano once again turned the ball over on an interception that was nearly returned for a touchdown. The Bears quickly scored to go up 40–20. The Lions received the ball with 5:47 left to play. On the first play of their new drive, Gagliano completed a pass to Walter Stanley for 14 yards, but Stanley fumbled the ball which was recovered by the Bears. Due to the blowout, Jim Harbaugh came in to replace Mike Tomczak, who ran it in for a touchdown to mount the Bears lead to 47–27. A 62-yard kickoff return by Paul Palmer got the Lions on the Bears 35-yard line where they would eventually score, bringing the final score to 47–27 in favor of the Bears, dropping the Lions to 0–3.

==== Week 4: vs. Pittsburgh Steelers ====
Week 4: Pittsburgh Steelers at Detroit Lions – Game summary

| Quarter | 1 | 2 | 3 | 4 | Total |
|---|---|---|---|---|---|
| **Steelers** | 0 | 10 | 7 | 6 | **23** |
| Lions | 3 | 0 | 0 | 0 | **3** |

at Pontiac Silverdome, Detroit, Michigan

- Date: October 1, 1989
- Game time: 1:00 p.m. EDT
- Box score

Game information

**First quarter**

- DET – Eddie Murray 37-yard field goal, 9:46. Detroit 3–0 **Drive: 8 plays, 56 yards.**

**Second quarter**

- PIT – Louis Lipps 48-yard pass from Bubby Brister (Gary Anderson kick good), 2:15. Pittsburgh 7–3 **Drive: 10 plays, 90 yards.**
- PIT – Gary Anderson 20-yard field goal, 0:23. Pittsburgh 10–3 **Drive: 8 plays, 52 yards.**

**Third quarter**

- PIT – Rodney Carter 1-yard rush (Gary Anderson kick good), 2:52. Pittsburgh 17–3 **Drive: 8 plays, 40 yards.**

**Fourth quarter**

- PIT – Ray Wallace 2-yard rush (Bubby Brister pass failed), 8:30. Pittsburgh 23–3 **Drive: 6 plays, 38 yards.**

**Top passers**

- PIT – Bubby Brister – 21/27, 267 yards, TD
- DET – Rodney Peete – 15/30, 160 yards, INT

**Top receivers**

- PIT – Louis Lipps – 7 receptions, 126 yards, TD
- DET – Robert Clark – 6 receptions, 124 yards

**Top rushers**

- PIT – Warren Williams – 12 rushes, 47 yards
- DET – Richard Johnson – 5 rushes, 22 yards

In Week 4, the Lions hosted the Pittsburgh Steelers. This was the first start for rookie quarterback Rodney Peete. The Lions received the ball on the opening kickoff, but punted it away after not gaining a first down. The Steelers did the same, punting after going three-and-out. The Lions second drive started with a pass interference on Pittsburgh that set them up at their own 49. The drive would with Eddie Murray bringing the score to 3–0 on a 37-yard field goal, his 16th in a row. Both teams traded multiple punts before the Peete completed a pass to Clark that went for 46 yards, bringing them well into Pittsburgh territory at the 19-yard line. A pass interference penalty in the endzone set the Lions up at the 1-yard line. Peete handed it off to Barry Sanders, who lost one yard and proceeded to fumble it to the Steelers. The Steelers, starting on their own two-yard line, quickly got out with passes of 19, 24 and 48 yards pass, the final being completed for a touchdown. On their responding drive, Peete completed a pass to Richard Johnson for 8 yards but he fumbled it over to the Steelers. The Steelers quickly got into Detroit territory on a 31-yard pass to set up the 20-yard field goal, which Gary Anderson drilled to put the Steelers up 10–3 going into halftime.

Starting the half with the ball, the Steelers punted it after going three-and-out. The two teams traded punts until an errant Peete pass was intercepted and returned to their 40-yard line. With new hope, Warren Williams punched it in for the 17–3 lead. Trading punts again, the Lions began their drive after bringing in Bob Gagliano to replace Peete. Gagliano targeted Walter Stanley on a pass that was intercepted by Dwayne Woodruff. Now at the Lions 38, the Steelers scored on a 2-yard rushing touchdown by Ray Wallace. A subsequent 2-point conversion failed, bringing the score to 23–3 in favor of the Steelers, which would be the final score.

==== Week 5: at Minnesota Vikings ====
Week 5: Detroit Lions at Minnesota Vikings – Game summary

| Quarter | 1 | 2 | 3 | 4 | Total |
|---|---|---|---|---|---|
| Lions | 7 | 3 | 0 | 7 | **17** |
| **Vikings** | 0 | 24 | 0 | 0 | **24** |

at Metrodome, Minnesota

- Date: October 8, 1989
- Game time: 1:00 p.m. EDT
- TV announcers (CBS): Tim Ryan and Randy Cross
- Box score

Game information

**First quarter**

- DET – Eric Hipple 1-yard rush (Eddie Murray) kick good, 1:40. Detroit 7–0 **Drive: 4 plays, 31 yards, 1:40.**

**Second quarter**

- MIN – Rich Karlis 22-yard field goal, 12:45. Detroit 7–3 **Drive: 8 plays, 63 yards, 4:38.**
- MIN – Mike Merriweather 15–yard interception return (Rich Karlis kick good), 11:42. Minnesota 10–7.
- MIN – Issiac Holt 90-yard interception return (Rich Karlis kick good), 5:19. Minnesota 17–7.
- MIN – Brent Novoselsky 2-yard pass from Tommy Kramer (Rich Karlis kick good), 0:54. Minnesota 24–7 **Drive: 13 plays, 73 yards, 4:25.**
- DET – Eddie Murray 50-yard field goal, 0:54. Minnesota 24–10 **Drive: 6 plays, 32 yards, 0:54.**

**Third quarter** No scoring plays **Fourth quarter**

- DET – Bob Gagliano 1-yard rush (Eddie Murray kick good), 4:25. Minnesota 24–17 **Drive: 19 plays, 80 yards, 7:12.**

**Top passers**

- DET – Eric Hipple – 7/18, 90 yards, 3 INT
- MIN – Tommy Kramer – 11/18, 146 yards, TD

**Top receivers**

- DET – Richard Johnson – 3 receptions, 38 yards
- MIN – Hassan Jones – 2 receptions, 44 yards

**Top rushers**

- DET – Barry Sanders – 23 attempts, 99 yards
- MIN – Rick Fenney – 9 attempts, 35 yards

In Week 5, the Lions traveled to Minnesota to face off against division rival Minnesota Vikings. Having the opportunity to receive the game opening kickoff for the fifth time in as many games, the Lions were forced to a three-and-out. But they got the ball right back when fullback Rick Fenney fumbled on 3rd down. However, they failed to gain a yard and punted. Three straight punts put the Lions on Minnesota's 31. A 30-yard pass from Eric Hipple to Stacey Mobley set them up at Minnesota's 1-yard line where Hipple ran it in for the score to put the Lions up 7–0. With a chance to respond, Tommy Kramer moved the ball down the field into the second quarter to set up a 22-yard field goal by Rich Karlis to put the Vikings on the board down 3–7. Starting at their own 5-yard line, an errant Hipple pass fell into the hands of Vikings linebacker Mike Merriweather who brought it to the endzone to put the Lions down 7–10. Looking to make up for the mistake, Hipple completed a 30-yard pass to Barry Sanders which brought the Lions to the Minnesota's 15. Looking for the endzone, Hipple quickly shot a pass intended for Walter Stanley, but Issiac Holt ran in front of the pass and intercepted it, bringing it back 90-yards for the second pick-six to bring the Vikings lead to 17–7. After a three-and-out from the Lions, the Vikings orchestrated a 13 play drive which ended on a Kramer pass to Brent Novoselsky to extend their lead to 24–7. The Lions got one more drive in the half to earn some points. With five seconds left in the half, Eddie Murray kicked a 50-yard field goal to bring the score to 24–10 and his kicking streak to 17 consecutive.

The second half began with four straight punts. On the fourth punt return, Vikings' returner Leo Lewis fumbled the ball and turned it over to the Lions in Minnesota territory. On the Vikings' 13-yard line, Hipple threw his third interception. The Vikings settled for a 29-yard field goal by Karlis, which missed wide right. The Lions took their next drive 80 yards in 19 plays capped off by a Bob Gagliano 1-yard rush. On the succeeding Vikings drive, D. J. Dozier fumbled the ball on their own 40-yard line, setting the Lions up with prime opportunity to tie the game. Three consecutive sacks, including on fourth down where Hipple fumbled to seal the Lions 17–24 loss .

==== Week 6: at Tampa Bay Buccaneers ====
Week 6: Detroit Lions at Tampa Bay Buccaneers – Game summary

| Quarter | 1 | 2 | 3 | 4 | Total |
|---|---|---|---|---|---|
| **Lions** | 3 | 0 | 7 | 7 | **17** |
| Buccaneers | 0 | 10 | 3 | 3 | **16** |

at Tampa Stadium, Florida

- Date: October 15, 1989
- Game time: 1:00 p.m. EDT
- Game attendance: 46,225
- Box score

Game information

**First quarter**

- DET – Eddie Murray 28-yard field goal, 10:28. Detroit 3–0 **Drive: 6 plays, 27 yards, 2:20.**

**Second quarter**

- TAM – Ricky Reynolds 68-yard interception return (Donald Igwebuike kick good), 12:23. Tampa Bay 7–3
- TAM – Donald Igwebuike 27-yard field goal, 3:28. Tampa Bay 10–3 **Drive: 13 plays, 54 yards, 6:40.**

**Third quarter**

- DET – Robert Clark 33-yard pass from Rodney Peete (Eddie Murray kick), 7:56. Tied 10–10 **Drive: 12 plays, 80 yards, 7:04.**
- TAM – Donald Igwebuike 34-yard field goal, 5:05. Tampa Bay 13–10 **Drive: 7 plays, 29 yards, 1:27.**

**Fourth quarter**

- TAM – Donald Igwebuike 33-yard field goal, 1:45. Tampa Bay 16–10 **Drive: 14 plays, 66 yards, 7:42.**
- DET – Rodney Peete 5-yard rush (Eddie Murray kick good),

0:23. Detroit 17–16 **Drive: 8 plays, 81 yards, 1:22.**

**Top passers**

- DET – Rodney Peete – 17/31, 268 yards, TD, 2 INT
- TAM – Joe Ferguson – 16/29, 128 yards, INT

**Top receivers**

- DET – Robert Clark – 4 receptions, 97 yards, TD
- TAM – Bruce Hill – 6 receptions, 49 yards

**Top rushers**

- DET – Rodney Peete – 10 attempts, 78 yards, TD
- TAM – Lars Tate – 20 attempts, 45 yards

In Week 6, the Lions visited the Tampa Bay Buccaneers. On the Buccaneers first drive, Joe Ferguson was intercepted at their own 47-yard line which was returned to the 38-yard line. The Lions converted one first down and settled for an Eddie Murray 28-yard field goal, extending his streak to 18. The Lions defense stepped up again to force a three-and-out. Getting the ball at their own 44, Peete threw an interception. The Buccaneers couldn't capitalize as the teams traded punts. Having moved the ball from their own 16 to the Buccaneers 43, Peete threw another interception which was brought back for a touchdown to put the Lions down 3–7. The Lions failed to make up for the interception and punted on their next drive. Tampa Bay extended their lead with a Donald Igwebuike 27-yard field goal. Both teams punted to end the first half.

The Lions converted three third downs on a drive that ended with a 33-yard touchdown pass from Peete to Robert Clark, tying it at 10 apiece. After forcing a Tampa Bay three-and-out, the Lions immediately fumbled it on their own 30-yard line, setting up an Igwebuike 34-yard field goal to set the Buccaneers up 13–10. The teams traded punts before the Lions again fumbled, this time at the Buccaneers' 13-yard line. The Buccaneers, starting at their own 4, converted five first downs to convert an Igwebuike field goal from 33-yards out, bringing them to 16–10 with 1:45 left to play in the game. The Lions, with potentially their last opportunity to score, began at their own 24-yard line. The Lions went 64 yards in 3 plays to end up at the Buccaneers 9-yard line. On fourth down with 29 seconds left in the game, Peete took the ball and ran it into the endzone for the touchdown. The Murray extra point put the Lions up 17–16. The Buccaneers had a chance to attempt to win, but two Ferguson incompletions sealed the game for the Lions in their first win of the season.

==== Week 7: vs. Minnesota Vikings ====
Week 7: Minnesota Vikings at Detroit Lions – Game summary

| Quarter | 1 | 2 | 3 | 4 | Total |
|---|---|---|---|---|---|
| **Vikings** | 3 | 10 | 7 | 0 | **20** |
| Lions | 0 | 0 | 0 | 7 | **7** |

at Pontiac Silverdome, Michigan

- Date: October 22, 1989
- Game time: 1:00 p.m. EDT
- Game attendance: 51,579
- Box score

Game information

**First quarter**

- MIN – Rich Karlis 40-yard field goal, 7:24. Minnesota 3–0 **Drive: 10 plays, 32 yards, 4:57.**

**Second quarter**

- MIN – Rich Karlis 40-yard field goal, 14:55. Minnesota 6–0 **Drive: 8 plays, 55 yards, 4:52.**
- MIN – Herschel Walker 1-yard rush (Rich Karlis kick good), 10:19. Minnesota 13–0 **Drive: 6 plays, 17 yards, 3:04.**

**Third quarter**

- MIN – Alfred Anderson 4-yard rush (Rich Karlis kick good), 9:38. Minnesota 20–0 **Drive: 5 plays, 50 yards, 2:50.**

**Fourth quarter**

- DET – Rodney Peete 2-yard rush (Eddie Murray kick good), 5:07. Minnesota 20–7 **Drive: 7 plays, 80 yards, 2:36.**

**Top passers**

- MIN – Tommy Kramer – 15/20, 143 yards
- DET – Rodney Peete – 19/36, 240 yards, 2 INT

**Top receivers**

- MIN – Alfred Anderson – 4 receptions, 35 yards
- DET – Robert Clark – 4 receptions, 84 yards

**Top rushers**

- MIN – Herschel Walker – 20 rushes, 89 yards, TD
- DET – Barry Sanders – 15 rushes, 59 yards

In Week 7, the Lions hosted their division rival Minnesota Vikings. The Vikings took their first two drives for 40-yard field goals to take the 6–0 lead. On the next Lions drive, a third down handoff to Barry Sanders went awry when he fumbled the ball on the Lion 17-yard line which was recovered by the Vikings. On 4th and 1, the Vikings punched it through with Herschel Walker, taking their lead to 13–0. The Lions moved into Vikings territory for the first time in the game with Rodney Peete's passes of 19, 14, and 13 respectively, but they were forced to punt. The Vikings punted on their next drive. The Lions took their next drive to the Vikings 1-yard line with 0:08 left in the first half, but Peete was strip-sacked to close out the half.

The Vikings punted to start the second half. They got the ball back when Peete was intercepted. The Vikings capitalized with an Alfred Anderson touchdown to bring their lead to 20–0. Both teams punted three times. The Lions got on the board when, on fourth down, Peete ran into the end zone for the touchdown to close the lead to 7–20. The onside kick failed, but the Vikings fumbled it over to the Lions on their ensuing drive. With more than four minutes to go in the game, the Lions attempted a comeback, moving into Vikings territory. On 4th and 14, Peete attempted to pass but dropped the ball, being recovered by the Vikings. The Vikings ran out the rest of the clock to set in stone their 20–7 win.

For the third time in as many seasons, the Lions started 1–6.

==== Week 8: at Green Bay Packers ====
Week 8: Detroit Lions at Green Bay Packers – Game summary

| Quarter | 1 | 2 | 3 | 4 | OT | Total |
|---|---|---|---|---|---|---|
| Lions | 7 | 3 | 0 | 10 | 0 | **20** |
| **Packers** | 3 | 7 | 10 | 0 | 3 | **23** |

at Milwaukee County Stadium, Milwaukee

- Date: October 29, 1989
- Game time: 12:00 p.m. CDT, 1:00 p.m. EDT
- Game attendance: 53,731
- TV announcers (CBS): Tim Ryan and Randy Cross
- Box score

Game information

**First quarter**

- GB – Chris Jacke 49-yard field goal, 7:58. Green Bay 3–0 **Drive: 12 plays, 43 yards, 5:18.**
- DET – Richard Johnson 6-yard pass from Rodney Peete, 0:50. Detroit 7–3 **Drive: 11 plays, 80 yards, 7:08.**

**Second quarter**

- DET – Eddie Murray 42-yard field goal, 10:39. Detroit 10–3 **Drive: 11 plays, 48 yards, 4:12.**
- GB – Jeff Query 4-yard pass from Don Majkowski (Chris Jacke kick good), 0:15. Tied 10–10 **Drive: 7 plays, 80 yards, 1:42.**

**Third quarter**

- GB – Chris Jacke 21-yard field goal, 10:46. Green Bay 13–10 **Drive: 9 plays, 76 yards, 4:14.**
- GB – Sterling Sharpe 2-yard pass from Don Majkowski (Chris Jacke kick good), 4:08. Green Bay 20–10 **Drive: 12 plays, 67 yards, 5:24.**

**Fourth quarter**

- DET – Eddie Murray 46-yard field goal, 11:36. Green Bay 20–13 **Drive: 10 plays, 57 yards, 4:04.**
- DET – Rodney Peete 14-yard run (Eddie Murray kick good), 3:59. Tied 20–20 **Drive: 2 plays, 1 yard, 0:55.**

**Overtime**

- GB – Chris Jacke 38-yard field goal, 12:46. Green Bay 23–20 **Drive: 4 plays, 5 yards, 2:03.**

**Top passers**

- GB – Don Majkowski – 29/45, 367 yards, 2 TD, INT
- DET – Rodney Peete – 14/28, 201 yards, TD, INT

**Top receivers**

- GB – Sterling Sharpe – 7 receptions, 105 yards, TD
- DET – Richard Johnson – 5 receptions, 85 yards, TD

**Top rushers**

- GB – Brent Fullwood – 12 rushes, 35 yards
- DET – Barry Sanders – 30 rushes, 184 yards

In Week 8, the Lions traveled to Milwaukee to play against the Green Bay Packers. The Lions received the opening kickoff and punted. The Packers took their first drive for a Chris Jacke 49-yard field goal to take the early 3–0 lead. The Lions answered with a Rodney Peete 6-yard pass to Richard Johnson for the touchdown to go up 7–3. On the Packers chance to respond, a ball caught by Keith Woodside was fumbled, giving the Lions the ball on their 27-yard line. The Lions capitalized with an Eddie Murray 42-yard field goal to extend the Lions lead to 10–3 and his kicking streak to 19. The Packers punted on their next drive. On the kick attempt that would extend Murray's streak to 20 straight field goals, the ball leaned left and banged off the left upright, ending Murray's streak. On their last drive of the half, Don Majkowski found rookie Jeff Query in the endzone to tie the game at 10–10.

Beginning the second half with the ball, the Packers kicked a 21-yard field goal to put them up 13–10. The Lions were forced to a three-and-out and punted. A Majkowski intercepted was negated by a Lions' holding penalty. The Packers would then take the lead on a Sterling Sharpe 2-yard touchdown to put the Packers up 2 scores with a 20–10 lead. Both teams punted before the Lions kicked a 46-yard field goal to inch closer at 13–20. Both teams punted again before Majowski threw an interception. With the Lions looking to tie the game, Peete scrambled to the endzone to tie the game at 20–20. The Lions defense forced the Packers to punt. The Lions looked poised to score when Peete fumbled the ball, being recovered at the Packers 45-yard line to turn the ball over with 44 seconds to play in the game. The Packers took their drive into field goal range when Jacke missed the 50-yard field goal wide right as time expired to bring up overtime.

The Lions won the overtime coin flip and elected to receive the ball. Peete was intercepted by Mark Murphy and returned 3 yards to the Lions 26-yard line. The Packers set up the game-winning 38-yard field goal which went through the uprights to clinch the victory for the Packers at 23–20.

==== Week 9: at Houston Oilers ====
Week 9: Detroit Lions at Houston Oilers – Game summary

| Quarter | 1 | 2 | 3 | 4 | Total |
|---|---|---|---|---|---|
| Lions | 7 | 10 | 7 | 7 | **31** |
| **Oilers** | 7 | 7 | 14 | 7 | **35** |

at Houston Astrodome, Houston

- Date: November 5, 1989
- Game time: 12:00 p.m. CDT, 1:00 p.m. EDT
- Game attendance: 48,056
- Box score

Game information

**First quarter**

- DET – Barry Sanders 1-yard rush (Eddie Murray kick good), 10:59. Detroit 7–0 **Drive: 9 plays, 83 yards, 4:01.**
- HOU – Lorenzo White 1-yard rush (Tony Zendejas kick good), 5:10. Tied 7–7 **Drive: 10 plays, 75 yards, 5:49.**

**Second quarter**

- DET – Robert Clark 16-yard pass from Rodney Peete (Eddie Murray kick good), 9:25. Detroit 14–7 **Drive: 8 plays, 45 yards, 2:59.**
- HOU – Mike Rozier 1-yard rush (Tony Zendejas kick good), 3:01. Tied 14–14 **Drive: 15 plays, 89 yards, 6:24**
- DET – Eddie Murray 47-yard field goal, 0:02. Detroit 17–14 **Drive: 8 plays, 60 yards, 2:59**

**Third quarter**

- DET – William White 20-yard defensive fumble return (Eddie Murray kick good), 14:41. Detroit 24–14
- HOU – Ernest Givins 6-yard pass from Warren Moon (Tony Zendejas kick good), 10:51. Detroit 24–21 **Drive: 7 plays, 57 yards, 4:40.**
- HOU – Drew Hill 7-yard pass from Warren Moon (Tony Zendejas kick good), 0:56. Houston 28–24 **Drive: 10 plays, 78 yards, 6:08.**

**Fourth quarter**

- HOU – Warren Moon 2-yard rush (Tony Zendejas kick good), 3:15. Houston 35–24 **Drive: 18 plays, 78 yards, 10:29.**
- DET – Barry Sanders 14-yard rush (Eddie Murray kick good), 1:41. Houston 35–31 **Drive: 8 plays, 69 yards, 1:34.**

**Top passers**

- HOU – Warren Moon – 30/38, 345 yards, 2 TD, INT
- DET – Rodney Peete – 18/29, 273 yards, TD, INT

**Top receivers**

- HOU – Drew Hill – 9 receptions, 101 yards, TD
- DET – Robert Clark – 6 receptions, 141 yards, TD

**Top rushers**

- HOU – Allen Pinkett – 8 rushes, 40 yards
- DET – Barry Sanders – 19 rushes, 91 yards, 2 TD

In Week 9, the Lions traveled to Houston to play the Houston Oilers. The Lions received the game opening kickoff and took it 83 yards capped off by a Barry Sanders cut up the middle for the score to put the Lions up 7–0. On the ensuing kickoff, returner On first down at the goal line, Lorenzo White punched into the end zone to tie the game at 7 apiece. After a Lions punt, Warren Moon tossed a pass to Drew Hill which was caught but fumbled and was returned to the Oilers 49-yard line and the Lions took over. Peete found an open Robert Clark for a 16-yard touchdown to put the Lions up 14–7. The Oilers responded when, on 4th and 1, Mike Rozier took the ball into the end zone to tie the game once again at 14. With the clock winding down, the Lions settled for the 47-yard field goal which Eddie Murray drilled down the middle to send the Lions up 17–14 to end the first half.

On the first play of the second half, Rozier took a handoff and fumbled it on the Houston 23 which was picked up by the Lions at the Houston 20 and brought into the endzone by William White to extend the Lions lead to 24–14. The Oilers responded with a Moon pass to Ernest Givins in the back of the end zone to pull the Oilers within 3 at 21–24. The Lions punted on their next drive. Moon connected with Hill again for the go-ahead touchdown to put Houston up 28–24. After a Lions punt, Moon threw an interception on the first play of their new drive, giving the Lions the ball at their own 37. But the Lions would give the ball right back after a pass from Peete to Clark was caught but Steve Brown jarred the football loose. Houston then went on a long drive that took up 10 minutes of the fourth quarter, capping it off in the end zone with a Moon rushing touchdown on 4th and goal to extend their lead to 35–24. Down 11, Sanders took a 14-yard run for a touchdown to bring the Lions closer at 31–35. The Lions failed to convert the onside kick and the Oilers got the ball at the Lions 28. A Moon completed pass was fumbled and turned over to the Lions. With new hope and 1:16 left to play, the Lions began a potential game-winning drive. On 3rd and 7, Peete attempted to find Clark, but the pass was broken up by Patrick Allen with Tracey Eaton nabbing the game-losing interception to seal it for the Lions 31–35.

==== Week 10: vs. Green Bay Packers ====
Week 10: Green Bay Packers at Detroit Lions – Game summary

| Quarter | 1 | 2 | 3 | 4 | Total |
|---|---|---|---|---|---|
| Packers | 0 | 3 | 14 | 5 | **22** |
| **Lions** | 3 | 21 | 0 | 7 | **31** |

at Pontiac Silverdome, Michigan

- Date: November 12, 1989
- Game time: 1:00 p.m. EDT, 12:00 p.m. CDT
- Game attendance: 44,324
- Box score

Game information

**First quarter**

- DET – Eddie Murray 45-yard field goal, 3:48. Detroit 3–0 **Drive: 4 plays, 8 yards, 1:43.**

**Second quarter**

- DET – Richard Johnson 17-yard pass from Rodney Peete (Eddie Murray kick good), 14:13. Detroit 10–0 **Drive: 5 plays, 51 yards, 1:41.**
- DET – Richard Johnson 8-yard pass from Rodney Peete (Eddie Murray kick good), 8:58. Detroit 17–0 **Drive: 2 plays, 13 yards, 0:49.**
- GB – Chris Jacke 34-yard field goal,5:36 . Detroit 17–3 **Drive: 8 plays, 58 yards, 3:22.**
- DET – Jerry Holmes 23-yard interception return (Eddie Murray kick good), 1:46. Detroit 24–3.

**Third quarter**

- GB – Michael Haddix 6-yard pass from Don Majkowski (Chris Jacke kick good), 7:23. Detroit 24–10 **Drive: 9 plays, 50 yards, 2:38.**
- GB – Vince Workman 1-yard rush (Chris Jacke kick good), 4:55. Detroit 24–17 **Drive: 4 plays, 29 yards, 1:55.**

**Fourth quarter**

- GB – Chris Jacke 40-yard field goal, 13:25. Detroit 24–20 **Drive: 9 plays, 26 yards, 1:19.**
- DET – Barry Sanders 1-yard rush (Eddie Murray kick good), . Detroit 31–20 **Drive: 6 plays, 41 yards, 3:03.**
- GB – Rodney Peete out of endzone for safety, 0:06. Detroit 31–22.

**Top passers**

- GB – Don Majkowski – 34/59, 357 yards, TD, 2 INT
- DET – Rodney Peete – 7/15, 77 yards, 2 TD, INT

**Top receivers**

- GB – Sterling Sharpe – 6 receptions, 74 yards
- DET – Richard Johnson – 5 receptions, 53 yards, 2 TD

**Top rushers**

- GB – Don Majowski – 8 rushes, 46 yards
- DET – Barry Sanders – 16 rushes, 69 yards, TD

In Week 10, the Lions hosted their division rival Green Bay Packers. The Lions won the coin toss and took the opening kickoff. After three straight punts, the Packers fumbled on their own 38, turning it over to the Lions. The Lions offense couldn't get a first down, electing to kick a 45-yard field goal which Eddie Murray made to take the early 3–0 lead. An ensuing Packers drive ended with a Majkowski interception on the Lions 46-yard line. Rodney Peete found Richard Johnson in the end zone to stretch their lead to 10–0. The Packers punted on their next drive. On the return, Walter Stanley returned from his own 13-yard line and ran up the field for a 74-yard return to set up the Lions drive at the Packers 13. Peete found Johnson again in the end zone to extend their lead to 17–0. The Packers responded with a Chris Jacke 34-yard field goal to put the Packers on the board 3–17. After a Lions punt in Packers territory, a Majkowski pass intended for Jeff Query was tipped and intercepted by Jerry Holmes and taken to the end zone. On the extra point attempt, Murray completed it for his 900th career point. The Packers attempted to close the deficit with a 52-yard field goal, but it was missed wide right to keep the score at 24–3 going into halftime.

After two punts to start the first half, the Packers took a scoring drive 50 yards to complete with a Majkowski pass to Michael Haddix for the 6-yard touchdown to bring the score to 24–10. On the next Lions possession, Peete overthrew Johnson on a pass that was intercepted and brought to their own 34. The Packers offense took 5 plays to reach the end zone on a Vince Workman 1-yard rush to bring the Packers within 7 at 17–24. The Lions defense held the Packers to a punt on their next drive. On the punt return, Stanley ran 30 yards across midfield, but fumbled at the Packers 29-yard line, being recovered by the Packers. The Packers took the ball 40 yards in nine plays, settling for a Jacke 40-yard field goal to keep the score close at 20–24. The Lions punted on their next drive but immediately got the ball back when Haddix fumbled the ball, being recovered by the Lions to the Packers 41-yard line. The Lions took their drive to the endzone on a Sanders lateral from Peete for the 1-yard touchdown. The Packers began their next drive, converting three third downs in their own territory, setting up a game-deciding 4th and 5 with a little over 2 minutes remaining. Majkowski found Query in the end zone that went through his hands, sealing the game after Peete ran out of the back of the endzone to run the clock out to bring up a final score of 31–22.

==== Week 11: at Cincinnati Bengals ====
Week 11: Detroit Lions at Cincinnati Bengals – Game summary

| Quarter | 1 | 2 | 3 | 4 | Total |
|---|---|---|---|---|---|
| Lions | 7 | 0 | 0 | 0 | **7** |
| **Bengals** | 0 | 28 | 7 | 7 | **42** |

at Pontiac Silverdome, Michigan

- Date: November 19, 1989
- Game time: 1:00 p.m. EDT
- Game attendance: 55,720
- Box score

Game information

**First quarter**

- DET – Barry Sanders 2-yard rush (Eddie Murray kick good), 13:53. Detroit 7–0 **Drive: 4 plays, 74 yards, 0:58.**

**Second quarter**

- CIN – Tim McGee 17-yard pass from Boomer Esiason (Jim Breech kick good), 13:29. Tied 7–7 **Drive: 4 plays, 40 yards, 1:24.**
- CIN – Craig Taylor 3-yard rush (Jim Breech kick good), 4:39. Cincinnati 14–7 **Drive: 12 plays, 68 yards, 7:10.**
- CIN – Craig Taylor 1-yard pass from Boomer Esiason (Jim Breech kick good), 3:26. Cincinnati 21–7 **Drive: 1 play, 1 yard, 0:04**
- CIN – Barney Bussey fumble recovery in end zone (Jim Breech kick good), 2:12. Cincinnati 28–7

**Third quarter**

- CIN – Mike Martin 15-yard pass from Boomer Esiason (Jim Breech kick good), 7:28. Cincinnati 35–7 **Drive: 10 plays, 87 yards, 4:40.**

**Fourth quarter**

- CIN – Kendal Smith 41-yard pass from Erik Wilhelm (Jim Breech kick good), 4:32. Cincinnati 42–7 **Drive: 3 plays, 50 yards, 1:39.**

**Top passers**

- DET – Bob Gagliano – 8/19, 88 yards, 2 INT
- CIN – Boomer Esiason – 30/39, 399 yards, 3 TD, INT

**Top receivers**

- DET – Robert Clark – 2 receptions, 78 yards
- CIN – Tim McGee – 11 receptions, 194 yards, TD

**Top rushers**

- DET – Barry Sanders – 18 attempts, 114 yards, TD
- CIN – James Brooks – 11 attempts, 51 yards

In Week 11, the Lions visited the reigning AFC champion Cincinnati Bengals. The Lions won the coin toss and elected to receive the opening kickoff. On their first drive, facing a 3rd and 7, Rodney Peete found Robert Clark for a 69-yard gain to the Bengals 2-yard line. On the next play, Barry Sanders punched in the 2-yard rushing touchdown to put the Lions up 7–0 in less than 60 seconds. After trading punts, Boomer Esiason threw a pass in the end zone that was intercepted by Jerry Holmes. The Lions began their new drive, but Richard Johnson fumbled and the Bengals were able to recover. The Bengals took 4 plays to score on an Esiason pass to Tim McGee a 17-yard touchdown, tying the game at 7 apiece. The Lions were held to a three-and-out and punted. The ensuing Bengals drive saw them convert a third down and a fourth down, ending with a 3-yard Craig Taylor rush into the end zone to put the Bengals up 14–7. With a chance to respond, the Lions fumbled the ball away on their next drive which was recovered by the Bengals and brought to their own 1-yard line. Esiason found Taylor in the end zone to stretch the Bengals lead to 21–7. The Lions were once again held to a three-and-out. The punt was subsequently blocked by Eric Thomas and recovered in the end zone by Barney Bussey for the Bengals' fourth touchdown of the quarter. The Lions were held to their third three-and-out of the game and punted. Cincinnati missed on a 49-yard Jim Breech field goal that kept the score at 28–7 going into halftime.

The Bengals received the ball to open the second half and made it into Lions territory before fumbling on the Lions 17-yard line. The Lions were held to another three-and-out, and punted. The Bengals moved quickly down the field and scored when Esiason found Mike Martin in the end zone for a 15-yard touchdown. The Lions punted before Cincinnati turned the ball over on down on the Lions 37-yard line. The Lions fumbled in Cincinnati territory. Cincinnati scored on a 41-yard pass from rookie Erik Wilhelm to rookie Kendal Smith put the final score at 42–7.

==== Week 12: vs. Cleveland Browns ====
Week 12: Cleveland Browns at Detroit Lions – Game summary

| Quarter | 1 | 2 | 3 | 4 | Total |
|---|---|---|---|---|---|
| Browns | 0 | 10 | 0 | 0 | **10** |
| **Lions** | 0 | 10 | 3 | 0 | **13** |

at Pontiac Silverdome, Michigan

- Date: November 23, 1989
- Game time: 12:30 p.m. EDT
- Game attendance: 65,624
- TV announcers (NBC): Dick Enberg and Bill Walsh
- Box score

Game information

**First quarter**

- No scoring plays

**Second quarter**

- DET – Eddie Murray 39-yard field goal, 12:31. Detroit 3–0 **Drive: 8 plays, 30 yards, 3:20.**
- CLE – Matt Bahr 35-yard field goal, 7:33. Tied 3–3 **Drive: 10 plays, 60 yards, 4:58.**
- DET – Richard Johnson 27-yard pass from Bob Gagliano, 3:21. Detroit 10–3 **Drive: 7 plays, 67 yards, 4:12**
- CLE – Barry Redden 38-yard rush (Matt Bahr kick good), 1:07. Tied 10–10 **Drive: 8 plays, 94 yards, 2:14.**

**Third quarter**

- DET – Eddie Murray 35-yard field goal, 3:43. Detroit 13–10 **Drive: 10 plays, 48 yards, 3:45.**

**Fourth quarter**

- No scoring plays

**Top passers**

- CLE – Bernie Kosar – 28/38, 296 yards, INT
- DET – Bob Gagliano – 9/19, 143 yards, TD

**Top receivers**

- CLE – Reggie Langhorne – 5 receptions, 72 yards
- DET – Richard Johnson – 3 receptions, 57 yards, TD

**Top rushers**

- CLE – Barry Redden – 1 rush, 38 yards, TD
- DET – Barry Sanders – 28 rushes, 145 yards

In Week 12, the Lions hosted the Cleveland Browns in their annual Thanksgiving game. Both teams punted to begin the game. Threatening to score, Barry Sanders fumbled the ball forward through the end zone where it was recovered by the Browns for a touchback. After three consecutive punts, the Lions scored with a 39-yard field goal made by Eddie Murray to put them ahead 3–0. The Browns responded by driving downfield to score on a 35-yard field goal to tie it at 3 apiece. The Lions responded with a Bob Gagliano found Richard Johnson in the end zone for a touchdown. The Browns were able to respond with a Barry Redden 38-yard rushing touchdown to put the halftime score at 10–10.

Beginning the second half with three punts, the Lions scored with a 35-yard field goal to take the lead 13–10. The Browns fumbled the ball to the Lions, but they went three-and-out and punted. The Browns opted for the Matt Bahr 44-yard field goal, but Bahr missed wide right to keep the score at 13–10. The Lions went three-and-out again before the next Browns drive ended on a turnover on downs. With 10 seconds remaining, Kosar's hail mary was intercepted by Jerry Holmes, sealing the 13–10 win for the Lions.

==== Week 13: vs. New Orleans Saints ====
Week 13: New Orleans Saints at Detroit Lions – Game summary

| Quarter | 1 | 2 | 3 | 4 | Total |
|---|---|---|---|---|---|
| Saints | 0 | 14 | 0 | 0 | **14** |
| **Lions** | 7 | 7 | 7 | 0 | **21** |

at Pontiac Silverdome, Michigan

- Date: December 3, 1989
- Game time: 1:00 p.m. EDT; 12:00 p.m. CDT
- Game attendance: 38,550
- Box score

Game information

**First quarter**

- DET – Rodney Peete 6-yard rush (Eddie Murray kick good), 7:30. Detroit 7–0 **Drive: 9 plays, 83 yards, 2:50.**

**Second quarter**

- NO – Dalton Hilliard 1-yard rush (Morten Andersen kick good), 14:20. Tied 7–7 **Drive: 8 plays, 34 yards, 4:26.**
- DET – Barry Sanders 3-yard rush (Eddie Murray kick good), 11:07. Detroit 14–7 **Drive: 5 plays, 82 yards, 3:13.**
- NO – Bobby Morse 99-yard kickoff return (Morten Anderson kick good), 10:46. Tied 14–14

**Third quarter**

- DET – Richard Johnson 75-yard pass from Bob Gagliano (Eddie Murray kick good), 6:47. Detroit 21–14 **Drive: 3 plays, 85 yards, 1:56.**

**Fourth quarter**

- No scoring plays

**Top passers**

- NO – Bobby Hebert – 16/26, 99 yards, INT
- DET – Rodney Peete – 8/18, 177 yards, INT

**Top receivers**

- NO – Hoby Brenner – 4 receptions, 48 yards
- DET – Richard Johnson – 8 receptions, 248 yards, TD

**Top rushers**

- NO – Dalton Hilliard – 18 rush, 67 yards, TD
- DET – Barry Sanders – 20 rushes, 72 yards, TD

In Week 13, the Lions hosted the New Orleans Saints. After the Saints received the opening kickoff, the teams punted three times. Scoring began when Rodney Peete ran into the end zone for the touchdown. On the first play of the next Saints possession, quarterback Bobby Hebert found tight end Hoby Brenner for 15 yards before Brenner lost the ball when hit, turning it over to the Lions in Saints territory. Peete threw an interception that bounced off of Robert Clark's hands. The Saints went three-and-out on their possession before the Lions handed the ball back on a bad snap that Peete fumbled. The Saints took advantage, advancing 34 yards in 8 plays to punch in the 1-yard rushing touchdown from Dalton Hilliard to even the score at 7–7. The Lions responded with a Barry Sanders run into the end zone to take the lead 14–7. On the kickoff, Bobby Morse took the ball out from the 1-yard line, running up the left side of the field for the 99-yard kickoff return touchdown to tie it up 14–14. Three punts later led to the Saints beginning a drive on their own 49. They took the drive into Lions territory and chose to kick a field goal with 0:18 left in the half. Morten Andersen missed wide right on the 48-yard attempt to keep the score at 14–14 leading into the half.

Both teams punted twice to start the second half. The Lions began their third drive of the second half on their own 15-yard line. Bob Gagliano, substituting for an injured Peete, found Richard Johnson for the 75-yard touchdown pass to put the Lions up 21–14. Both teams punted before the Saints found themselves inside Lions territory moving into the fourth quarter. But Hebert was intercepted by Jerry Holmes for a Lions touchback. Both teams punted twice, including a Saints punt with 4:11 left. The Lions were successfully able to run out the clock to secure the 21–14 win.

==== Week 14: at Chicago Bears ====
Week 14: Detroit Lions at Chicago Bears – Game summary

| Quarter | 1 | 2 | 3 | 4 | Total |
|---|---|---|---|---|---|
| **Lions** | 0 | 17 | 7 | 3 | **27** |
| Bears | 3 | 7 | 0 | 7 | **17** |

at Soldier Field, Illinois

- Date: December 10, 1989
- Game time: 12:00 p.m. CDT; 1:00 p.m. EDT
- Game attendance: 52,650
- Box score

Game information

**First quarter**

- CHI – Kevin Butler 22-yard field goal, 9:22. Chicago 3–0 **Drive: 7 plays, 37 yards, 3:53.**

**Second quarter**

- DET – Bob Gagliano 18-yard rush (Eddie Murray kick good), 14:10. Detroit 7–3 **Drive: 8 plays, 74 yards, 5:07.**
- DET – Barry Sanders 18-yard rush (Eddie Murray kick good), 7:25. Detroit 14–3 **Drive: 5 plays, 81 yards, 2:35.**
- CHI – Brad Muster 11-yard rush (Kevin Butler kick good), 2:43. Detroit 14–10 **Drive: 3 plays, 25 yards, 1:48.**
- DET – Eddie Murray 45-yard field goal, 0:44. Detroit 17–10 **Drive: 8 plays, 29 yards, 1:59.**

**Third quarter**

- DET – Barry Sanders 3-yard rush (Eddie Murray kick good), 7:55. Detroit 24–10 **Drive: 11 plays, 82 yards, 5:28.**

**Fourth quarter**

- DET – Eddie Murray 28-yard field goal, 12:46. Detroit 27–10 **Drive: 6 plays, 20 yards, 3:12.**
- CHI – Neal Anderson 1-yard rush (Kevin Butler kick good), 5:34. Detroit 27–17 **Drive: 8 plays, 41 yards, 2:40.**

**Top passers**

- DET – Bob Gagliano – 13/23, 168 yards, INT
- CHI – Jim Harbaugh – 21/29, 179 yards, INT

**Top receivers**

- DET – Jason Phillips – 3 receptions, 47 yards
- CHI – Neal Anderson – 9 receptions, 58 yards

**Top rushers**

- DET – Barry Sanders – 26 rushes, 120 rushes, 2 TD
- CHI – Jim Harbaugh – 8 rushes, 61 yards

In Week 14, the Lions visited their division rival Chicago Bears. The Lions received the opening kickoff but went three-and-out and punted. The Bears began their first drive on the Lions 47, getting down to the Lions 5 and settling for a 22-yard field goal to take the lead 3–0. After two punts, Bob Gagliano threw an interception. Bears kicker Kevin Butler tried a 43-yard field but missed it wide right. Gagliano led a 74-yard drive to cap it off with his own 14-yard rushing touchdown to take the lead 7–3. After a Bears punt, Barry Sanders extended the lead with an 18-yard rushing touchdown. The Bears punted, but returner Walter Stanley fumbled and turned it over. The Bears scored on a Brad Muster 11-yard rushing touchdown to bring the Bears within 4. The Lions responded by bringing their lead to 7 on an Eddie Murray 45-yard field goal to bring the halftime score to 17–10.

The Lions forced a three-and-out to make the Bears punt. The Lions then took the ball 72 yards across 11 plays, capped off by a Sanders 3-yard rushing touchdown. The Bears crossed midfield on their next drive but were forced to punt. The Lions were forced to a three-and-out and punted. On the punt return, Bears returner Dennis McKinnon fumbled it, turning it over to the Lions on the Bears' 30-yard line. With a drive crossing into the fourth quarter, the Lions settled for a field goal on the Bears 10-yard line which Murray made to give the Lions their 27–10 lead. After a Harbaugh interception, the Lions were forced to a three-and-out. On the punt, Jim Arnold punted the ball into the back of a Lions player which traveled 10 yards backwards out of bounds, giving the Bears good field position. They scored with a Neal Anderson 1-yard touchdown run to put the Lions lead at 27–10. The Lions punted on three-and-out, and the Bears took their drive into the two-minute warning. The Bears attempted to bring the game within a touchdown lead, but Butler missed the 37-yard field goal, solidifying the 27–17 win for the Lions.

==== Week 15: vs. Tampa Bay Buccaneers ====
Week 15: Tampa Bay Buccaneers vs. Detroit Lions – Game summary

| Quarter | 1 | 2 | 3 | 4 | Total |
|---|---|---|---|---|---|
| Buccaneers | 0 | 0 | 0 | 7 | **7** |
| **Lions** | 14 | 10 | 3 | 6 | **33** |

at Pontiac Stadium, Michigan

- Date: December 17, 1989
- Game time: 1:00 p.m. EDT
- Game attendance: 40,362
- Box score

Game information

**First quarter**

- DET – Richard Johnson 2-yard pass from Bob Gagliano (Eddie Murray kick good), 11:13. Detroit 7–0 **Drive: 6 plays, 67 yards, 3:47.**
- DET – Jason Phillips 55-yard pass from Bob Gagliano (Eddie Murray kick good), 4:57. Detroit 14–0 **Drive: 3 plays, 50 yards, 1:01.**

**Second quarter**

- DET – Eddie Murray 33-yard field goal, 13:18. Detroit 17–0 **Drive: 12 plays, 53 yards, 4:53.**
- DET – Barry Sanders 4-yard rush (Eddie Murray kick good), 2:54. Detroit 24–0 **Drive: 7 plays, 59 yards, 3:17.**

**Third quarter**

- DET – Eddie Murray 43-yard field goal, 9:09. Detroit 27–0 **Drive: 10 plays, 39 yards, 3:29.**

**Fourth quarter**

- DET – Eddie Murray 35-yard field goal, 2:58. Detroit 30–0 **Drive: 9 plays, 58 yards, 5:06.**
- DET – Eddie Murray 36-yard field goal, 0:20. Detroit 33–0 **Drive: 7 plays, 11 yards, 2:12.**
- TAM – Mark Carrier 69-yard pass from Joe Ferguson (Donald Igwebuike kick good), 0:00. Detroit 33–7 **Drive: 1 play, 69 yards, 0:20.**

**Top passers**

- TAM – Joe Ferguson – 7/18, 161 yards, TD, 3 INT
- DET – Bob Gagliano – 19/33, 192 yards, 2 TD, INT

**Top receivers**

- TAM – Mark Carrier – 4 receptions, 131 yards, TD
- DET – Jason Phillips – 10 receptions, 115 yards, TD

**Top rushers**

- TAM – Lars Tate – 7 rushes, 18 yards
- DET – Barry Sanders – 21 rushes, 104 yards, TD

For their last divisional matchup of the season, the Lions hosted the Tampa Bay Buccaneers. The Lions received the opening kickoff and took 67 yards to score on a Bob Gagliano 2-yard pass to Richard Johnson to take the early 7–0 lead. The Bucs punted on their ensuing drive, as did the Lions on their next. On the second play of the Buccaneers' next drive, Vinny Testaverde threw an interception to Jerry Holmes. The Lions took 3 plays for Gagliano to throw a 55-yard touchdown pass to Jason Phillips to go up 14–0. The Bucs went three-and-out, with the Lions taking their drive into the second quarter. Down to the Bucs' 15-yard line, Eddie Murray kicked a 33-yard field goal. On the Bucs next drive, the Lions sacked Testaverde on third down, putting him out of the game and forcing the Bucs to punt. Both teams were held to a three-and-out in their following drives. The Lions scored on a Barry Sanders 4-yard touchdown to take the 24–0 lead. On the Bucs next drive, Joe Ferguson fumbled the ball to the Lions. The Lions took the ball down to the Bucs' 1-yard line, but Sanders fumbled on a rush and turned it over to end the half.

The Lions held the Buccaneers to a three-and-out to start the second half. On the Lions next drive, they took 10 plays to end up at the Buccaneers 25-yard line, where Murray kicked a 43-yard field goal. The Buccaneers' next drive took them across midfield and to the Lions 24-yard line before Ferguson was intercepted. Gagliano threw a batted pass that was intercepted at the Bucs 28-yard line. Both teams punted thrice as the game moved into the fourth quarter. Another Ferguson interception set the Lions up at their own 25. Chuck Long came into the game to replace Gagliano due to the blowout. Long led the Lions across midfield with Murray kicking a 35-yard field goal. A third Ferguson interception set the Lions up at the Bucs 30. Murray kicked his third field goal 36-yards with 0:20 left in the game. The Bucs got the ball with 0:12 left in the game. On the first play, Ferguson found Mark Carrier for a 69-yard touchdown with time expiring, denying the Lions their first shutout since Week 7 in 1987 and finalizing the score at 33–7.

==== Week 16: at Atlanta Falcons ====
Week 16: Detroit Lions at Atlanta Falcons – Game summary

| Quarter | 1 | 2 | 3 | 4 | Total |
|---|---|---|---|---|---|
| **Lions** | 7 | 7 | 10 | 7 | **31** |
| Falcons | 0 | 10 | 0 | 14 | **24** |

at Atlanta-Fulton County Stadium, Georgia

- Date: December 24, 1989
- Game time: 1:00 p.m. EDT
- Game attendance: 7,792
- Box score

Game information

**First quarter**

- DET – Richard Johnson 34-yard pass from Bob Gagliano (Eddie Murray kick good), 11:38. Detroit 7–0 **Drive: 9 plays, 41 yards, 3:22.**

**Second quarter**

- ATL – Greg Davis 25-yard field goal, 13:57. Detroit 7–0 **Drive: 7 plays, 34 yards, 1:14.**
- DET – Barry Sanders 25-yard rush (Eddie Murray kick good), 10:38. Detroit 14–3 **Drive: 5 plays, 74 yards, 3:19.**
- ATL – Greg Lang 9-yard pass from Chris Miller (Greg Davis kick good), 0:19. Detroit 14–10 **Drive: 9 plays, 40 yards, 1:41.**

**Third quarter**

- DET – Eddie Murray 39-yard field goal, 11:32. Detroit 17–10 **Drive: 11 plays, 52 yards, 3:28.**
- DET – Barry Sanders 17-yard rush (Eddie Murray kick good), 6:10. Detroit 24–10 **Drive: 6 plays, 65 yards, 1:24.**

**Fourth quarter**

- DET – Barry Sanders 18-yard rush (Eddie Murray kick good), 14:08. Detroit 31–10 **Drive: 5 plays, 36 yards, 2:25.**
- ATL – Keith Jones 1-yard rush (Greg Davis kick good), 4:37. Detroit 31–17 **Drive: 8 plays, 59 yards, 3:09.**
- ATL – Michael Haynes 6-yard pass from Chris Miller (Greg Davis kick good), 0:51. Detroit 31–24 **Drive: 10 plays, 48 yards.**

**Top passers**

- DET – Bob Gagliano – 17/30, 213 yards, TD, INT
- ATL – Chris Miller – 37/66, 334 yards, 2 TD, INT

**Top receivers**

- DET – Richard Johnson – 7 receptions, 135 yards, TD
- ATL – Gene Lang – 6 receptions, TD

**Top rushers**

- DET – Barry Sanders – 20 rushes, 158 yards, 3 TD
- ATL – Keith Jones – 7 rushes, 37 yards, TD

For the final game of the season, the Lions traveled to Atlanta to play the Atlanta Falcons. The Falcons received the opening kickoff and got into Lions' territory before Greg Davis tried a 42-yard field goal, but missed it wide right. The Lions opened up the scoring with a Bob Gagliano pass to Richard Johnson for the 34-yard score. Following four straight punts, the Falcons took a scoring drive into the second quarter, allowing Davis to kick a 25-yard field goal to put the Falcons on the board 3–7. The Lions responded with a Barry Sanders 25-yard rushing touchdown. After three punts, an errant pass by Gagliano was intercepted, setting the Falcons up on the Lions' 40 going into the two-minute warning. The Falcons moved slowly down the field before scoring on a Chris Miller 9-yard pass to Gene Lang to put the Falcons at 10–14 going into halftime.

On the opening drive of the second half, the Lions settled for a 39-yard field goal to put the Lions up 17–10. After a Falcons punt, Johnson fumbled on a pass on the first play of the drive. The Falcons punted again as Sanders rushed for a 17-yard touchdown, putting the Lions lead at 24–10. Two punts and a Miller interception later, the Lions scored again on a Sanders rushing touchdown, this time from 18 yards out to take the 31–10 lead. The Falcons failed to score in Lions territory with a turnover on downs. After the Lions went three-and-out, Miller passed six straight times before the Falcons scored on a Keith Jones 1-yard rushing touchdown. The Falcons kicked onside with 4:37 left in the game. The ball was recovered by Falcons corner Robert Moore. On their next drive, they scored on a Miller 6-yard pass to Michael Haynes with 0:51 left in the game. The Falcons attempted another onside kick, but failed. The Lions ran the clock out to win 31–24 and clinch their 7–9 record.

=== Standings ===
NFC Central
| | W | L | T | PCT | DIV | CONF | PF | PA | STK |
|---|---|---|---|---|---|---|---|---|---|
| Minnesota Vikings^{(3)} | 10 | 6 | 0 | .625 | 6–2 | 8–4 | 362 | 356 | W1 |
| Green Bay Packers | 10 | 6 | 0 | .625 | 5–3 | 10–4 | 362 | 275 | W2 |
| Detroit Lions | 7 | 9 | 0 | .438 | 4–4 | 6–6 | 312 | 364 | W5 |
| Chicago Bears | 6 | 10 | 0 | .375 | 2–6 | 4–8 | 358 | 377 | L6 |
| Tampa Bay Buccaneers | 5 | 11 | 0 | .313 | 3–5 | 5–7 | 320 | 419 | L4 |

== See also ==
- 1989 NFL season
- List of Detroit Lions seasons
