= Victor Jones (linebacker) =

American football player (born 1966)

No. 52, 57
- Position: Linebacker

Personal information
- Born: October 19, 1966 (age 60); Rockville, Maryland, U.S.
- Listed height: 6 ft 2 in (1.88 m)
- Listed weight: 250 lb (113 kg)

Career information
- High school: Peary (Rockville)
- College: Virginia Tech
- NFL draft: 1988: 12th round, 310th overall pick

Career history
- Tampa Bay Buccaneers (1988); Detroit Lions (1989–1994)

Career NFL statistics
- Tackles: 124
- Fumble recoveries: 3
- Interceptions: 1
- Stats at Pro Football Reference

Victor Purnell Jones (born October 19, 1966) is an American former professional football player who was a linebacker in the National Football League (NFL) for the Tampa Bay Buccaneers and Detroit Lions. He played college football for the Virginia Tech Hokies and was selected in the twelfth round of the 1988 NFL draft with the 310th overall pick.

In 1994, Jones received the Ed Block Courage Award and made the list of Hokies in the Pro under the category of special teams.

== College career ==
Jones was coached at Virginia Tech by Mike Archer. In the 1986 Peach Bowl, Jones recovered a fumble at the Virginia Tech 41 to help secure the win against NC State Wolfpack. The game was the final contest of the 1986 NCAA Division I-A football season for both teams, and ended in a 25–24 victory for Virginia Tech, the first bowl victory in school history.

== Professional career ==
=== NFL Stats ===
SEASON	TEAM	GP	GS	Sacks	FR	TACKLES
1988	TAM	8	0	1	0	3
1989	DET	11	9	0	2	50
1990	DET	16	5	0	0	44
1991	DET	10	0	0	1	13
1992	DET	16	0	0	0	6
1993	DET	16	1	0	0	7
1994	DET	16	0	0	0	1
Totals		93	15	1	3	124

== Personal life ==
Jones grew up in Rockville, Maryland. He currently lives in Charlotte, North Carolina. He has been an active member of the NFL Retired Players Association, Charlotte Chapter since 2000.

After leaving the NFL, Jones was a pharmaceutical account executive for Sanofi-Aventis from 1996 to 2001. In 2006, Jones and his wife Detra started a franchise called Girls Just Wanna Have Fun at Spa’ Ladi-da! for tweens. From 2001 to 2009 Jones owned SCW Residential Care, a retirement community. From 2011 to 2013 Jones was an owner of 212 Sports Network. In 2013 Jones became a State Farm insurance agent. In 2017 he moved to Maryland.
