= Robert Clark (gridiron football) =

American football player (born 1965)

No. 89, 82, 81, 86
- Position: Wide receiver

Personal information
- Born: August 6, 1965 (age 61); Brooklyn, New York, U.S.
- Listed height: 5 ft 11 in (1.80 m)
- Listed weight: 175 lb (79 kg)

Career information
- High school: Richmond (VA) Marshall-Walker
- College: North Carolina Central
- NFL draft: 1987: 10th round, 263rd overall pick

Career history
- New Orleans Saints (1987–1988); Detroit Lions (1989–1991); Miami Dolphins (1992); Toronto Argonauts (1993); Baltimore Stallions (1994–1995)

Awards and highlights
- Grey Cup champion (1995)

Career NFL statistics
- Receptions: 165
- Receiving yards: 2,644
- Touchdowns: 18
- Stats at Pro Football Reference

Robert James Clark (born August 6, 1965) is an American former professional football player who was a wide receiver in the National Football League (NFL). He played for the New Orleans Saints (1987–1988), Detroit Lions (1989–1991), Miami Dolphins (1992), and the Baltimore Stallions (1994–1995) of the Canadian Football League (CFL).

Pre-draft measurables
Height	Weight	Arm length	Hand span	40-yard dash	10-yard split	20-yard split	20-yard shuttle	Vertical jump	Broad jump	Bench press
5 ft 9 1/4 in (1.76 m)	170 lb (77 kg)	29 3/4 in (0.76 m)	9 1/2 in (0.24 m)	4.58 s	1.56 s	2.62 s	4.58 s	28.5 in (0.72 m)	9 ft 6 in (2.90 m)	4 reps
All values from NFL Combine

He was selected by the Saints in the tenth round of the 1987 NFL draft.

Clark graduated from North Carolina Central University in 1987 with a BA degree in political science. He holds multiple receiving and offensive records with Central.

== NFL career statistics ==
Legend
**Bold**	Career high

=== Regular season ===
Year	Team	Games		Receiving				
Year	Team	GP	GS	Rec	Yds	Avg	Lng	TD
1987	NOR	2	0	3	38	12.7	14	0
1988	NOR	**16**	0	19	245	12.9	21	2
1989	DET	**16**	**16**	41	748	18.2	**69**	2
1990	DET	**16**	15	**52**	**914**	17.6	57	**8**
1991	DET	14	14	47	640	13.6	68	6
1992	MIA	3	0	3	59	**19.7**	45	0
		67	45	165	2,644	16.0	69	18

=== Playoffs ===
Year	Team	Games		Receiving				
Year	Team	GP	GS	Rec	Yds	Avg	Lng	TD
1991	DET	1	0	2	29	14.5	16	0
		1	0	2	29	14.5	16	0
