= Robert Claiborne (American football) =

American football player (born 1967)

No. 84, 81
- Position: Wide receiver

Personal information
- Born: July 10, 1967 (age 59); New Orleans, Louisiana, U.S.
- Listed height: 5 ft 10 in (1.78 m)
- Listed weight: 175 lb (79 kg)

Career information
- High school: Mount Miguel (Spring Valley, California)
- College: San Diego State
- NFL draft: 1990: 12th round, 313th overall pick

Career history
- Detroit Lions (1990–1991); San Diego Chargers (1992); Tampa Bay Buccaneers (1993); Las Vegas Posse (1994)

Career NFL statistics
- Receptions: 6
- Receiving yards: 76
- Return yards: 89
- Stats at Pro Football Reference

Robert Claiborne (born July 10, 1967) is an American former professional football player who was a wide receiver in the National Football League (NFL) and Canadian Football League (CFL). He was selected by the Detroit Lions in the 12th round of the 1990 NFL draft with the 313th overall pick. He played for the San Diego Chargers in 1992, Tampa Bay Buccaneers in 1993, and the Las Vegas Posse in 1994. He played college football for the San Diego State Aztecs.
