= James Cribbs =

American football player (born 1966)

No. 99
- Position: Defensive end

Personal information
- Born: July 10, 1966 (age 60); Memphis, Tennessee, U.S.
- Listed height: 6 ft 3 in (1.91 m)
- Listed weight: 269 lb (122 kg)

Career information
- High school: Hamilton (Memphis)
- College: Memphis
- NFL draft: 1989: 12th round, 309th overall pick

Career history
- Detroit Lions (1989); Green Bay Packers (1990)
- Stats at Pro Football Reference

James Cribbs (born July 10, 1966) is an American former professional football player who was a defensive end for the Detroit Lions of the National Football League (NFL) in 1989. He played college football for the Memphis Tigers and was selected by the Lions in the 12th round of the 1989 NFL draft.
