= Jeff Campbell (American football) =

American football player (born 1968)

No. 87, 10, 86
- Position: Wide receiver

Personal information
- Born: March 29, 1968 (age 58); Denver, Colorado, U.S.
- Listed height: 5 ft 8 in (1.73 m)
- Listed weight: 167 lb (76 kg)

Career information
- High school: Minturn (CO) Battle Mountain
- College: Colorado
- NFL draft: 1990: 5th round, 118th overall pick

Career history
- Detroit Lions (1990–1993); Denver Broncos (1994)

Awards and highlights
- Second-team All-Big Eight (1989)

Career NFL statistics
- Receptions: 37
- Receiving yards: 517
- Touchdowns: 4
- Stats at Pro Football Reference

Jeff Campbell (born March 29, 1968) is an American former professional football player who played wide receiver for the Detroit Lions and Denver Broncos. He was selected by the Lions in the fifth round of the 1990 NFL draft with the 118th overall pick.
