= Jerry Woods =

American football player (born 1966)

No. 28, 29, 35
- Position: Defensive back

Personal information
- Born: February 13, 1966 (age 60); Dyersburg, Tennessee, U.S.
- Listed height: 5 ft 10 in (1.78 m)
- Listed weight: 187 lb (85 kg)

Career information
- High school: Washington Park (Racine, Wisconsin)
- College: Northern Michigan
- NFL draft: 1989: 7th round, 170th overall pick

Career history
- Detroit Lions (1989); Green Bay Packers (1990); Barcelona Dragons (1992); Tampa Bay Storm (1993)

Awards and highlights
- ArenaBowl champion (1993)
- Stats at Pro Football Reference
- Stats at ArenaFan.com

Jerry Lee Woods (born February 13, 1966) is an American former professional football defensive back in the National Football League (NFL).

== Early life ==
Woods was born Jerry Lee Woods on February 13, 1966, in Dyersburg, Tennessee. He grew up in Racine, Wi. Attended Park High School where he was a three sport athlete. All State and All County pole vaulter and football player. He was also an honor student. 1989 Graduate of Northern Michigan University. Holds a Bachelor of Science degree in Industrial Technology with a minor in Drawing & Design. four year starting defensive back. 2× Kodak All American, national player of the year nominee, 2× All Conference, Specialist of the Year, team MVP, 3× Most Valuable Defensive Back, 1988 Dean's List honoree, 2001 NMU College Hall of Fame inductee, 2x team captain. He served two terms on Alumni Association Board of Directors.

== Professional career ==
Woods was selected in the seventh round of the 1989 NFL draft by the Detroit Lions and spent that season with the team. He spent the next season with the Green Bay Packers. He played four years of professional football, two in the National Football League (Green Bay Packers and Detroit Lions), World League of American Football (Barcelona Dragons) and Arena Football League (Tampa Bay Storm) as a defensive back and special teams player.

== Personal life ==
Woods was previously employed at Graco, Inc (Minneapolis, Minnesota). Since 1998 he's been employed at Cummins, Inc (Minneapolis). Both of his parents, Mary Koonce-Johnson (Kenosha, Wisconsin) and Jere Woods (Missouri) retired from Chrysler, Inc.
