= Bruce Alexander (American football) =

American football player (born 1965)

No. 32
- Position: Cornerback

Personal information
- Born: September 17, 1965 (age 61); Lufkin, Texas, U.S.
- Listed height: 5 ft 9 in (1.75 m)
- Listed weight: 170 lb (77 kg)

Career information
- High school: Lufkin (Texas)
- College: Stephen F. Austin (1985–1988)
- NFL draft: 1989: undrafted

Career history
- Detroit Lions (1989–1991); Miami Dolphins (1992–1993)

Career NFL statistics
- Interceptions: 2
- Fumble recoveries: 1
- Sacks: 1
- Stats at Pro Football Reference

Bruce Edward Alexander (born September 17, 1965) is an American former professional football player who was a cornerback for five seasons in the National Football League (NFL) with the Detroit Lions and Miami Dolphins. He played college football for the Stephen F. Austin Lumberjacks.

== Early life and college ==
Bruce Edward Alexander was born on September 17, 1965, in Lufkin, Texas. He attended Lufkin High School in Lufkin.

He was a four-year letterman for the Lumberjacks of Stephen F. Austin State University from to 1985 to 1988.

== Professional career ==
After going undrafted in the 1989 NFL draft, Alexander signed with the Detroit Lions on May 1. He was released on August 30 and signed to the team's practice squad on September 6. He was promoted to the active roster on November 3 and played in eight games, starting one, for the Lions during the 1989 season. He returned five kicks for 100 yards that year. Alexander was placed on injured reserve on September 4, 1990. He was activated on December 7 and appeared in one game for the Lions that season. He became a free agent after the season and re-signed with the Lions. He was placed on injured reserve on September 28, 1991, and was activated on November 22, 1991. Overall, Alexander played in nine games for the Lions during the 1991 season, recording one interception. He also appeared in two playoff games that year, returning one kick for 15 yards. He became a free agent again after the season.

Alexander was signed by the Miami Dolphins on March 26, 1992. He played in the first 12 games of the 1992 season, starting one, for the Dolphins and made one interception before being placed on injured reserve on December 2, 1992. He was later activated in time for the postseason and appeared in two playoff games that year. Alexander played in 14 games in 1993, totaling one sack and one fumble recovery. He became a free agent after the season.
