= Billie Matthews =

American football coach

Personal information
- Born: March 15, 1930; Houston, Texas, U.S.
- Died: December 7, 2001 (aged 71); Redwood City, California, U.S.

Career history
- Kashmere High School (1959-1970) Head coach; UCLA Bruins (1971) Defensive backs coach; UCLA Bruins (1972–1978) Running backs coach; San Francisco 49ers (1979–1982) Running backs coach; Philadelphia Eagles (1983–1984) Running backs coach; Indianapolis Colts (1985–1986) Offensive coordinator/running backs coach; Kansas City Chiefs (1987–1988) Running backs coach; Detroit Lions (1989–1991) Defensive backs coach; Detroit Lions (1992–1994) Running backs coach

Awards and highlights
- Super Bowl champion (XVI)
- Coaching profile at Pro Football Reference

Billie Matthews (March 15, 1930 – December 7, 2001) was an American football coach who was the offensive coordinator of the Indianapolis Colts from 1985 to 1986. He was also the San Francisco 49ers running backs coach from 1979 to 1982, the Philadelphia Eagles running backs coach from 1983 to 1984, the Kansas City Chiefs running backs coach from 1987 to 1988, and the Detroit Lions defensive backs and running backs coach from 1989 to 1994.

== Early life ==
Matthews was born on March 15, 1930, in Houston Texas.

== Coaching career ==
=== Kashmere High School ===
His first coaching position came as the head coach at Kashmere High School. He was the head coach for 12 seasons, from 1959 to 1970.

=== UCLA Bruins ===
Matthews got a job as the defensive backs coach for the UCLA Bruins in 1971. He became the running backs coach the next year and was the coach until 1978.

=== San Francisco 49ers ===
Matthews got his first NFL coaching job as the running backs coach for the San Francisco 49ers. He was coach when they won Super Bowl XVI. He was coach from 1979 to 1982.

=== Philadelphia Eagles ===
He was the running backs coach for the Philadelphia Eagles from 1983 to 1984.

=== Indianapolis Colts ===
From 1985 to 1986, he was the offensive coordinator and running backs coach for the Indianapolis Colts.

=== Kansas City Chiefs ===
From 1987 to 1988, he was the running backs coach for the Kansas City Chiefs.

=== Detroit Lions ===
He was the defensive backs coach from 1989 to 1991 for the Detroit Lions. He switched to running backs coach from 1992 to 1994. For three years, he was the running backs coach of Barry Sanders.
