= Richard Johnson (wide receiver) =

American football player (born 1961)

No. 83, 84, 22
- Position: Wide receiver

Personal information
- Born: October 19, 1961 (age 65); Los Angeles, California, U.S.
- Listed height: 5 ft 7 in (1.70 m)
- Listed weight: 175 lb (79 kg)

Career information
- High school: San Pedro (CA)
- College: Los Angeles Harbor College Colorado

Career history
- 1983: Denver Gold
- 1984–1985: Houston Gamblers
- 1987: Washington Redskins
- 1989–1990: Detroit Lions
- Stats at Pro Football Reference

Richard LaVon Johnson (born October 19, 1961) is an American former professional football player who played wide receiver in the National Football League (NFL) for three seasons for the Washington Redskins and Detroit Lions. Previously, he played with the Denver Gold and Houston Gamblers of the United States Football League (USFL). He played college football at the University of Colorado.
