= William White (American football) =

American football player (1966–2022)

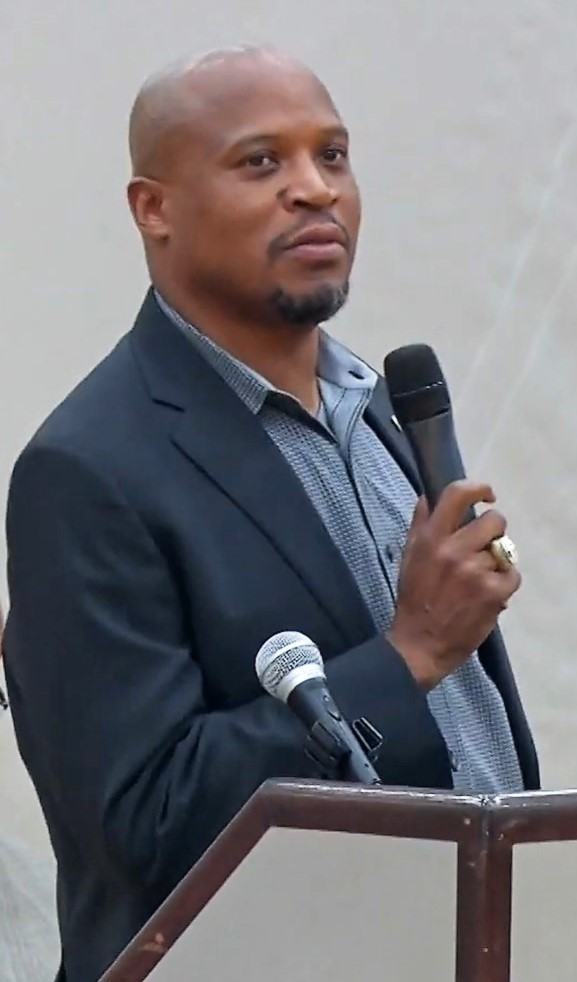
- White at a 2019 Lima Senior High School event in his honor

No. 35
- Position: Safety

Personal information
- Born: February 19, 1966; Lima, Ohio, U.S.
- Died: July 28, 2022 (aged 56)
- Listed height: 5 ft 10 in (1.78 m)
- Listed weight: 199 lb (90 kg)

Career information
- High school: Lima Senior
- College: The Ohio State University
- NFL draft: 1988: 4th round, 85th overall pick

Career history
- Detroit Lions (1988–1993); Kansas City Chiefs (1994–1996); Atlanta Falcons (1997–1998)

Awards and highlights
- First-team All-Big Ten (1987)

Career NFL statistics
- Tackles: 721
- Interceptions: 20
- Touchdowns: 4
- Stats at Pro Football Reference

William Eugene White, Sr. (February 19, 1966 – July 28, 2022) was an American professional football player who was a safety for eleven seasons in the National Football League (NFL). He played for the Detroit Lions, Kansas City Chiefs, and Atlanta Falcons from 1988 to 1998.

== Early life ==
White was born in Lima, Ohio, on February 19, 1966. He attended Lima Senior High School in his hometown, playing on its football and basketball teams before graduating in 1984. He then studied at Ohio State University, where he played as defensive back for the Ohio State Buckeyes. He served as its co-captain during his senior year, when he was named to the All-Big Ten Conference team. He played on the 1984 and 1986 teams that won the Big Ten Conference championship. During the 1985 season, he had the second-most interceptions (6) in the conference after Jay Norvell, before finishing third in interception return yards (85) and fifth in interceptions (5) two years later. White was drafted by the Detroit Lions in the fourth round (85th overall) of the 1988 NFL draft.

== Professional career ==
Pre-draft measurables
Height	Weight	Hand span	40-yard dash	10-yard split	20-yard split	20-yard shuttle	Vertical jump	Broad jump	Bench press
5 ft 9 3/4 in (1.77 m)	189 lb (86 kg)	9 1/2 in (0.24 m)	4.57 s	1.60 s	2.68 s	4.22 s	33.0 in (0.84 m)	9 ft 3 in (2.82 m)	11 reps
All values from NFL Combine

White made his NFL debut with the Lions on September 4, 1988, at the age of 22, in a 31–17 win against the Atlanta Falcons. He played in 16 games during his rookie season and recorded 16 tackles. He became part of the Lions starting lineup the following year, when he was tied for the second-most fumble return touchdowns and eighth-most non-offensive touchdowns (one apiece) in the league. During the 1990 season, White finished third in the NFL in interception return yards (120), tied-fourth in interceptions returned for touchdown (1), eighth in non-offensive touchdowns (1), and tied-tenth in interceptions (5). He started all 16 games in the regular season from 1990 to 1993. He ultimately started 79 of 95 games in his six seasons with the Lions and recorded 450 tackles with 13 interceptions, before being traded to the Kansas City Chiefs on July 12, 1994, in exchange for Reggie Brown.

In his first season with the Chiefs, White played 15 games (14 starts) and recorded 60 tackles. However, he was limited to just 7 starts over the next two seasons. After the 1996 season, he became an unrestricted free agent and subsequently signed a two-year contract with the Falcons in March of the following year. He started all 32 games during his two seasons with the franchise, and finished tied-second in the league in fumble return touchdowns (1) in 1998. He intercepted two passes during that year's NFC divisional playoffs. The Falcons went on to reach the Super Bowl XXXIII, losing to the Denver Broncos despite White making a team-high nine tackles in the championship game, which was the final game of his 11-year career in the NFL.

== Personal life ==
White was married to Nikol until his death. He had three children: William Jr., Brendon, and Brea. Brendon also played for Ohio State and was named defensive most valuable player of the 2019 Rose Bowl.

After retiring from professional football, White returned to Ohio and worked as an engineer. He was diagnosed with amyotrophic lateral sclerosis (ALS) in 2016. Two years later, he was part of the inaugural class inducted into the Lima Senior High School Athletic Hall of Fame. His alma mater also retired his uniform number. White died of ALS on July 28, 2022, at the age of 56.
