= Bob Gagliano =

American football player (born 1958)

No. 10, 11, 14, 16
- Position: Quarterback

Personal information
- Born: September 5, 1958 (age 68); Los Angeles, California, U.S.
- Listed height: 6 ft 3 in (1.91 m)
- Listed weight: 205 lb (93 kg)

Career information
- High school: Hoover (Glendale, California)
- College: Utah State
- NFL draft: 1981: 12th round, 319th overall pick

Career history
- Kansas City Chiefs (1981–1983); Denver Gold (1984–1985); San Francisco 49ers (1986–1987); Tampa Bay Buccaneers (1988)*; Houston Oilers (1988); Indianapolis Colts (1988); Detroit Lions (1989–1990); San Diego Chargers (1991–1992); Atlanta Falcons (1993); San Francisco 49ers (1995)*
- * Offseason or practice squad member only

Career NFL statistics
- Passing attempts: 486
- Passing completions: 249
- Completion percentage: 51.2%
- TD–INT: 17–27
- Passing yards: 3,431
- Passer rating: 62.7
- Stats at Pro Football Reference

Robert Frank Gagliano (born September 5, 1958) is an American former professional football player who was a quarterback in the National Football League (NFL) and the United States Football League (USFL). Gagliano began his career playing for Hoover High School in Glendale, California, then continued playing for Glendale Community College. He then played for United States International University in San Diego before transferring to Utah State University.

== Professional Football ==
Gagliano was selected 319th overall by the Kansas City Chiefs in the 12th round of the 1981 NFL draft. Gagliano appeared in two games over three seasons for the Chiefs, attempting and completing just one pass for seven yards.

After being released by Kansas City in 1984, Gagliano signed with the USFL's Denver Gold. In 1985, he took over as the full-time starting quarterback and had his most productive season as a professional, throwing for 2,695 yards and 13 touchdowns with 17 interceptions while leading the Gold to the playoffs.

Following the USFL's collapse, Gagliano was signed by the San Francisco 49ers in 1986 but did not see action during his first season. In 1987, he was released by the team before the regular season, but was re-signed as a replacement player after the NFLPA went on strike. In his only career start for the 49ers, Gagliano helped lead them to a 41–21 victory over the replacement New York Giants on Monday Night Football. The next week, he relinquished the starting quarterback position to veteran Joe Montana, who led other regular players who crossed the picket line. Gagliano relieved Montana during the game and threw for 79 yards and a TD in the 49ers' 25–17 win.

After spending 1988 on the rosters of three different teams (Tampa Bay, Houston, Indianapolis), he was signed by the Detroit Lions in 1989. He appeared in 11 games, starting seven and led the Lions to five consecutive victories to close out the season. The following season, he started four out of the nine games he played in. It was during his two years in Detroit that he was first pegged with the nickname "the Goose". Gagliano spent 1991 and 1992 with the San Diego Chargers, playing in seven games with one start. In 1994, rookie Perry Klein beat him out for the No. 3 quarterback slot with the Atlanta Falcons.

== Personal life ==
Following his pro football career, Gagliano became an insurance executive but continued his involvement in the sport by conducting youth football camps. In 1999, Gagliano was hired as a technical consultant for The Replacements, a 2000 film that depicted a fictional pro football team. Gagliano served as a personal tutor for actor Keanu Reeves, teaching him how to believably play the quarterback position.
