= Ken Dallafior =

American football player (born 1959)

No. 78, 61, 67
- Positions: Tackle, guard, center

Personal information
- Born: August 26, 1959 (age 67); Royal Oak, Michigan, U.S
- Listed height: 6 ft 4 in (1.93 m)
- Listed weight: 274 lb (124 kg)

Career information
- High school: Madison (Madison Heights, Michigan)
- College: Minnesota
- NFL draft: 1982: 5th round, 124th overall pick

Career history
- Pittsburgh Steelers (1982)*; Michigan Panthers (1984); San Diego Chargers (1985–1988); Detroit Lions (1989–1992)
- * Offseason or practice squad member only

Awards and highlights
- Second-team All-American (1981); First-team All-Big Ten (1981)

Career NFL statistics
- Games played: 87
- Games started: 57
- Fumble recoveries: 3
- Stats at Pro Football Reference

Kenneth Ray Dallafior (born August 26, 1959) is an American former professional football player who was an offensive tackle for eight seasons in the National Football League (NFL). He also played for Michigan Panthers of the USFL in 1984. He played college football for the Minnesota Golden Gophers.
