= Keith Jones (Atlanta Falcons) =

American football player (born 1966)

No. 38
- Position: Running back

Personal information
- Born: March 20, 1966 (age 60); Rock Hill, Missouri, U.S.
- Listed height: 6 ft 1 in (1.85 m)
- Listed weight: 210 lb (95 kg)

Career information
- High school: Webster Groves (Webster Groves, Missouri)
- College: Illinois
- NFL draft: 1989: 3rd round, 62nd overall pick

Career history
- Atlanta Falcons (1989–1992)

Awards and highlights
- Second-team All-Big Ten (1988)

Career NFL statistics
- Rushing yards: 791
- Rushing average: 3.7
- Rushing touchdowns: 6
- Stats at Pro Football Reference

Keith Lamar Jones (born March 20, 1966) is an American former professional football player who was a running back for four seasons with the Atlanta Falcons of the National Football League (NFL) from 1989 to 1992. He played college football for the Illinois Fighting Illini. He was selected by the Falcons in the third round of the 1989 NFL draft.
