= John Ford (wide receiver) =

American football player (born 1966)

No. 80
- Position: Wide receiver

Personal information
- Born: July 31, 1966 (age 60); Belle Glade, Florida, U.S.
- Listed height: 6 ft 2 in (1.88 m)
- Listed weight: 204 lb (93 kg)

Career information
- High school: Glades Central (Belle Glade)
- College: Virginia
- NFL draft: 1989: 2nd round, 30th overall pick

Career history
- Detroit Lions (1989); Seattle Seahawks (1990–1991)*
- * Offseason or practice squad member only

Awards and highlights
- ACC Rookie of the Year (1984); First-team All-ACC (1987)

Career NFL statistics
- Receptions: 5
- Receiving yards: 56
- Stats at Pro Football Reference

John Allen Ford (born July 31, 1966) is an American former professional football player who was a wide receiver for the Detroit Lions of the National Football League (NFL). He played college football for the Virginia Cavaliers and was selected in the second round of the 1989 NFL draft by the Lions with the 30th overall pick.
