= Stacey Mobley =

American football player (born 1965)

No. 81, 83
- Position: Wide receiver

Personal information
- Born: September 15, 1965 (age 61); Daytona Beach, Florida, U.S.
- Listed height: 5 ft 8 in (1.73 m)
- Listed weight: 168 lb (76 kg)

Career information
- High school: Port Orange (FL) Spruce Creek
- College: Jackson State
- NFL draft: 1987: undrafted

Career history
- Los Angeles Rams (1987); Atlanta Falcons (1988)*; Detroit Lions (1989); Green Bay Packers (1990)*; Birmingham Fire (1991)
- * Offseason or practice squad member only

Career NFL statistics
- Receptions: 21
- Receiving yards: 265
- Touchdowns: 1
- Stats at Pro Football Reference

Stacey Mobley (born September 15, 1965) is an American former professional football player who was a wide receiver in the National Football League (NFL). He played college football for the Jackson State Tigers. He played in the NFL for the Los Angeles Rams in 1987 and Detroit Lions in 1989.
