= Eric Andolsek =

American football player (1966–1992)

No. 65
- Position: Offensive guard

Personal information
- Born: August 22, 1966; Thibodaux, Louisiana, U.S.
- Died: June 23, 1992 (aged 25); Thibodaux, Louisiana, U.S.
- Listed height: 6 ft 2 in (1.88 m)
- Listed weight: 290 lb (132 kg)

Career information
- High school: Thibodaux
- College: LSU
- NFL draft: 1988: 5th round, 111th overall pick

Career history
- Detroit Lions (1988–1991)

Awards and highlights
- Third-team All-American (1987); 2× First-team All-SEC (1986, 1987); Freshman All-American (1984)

Career NFL statistics
- Games played: 61
- Games started: 48
- Fumble recoveries: 1
- Stats at Pro Football Reference

Eric Thomas Andolsek (August 22, 1966 – June 23, 1992) was an American professional football player who was an offensive lineman for the Detroit Lions in the National Football League (NFL). He played college football for the LSU Tigers.

== College career ==
Andolsek was born and raised in Thibodaux, Louisiana. He was a star offensive and defensive player at Thibodaux High School from 1981 to 1983. From high school, he went to LSU as an offensive lineman. He played at Louisiana State University from 1984 to 1987. Andolsek was named a Freshman All-American by Football News in 1984. He was also a member of the All-SEC team in 1986 and 1987, and was named a third-team All-American by Football News in 1986. LSU named Andolsek a team captain during the 1986 and 1987 seasons. He was later named to the Athlon Sports All-Time LSU team.

== Professional career ==
Andolsek was selected by the Detroit Lions in the fifth round of the 1988 NFL draft. He saw some action his rookie season, and became a starter at left guard in his second season. For the next three years, Andolsek remained a starter for the Lions, blocking for future Pro Football Hall of Fame running back Barry Sanders.

In his final season, the Lions finished 12–4 and made it all the way to the NFC Championship Game. However, the championship game was Andolsek's last football game.

== Death ==
During the off-season, Andolsek was working in the yard of his Thibodaux home when the driver of a semi-trailer truck ran off the highway in front of his house and struck and killed him. An investigation found the driver had taken his eyes off the road.

Andolsek's number has been retired by Thibodaux High School. In addition, LSU has awarded its outstanding senior in spring practice the Eric Andolsek Award, a recreational facility in Thibodaux bears his name, and the Detroit Lions have named its outstanding offensive lineman award after him. His family has also created a charitable foundation in his honor.

== See also ==
- List of American football players who died during their career
