= 1991 Detroit Lions season =

NFL team season

- Owner: William Clay Ford Sr.
- General manager: Chuck Schmidt
- Head coach: Wayne Fontes
- Offensive coordinator: Dave Levy
- Defensive coordinator: Woody Widenhofer
- Home stadium: Pontiac Silverdome

Results
- Record: 12–4
- Division place: 1st NFC Central
- Playoffs: Won Divisional Playoffs (vs. Cowboys) 38–6; Lost NFC Championship (at Redskins) 10–41
- All-Pros: 5: RB Barry Sanders (1st team); DT Jerry Ball (1st team); ILB Chris Spielman (1st team); KR Mel Gray (1st team); OT Lomas Brown (2nd team)
- Pro Bowlers: 5: RB Barry Sanders; OT Lomas Brown; ILB Chris Spielman; FS Bennie Blades; KR Mel Gray

The 1991 Detroit Lions season was the franchise's 62nd season in the National Football League, their 58th as the Detroit Lions. It stands as one of the team's best seasons since the NFL-AFL merger in 1970, and the first time the Lions made it to the NFC Championship Game.

The team finished 12–4, setting a new franchise record for wins in a season. They won the NFC Central, their first division title and playoff appearance since 1983; it also marked the team's first winning season since 1983. The Lions finished the season undefeated in the Pontiac Silverdome, including their first home playoff game since winning their last NFL title in 1957. The team did not lose a game at an indoor facility the entire season, having made visits to Indianapolis and Minnesota during the year.

This season also saw the Lions debut of wide receiver Herman Moore, the team's 1991 first-round draft pick who went on to set records as part of an explosive passing offense later in the decade.

The 1991 season was the last season that saw the Lions sweep the Green Bay Packers until 2017 and was also the last time the Lions would win at Lambeau Field until 2015.

This was the first season since 1957 in which the Lions won a playoff game, and their last until 2023.

The last remaining active members of the 1991 Detroit Lions were Rodney Peete and Kelvin Pritchett, who both played their final NFL games in the 2004 season, although Peete was absent in 2000.

== The season ==
Statistics site Football Outsiders summed up Detroit's season thus: "The Lions were one of the most inconsistent teams of the year, which is what happens when you win 12 games but lose 45–0 (to Washington) and 35–3 (to San Francisco). Otherwise, it's a little hard to tell why they ended up only 17th in [efficiency]. The Lions didn't have too many super-close victories, but did go 4–0 in games decided by a touchdown or less. They didn't particularly take advantage of long plays ... with only four gains of 50 yards or more. They did benefit a little extra from fumbles on defense, recovering 15 of 23. They also benefitted from poor opponent special teams...."

Detroit, according to Football Outsiders, had "a bit of an odd schedule; on the surface, it doesn't look like Detroit's schedule of opposing run defenses was that easy. The Lions missed the [league-leading] Eagles, but they did have to play six games against the teams ranked sixth through ninth in run defense [efficiency]: San Francisco, Chicago, Washington, and Green Bay. Except running back Barry Sanders didn't play against Washington in Week 1, and he had only seven carries against San Francisco in Week 8. His two highest-carry games came against the two worst run defenses in the league, Miami and Indianapolis."

== Season summary ==
The Lions were plagued by injuries most of the season. Wide receiver Aubrey Matthews was lost for the season to a knee injury on a meaningless final play during a 45-0 loss to the Washington Redskins during Week 1. Starting quarterback Rodney Peete was lost for the season in the 9th game of the year, a 34–10 victory over the Dallas Cowboys. Second string quarterback Erik Kramer, who had won the backup quarterback job from Andre Ware (the team's #1 draft pick from the season before) during training camp, guided the team the rest of the way. Although Peete's injury was serious, the most devastating injury was the career-ending injury that befell guard Mike Utley in a Week 12 game against the Los Angeles Rams. Utley suffered a severe injury to two of his cervical vertebrae, rendering him paralyzed from the chest down and ending his career. Unaware of this, Utley gave a thumbs-up gesture to the crowd as he was being wheeled from the field. For the rest of the season, Lions players wore a decal with Utley's number 60 on their helmets to honor their fallen teammate.

Utley's injury gave inspiration to a team that at that point in the season was struggling, and the team won its last six games to steal the division title away from the Chicago Bears, whose Week 17 loss to the San Francisco 49ers sealed their first division title since 1983. The Lions earned a bye into the divisional round where they once again faced the Cowboys, who had beaten the Bears the week before to get their first playoff win since 1982. The two teams met in the postseason for the first time since 1970 when Dallas won 5-0.

Although the Cowboys held the Lions' star running back Barry Sanders in check for most of the game, Kramer threw for 341 yards and three touchdowns and Sanders closed the scoring with an electrifying 47-yard touchdown run for a 38–6 victory. It was the Lions' first postseason victory since they won their last league championship in 1957. And their last postseason victory until January 14, 2024.

The win earned the Lions a return trip to Washington for the NFC Championship Game and a chance to avenge the 45–0 defeat in the season opener. The Redskins jumped to an early 10–0 lead when Kramer was sacked and fumbled on the Lions' first possession, then was intercepted on the second. The Lions fought back with a touchdown pass to receiver Willie Green and a field goal by kicker Eddie Murray in the second quarter to stay within one score at the half. The Lions trailed 17–10 at the break, but failed to score again as Washington scored 24 points in the second half to put the game away. Ware replaced Kramer as quarterback in the fourth quarter. He promptly threw an interception which was returned by Darrell Green for the game's final touchdown. The 1991 Lions' season thus ended the way it started, with a loss to the Redskins at RFK Stadium; getting outscored 86-10 in the two games.

The Lions finished the season with a 9–0 record at home, counting their playoff win. The team did not play particularly well on the road: outside of their wins at Indianapolis and Minnesota, their only other outdoor wins came against the Green Bay Packers in Week 16, and the eventual AFC Champion Buffalo Bills in Week 17; the margin of victory in those games were four and three points respectively and the Lions gave up 30 or more points in three of their four road losses, two of which came to teams that failed to qualify for the playoffs (San Francisco 49ers, Tampa Bay Buccaneers).

The Lions road win against the Packers in Week 16 of the season stood as their last until 2015, the Lions owned a 25-game road losing streak in Wisconsin.

== Offseason ==
=== NFL draft ===
1991 Detroit Lions draft
Round	Pick	Player	Position	College	Notes
1	10	Herman Moore *	Wide receiver	Virginia	
3	58	Reggie Barrett	Wide receiver	Texas-El Paso	
4	91	Kevin Scott	Cornerback	Stanford	
5	118	Scott Conover	Offensive tackle	Purdue	
6	151	Richie Andrews	Kicker	Florida State	
7	178	Franklin Thomas	Tight end	Grambling State	
8	205	Cedric Jackson	Running back	TCU	
9	231	Darryl Milburn	Defensive end	Grambling State	
11	285	Slip Watkins	Wide receiver	LSU	
12	318	Zeno Alexander	Linebacker	Arizona	
Made roster † Pro Football Hall of Fame * Made at least one Pro Bowl during career

=== Undrafted free agents ===
1991 undrafted free agents of note
Player	Position	College
Greg Jones	Quarterback	West Virginia
Greg Patrick	Safety	Brown
Claude Pettaway	Safety	Maine
Kerry Valerie	Safety	Southern Miss

== Personnel ==
=== Staff ===
1991 Detroit Lions staff
Front office: Owner and president – William Clay Ford Sr.; Executive vice president and chief operating officer – Chuck Schmidt; Treasurer – William Clay Ford Jr.; Director of player personnel – Ron Hughes; Director of pro scouting – Kevin Colbert; Head coaches: Head coach – Wayne Fontes; Offensive coaches: Offensive coordinator – Dave Levy; Quarterbacks – Raymond Berry; Running backs – Billie Matthews; Receivers – Charlie Sanders; Offensive line – Jerry Wampfler	Defensive coaches: Defensive coordinator/outside linebackers – Woody Widenhofer; Defensive line – Lamar Leachman; Inside linebackers – Herb Paterra; Defensive backs – Len Fontes; Defensive assistant – Don Clemons; Special teams coaches: Special teams – Frank Gansz; Strength and conditioning: Strength and conditioning/defensive assistant – Bert Hill

=== Roster ===
1991 Detroit Lions roster
Quarterbacks (QB): 12 Erik Kramer; 16 Chuck Long; 11 Andre Ware; Running backs (RB): 42 D. J. Dozier; 23 Mel Gray; 33 Don Overton; 20 Barry Sanders; Wide receivers (WR): 87 Jeff Campbell WR; 82 Robert Clark; 81 Mike Farr; 86 Willie Green; 84 Herman Moore; 80 Brett Perriman; Tight ends (TE): 48 Roman Fortin; 89 David Little LS; 46 Derek Tennell	Offensive linemen (OL): 65 Eric Andolsek G; 66 Shawn Bouwens G; 75 Lomas Brown T; 76 Scott Conover T; 67 Ken Dallafior G; 53 Kevin Glover C; 77 Bubba Paris T; Defensive linemen (DL): 90 Dan Owens DE; 97 Jeff Hunter DE; 79 Darryl Milburn DE; 96 Lawrence Pete NT; 94 Kelvin Pritchett DE; 92 Marc Spindler DE	Linebackers (LB): 59 Anthony Bell OLB; 50 Toby Caston ILB; 98 Dennis Gibson ILB; 99 Tracy Hayworth OLB; 58 George Jamison OLB; 57 Victor Jones ILB; 51 Niko Noga ILB; 54 Chris Spielman ILB; Defensive backs (DB): 32 Bruce Alexander CB; 36 Bennie Blades FS; 39 Ray Crockett CB; 24 Melvin Jenkins CB; 38 Kevin Scott CB; 21 Terry Taylor CB; 25 Sheldon White CB; 35 William White SS; Special teams (ST): 6 Jim Arnold P; 3 Eddie Murray K	Practice squad: -- James Goode LB; 14 Greg Jones QB; 43 Darrell Wallace RB/WR; -- Chuck Weatherspoon RB; Reserve: 93 Jerry Ball NT (IR); 40 Reggie Barrett WR (IR); 55 Mike Cofer LB (IR); 30 Cedric Jackson RB (IR); 83 Aubrey Matthews WR (IR); 9 Rodney Peete QB (IR); 64 Eric Sanders T (IR); 60 Mike Utley G (IR); 26 Sean Vanhorse CB (IR); 27 Herb Welch S (IR); Rookies in italics 47 active, 10 reserve, 4 practice squad

== Preseason ==
Week	Date	Opponent	Result	Record	Venue	Attendance
1	July 27	vs. Denver Broncos	W 14–3	1–0	Fawcett Stadium	23,815
2	August 2	Cincinnati Bengals	W 24–20	2–0	Pontiac Silverdome	47,899
3	August 10	at Buffalo Bills	L 16–21	2–1	Rich Stadium	51,813
4	August 17	at Kansas City Chiefs	L 14–38	2–2	Arrowhead Stadium	57,320
5	August 23	Pittsburgh Steelers	L 3–16	2–3	Pontiac Silverdome	53,807

== Regular season ==
=== Schedule ===
Week	Date	Opponent	Result	Record	Venue	Attendance
1	September 1	at Washington Redskins	**L** 0–45	0–1	Robert F. Kennedy Memorial Stadium	52,958
2	September 8	**Green Bay Packers**	**W** 23–14	1–1	Pontiac Silverdome	43,132
3	September 15	Miami Dolphins	**W** 17–13	2–1	Pontiac Silverdome	56,896
4	September 22	at Indianapolis Colts	**W** 33–24	3–1	Hoosier Dome	53,396
5	September 29	**Tampa Bay Buccaneers**	**W** 31–3	4–1	Pontiac Silverdome	44,479
6	October 6	**Minnesota Vikings**	**W** 24–20	5–1	Pontiac Silverdome	63,423
7	Bye					
8	October 20	at San Francisco 49ers	**L** 3–35	5–2	Candlestick Park	61,240
9	October 27	Dallas Cowboys	**W** 34–10	6–2	Pontiac Silverdome	74,906
10	November 3	at **Chicago Bears**	**L** 10–20	6–3	Soldier Field	57,281
11	November 10	at **Tampa Bay Buccaneers**	**L** 21–30	6–4	Tampa Stadium	37,742
12	November 17	Los Angeles Rams	**W** 21–10	7–4	Pontiac Silverdome	60,873
13	November 24	at **Minnesota Vikings**	**W** 34–14	8–4	Metrodome	51,644
14	November 28	**Chicago Bears**	**W** 16–6	9–4	Pontiac Silverdome	78,879
15	December 8	New York Jets	**W** 34–20	10–4	Pontiac Silverdome	69,304
16	December 15	at **Green Bay Packers**	**W** 21–17	11–4	Lambeau Field	43,881
17	December 22	at Buffalo Bills	**W** 17–14 (OT)	12–4	Rich Stadium	78,059
Note: Intra-division opponents are in **bold** text.

=== Game summaries ===
==== Week 1: at Washington Redskins ====
Week One: Detroit Lions at Washington Redskins – Game summary

Quarter	1	2	3	4	Total
Lions	0	0	0	0	**0**
**Redskins**	21	14	7	3	**45**

at Robert F. Kennedy Memorial Stadium, Washington, D.C.

- Date: September 1
- Game time: 8:05 p.m. EDT
- Game weather: 76 °F (24 °C)
- Game attendance: 52,958
- Referee: Gordon McCarter
- TV announcers (TNT): Skip Caray and Pat Haden
- Box score

Game information

**First quarter**

- WAS – Gerald Riggs 1-yard run (Chip Lohmiller kick). Redskins 7–0.
- WAS – Jimmie Johnson 4-yard pass from Mark Rypien (Chip Lohmiller kick). Redskins 14–0.
- WAS – Brian Mitchell 69-yard punt return (Chip Lohmiller kick). Redskins 21–0.

**Second quarter**

- WAS – Ricky Sanders 18-yard pass from Earnest Byner (Chip Lohmiller kick). Redskins 28–0.
- WAS – Earnest Byner 6-yard run (Chip Lohmiller kick). Redskins 35–0.

**Third quarter**

- WAS – Gary Clark 38-yard pass from Mark Rypien (Chip Lohmiller kick). Redskins 42–0.

**Fourth quarter**

- WAS – Chip Lohmiller 26-yard field goal. Redskins 45–0.

**Top passers**

- DET – Rodney Peete – 8/22, 75 yards, 3 INT
- WAS – Mark Rypien – 15/19, 183 yards, 2 TD, INT

**Top rushers**

- DET – Cedric Jackson – 10 rushes, 39 yards
- WAS – Earnest Byner – 16 rushes, 83 yards, TD

**Top receivers**

- DET – Don Overton – 4 receptions, 38 yards
- WAS – Gary Clark – 6 receptions, 107 yards, TD

==== Week 2: vs. Green Bay Packers ====
Week Two: Green Bay Packers at Detroit Lions – Game summary

Quarter	1	2	3	4	Total
Packers	0	7	7	0	**14**
**Lions**	7	3	10	3	**23**

at Pontiac Silverdome, Pontiac, Michigan

- Date: September 8
- Game time: 1:00 p.m. EDT
- Game weather: None (played indoors)
- Game attendance: 43,132
- Referee: Howard Roe
- TV announcers (CBS): Sean McDonough and Irv Cross
- Box score

Game information

**First quarter**

- DET – Barry Sanders 4-yard run (Eddie Murray kick). Lions 7–0.

**Second quarter**

- GB – Vince Workman 1-yard run (Chris Jacke kick). Tied 7–7.
- DET – Eddie Murray 41-yard field goal. Lions 10–7.

**Third quarter**

- DET – Willie Green 12-yard pass from Rodney Peete (Eddie Murray kick). Lions 17–7.
- DET – Eddie Murray 27-yard field goal. Lions 20–7.
- GB – Don Majkowski 2-yard run (Chris Jacke kick). Lions 20–14.

**Fourth quarter**

- DET – Eddie Murray 36-yard field goal. Lions 23–14.

**Top passers**

- GB – Don Majkowski – 20/28, 185 yards, INT
- DET – Rodney Peete – 25/38, 271 yards, TD

**Top rushers**

- GB – Darrell Thompson – 14 rushes, 45 yards
- DET – Barry Sanders – 18 rushes, 42 yards, TD

**Top receivers**

- GB – Perry Kemp – 8 receptions, 66 yards
- DET – Robert Clark – 10 receptions, 143 yards

==== Week 3: vs. Miami Dolphins ====
Week Three: Miami Dolphins at Detroit Lions – Game summary

Quarter	1	2	3	4	Total
Dolphins	3	7	0	3	**13**
**Lions**	3	7	7	0	**17**

at Pontiac Silverdome, Pontiac, Michigan

- Date: September 15
- Game time: 1:00 p.m. EDT
- Game weather: None (played indoors)
- Game attendance: 56,896
- Referee: Stan Kemp
- TV announcers (NBC): Charlie Jones and Todd Christensen
- Box score

Game information

**First quarter**

- DET – Eddie Murray 46-yard field goal. Lions 3–0.
- MIA – Pete Stoyanovich 18-yard field goal. Tied 3–3.

**Second quarter**

- MIA – Mark Higgs 4-yard run (Pete Stoyanovich kick). Dolphins 10–3.
- DET – Willie Green 26-yard pass from Rodney Peete (Eddie Murray kick). Tied 10–10.

**Third quarter**

- DET – Rodney Peete 6-yard run (Eddie Murray kick). Lions 17–10.

**Fourth quarter**

- MIA – Pete Stoyanovich 47-yard field goal. Lions 17–13.

**Top passers**

- MIA – Dan Marino – 16/34, 174 yards
- DET – Rodney Peete – 13/24, 173 yards, TD, INT

**Top rushers**

- MIA – Mark Higgs – 19 rushes, 71 yards, TD
- DET – Barry Sanders – 32 rushes, 143 yards

**Top receivers**

- MIA – Mark Clayton – 4 receptions, 56 yards
- DET – Robert Clark – 5 receptions, 57 yards

==== Week 4: at Indianapolis Colts ====
Week Four: Detroit Lions at Indianapolis Colts – Game summary

Quarter	1	2	3	4	Total
**Lions**	0	7	16	10	**33**
Colts	10	0	0	14	**24**

at Hoosier Dome, Indianapolis, Indiana

- Date: September 22
- Game time: 1:00 p.m. EDT
- Game weather: None (played indoors)
- Game attendance: 53,396
- Referee: Pat Haggerty
- TV: CBS
- Box score

==== Week 5: vs. Tampa Bay Buccaneers ====
Week Five: Tampa Bay Buccaneers at Detroit Lions – Game summary

Quarter	1	2	3	4	Total
Buccanners	0	3	0	0	**3**
**Lions**	14	7	0	10	**31**

at Pontiac Silverdome, Pontiac, Michigan

- Date: September 29
- Game time: 1:00 p.m. EDT
- Game weather: None (played indoors)
- Game attendance: 53,396
- Referee: Dale Hamer
- TV: CBS
- Box score

==== Week 6: vs. Minnesota Vikings ====
Week Six: Minnesota Vikings at Detroit Lions – Game summary

Quarter	1	2	3	4	Total
Vikings	7	7	3	3	**20**
**Lions**	0	3	0	21	**24**

at Pontiac Silverdome, Pontiac, Michigan

- Date: October 6
- Game time: 1:00 p.m. EDT
- Game weather: None (played indoors)
- Game attendance: 63,423
- Referee: Dick Hantak
- TV: CBS
- Box score

==== Week 8: at San Francisco 49ers ====
Week Eight: Detroit Lions at San Francisco 49ers – Game summary

Quarter	1	2	3	4	Total
Lions	0	3	0	0	**3**
**49ers**	0	21	14	0	**35**

at Candlestick Park, San Francisco, California

- Date: October 20
- Game time: 4:00 p.m. EDT/1:00 p.m. PDT
- Game weather: 69 °F (21 °C)
- Game attendance: 61,240
- Referee: Howard Roe
- TV announcers (CBS): Pat Summerall and John Madden
- Box score

==== Week 9: vs. Dallas Cowboys ====
Week Nine: Dallas Cowboys at Detroit Lions – Game summary

Quarter	1	2	3	4	Total
Cowboys	0	10	0	0	**10**
**Lions**	3	7	10	14	**34**

at Pontiac Silverdome, Pontiac, Michigan

- Date: October 27
- Game time: 4:00 p.m. EST
- Game weather: None (played indoors)
- Game attendance: 74,906
- Referee: Johnny Grier
- TV announcers (CBS): Verne Lundquist and Dan Fouts
- Box score

==== Week 10: at Chicago Bears ====
Week Ten: Detroit Lions at Chicago Bears – Game summary

Quarter	1	2	3	4	Total
Lions	0	10	0	0	**10**
**Bears**	3	0	10	7	**20**

at Soldier Field, Chicago, Illinois

- Date: November 3
- Game time: 1:00 p.m. EST/12:00 p.m. CST
- Game weather: 18 °F (−8 °C)
- Game attendance: 57,281
- Referee: Bob McElwee
- TV announcers (CBS): Pat Summerall and John Madden
- Box score

==== Week 11: at Tampa Bay Buccaneers ====
Week Eleven: Detroit Lions at Tampa Bay Buccaneers – Game summary

Quarter	1	2	3	4	Total
Lions	7	0	7	7	**21**
**Buccaneers**	7	16	7	0	**30**

at Tampa Stadium, Tampa, Florida

- Date: November 10
- Game time: 1:00 p.m. EST
- Game weather: 51 °F (11 °C)
- Game attendance: 37,742
- Referee: Tom White
- TV announcers (CBS): Sean McDonough and Hank Stram
- Box score

==== Week 12: vs. Los Angeles Rams ====
Week Twelve: Los Angeles Rams at Detroit Lions – Game summary

Quarter	1	2	3	4	Total
Rams	3	0	7	0	**10**
**Lions**	0	7	0	14	**21**

at Pontiac Silverdome, Pontiac, Michigan

- Date: November 17
- Game time: 4:00 p.m. EST
- Game weather: None (played indoors)
- Game attendance: 60,873
- Referee: Bernie Kukar
- TV announcers (CBS): Verne Lundquist and Dan Fouts
- Box score

This was the game that Lions guard Mike Utley suffered a career ending spinal injury. While he was carted off the field, he gives the Lions a "thumbs up".

==== Week 13: at Minnesota Vikings ====
Week Thirteen: Detroit Lions at Minnesota Vikings – Game summary

Quarter	1	2	3	4	Total
**Lions**	7	3	14	10	**34**
Vikings	0	7	0	7	**14**

at Hubert H. Humphrey Metrodome, Minneapolis, Minnesota

- Date: November 24
- Game time: 1:00 p.m. EST/12:00 p.m. CST
- Game weather: None (played indoors)
- Game attendance: 51,644
- Referee: Tom Dooley
- TV announcers (CBS): James Brown and Randy Cross
- Box score

==== Week 14: vs. Chicago Bears ====
Week Fourteen: Chicago Bears at Detroit Lions – Game summary

Quarter	1	2	3	4	Total
Bears	0	6	0	0	**6**
**Lions**	10	0	3	3	**16**

at Pontiac Silverdome, Pontiac, Michigan

- Date: November 28
- Game time: 12:30 p.m. EST
- Game weather: None (played indoors)
- Game attendance: 78,879
- Referee: Dale Hamer
- TV announcers (CBS): Pat Summerall and John Madden
- Box score

==== Week 15: vs. New York Jets ====
Week Fifteen: New York Jets at Detroit Lions – Game summary

Quarter	1	2	3	4	Total
Jets	14	0	3	3	**20**
**Lions**	14	10	10	0	**34**

at Pontiac Silverdome, Pontiac, Michigan

- Date: December 8
- Game time: 4:00 p.m. EST
- Game weather: None (played indoors)
- Game attendance: 69,304
- Referee: Red Cashion
- TV announcers (NBC): Marv Albert and Paul Maguire
- Box score

==== Week 16: at Green Bay Packers ====
Week Sixteen: Detroit Lions at Green Bay Packers – Game summary

Quarter	1	2	3	4	Total
**Lions**	7	0	0	14	**21**
Packers	7	3	0	7	**17**

at Lambeau Field, Green Bay, Wisconsin

- Date: December 15
- Game time: 1:00 p.m. EST/12:00 p.m. CST
- Game weather: 10 °F (−12 °C)
- Game attendance: 43,881
- Referee: Larry Nemmers
- TV announcers (CBS): James Brown and Randy Cross
- Box score

Game information

**First quarter**

- GB – Vince Workman 30-yard run (Chris Jacke kick). Packers 7–0.
- DET – Robert Clark 19-yard pass from Erik Kramer (Eddie Murray kick). Tied 7–7.

**Second quarter**

- GB – Chris Jacke 23-yard field goal. Packers 10–7.

**Third quarter**

- No scoring plays

**Fourth quarter**

- DET – Robert Clark 3-yard pass from Erik Kramer (Eddie Murray kick). Lions 14–10.
- DET – Mel Gray 78-yard punt return (Eddie Murray kick). Lions 21–10.
- GB – Vince Workman 12-yard pass from Mike Tomczak (Chris Jacke kick). Lions 21–17.

**Top passers**

- DET – Erik Kramer – 14/29, 131 yards, 2 TD
- GB – Mike Tomczak – 18/40, 207 yards, TD, INT

**Top rushers**

- DET – Barry Sanders – 27 rushes, 85 yards
- GB – Darrell Thompson – 15 rushes, 71 yards

**Top receivers**

- DET – Mike Farr – 7 receptions, 59 yards
- GB – Sterling Sharpe – 6 receptions, 83 yards

Erik Kramer led the Detroit Lions to victory with 2 touchdown passes and no turnovers. This was the last time the Lions won in Wisconsin until 2015.

==== Week 17: at Buffalo Bills ====
Week Seventeen: Detroit Lions at Buffalo Bills – Game summary

Quarter	1	2	3	4	OT	Total
**Lions**	0	0	0	14	3	**17**
Bills	0	7	0	7	0	**14**

at Rich Stadium, Orchard Park, New York

- Date: December 22
- Game time: 1:00 p.m. EST
- Game weather: 35 °F (2 °C)
- Game attendance: 78,059
- Referee: Tom White
- TV announcers (CBS): James Brown and Randy Cross
- Box score

Game information

**First quarter**

- No scoring plays

**Second quarter**

- BUF – Andre Reed 7-yard pass from Frank Reich (Scott Norwood kick). Bills 7–0.

**Third quarter**

- No scoring plays

**Fourth quarter**

- DET – Barry Sanders 1-yard run (Eddie Murray kick). Tied 7–7.
- DET – Sheldon White 18-yard interception return (Eddie Murray kick). Lions 14–7.
- BUF – Steve Tasker 20-yard pass from Frank Reich (Scott Norwood kick). Tied 14–14.

**Overtime**

- DET – Eddie Murray 21-yard field goal. Lions 17–14.

**Top passers**

- DET – Erik Kramer – 17/36, 251 yards, 2 INT
- BUF – Frank Reich – 15/25, 166 yards, 2 TD, INT

**Top rushers**

- DET – Barry Sanders – 26 rushes, 108 yards, TD
- BUF – Kenneth Davis – 25 rushes, 118 yards

**Top receivers**

- DET – Robert Clark – 4 receptions, 54 yards
- BUF – Keith McKeller – 2 receptions, 46 yards

=== Standings ===
NFC Central
	W	L	T	PCT	DIV	CONF	PF	PA	STK
^{(2)} Detroit Lions	12	4	0	.750	6–2	8–4	339	295	W6
^{(4)} Chicago Bears	11	5	0	.688	7–1	9–3	299	269	L1
Minnesota Vikings	8	8	0	.500	3–5	8–6	301	306	L1
Green Bay Packers	4	12	0	.250	3–5	3–9	273	313	W1
Tampa Bay Buccaneers	3	13	0	.188	1–7	2–10	199	365	W1

== Playoffs ==
=== NFC Divisional Playoffs: vs. (5) Dallas Cowboys ===
NFC Divisional Playoffs: (5) Dallas Cowboys at (2) Detroit Lions – Game summary

Quarter	1	2	3	4	Total
Cowboys	3	3	0	0	6
Lions	7	10	14	7	38

at Pontiac Silverdome, Pontiac, Michigan

- Date: January 5, 1992
- Game time: 4:00 p.m. EST
- Game weather: None (played indoors)
- Game attendance: 79,835
- Referee: Gordon McCarter
- TV announcers (CBS): Pat Summerall and John Madden
- Box score

Game information

First quarter

- DET – Willie Green 31-yard pass from Erik Kramer (Eddie Murray kick). Lions 7–0.
- DAL – Ken Willis 28-yard field goal. Lions 7–3.

Second quarter

- DET – Mel Jenkins 41-yard interception return (Eddie Murray kick). Lions 14–3.
- DAL – Ken Willis 28-yard field goal. Lions 14–6.
- DET – Eddie Murray 36-yard field goal. Lions 17–6.

Third quarter

- DET – Willie Green 9-yard pass from Erik Kramer (Eddie Murray kick). Lions 24–6.
- DET – Herman Moore 7-yard pass from Erik Kramer (Eddie Murray kick). Lions 31–6.

Fourth quarter

- DET – Barry Sanders 47-yard run (Eddie Murray kick). Lions 38–6.

Top passers

- DAL – Troy Aikman – 11/16, 114 yards, INT
- DET – Erik Kramer – 29/38, 341 yards, 3 TD

Top rushers

- DAL – Emmitt Smith – 15 rushes, 80 yards
- DET – Barry Sanders – 12 rushes, 69 yards, TD

Top receivers

- DAL – Michael Irvin – 5 receptions, 84 yards
- DET – Willie Green – 8 receptions, 115 yards, 2 TD

The Lions entered the 1991-92 NFL playoffs as the NFC's 2 seed behind the #1 seed Washington Redskins. Following wild card weekend where both the home teams lost to the away teams (Chicago to Dallas and New Orleans to Atlanta) the Cowboys were the highest remaining seed and thus earned a trip to the Silverdome to play the Lions. It was the team's first home playoff game in any format since the 1957 championship season, and only the fourth home playoff game in franchise history.

Dallas entered the game with an ongoing quarterback controversy. Incumbent Troy Aikman had gone down with injury earlier in the season. The backup Steve Beuerlein came in and lead the team to the playoffs. Beuerlein had started in the wild card win over Chicago and the Cowboys head coach Jimmy Johnson named him the starter for this game as well. As for the Lions they had to battle quarterback issues of their own. Rodney Peete, Andre Ware, and Erik Kramer all spent time as the Lions quarterback. After Peete went down it was Kramer who emerged as the starter and would start this playoff game as well. Despite not having a franchise quarterback the Lions had a lot to feel good about going into this game. Star running back Barry Sanders, Herman Moore, Brett Perriman, Lomas Brown and Kevin Glover gave them plenty of talent on offense while Chris Spielman, Ray Crockett and Bennie Blades were the stars on defense. The most exciting storyline going into the game was Barry Sanders going up against Cowboys running back Emmitt Smith.

From the very beginning of the game the Lions were dominant. Since the team knew Dallas would focus on stopping Barry Sanders and the run game, Detroit gambled by focusing on Erik Kramer and the pass game instead. Dallas was not ready to defend it. After the Cowboys went 3 and out on their first drive, Kramer drove the Lions downfield and scored on a touchdown pass to Willie Green to take a 7-0 lead. Detroit would never relinquish it. Despite the Lions only putting up another 10 points before halftime, Dallas's offense couldn't find the end zone and only scored two field goals before the end of the second giving Detroit an 11-point lead at halftime and thus Beuerlein's day was over. Johnson inserted Aikman into the game but he wasn't able to pick apart Detroit's defense either and wouldn't even score any points while the Lions continued to steamroll Dallas. Even with the lead Detroit kept allowing Kramer to throw instead of turning to Sanders and it paid off as he completed 29 out of 38 passes for 341 yards and 3 touchdowns helping Detroit to a 38-6 victory. This was the Lions' only playoff win of the Barry Sanders era and their last playoff win until 2024.

=== NFC Championship: at (1) Washington Redskins ===
NFC Championship Game: (2) Detroit Lions at (1) Washington Redskins – Game summary

Quarter	1	2	3	4	Total
Lions	0	10	0	0	10
Redskins	10	7	10	14	41

at Robert F. Kennedy Memorial Stadium, Washington, D.C.

- Date: January 12, 1992
- Game time: 4:00 p.m. EST
- Game weather: Clear, 40 °F (4 °C)
- Game attendance: 55,585
- Referee: Bob McElwee
- TV announcers (CBS): Pat Summerall and John Madden
- Box score

Game information

First quarter

- WAS – Gerald Riggs 2-yard run (Chip Lohmiller kick). Redskins 7–0.
- WAS – Chip Lohmiller 20-yard field goal. Redskins 10–0.

Second quarter

- DET – Willie Green 18-yard pass from Erik Kramer (Eddie Murray kick). Redskins 10–7.
- WAS – Gerald Riggs 3-yard run (Chip Lohmiller kick). Redskins 17–7.
- DET – Eddie Murray 30-yard field goal. Redskins 17–10.

Third quarter

- WAS – Chip Lohmiller 28-yard field goal. Redskins 20–10.
- WAS – Gary Clark 45-yard pass from Mark Rypien (Chip Lohmiller kick). Redskins 27–10.

Fourth quarter

- WAS – Art Monk 21-yard pass from Mark Rypien (Chip Lohmiller kick). Redskins 34–10.
- WAS – Darrell Green 32-yard interception return (Chip Lohmiller kick). Redskins 41–10.

Top passers

- DET – Erik Kramer – 21/33, 249 yards, TD, INT
- WAS – Mark Rypien – 12/17, 228 yards, 2 TD

Top rushers

- DET – Barry Sanders – 11 rushes, 44 yards
- WAS – Earnest Byner – 17 rushes, 62 yards

Top receivers

- DET – Mike Farr – 6 receptions, 73 yards
- WAS – Art Monk – 5 receptions, 94 yards, TD

The Redskins crushed the Lions, 41–10, as quarterback Mark Rypien completed 12 out of 17 passes for 228 yards and 2 touchdowns. Detroit quarterback Erik Kramer was sacked 5 times, three of them by Washington linebacker Wilber Marshall. Lions running back Barry Sanders, who rushed for 1,548 yards during the season, was held to just 44 yards on 11 carries. This was the Lions only appearance in an NFL conference championship game until the 2023-2024 season.

== Awards and honors ==
- Mel Gray, NFL Kickoff Return Leader
- Mel Gray, All Pro
- Barry Sanders, All-Pro
- Barry Sanders, NFC Pro Bowl Selection
- Barry Sanders, Bert Bell Award
- Lomas Brown, Pro Bowl Selection
- Lomas Brown, All Pro
- Jerry Ball, Pro Bowl Selection
- Jerry Ball, All Pro
- Chis Spielman, Pro Bowl Selection
- Chris Spielman, All Pro
- Bennie Blades, Pro Bowl Selection
- Bennie Blades, All Pro
