= List of Detroit Lions starting quarterbacks =

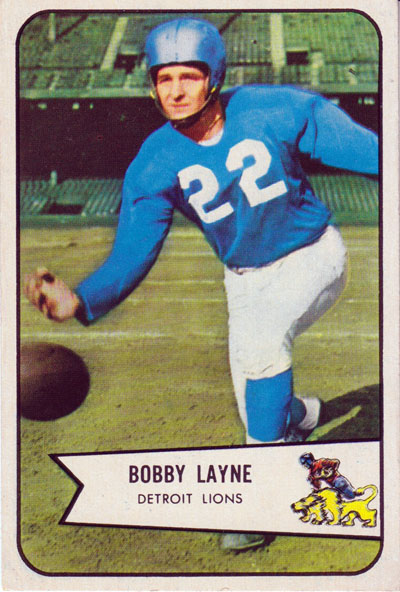
Bobby Layne (1950–1958)

These quarterbacks have started at least one game for the Detroit Lions of the National Football League (NFL). Since the beginning of the 2021 season, their starting quarterback has been Jared Goff.

The early era of the NFL and American football in general was not conducive to passing the football, with the forward pass not being legalized until the early 1900s and not fully adopted for many more years. Although the quarterback position has historically been the one to receive the snap and thus handle the football on every offensive play, the importance of the position during this era was limited by various rules, like having to be five yards behind the line of scrimmage before a forward pass could be attempted. These rules and the tactical focus on rushing the ball limited the importance of the quarterback position while enhancing the value of different types of backs, such as the halfback and the fullback. Some of these backs were considered triple-threat men, capable of rushing, passing or kicking the football, making it common for multiple players to attempt a pass during a game.

As rules changed and the NFL began adopting a more pass-centric approach to offensive football, the importance of the quarterback position grew. Beginning in 1950, total wins and losses by a team's starting quarterback were tracked. Prior to 1950, the Lions had numerous players identified as playing the quarterback position. However, the combination of unreliable statistics in the early era of the NFL and the differences in the early quarterback position make tracking starts by quarterbacks impractical for this timeframe.

== Regular season ==
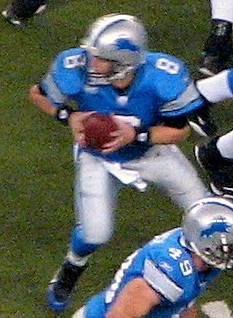
Jon Kitna (2006–2008)

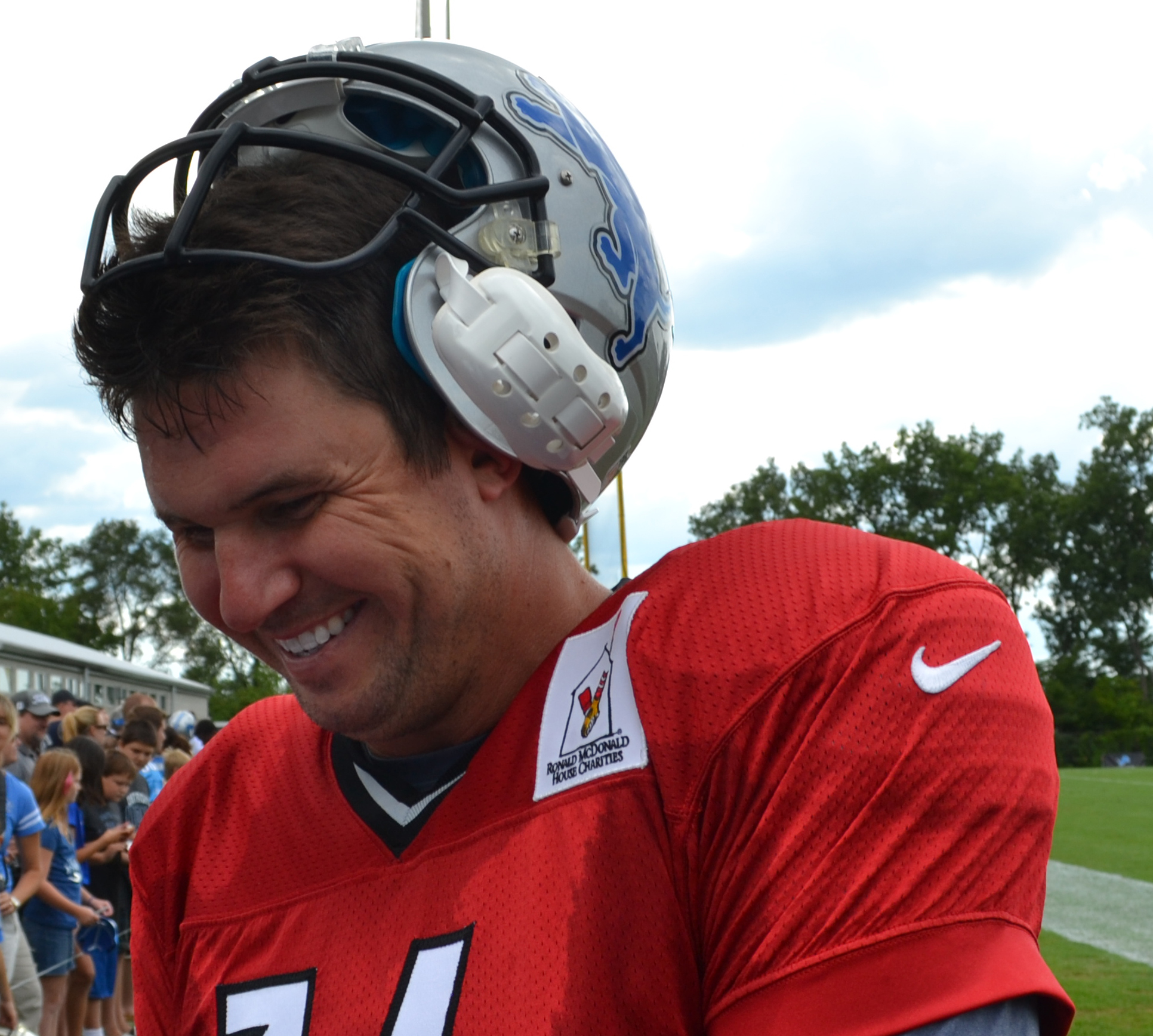
Shaun Hill (2010)

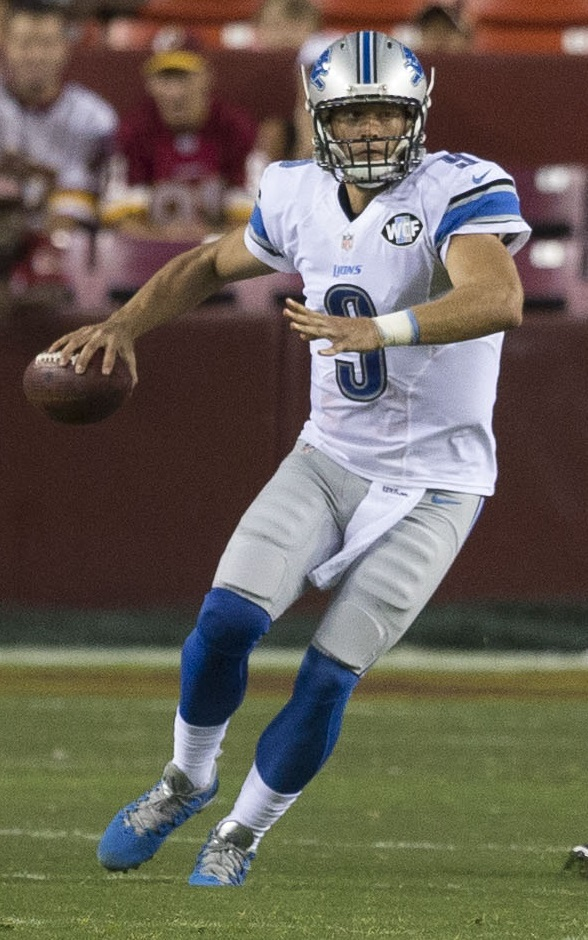
Matthew Stafford (2009–2020)

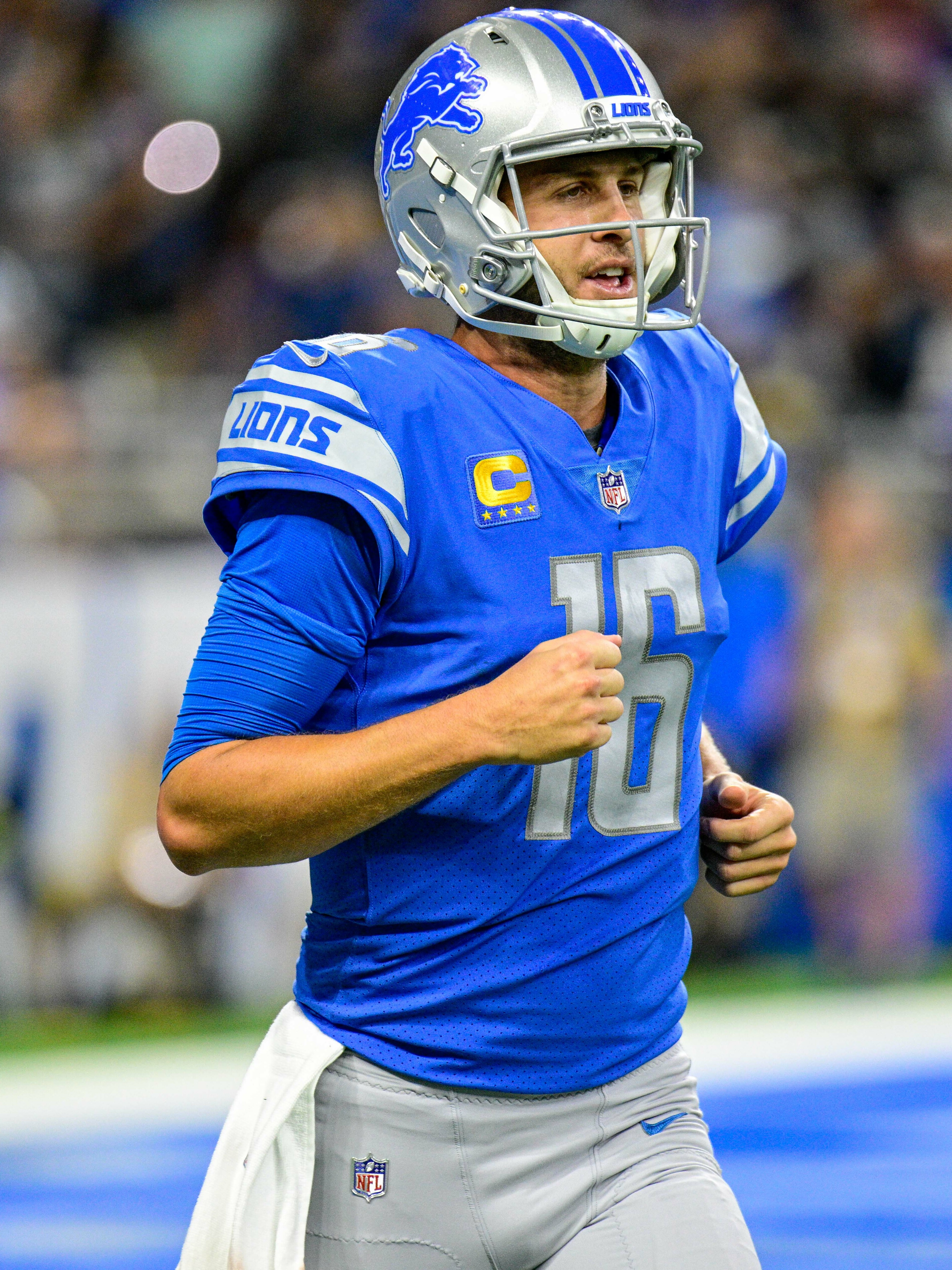
Jared Goff (2021–present)

The number of games they started during the season is listed to the right:

Season(s)	Quarterback(s)	Ref(s)
1950	Bobby Layne (12)	
1951	Bobby Layne (12)	
1952	Bobby Layne (11) / Jim Hardy (1)	
1953	Bobby Layne (11) / Tom Dublinski (1)	
1954	Bobby Layne (8) / Tom Dublinski (4)	
1955	Bobby Layne (10) / Harry Gilmer (2)	
1956	Bobby Layne (12)	
1957	Bobby Layne (7) / Tobin Rote (5)	
1958	Tobin Rote (11) / Bobby Layne (1)	
1959	Tobin Rote (7) / Earl Morrall (5)	
1960	Jim Ninowski (10) / Earl Morrall (2)	
1961	Jim Ninowski (8) / Earl Morrall (6)	
1962	Milt Plum (14)	
1963	Earl Morrall (10) / Milt Plum (4)	
1964	Milt Plum (11) / Earl Morrall (3)	
1965	Milt Plum (11) / George Izo (3)	
1966	Karl Sweetan (8) / Milt Plum (6)	
1967	Karl Sweetan (8) / Milt Plum (6)	
1968	Bill Munson (12) / Greg Landry (2)	
1969	Bill Munson (7) / Greg Landry (7)	
1970	Bill Munson (8) / Greg Landry (6)	
1971	Greg Landry (14)	
1972	Greg Landry (14)	
1973	Greg Landry (7) / Bill Munson (7)	
1974	Bill Munson (11) / Greg Landry (3)	
1975	Joe Reed (8) / Bill Munson (3) / Greg Landry (3)	
1976	Greg Landry (12) / Joe Reed (2)	
1977	Greg Landry (11) / Gary Danielson (2) / Joe Reed (1)	
1978	Gary Danielson (11) / Greg Landry (5)	
1979	Jeff Komlo (14) / Joe Reed (1) / Jerry Golsteyn (1)	
1980	Gary Danielson (16)	
1981	Eric Hipple (10) / Gary Danielson (4) / Jeff Komlo (2)	
1982	Gary Danielson (5) / Eric Hipple (4)	
1983	Eric Hipple (16)	
1984	Gary Danielson (14) / John Witkowski (1) / Eric Hipple (1)	
1985	Eric Hipple (15) / Joe Ferguson (1)	
1986	Eric Hipple (10) / Joe Ferguson (4) / Chuck Long (2)	
1987	Chuck Long (12) / Todd Hons (3)	
1988	Rusty Hilger (9) / Chuck Long (7)	
1989	Rodney Peete (8) / Bob Gagliano (7) / Eric Hipple (1)	
1990	Rodney Peete (11) / Bob Gagliano (4) / Andre Ware (1)	
1991	Rodney Peete (8) / Erik Kramer (8)	
1992	Rodney Peete (10) / Erik Kramer (3) / Andre Ware (3)	
1993	Rodney Peete (10) / Erik Kramer (4) / Andre Ware (2)	
1994	Scott Mitchell (9) / Dave Krieg (7)	
1995	Scott Mitchell (16)	
1996	Scott Mitchell (14) / Don Majkowski (2)	
1997	Scott Mitchell (16)	
1998	Charlie Batch (12) / Frank Reich (2) / Scott Mitchell (2)	
1999	Charlie Batch (10) / Gus Frerotte (6)	
2000	Charlie Batch (15) / Stoney Case (1)	
2001	Charlie Batch (9) / Ty Detmer (4) / Mike McMahon (3)	
2002	Joey Harrington (12) / Mike McMahon (4)	
2003	Joey Harrington (16)	
2004	Joey Harrington (16)	
2005	Joey Harrington (11) / Jeff Garcia (5)	
2006	Jon Kitna (16)	
2007	Jon Kitna (16)	
2008	Dan Orlovsky (7) / Daunte Culpepper (5) / Jon Kitna (4)	
2009	Matthew Stafford (10) / Daunte Culpepper (5) / Drew Stanton (1)	
2010	Shaun Hill (10) / Matthew Stafford (3) / Drew Stanton (3)	
2011	Matthew Stafford (16)	
2012	Matthew Stafford (16)	
2013	Matthew Stafford (16)	
2014	Matthew Stafford (16)	
2015	Matthew Stafford (16)	
2016	Matthew Stafford (16)	
2017	Matthew Stafford (16)	
2018	Matthew Stafford (16)	
2019	Matthew Stafford (8) / David Blough (5) / Jeff Driskel (3)	
2020	Matthew Stafford (16)	
2021	Jared Goff (14) / Tim Boyle (3)	
2022	Jared Goff (17)	
2023	Jared Goff (17)	
2024	Jared Goff (17)	
2025	Jared Goff (17)	
2026	Jared Goff (3)	

== Postseason ==
Season(s)	Quarterback(s)
1952	Bobby Layne (2–0)
1953	Bobby Layne (1–0)
1954	Bobby Layne (0–1)
1957	Tobin Rote (2–0)
1970	Greg Landry (0–1)
1982	Eric Hipple (0–1)
1983	Gary Danielson (0–1)
1991	Erik Kramer (1–1)
1993	Erik Kramer (0–1)
1994	Dave Krieg (0–1)
1995	Scott Mitchell (0–1)
1997	Scott Mitchell (0–1)
1999	Gus Frerotte (0–1)
2011	Matthew Stafford (0–1)
2014	Matthew Stafford (0–1)
2016	Matthew Stafford (0–1)
2023	Jared Goff (2–1)
2024	Jared Goff (0–1)

== Team career passing records ==
Through the 2026 NFL Regular Season

Name	Comp	Att	%	Yds	TD	Int
Matthew Stafford	3,898	6,224	62.6	45,109	282	141
Jared Goff	1,956	2,880	67.9	21,984	155	47
Bobby Layne	1,074	2,193	49.0	15,710	118	142
Scott Mitchell	1,049	1,850	56.7	12,647	79	57
Greg Landry	957	1,747	54.8	12,451	80	81
Gary Danielson	952	1,684	56.5	11,885	69	71
Eric Hipple	830	1,546	53.7	10,711	55	70
Joey Harrington	986	1,802	54.7	10,242	60	62

== Team career win / loss record ==
Through the 2026 NFL regular season

Record (W–L–T) %	Quarterback(s)
74–90–1 (.452)	Matthew Stafford
53–29–2 (.643)	Bobby Layne
49–34–1 (.589)	Jared Goff
40–41–3 (.494)	Greg Landry
28–29 (.491)	Eric Hipple
27–30 (.474)	Scott Mitchell
24–21–3 (.531)	Bill Munson
23–25–4 (.481)	Milt Plum
23–28–1 (.452)	Gary Danielson
21–26 (.447)	Rodney Peete
