= Jared Goff =

American football player (born 1994)

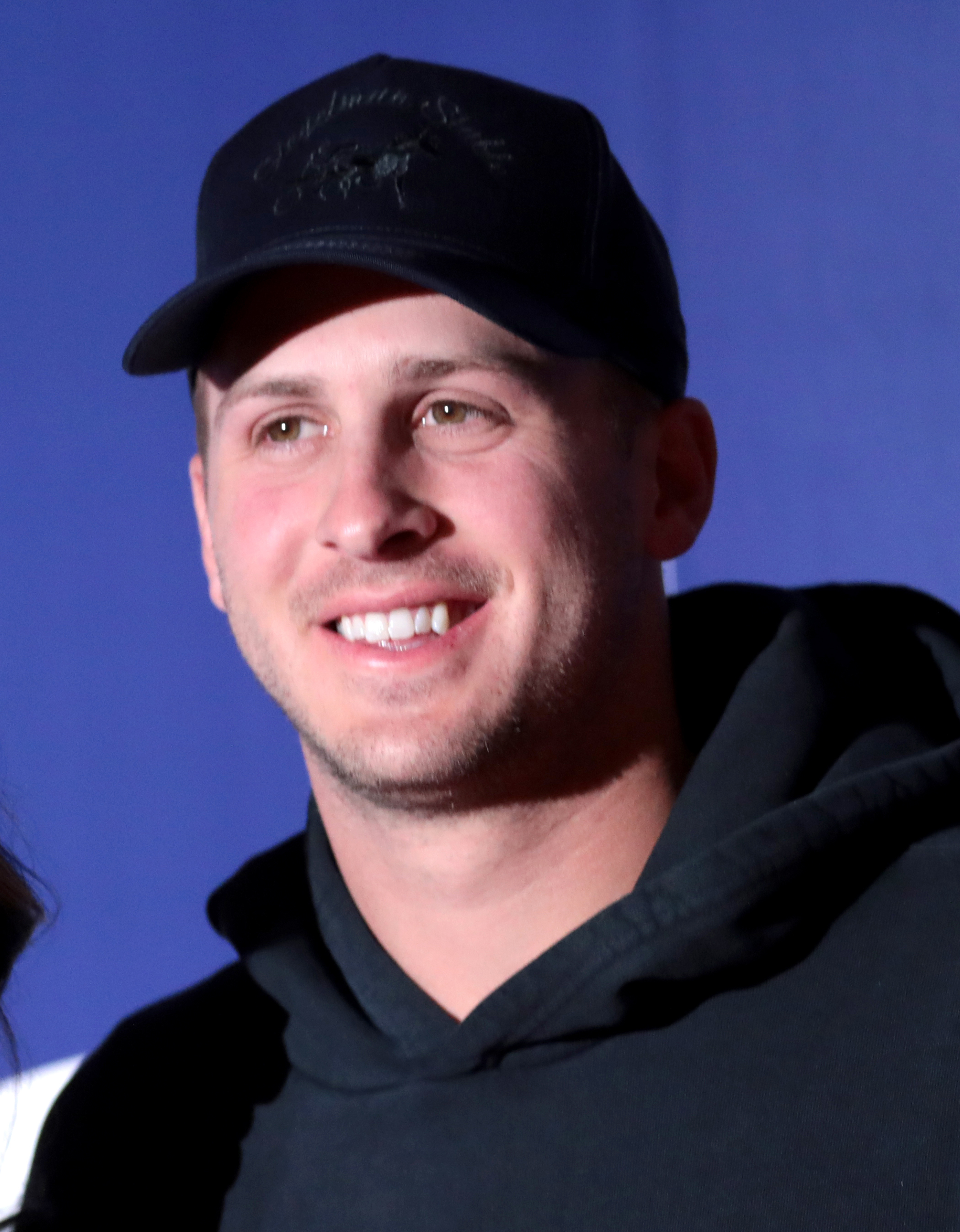
- Goff in 2023

No. 16 – Detroit Lions
- Position: Quarterback
- Roster status: Active

Personal information
- Born: October 14, 1994 (age 32); Novato, California, U.S.
- Listed height: 6 ft 4 in (1.93 m)
- Listed weight: 217 lb (98 kg)

Career information
- High school: Marin Catholic (Kentfield, California)
- College: California (2013–2015)
- NFL draft: 2016: 1st round, 1st overall pick

Career history
- Los Angeles Rams (2016–2020); Detroit Lions (2021–present)

Awards and highlights
- NFL Most Improved Player (2017); 5× Pro Bowl (2017, 2018, 2022, 2024, 2025); Pro Bowl Offensive MVP (2024); First-team All-Pac-12 (2015); Armed Forces Bowl Most Valuable Player (2015); NFL records: Most pass attempts in a game with a perfect passer rating: 33 (tied) (Note: Tied with Deshaun Watson.); Most pass attempts in a game without an incompletion: 18; First quarterback in NFL history to complete 100% of his passes in a game on more than 10 pass attempts : 18 passes completed

Career NFL statistics as of Week 10, 2026
- Passing attempts: 5,528
- Passing completions: 3,645
- Completion percentage: 65.9%
- TD–INT: 274–106
- Passing yards: 42,059
- Passer rating: 97.3
- Rushing yards: 619
- Rushing touchdowns: 13
- Stats at Pro Football Reference

Jared Thomas Goff (born October 14, 1994) is an American professional football quarterback for the Detroit Lions of the National Football League (NFL). He played college football for the California Golden Bears of the University of California earning first-team All-Pac-12 honors in 2015 and setting Pac-12 Conference single-season records for passing yards and passing touchdowns. Selected first overall by the Los Angeles Rams in the 2016 NFL draft, Goff had a breakout season in 2017, leading the Rams to their first playoff appearance since 2004. The following year, Goff led Los Angeles to Super Bowl LIII. He received Pro Bowl honors in both seasons.

Goff was traded to the Lions in 2021 and two years later, he led the team to their first playoff win since 1991 en route to an appearance in the NFC Championship Game. A year later, Goff helped the Lions clinch consecutive NFC North division titles for the first time since 1954 and reach a franchise–record 15 wins. Goff was named to the Pro Bowl both seasons.

== Early life ==
Goff was born on October 14, 1994, in San Rafael, California, and raised in Novato, California, the son of Jerry Goff, a former Major League Baseball player. He has an older sister named Lauren. Goff grew up as a San Francisco 49ers fan and wore the number 16 as a tribute to Joe Montana, who played for the 49ers before Goff was born.

Goff attended Marin Catholic High School in Kentfield, California, and graduated in 2013. He played for the football team, throwing for 7,687 yards and 93 touchdowns with 18 interceptions in three varsity seasons at Marin Catholic, completing 477-of-767 passes (62.2%), equal to a passer rating of 125.5, for teams that combined to post a 39–4 overall record and 21–0 Marin County Athletic League mark on their way to an appearance in the state title game, a North Coast Section crown, three NCS playoff appearances, and three MCAL championships. Goff also played basketball and baseball for Marin Catholic.

== College career ==
Goff was recruited by a number of college programs and received scholarship offers from Boise State, Fresno State, and Washington State before choosing to attend the University of California. He was a mid-year enrollee at Cal in January 2013 and joined the Golden Bears for 2013 spring practices. In August, Goff was named starting quarterback for the 2013 season over redshirt freshman quarterback Zach Kline, becoming the first true freshman quarterback in Cal history to start a season opener.

Goff set numerous school records. This included passing yards (12,220), passing yards per game (329.7 ypg), touchdown passes (96), completions (977), passing attempts (1,569), total offense (12,086), and total plays (1,739). He is second only to Aaron Rodgers on Cal's all-time list for passing efficiency (143.95).

=== 2013 season ===
Under new head coach Sonny Dykes, Goff started all 12 games in the 2013 season, and although the team finished 1–11, he set Cal single-season records for passing yards (3,508), yardage gained (3,508), total offense (3,446), passes completed (320), and passes attempted (530). Goff finished his true freshman season with a 60.3 completion percentage with 18 touchdown passes and 10 interceptions.

=== 2014 season ===
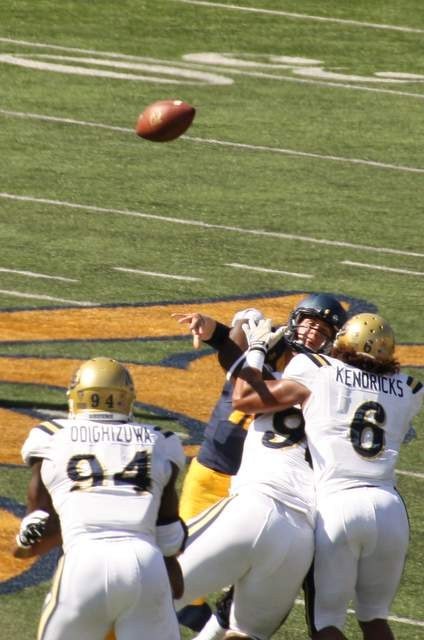
Goff throws under pressure against UCLA in 2014

In 2014, Goff was again the starting quarterback for the Golden Bears. In a September 27 matchup against the Colorado Buffaloes, Goff threw a career-high seven touchdown passes, completing 24 of 42 passes for 458 yards. On October 4, Goff threw for a new career-high and school-record 527 yards and five touchdowns in a 60–59 victory over Washington State. Goff helped lead the Golden Bears to a 5–7 season, a four-win improvement over the 2013 season. He finished the 2014 season with 3,973 yards, 35 touchdowns, and a 62% completion rate, once again setting new school records.

=== 2015 season ===
In 2015, as a junior, Goff led the Bears to a 7–5 regular-season finish, clinching Cal's first winning season since 2011. Going into the season, Goff was projected as the top quarterback for the 2016 NFL draft by Mel Kiper Jr. and Todd McShay. On November 14, 2015, Goff threw for 453 yards and six touchdowns in a 54–24 victory over Oregon State, earning Pac-12 Offensive Player of the Week honors for the first time. Two weeks later, Goff set a new Cal single-game record with 542 passing yards in a 48–46 come-from-behind victory over Arizona State, earning Player of the Week honors for a second time. In the 2015 Armed Forces Bowl, Goff threw for six touchdown passes and 467 yards, leading the Bears to a 55–36 victory over Air Force.

In 2015, Goff set a new Pac-12 single-season passing-yardage record (4,714), and also set a new conference record for touchdown passes in a season (43). He earned first-team All-Pac-12 honors. He was the first Cal quarterback to earn first-team All-Pac-12 honors since Rodgers in 2004 while leading an 8–5 Cal team to a winning record and bowl game for the first time since 2011 as well as a post-season win for the first time since 2008.

During Goff's time as quarterback, the Golden Bears never beat an in-state rival, going 0–9 against Stanford, UCLA, and USC, and they also went 0–3 against division rival Oregon. Goff's father has been quoted as saying the lack of a marquee win bothered his son. Goff majored in sociology during his time at Cal.

After his junior season, Goff announced his decision to forgo his senior season and enter the 2016 NFL draft.

== Professional career ==
=== Pre-draft ===
Pre-draft measurables
| Height | Weight | Arm length | Hand span | Wingspan | 40-yard dash | 10-yard split | 20-yard split | 20-yard shuttle | Three-cone drill | Vertical jump | Broad jump | Wonderlic |
|---|---|---|---|---|---|---|---|---|---|---|---|---|
| 6 ft 4 in (1.93 m) | 215 lb (98 kg) | 32 3/4 in (0.83 m) | 9 in (0.23 m) | 6 ft 5 7/8 in (1.98 m) | 4.82 s | 1.65 s | 2.71 s | 4.47 s | 7.17 s | 27 in (0.69 m) | 9 ft 2 in (2.79 m) | 36 |
All values from NFL Combine

In mid-February 2016, most analysts had Goff projected to be selected in the early first round of the draft, with the second overall pick of the Cleveland Browns being his most frequently predicted landing spot, or the San Francisco 49ers with the seventh overall pick. Despite not excelling at the physical tests at the NFL Scouting Combine, Goff still improved his draft stock with a strong showing in the positional drills. Goff also reportedly scored a 36 on his Wonderlic exam.

=== Los Angeles Rams ===
==== 2016 season ====
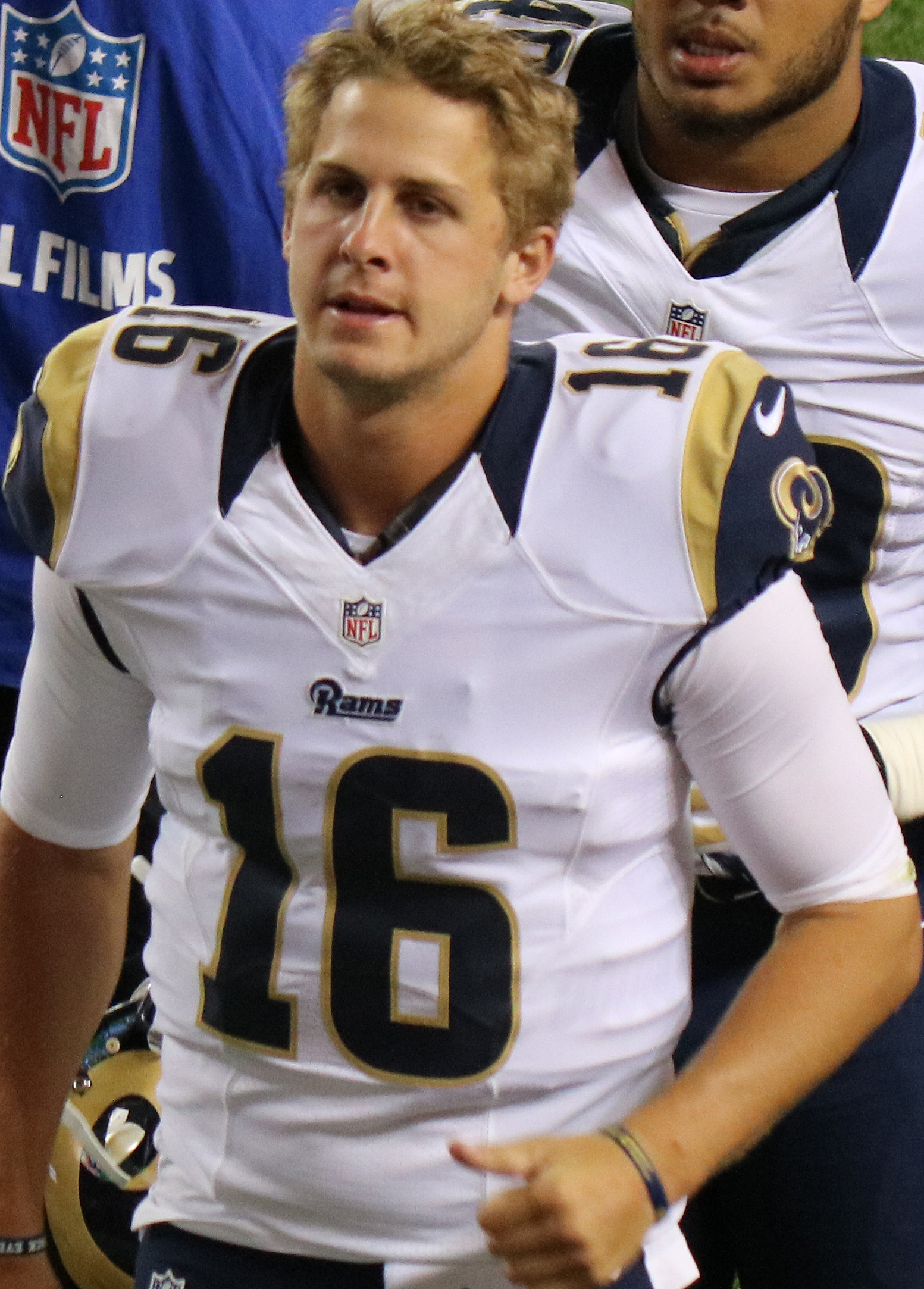
Goff in 2016

Goff was selected first overall by the Los Angeles Rams in the 2016 NFL draft. The Rams had traded up in the first round and acquired the first pick from the Tennessee Titans. Goff was the second Rams quarterback to be taken first overall in six years; the Rams had selected Sam Bradford first overall six years earlier. Goff was the last first round pick made by the Rams until Jared Verse in 2024.

On June 9, 2016, Goff signed a four-year deal with $27.9 million guaranteed, including an $18.6 million signing bonus.

On November 15, Goff was named the Rams' starting quarterback for the game against the Miami Dolphins after spending the first nine games as the backup to veteran quarterback Case Keenum. Goff started the final seven games of the season. On November 20, 2016, he made his professional debut and first NFL start against the Dolphins and completed 17 of 31 attempts for 134 yards in the 14–10 loss. The following week against the New Orleans Saints, he threw his first NFL touchdown on a 24-yard completion to wide receiver Tavon Austin in the first quarter and had his first career interception in the third quarter after being picked off by Saints safety Kenny Vaccaro. Goff finished the 49–21 road loss completing 20-of-32 passes for 214 yards, three touchdowns, and an interception.

During a Week 14 42–14 loss to the Atlanta Falcons, Goff completed 24 of 41 passes for 235 yards and two interceptions. He also had his first NFL rushing touchdown on a two-yard run in the fourth quarter.

As a rookie, Goff made seven starts. The Rams lost each of those games finishing with an overall record of 4–12. Goff completed 112 of 205 passes for 1,089 yards, five touchdowns, and seven interceptions to go along with 16 rushing yards and a touchdown.

==== 2017 season: Playoff debut ====
Goff entered the season with a new head coach in Sean McVay. During the season-opening 46–9 victory over the Indianapolis Colts, Goff achieved his first professional victory while completing 21-of-29 passes for 306 yards and a touchdown. His performance against the Colts marked his first career game with at least 300 passing yards. Two weeks later against the 49ers, Goff completed 22 of 28 passes for 292 yards and three touchdowns, leading the Rams to a narrow 41–39 road victory.

During a Week 4 35–30 road victory over the Dallas Cowboys, Goff completed 21-of-36 passes for 255 yards and two touchdowns. In the next game against the Seattle Seahawks, Goff notably struggled, as he completed only 46.8% of his passes for 288 yards and two interceptions during the 16–10 loss. The following week against the Jacksonville Jaguars, Goff threw for 124 yards and a touchdown in a 27–17 road victory.

During a Week 7 33–0 shutout victory over the Arizona Cardinals at Twickenham Stadium, Goff had 235 passing yards, a touchdown, and an interception. Two weeks later against the New York Giants at MetLife Stadium, he threw for 311 yards and four touchdowns in the 51–17 road victory. Goff was named NFC Offensive Player of the Week for his performance. In the next game against the Houston Texans, Goff finished with 355 passing yards and three touchdowns during the 33–7 victory. In the game, he threw a 94-yard touchdown pass to Robert Woods.

During a Week 12 26–20 victory over the Saints, Goff finished with 354 passing yards, two touchdowns, and an interception. Two weeks later against the Philadelphia Eagles, Goff went up against 2016 second overall pick Carson Wentz. Although he completed 16 of 26 attempts for 199 yards and two touchdowns, Goff fumbled the ball in the last minute, resulting in a 43–35 loss. In the next game against the Seahawks, he completed 14-of-21 passes for only 120 yards and two touchdowns during the 42–7 road victory. The following week against the Tennessee Titans, Goff finished with 301 passing yards and four touchdowns in the 27–23 road victory. With the win, the Rams clinched the NFC West for the first time since 2003. As a result, Goff sat out of the regular-season finale against the 49ers. He was named as the PFWA Most Improved Player.

Goff finished his second professional season with 3,804 passing yards, 28 touchdowns, and seven interceptions to go along with 51 rushing yards and a touchdown in 15 games and starts. He led the league in yards per pass completion with 12.9. During the Wild Card Round against the Falcons, Goff completed 24-of-45 passes for 259 yards and a touchdown in the 26–13 loss. On January 22, 2018, he was named to his first Pro Bowl as an injury and Super Bowl replacement for Carson Wentz. Goff was ranked 38th by his fellow players on the NFL Top 100 Players of 2018.

==== 2018 season: Super Bowl LIII ====
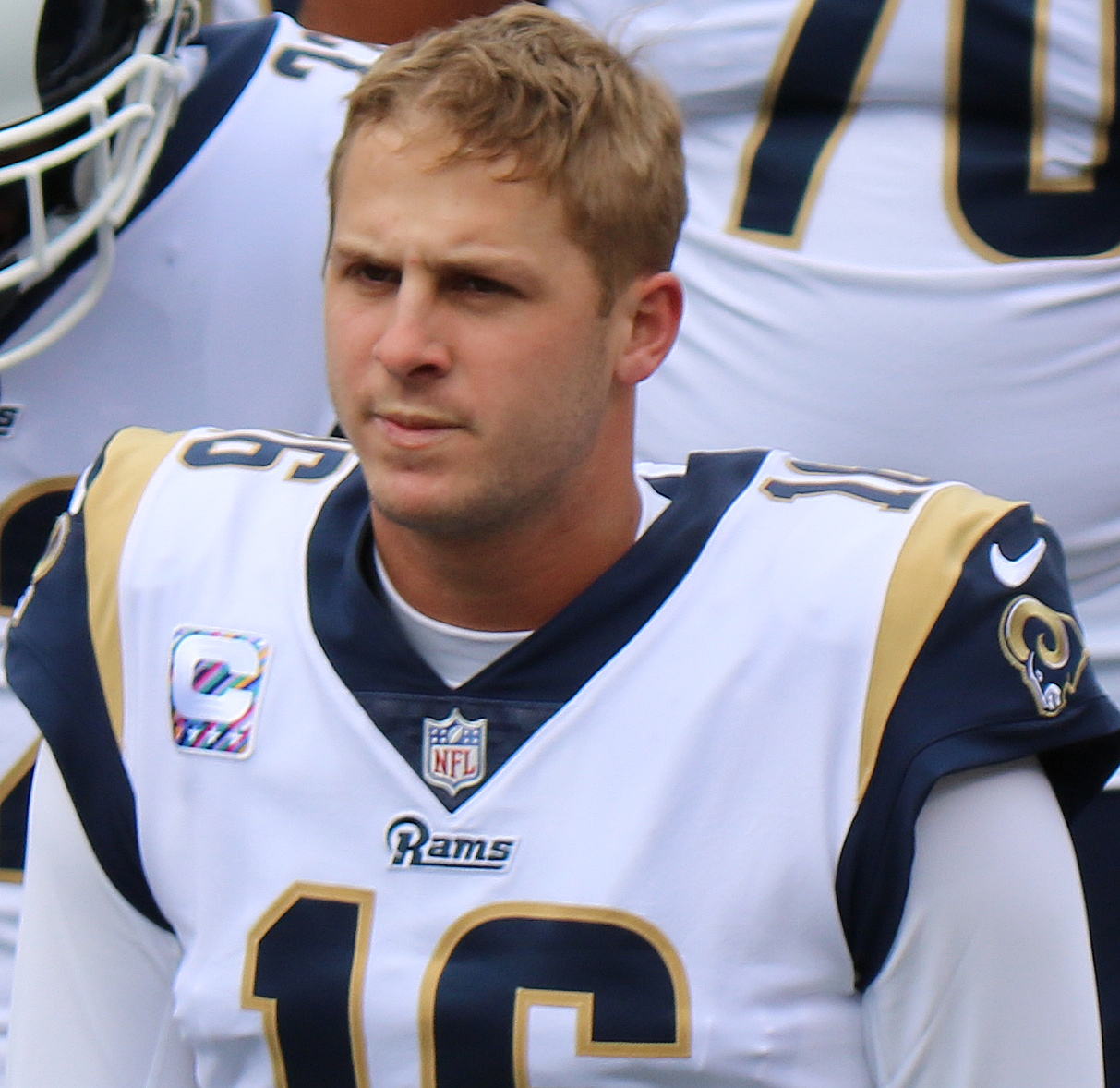
Goff in 2018

Goff started the 2018 season throwing for 233 yards and two touchdowns during the season-opening 33–13 road victory over the Oakland Raiders, followed by back-to-back 354-yard games in wins over the Cardinals and the cross-town rival Los Angeles Chargers. In the Chargers game, he also had a career best 80.5% completion percentage on 29-of-36 passing for three touchdowns and one interception. During a Week 4 38–31 victory over the Minnesota Vikings on Thursday Night Football, Goff completed 26-of-33 passes for a career-high 465 yards and five touchdowns, finishing with a perfect quarterback rating of 158.3. His performance set the record for most passing yards and attempts while maintaining a perfect passer rating, surpassing Ken O'Brien's 32 attempts for 431 yards in 1986. Goff was named the NFC Offensive Player of the Week for his performance. Goff was later named the NFC Offensive Player of the Month for September.

Against the Kansas City Chiefs in Week 11, Goff threw for 413 yards and four touchdowns as the Rams won 54–51 on Monday Night Football in the third-highest-scoring NFL game in history. Three weeks later against the Chicago Bears on Sunday Night Football, Goff threw for 180 yards, no touchdowns, and a career-high four interceptions in the 15–6 road loss. Goff ended the season by throwing for 199 yards and four touchdowns in a 48–32 victory over the 49ers, and finished 2018 with 4,688 yards, the second-highest single-season total in franchise history, and his 32 touchdown passes were the third-highest total among Ram quarterbacks, trailing only Hall of Famer Kurt Warner in both categories. He was selected to his second straight Pro Bowl for his performance in 2018.

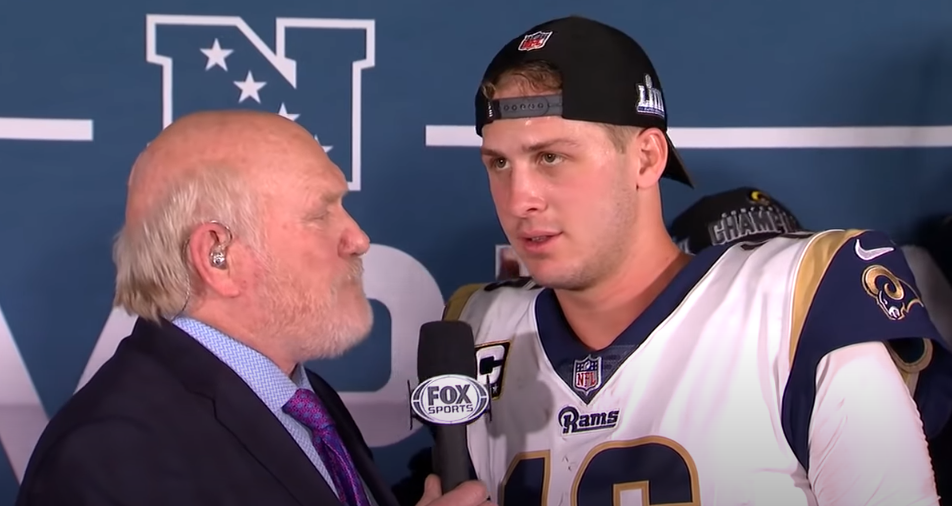
Goff interviewed by Terry Bradshaw after winning the 2018 NFC Championship Game

The Rams finished the 2018 season atop the NFC West with a 13–3 record and qualified for the playoffs as the #2 seed. In the Divisional Round against the Cowboys, Goff recorded 186 passing yards during the 30–22 victory. During the NFC Championship Game against the Saints, he threw for 297 yards, a touchdown, and an interception in the 26–23 overtime victory. Although the team was aided by a controversial no-call by the officials, Goff was clutch in several key plays and became the youngest quarterback to win an NFC Championship Game.

Goff and the Rams advanced to Super Bowl LIII to face the New England Patriots. The game was largely dominated by both sides' defenses, and Goff completed 19-of-38 passes for 229 yards and an interception to Stephon Gilmore late in the fourth quarter of the 13–3 loss. The Rams tied the 1971 Miami Dolphins in Super Bowl VI for the fewest points in Super Bowl history in the loss. Goff was ranked 32nd by his fellow players on the NFL Top 100 Players of 2019.

==== 2019 season ====
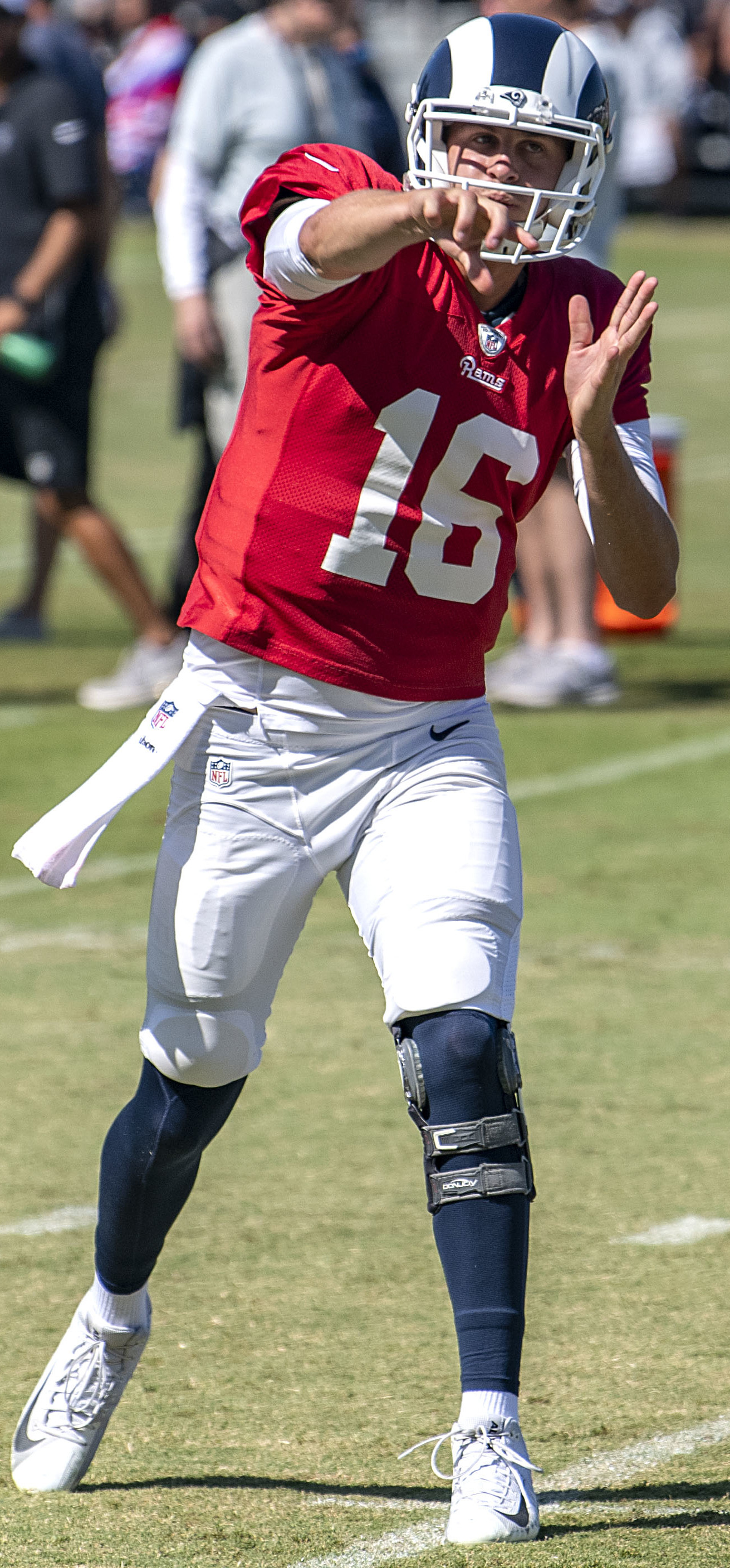
Goff at training camp in 2019

On April 23, 2019, the Rams picked up the fifth-year option on Goff's contract. On September 3, he agreed to a four-year extension worth $134 million with $110 million guaranteed. At the time, it was an NFL record for the most guaranteed money in a contract, surpassed by Patrick Mahomes in 2020.

Goff helped lead the Rams to a 3–0 start with victories over the Carolina Panthers, Saints, and Browns. During a Week 4 55–40 loss to the Tampa Bay Buccaneers, Goff finished with a career-high 517 passing yards, two touchdowns, and three interceptions. He tied the NFL record for completions in a regular-season game with 45, equaling Drew Bledsoe's Week 11 performance against the Vikings in 1994. In the next game against the Seahawks, Goff threw for 395 yards, a touchdown, and an interception in the narrow 30–29 road loss. The following week against the 49ers, Goff threw for a career-low 78 passing yards in the 20–7 loss.

During a Week 7 37–10 road victory over the Falcons, he helped stop the Rams' three-game losing streak with 268 passing yards and two touchdowns in the 37–10 victory. In the next game against the Cincinnati Bengals in London, Goff threw for 372 yards and two touchdowns during the 24–10 victory. During a Week 13 34–7 road victory over the Cardinals, Goff threw for 424 yards and two touchdowns. He was named NFC Offensive Player of the Week for his performance. Three weeks later against the 49ers, Goff finished with 323 passing yards, two touchdowns, and an interception as the Rams lost on the road by a score of 34–31 and were eliminated from playoff contention. In the regular season finale against the Cardinals, Goff threw for 319 yards and three touchdowns during the 31–24 victory.

Goff finished the 2019 season with 4,638 passing yards, 22 touchdowns, and 16 interceptions to go along with 40 rushing yards and two touchdowns in 16 games and starts as the Rams finished with a 9–7 record. His 626 pass attempts led the league in the 2019 season. Goff's 394 pass completions set a single season franchise record at the time.

==== 2020 season: Final year in Los Angeles ====
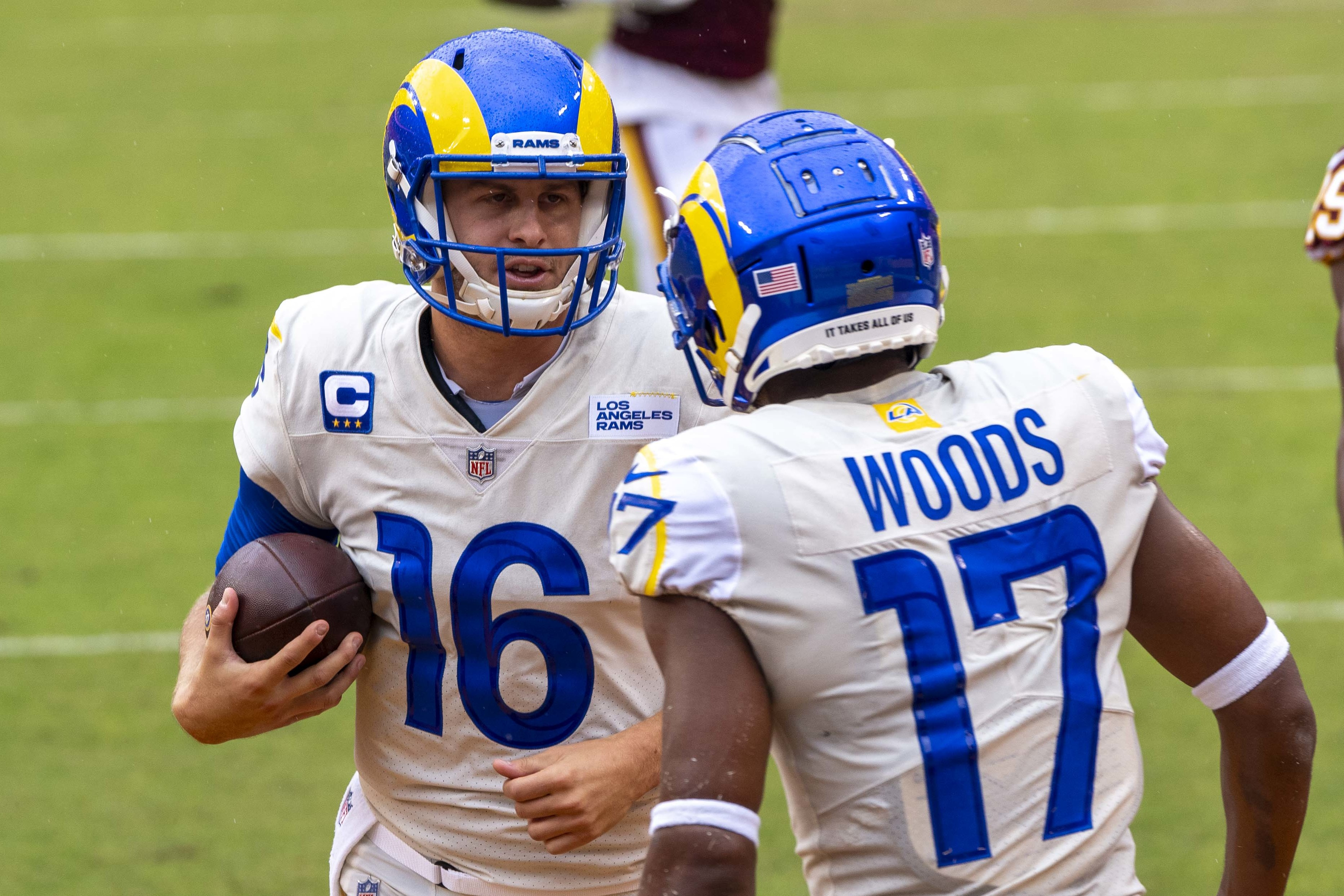
Goff with Robert Woods in 2020

During the season-opener against the Cowboys, the first ever football game to be played at SoFi Stadium, Goff finished with 275 passing yards and an interception as the Rams won 20–17. In the next game against the Eagles, Goff threw for 267 yards and three touchdowns to tight end Tyler Higbee during the 37–19 road victory. The following week against the Buffalo Bills, Goff finished with 321 passing yards, two touchdowns, and an interception as the Rams narrowly lost on the road by a score of 35–32. The Rams overcame a 28–3 deficit to lead 32–28 before giving up the go-ahead score toward the end of the game.

During a Week 11 27–24 road victory over the Buccaneers, Goff threw for 376 yards, three touchdowns, and two interceptions. Two weeks later against the Cardinals, he had 351 passing yards and a touchdown in the 38–28 road victory. During Week 16 against the Seahawks, Goff threw for 234 yards and an interception before leaving the eventual 20–9 road loss with a broken thumb in the third quarter. As a result, he was forced to miss the regular-season finale against the Cardinals.

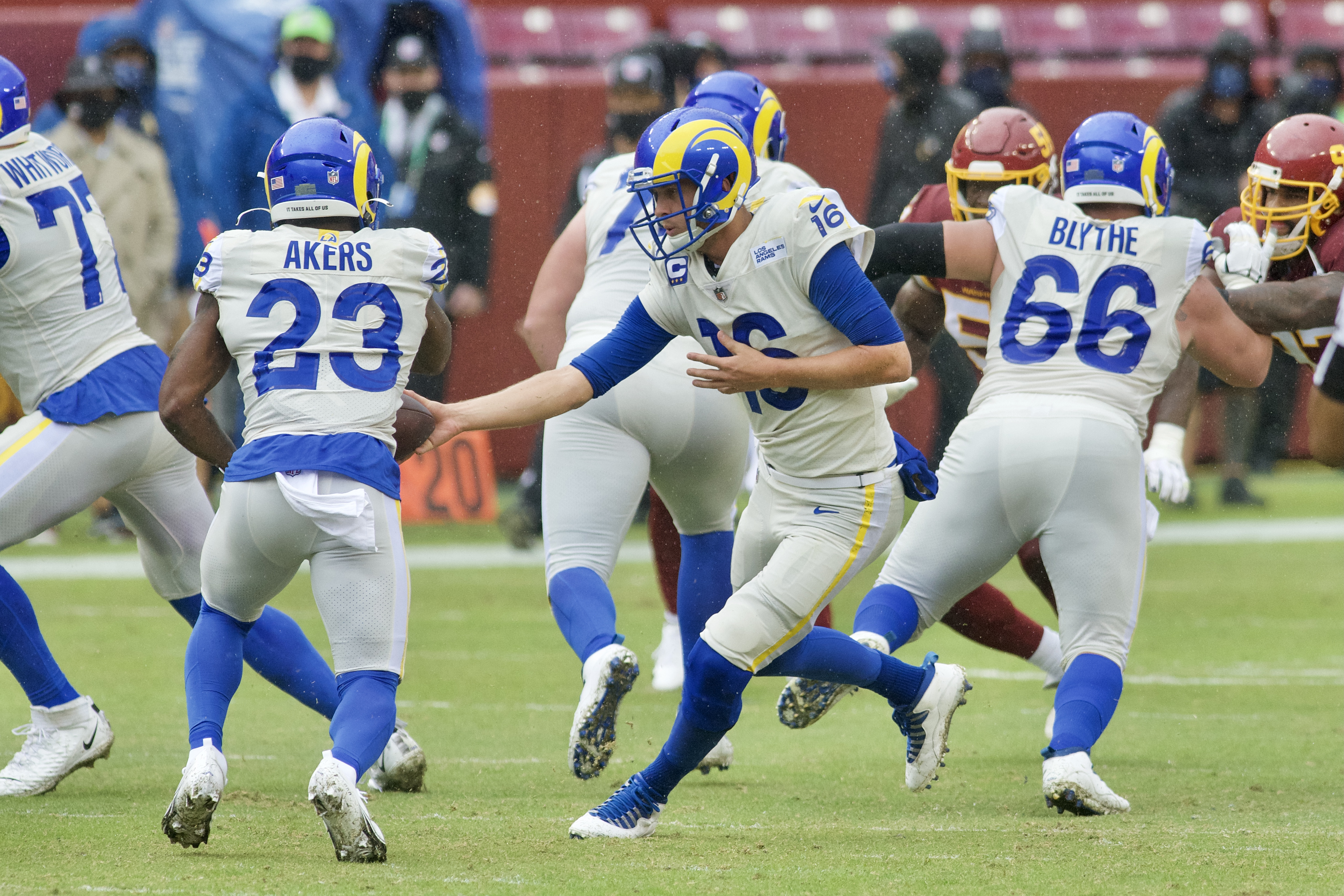
Goff handing the ball off to Cam Akers in 2020

Goff finished the 2020 season with 3,952 passing yards, 20 touchdowns, and 13 interceptions to go along with 99 rushing yards and four touchdowns in 15 games and starts. During the Wild Card Round against the Seahawks, Goff was cleared to play but began the game as the backup to John Wolford. Goff came in the game during the first quarter after Wolford left the game with a neck injury. In the game, he completed nine of 19 passes for 155 yards and a touchdown as the Rams won on the road by a score of 30–20. In the Divisional Round against the Green Bay Packers, Goff completed 21 of 27 passes for 174 yards and a touchdown during the 32–18 road loss.

=== Detroit Lions ===
==== 2021 season ====
On March 18, 2021, Goff was traded alongside the Rams' first round draft picks in 2022 and 2023, and a 2021 third-round pick to the Detroit Lions in exchange for quarterback Matthew Stafford. Goff was informed of the trade by Rams head coach Sean McVay right before it was posted to social media.

Goff made his Lions debut in the season-opener against the 49ers. He finished the game completing 38 of 57 passes for 338 yards, three touchdowns, and an interception returned for a touchdown as the Lions lost 41–33 despite a late rally. During a Week 7 matchup against his former team, the Rams, Goff threw for 268 yards, a touchdown, and two interceptions as the Lions lost on the road by a score of 28–19. Three weeks later against the Pittsburgh Steelers, Goff suffered an oblique injury, leaving Tim Boyle to start the following week. Goff returned for the Lions' Thanksgiving game against the Bears, where he threw for 171 yards and two touchdowns in the narrow 16–14 loss. In the next game against the Vikings, he threw for 296 yards, three touchdowns, and an interception as the Lions narrowly won 29–27, snapping the Lions' 15–game losing streak. Goff was named NFC Offensive Player of the Week for his performance. The game also marked Goff's first win without head coach Sean McVay, having been a combined 0–16–1 in games with a different head coach. Goff and the Lions went on to win three of their last four games, including the Vikings victory, one against the Cardinals, and a surprising season finale victory over the Packers to finish with a 3–13–1 record.

Goff finished his first season with the Lions with 3,245 yards, 19 touchdowns, and eight interceptions to go along with 87 rushing yards in 14 games and starts, missing three games due to an injury and being on the COVID-19 reserve list.

==== 2022 season ====
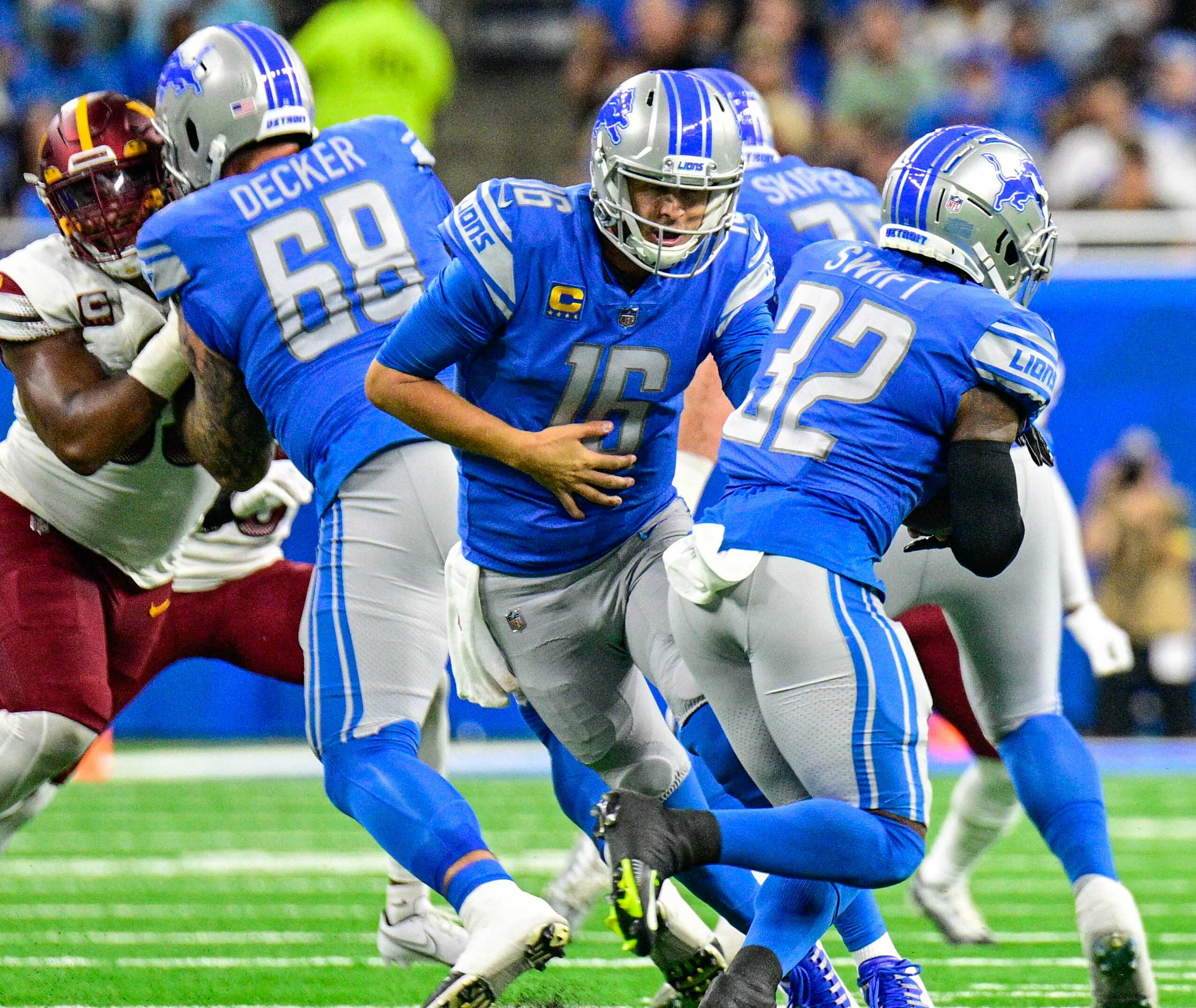
Goff handing the ball off to D'Andre Swift in 2022

In the season-opener against the Eagles, Goff threw for 215 yards and two touchdowns, but threw an interception returned for a touchdown as the Lions lost by a score of 38–35. In the next game against the Washington Commanders, he threw for 256 yards and four touchdowns during the 36–27 victory. In the Week 2 game against the Commanders, Goff produced his sixth straight home game with two or more passing touchdowns, establishing a Lions franchise record. Two weeks later, Goff again threw four touchdown passes, and this time added a tenure-high 378 passing yards during a 48–45 loss to the Seahawks.

Goff finished the 2022 season with the Lions with 4,438 passing yards, 29 touchdowns, and seven interceptions in 17 games and starts. He was named to his third Pro Bowl as an alternative, replacing the Super Bowl-bound Jalen Hurts. Goff was the first Lions quarterback to receive a Pro Bowl selection since Stafford in 2014. He was ranked 66th by his fellow players on the NFL Top 100 Players of 2023.

==== 2023 season: Breaking the Lions' playoff victory drought ====
During the NFL Kickoff Game against the Kansas City Chiefs, Goff completed 22-of-35 passes for 253 yards and a touchdown in a narrow 21–20 upset victory. The win also improved his record against Patrick Mahomes to 2–0. The following week against the Seattle Seahawks, Goff completed 80% of his passes (28-of-35) for 323 yards, three touchdowns, and an interception returned for a touchdown as the Lions lost in overtime, 37–31. On the road against the Packers in Week 4, Goff passed for 201 yards with a touchdown and interception as the Lions won 34–20, improving Goff's record to 5–1 in his career against the Packers. In Week 6, Goff completed 30-of-44 passes for 353 yards and two touchdowns in a 20–6 win over the Buccaneers, earning NFC Offensive Player of the Week honors. Goff and the Lions saw their four-game winning streak come to an end in a 38–6 loss to the Baltimore Ravens, but they rebounded against the Las Vegas Raiders, with Goff throwing for 272 yards, one touchdown, and an interception in a 26–14 victory heading into the bye week.

Following their bye week, Goff led the Lions to a 41–38 victory over the Los Angeles Chargers in Week 10. He finished with 333 yards, and two touchdowns, and orchestrated a nine-play, 53-yard drive, culminating in a game-winning 41-yard field goal. The following week against the Bears, Goff threw three interceptions and trailed by 12 with under five minutes left in the fourth quarter. However, Goff rallied the Lions to 17 straight points to win 31–26. The win put the Lions at 8–2 for the first time since 1962. After committing three turnovers and losing to the Bears 28–13 in Week 14, Goff rebounded the following week, throwing for 278 yards and tying a career-high five touchdown passes in a 42–17 rout over the Denver Broncos. In Week 16, Goff converted 30-of-40 passes for 257 yards and a touchdown in a 30–24 win against the Vikings, clinching the Lions' first division title since 1993 and first since the NFC Central was renamed NFC North. In the regular season finale against the Vikings, Goff threw for 320 yards with two touchdowns, marking his fifth 300-yard game of the season as the Lions won 30–20.

In the Wild Card Round against his former team, the Rams, Goff led the Lions to a narrow 24–23 victory to secure their first playoff victory since 1991. Goff became one of five quarterbacks in NFL postseason history to produce a game with 275+ passing yards, a completion percentage of 80%+, and a passer rating of 120.0+. In the Divisional Round against the Buccaneers, Goff completed 30 of 43 passes for 287 yards and directed touchdown drives on three consecutive possessions in the second half en route to a 31–23 victory, moving the Lions one win away from their first Super Bowl appearance in franchise history. Against the 49ers in the NFC Championship Game, Goff and the Lions jumped out to a 24–7 halftime lead. However, two key fourth-down incompletions swung the momentum to the 49ers, who scored 27 straight points as the Lions lost on the road 34–31. Goff completed 25-for-41 passes for 273 yards, a touchdown, and no turnovers. He was ranked 48th by his fellow players on the NFL Top 100 Players of 2024.

==== 2024 season: First seed and playoff disappointment ====
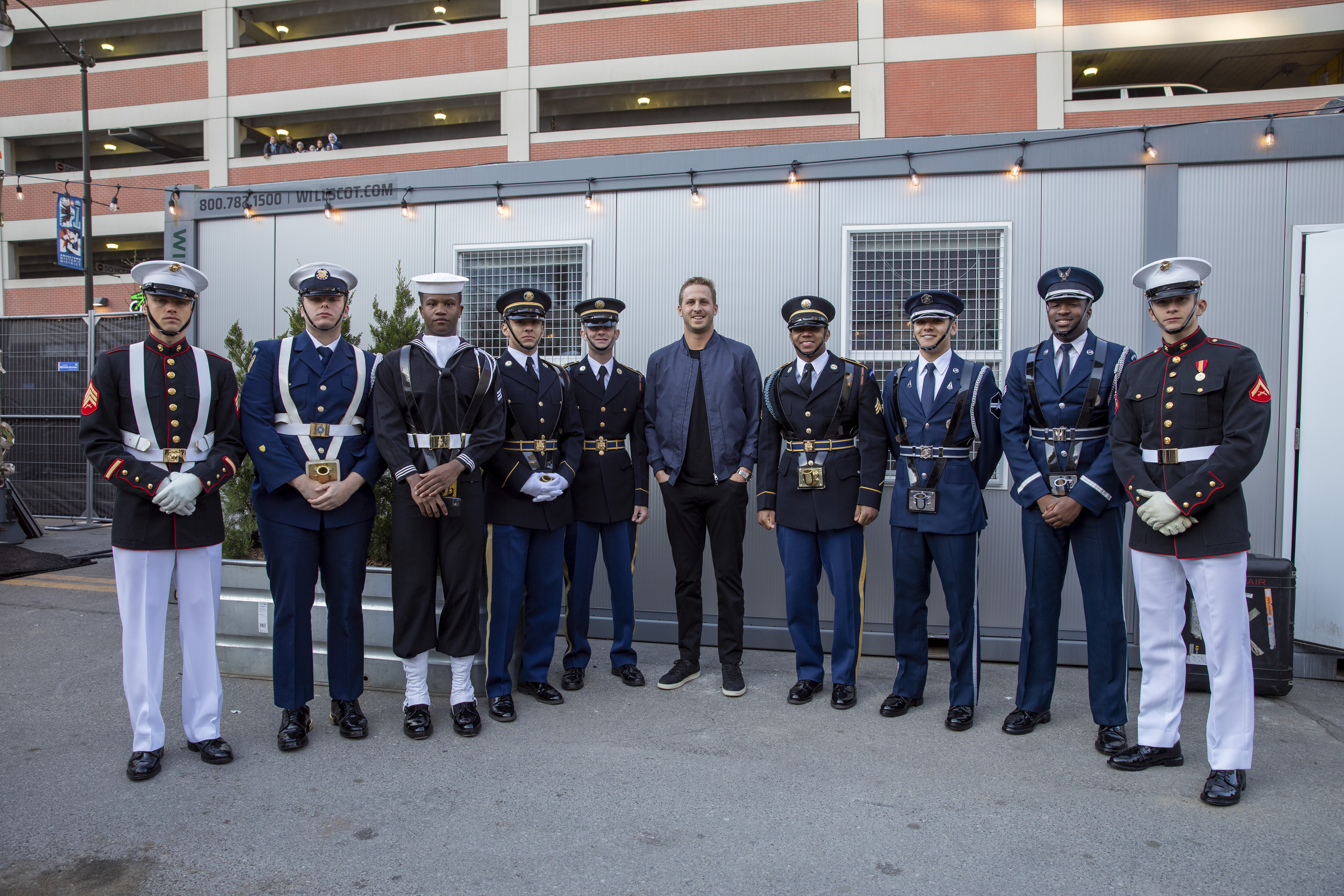
Goff with members of the Joint Armed Forces Color Guard in 2024

On May 16, 2024, Goff signed a four-year, $212 million contract extension, with $170 million guaranteed, keeping him under contract with the Lions through the 2027 season, with an option for 2028.

The Lions began the season with a 26–20 overtime victory over the Rams, a rematch of the previous year's Wild Card game. After a two-interception loss to the Buccaneers in Week 2, Goff bounced back with a 20–13 victory over the Cardinals, completing his first 14 passes and throwing two touchdowns. Two weeks later against the Seattle Seahawks, Goff went 18-for-18 for 292 yards, two touchdowns, and also caught a touchdown pass, becoming the first quarterback in NFL history to complete all his passes with at least 11 attempts. Following a bye, Goff led the Lions to a 47–9 road victory over the Cowboys, passing for 315 yards, three touchdowns and becoming the second quarterback to finish with a passer rating of 150+ in consecutive starts, joining Drew Brees in 2018. Goff then helped the Lions beat the undefeated Vikings in Week 7, throwing for 280 yards and two touchdowns, and threw three touchdowns in a dominant Week 8 52–14 victory over the Tennessee Titans. Goff finished October with an 80% completion rate, 680 yards, eight touchdowns, and a 149.8 passer rating, earning NFC Offensive Player of the Month honors and becoming the first Lions quarterback to win the award.

During Week 10 against the Houston Texans, Goff threw a career-high five interceptions but overcame his miscues to lead the Lions to a 26–23 road victory, becoming the first quarterback since 2012 to win with five or more interceptions in a game. He rebounded the following week against the Jacksonville Jaguars, directing the offense to a franchise record 644 yards and finishing the game with 412 yards and four touchdowns, earning his second career perfect passer rating as the Lions won 52–6. On Thanksgiving, Goff threw two touchdowns in a 23–20 win over the Bears, ending the Lions' Thanksgiving losing streak since 2016. After defeating the Packers, the Lions' 11-game winning streak ended with a 48–42 loss to the Buffalo Bills, despite Goff throwing for 494 yards, five touchdowns, and no interceptions, the first player to achieve those marks in a loss. After 300-yard, three touchdown performances against the Bears and 49ers, the Lions ended the season with a 31–9 victory over the Vikings in Week 18, clinching the NFC's top seed, back-to-back division titles, and a franchise-best 15–2 record.

Goff finished the regular season with 4,629 passing yards, 37 touchdowns, and 12 interceptions for a passer rating of 111.8 and a completion percentage of 72.4%. His touchdowns, passer rating, and completion percentages were all career highs. Goff finished second overall in passing yards, passer rating, completion percentage, and fourth in touchdown passes. He had repeatedly heard his name chanted at games on the road as fans "take over" stadiums throughout the season. The "Ja-red-Goff" chant has also been heard at other sports events and venues all over Michigan, and on a smaller level in the broader United States. Despite their historic regular season, the Lions were upset at home in the Divisional Round against the Washington Commanders, with Goff accounting for four of the Lions' five turnovers, including a pick-six, during the 45–31 loss. He was ranked 15th by his fellow players on the NFL Top 100 Players of 2025.

==== 2025 season ====
During Week 2, Goff completed 23-of-28 passes for 334 yards and five touchdowns in a 52–21 victory over the Chicago Bears. He was named NFC Offensive Player of the Week for his performance. Goff passed for 4,564 yards, 34 touchdowns, and eight interceptions as the Lions went 9–8 and missed the playoffs. He finished second in the NFL in passing yards and passing touchdowns. Goff was added to the 2026 Pro Bowl roster as a replacement for Sam Darnold. He was ranked 33rd by his fellow players on the NFL Top 100 Players of 2026.

== Career statistics ==
Legend
| | Led the league |
| **Bold** | Career high |

=== NFL ===
==== Regular season ====
| Year | Team | Games | | | Passing | | | | | | | | | Rushing | | | | | Sacked | | Fumbles | |
| Year | Team | GP | GS | Record | Cmp | Att | Pct | Yds | Y/A | Lng | TD | Int | Rtg | Att | Yds | Y/A | Lng | TD | Sck | SckY | Fum | Lost |
|---|---|---|---|---|---|---|---|---|---|---|---|---|---|---|---|---|---|---|---|---|---|---|
| 2016 | LAR | 7 | 7 | 0–7 | 112 | 205 | 54.6 | 1,089 | 5.3 | 66 | 5 | 7 | 63.6 | 8 | 16 | 2.0 | 6 | 1 | 26 | 222 | 5 | 2 |
| 2017 | LAR | 15 | 15 | 11–4 | 296 | 477 | 62.1 | 3,804 | 8.0 | **94** | 28 | 7 | 100.5 | 28 | 51 | 1.8 | 22 | 1 | 25 | 172 | 8 | 3 |
| 2018 | LAR | 16 | 16 | 13–3 | 364 | 561 | 64.9 | **4,688** | 8.4 | 70 | 32 | 12 | 101.1 | 43 | **108** | 2.5 | 16 | 2 | 33 | 223 | **12** | 5 |
| 2019 | LAR | 16 | 16 | 9–7 | 394 | **626** | 62.9 | 4,638 | 7.4 | 66 | 22 | **16** | 86.5 | 33 | 40 | 1.2 | 8 | 2 | 22 | 170 | 10 | 5 |
| 2020 | LAR | 15 | 15 | 9–6 | 370 | 552 | 67.0 | 3,952 | 7.2 | 56 | 20 | 13 | 90.0 | **51** | 99 | 1.9 | 10 | **4** | 23 | 161 | 7 | 4 |
| 2021 | DET | 14 | 14 | 3–10–1 | 332 | 494 | 67.2 | 3,245 | 6.6 | 63 | 19 | 8 | 91.5 | 17 | 87 | **5.1** | **26** | 0 | 35 | **280** | 9 | **6** |
| 2022 | DET | 17 | 17 | 9–8 | 382 | 587 | 65.1 | 4,438 | 7.6 | 81 | 29 | 7 | 99.3 | 29 | 73 | 2.5 | 14 | 0 | 23 | 156 | 7 | 4 |
| 2023 | DET | 17 | 17 | 12–5 | **407** | 605 | 67.3 | 4,575 | 7.6 | 70 | 30 | 12 | 97.9 | 32 | 21 | 0.7 | 11 | 2 | 30 | 197 | 6 | 4 |
| 2024 | DET | 17 | 17 | **15–2** | 390 | 539 | **72.4** | 4,629 | **8.6** | 82 | **37** | 12 | **111.8** | 35 | 56 | 1.6 | 10 | 0 | 31 | 234 | 6 | 0 |
| 2025 | DET | 17 | 17 | 9–8 | 393 | 578 | 68.0 | 4,564 | 7.9 | 64 | 34 | 8 | 105.5 | 19 | 45 | 2.4 | 24 | 0 | **38** | 259 | 6 | 5 |
| 2026 | DET | 9 | 9 | 7–2 | 205 | 304 | 67.4 | 2,437 | 8.0 | 57 | 18 | 4 | 105.9 | 20 | 23 | 1.2 | 6 | 1 | 21 | 136 | 6 | 0 |
| Career | | 160 | 160 | 97–62–1 | 3,645 | 5,528 | 65.9 | 42,059 | 7.6 | 94 | 274 | 106 | 97.3 | 315 | 619 | 2.0 | 26 | 13 | 307 | 2,210 | 82 | 38 |

==== Postseason ====
| Year | Team | Games | | | Passing | | | | | | | | | Rushing | | | | | Sacked | | Fumbles | |
| Year | Team | GP | GS | Record | Cmp | Att | Pct | Yds | Y/A | Lng | TD | Int | Rtg | Att | Yds | Y/A | Lng | TD | Sck | SckY | Fum | Lost |
|---|---|---|---|---|---|---|---|---|---|---|---|---|---|---|---|---|---|---|---|---|---|---|
| 2017 | LAR | 1 | 1 | 0–1 | 24 | 45 | 53.3 | 259 | 5.8 | 38 | 1 | 0 | 77.9 | 0 | 0 | 0.0 | 0 | 0 | 3 | 13 | 0 | 0 |
| 2018 | LAR | 3 | 3 | **2–1** | 59 | 106 | 55.7 | 712 | 6.7 | 39 | 1 | 2 | 71.7 | **9** | **22** | 2.4 | **11** | 0 | 5 | 39 | **2** | 0 |
| 2020 | LAR | 2 | 1 | 0–1 | 30 | 46 | 65.2 | 329 | 7.2 | **44** | 2 | 0 | 100.7 | 5 | 10 | 2.0 | 6 | 0 | 6 | 41 | 0 | 0 |
| 2023 | DET | 3 | 3 | **2–1** | **77** | **111** | **69.4** | **837** | 7.5 | 33 | **4** | 0 | **103.3** | **9** | 3 | 0.3 | 7 | 0 | **7** | **45** | 1 | 0 |
| 2024 | DET | 1 | 1 | 0–1 | 23 | 40 | 57.5 | 313 | **7.8** | 34 | 1 | **3** | 59.7 | 1 | 7 | **7.0** | 7 | 0 | 2 | 16 | 1 | **1** |
| Career | | 10 | 9 | 4–5 | 213 | 348 | 61.2 | 2,450 | 7.0 | 44 | 9 | 5 | 85.1 | 24 | 42 | 1.8 | 11 | 0 | 23 | 154 | 4 | 1 |

=== College ===
| Season | Team | Games | | | Passing | | | | | | | | Rushing | | | |
| Season | Team | GP | GS | Record | Cmp | Att | Pct | Yds | Y/A | TD | Int | Rtg | Att | Yds | Avg | TD |
|---|---|---|---|---|---|---|---|---|---|---|---|---|---|---|---|---|
| 2013 | California | 12 | 12 | 1–11 | 320 | **531** | 60.3 | 3,508 | 6.6 | 18 | 10 | 123.2 | **59** | **–62** | **–1.1** | **1** |
| 2014 | California | 12 | 12 | 5–7 | 316 | 509 | 62.1 | 3,973 | 7.8 | 35 | 7 | 147.6 | 55 | –44 | –0.8 | 0 |
| 2015 | California | 13 | 13 | **8–5** | **341** | 529 | **64.5** | **4,719** | **8.9** | **43** | **13** | **161.3** | 56 | –8 | –0.1 | 0 |
| Career | | 37 | 37 | 14–23 | 977 | 1,569 | 62.3 | 12,200 | 7.8 | 96 | 30 | 144.0 | 170 | –114 | –0.7 | 1 |

== Career highlights ==
=== Awards and honors ===
NFL

- NFC champion (2018)
- 5× Pro Bowl (2017, 2018, 2022, 2024, 2025)
- Pro Bowl Offensive MVP (2024)
- PFWA NFL Most Improved Player (2017)
- Madden Thanksgiving MVP (2024)
- Ranked No. 38 in the NFL Top 100 Players of 2018
- Ranked No. 32 in the NFL Top 100 Players of 2019
- Ranked No. 66 in the NFL Top 100 Players of 2023
- Ranked No. 48 in the NFL Top 100 Players of 2024
- Ranked No. 15 in the NFL Top 100 Players of 2025
- Ranked No. 33 in the NFL Top 100 Players of 2026
- 4× FedEx Air Player of the Week – Week 16, 2017, Week 15, 2021, Week 4, 2022, Week 14, 2022
- 6× NFC Offensive Player of the Week – 2017 (Week 9), 2018 (Week 4), 2019 (Week 13), 2021 (Week 13), 2023 (Week 6), 2024 (Week 4), 2025 (week 2)
- NFC Offensive Player of the Month – September 2018, October 2024

College

- First-team All-Pac-12 (2015)
- Armed Forces Bowl Most Valuable Player (2015)
- 2× Honorable mention All-Pac-12 (2013, 2014)
- Davey O'Brien Award semifinalist (2015)

=== Records ===
==== NFL records ====
- Most pass attempts with a perfect passer rating: 33 (tied with Deshaun Watson)
- Most pass attempts without an incompletion in a game: 18
- First quarterback in NFL history to complete 100% of his passes in a game on more than 10 pass attempts (September 30, 2024, against the Seattle Seahawks)

==== Lions franchise records ====
- Most consecutive passes without an interception: 324
- Highest touchdown-interception ratio: 4.14
- Lowest interception percentage in a single season: 1.2% (2022)
- Highest completion percentage in a post-season game: 81% (2023)
- Highest completion percentage in a single season: 72.4% (2024)
- Highest single season passer rating: 111.8 (2024)

==== Rams franchise records ====
- Most completed passes in a single game: 45 (September 29, 2019, against the Tampa Bay Buccaneers)
- Most 4th quarter comebacks in a single season: 4 (2018; tied with Norm Van Brocklin (1955), Jim Everett (1989), Marc Bulger (2003), and Sam Bradford (2012))

== Personal life ==
Goff has an enzyme deficiency that does not allow his body to break down proteins. Among other difficulties, it creates an inability to process red meat.

During the summer of 2019, Goff launched his own line of clothing called "JG16". In March 2020, Goff donated $250,000 to the Los Angeles Regional Food Bank during the coronavirus pandemic. Partnering with his clothing line "JG16" and Merit, Goff founded the Detroit Foundation, which donates profits to funding university scholarships.

Goff became engaged to longtime girlfriend Christen Harper on June 16, 2022. They met on the celebrity dating app Raya. Harper is the co-winner of the 2021 Sports Illustrated Swim Search for new models and was named co–rookie of the year following her 2022 appearance in the swimsuit issue. On June 22, 2024, Goff and Harper were married in a private ceremony in Ojai, California. Their daughter was born on July 15, 2025.

In 2024, Goff worked with the Give Merit’s FATE program at the Jalen Rose Leadership Academy. He contributed four-year scholarships to five students.

== See also ==
- List of NFL players who have posted a perfect passer rating
- List of Division I FBS passing yardage leaders
- List of first overall National Football League draft picks
- List of Detroit Lions starting quarterbacks
- List of Los Angeles Rams starting quarterbacks
