= Erik Kramer =

American gridiron football player (born 1964)

No. 10, 18, 12
- Position: Quarterback

Personal information
- Born: November 6, 1964 (age 62); Encino, California, U.S.
- Listed height: 6 ft 1 in (1.85 m)
- Listed weight: 204 lb (93 kg)

Career information
- High school: Burroughs (Burbank, California)
- College: Pierce CC (1983–1984); NC State (1985–1986)
- NFL draft: 1987: undrafted

Career history
- New Orleans Saints (1987)*; Atlanta Falcons (1987); Calgary Stampeders (1988–1990); Detroit Lions (1990–1993); Chicago Bears (1994–1998); San Diego Chargers (1999)
- * Offseason or practice squad member only

Awards and highlights
- ACC Player of the Year (1986); 2× First-team All-ACC (1985, 1986)

Career NFL statistics
- Passing attempts: 2,299
- Passing completions: 1,317
- Completion percentage: 57.3%
- TD–INT: 92–79
- Passing yards: 15,337
- Passer rating: 76.6
- Rushing yards: 217
- Rushing touchdowns: 5
- Stats at Pro Football Reference

William Erik Kramer (born November 6, 1964) is an American former professional football player who was a quarterback in the National Football League (NFL) and Canadian Football League (CFL). He attended Saint Genevieve High School in Burbank, California. After attending Pierce College and playing as their quarterback, Kramer transferred to North Carolina State University. He was not drafted by an NFL team, but did see action in 1987, when he played for the Atlanta Falcons as a replacement player during the NFL players strike. He would then spend some time in the CFL with the Calgary Stampeders. Kramer would return to the NFL in 1991, when he became a surprise starter for the Detroit Lions after injuries sidelined Rodney Peete. Kramer played in 13 games, led the Lions to a 12–4 record, their first playoff victory since 1957, and a trip to the NFC Championship Game.

== Early life ==
William Erik Kramer was born November 6, 1964, in Encino, California. He attended John Burroughs High School in Burbank, California.

== College career ==
Kramer played quarterback at Pierce College, but became interested in transferring to NC State when the school won the national basketball title. He played two seasons for NC State, starting all 11 games both seasons. His 1985 junior season he compiled just a 3–8 record, though he led the ACC in completions (189), attempts (339), and passing yards (2,510). His senior year, despite slightly less offensive output (145–227 for 2,092 yards), saw the team improve to 8–3–1. This included a dramatic Hail Mary game-winning pass to defeat South Carolina in game 8 to take them to their highest ranking of the season at 15th. On the season, Kramer had 14 passing touchdowns and ran for five more, and was named ACC Player of the Year. Though NC State lost the 1986 Peach Bowl by one point to Virginia Tech, Kramer was still named player of the game.

== Professional career ==
=== New Orleans Saints ===
Kramer signed with New Orleans Saints as an undrafted free agent in 1987 following the 1987 NFL draft.

=== Atlanta Falcons ===
After being released by the Saints, he signed with the Atlanta Falcons in 1987 during the player strike. He appeared in three games as one of five quarterbacks to start for the Falcons that season. In the last of these, he set four franchise rookie records with 27 completions on 46 attempts for 335 yards and three touchdowns.

=== Calgary Stampeders ===
He played with the Calgary Stampeders of the Canadian Football League (CFL) for three years from 1988 to 1990. He threw for 964 yards, five touchdowns, and thirteen interceptions.

=== Detroit Lions ===
After his three-year stint in the CFL, he returned to the NFL in 1991 as a some-time starter for the Detroit Lions, compiling a 10–5 record over three seasons. Kramer's nickname in Detroit was "Brass", a media-friendly redaction of "brass balls". The moniker apparently originated after Kramer called an audible on his first series as Lions' quarterback, having just replaced the injured Rodney Peete. One Lions' offensive lineman turned to another and said, "This guy's got brass balls." Kramer proved to be quite successful as a signal-caller in 1991 and the nickname stuck. His other nickname was "Cosmo", which was due to him having the same last name as the character Cosmo Kramer from the popular TV show, Seinfeld. He shared QB duties with Peete and Andre Ware. In the 1991 playoffs, he led the team to a 38–6 drubbing of the Dallas Cowboys, on a franchise postseason record 29 completions for 341 yards and three touchdowns. He also had the team's only touchdown in a loss to the Washington Redskins in the championship game. Combined with a loss in the 1993 postseason, he holds the career franchise postseason records for touchdowns (5 with Tobin Rote), passer rating (99.2), sacks (9), and yards per attempt (8.2) as well.

=== Chicago Bears ===
In 1994, he signed as a free agent with the Chicago Bears, and spent the next five years there. In his two full seasons as a starter (1995 and 1997), Kramer was highly productive and passed for over 3,000 yards. Kramer became the all-time Chicago Bears leader in single-season passing yards, throwing for 3,838 yards in 1995. This record stood for 30 years until it was broken by Caleb Williams in 2025. Kramer still holds the all-time Chicago Bears record for passing touchdowns in a single season with 29.

=== San Diego Chargers ===
Kramer signed with the San Diego Chargers in the 1999 offseason, but retired midseason due to a neck injury. Though he also missed much of the 1996 season with a neck injury, the two injuries were unrelated.

Kramer finished his 10 NFL seasons with 1,317 completions for 15,337 yards and 92 touchdowns, with 79 interceptions. He also rushed for 217 rushing yards and 5 touchdowns.

== Career statistics ==
=== NFL ===
Legend
**Bold**	Career high

==== Regular season ====
Year	Team	Games			Passing									Rushing					Sacks		Fumbles	
Year	Team	GP	GS	Record	Cmp	Att	Pct	Yds	Y/A	Lng	TD	Int	Rtg	Att	Yds	Y/A	Lng	TD	Sck	Yds	Fum	Lost
1987	ATL	3	2	1–1	45	92	48.9	559	6.1	33	4	5	60.0	2	10	**5.0**	11	0	10	82	0	0
1991	DET	13	8	6–2	136	265	51.3	1,635	6.2	73	11	8	71.8	**35**	26	0.7	12	1	14	74	8	4
1992	DET	7	3	1–2	58	106	54.7	771	7.3	77	4	8	59.1	12	34	2.8	11	0	15	80	4	3
1993	DET	5	4	3–1	87	138	**63.0**	1,002	7.3	48	8	3	**95.1**	10	5	0.5	4	0	5	35	1	1
1994	CHI	6	5	1–4	99	158	62.7	1,129	7.1	**85**	8	8	79.9	6	-2	-0.3	2	0	14	87	3	1
1995	CHI	16	16	**9–7**	**315**	**522**	60.3	**3,838**	**7.4**	76	**29**	10	93.5	**35**	39	1.1	11	1	15	95	6	4
1996	CHI	4	4	1–3	73	150	48.7	781	5.2	58	3	6	54.3	8	4	0.5	3	0	7	53	1	0
1997	CHI	15	13	4–9	275	477	57.7	3,011	6.3	78	14	**14**	74.0	27	**83**	3.1	**31**	**2**	**25**	**149**	**11**	**8**
1998	CHI	8	8	3–5	151	250	60.4	1,823	7.3	79	9	7	83.1	13	17	1.3	8	1	10	71	3	3
1999	SD	6	4	2–2	78	141	55.3	788	5.6	41	2	10	46.6	5	1	0.2	3	0	7	62	3	2
Career		83	67	31–36	1,317	2,299	57.3	15,337	6.7	85	92	79	76.6	153	217	1.4	31	5	122	788	40	26

==== Postseason ====
Year	Team	Games			Passing									Rushing					Sacks		Fumbles	
Year	Team	GP	GS	Record	Cmp	Att	Pct	Yds	Y/A	Lng	TD	Int	Rtg	Att	Yds	Y/A	Lng	TD	Sck	Yds	Fum	Lost
1991	DET	2	2	**1–1**	**50**	**71**	70.4	**590**	**8.3**	**32**	**4**	1	**108.3**	**4**	**4**	**1.0**	**3**	0	**5**	30	**3**	**3**
1993	DET	1	1	0–1	22	31	**71.0**	248	8.0	31	1	**2**	78.4	1	1	**1.0**	1	0	4	13	1	1
1994	CHI	1	0	0–0	19	28	67.9	161	5.8	20	1	0	94.5	0	0	0.0	0	0	4	**31**	0	0
Career		4	3	1–2	91	130	70.0	999	7.7	32	6	3	98.2	5	5	1.0	3	0	13	74	4	4

=== College ===
Season	Team	GP	Passing								Rushing			
Season	Team	GP	Cmp	Att	Pct	Yds	Y/A	TD	Int	Rtg	Att	Yds	Avg	TD
1985	NC State	11	189	339	55.8	2,510	7.4	16	12	126.4	90	-258	-2.9	1
1986	NC State	11	145	277	52.3	2,092	7.6	14	16	120.9	74	79	1.1	5
Career		22	334	616	54.2	4,602	7.5	30	28	124.0	164	-179	-1.1	6

== Post-playing career ==
After retiring from the NFL, Kramer went into sports broadcasting, covering the Detroit Lions as an in-studio analyst and then the Chicago Bears.

Kramer appeared as himself in an episode of Married... with Children, during which the series' protagonist, Al Bundy, sells his soul in order to lead the Bears to the Super Bowl.

On October 30, 2011, Kramer's 18-year-old son, Griffen, a senior at Thousand Oaks High School, was found dead at a friend's home from a heroin overdose. Sheriff's investigators charged four people, including two juveniles, with involuntary manslaughter and possession of a controlled substance.

On August 18, 2015, Kramer attempted suicide by renting a hotel room several miles away from his home and shooting himself in the head. Because of his inexperience with firearms, the shot failed to inflict a fatal wound and Kramer survived. According to Kramer's ex-wife, her husband has a "beautiful soul" but is not the same man she married due to head injuries suffered during his time as an NFL quarterback. Kramer attributed the suicide attempt to existing depression, made worse by Griffen's death and the deaths of both of his parents from cancer. The antidepressants Kramer had been taking to manage his depression were no longer effective nor were any other attempts to treat his condition. Kramer did not rule out that head injuries were a factor in his worsening mood but also noted that he lacked the ability to assess whether close family members truly loved him or knew he loved them even before his playing career.

In the months following the event, a woman named Cortney Baird convinced Kramer to marry her despite Kramer admittedly having the mental capacity of a preschooler at the time and the courts consented to the marriage. However, per legal documents obtained by TMZ Sports, Kramer said he "suffered a traumatic brain injury" after attempting suicide in 2015 that "left him with a lack of mental capacity to legally consent to marriage."

On June 13, 2018, Baird called police and reported Kramer had committed domestic violence. In February 2020, Los Angeles County dropped the domestic violence charges against Kramer but Baird was arrested and charged with 12 felonies, including counts of elder abuse, identity theft and forgery. In petitioning to have his marriage annulled, Kramer said Baird stole $50,000 from him before they were married. Kramer added that Baird "exerted undue influence upon me to convince me, given my weakened mental state, that her actions were not wrongful" before the couple got married in 2016. On January 28, 2019, a Superior Court judge in Los Angeles annulled the marriage.

Kramer eventually regained his mental faculties in 2020, describing the event as a "wak(ing) up." The extensive rehabilitation also cured Kramer of his long-existing depression to the point where he now, as of 2021, lives a largely normal life.

Kramer wrote a book with journalist William Croyle, The Ultimate Comeback: Surviving a Suicide Attempt, Conquering Depression and Living with a Purpose.

On June 25, 2024, Cortney Baird pled guilty to four felony counts: Count 4 [PC 368(d)] theft from an elder/dependent adult; Count 5 PC 470 forgery; Count 10 PC 530.5 identity theft; Count 11 PC 368(d) theft from an elder/dependent adult. Additionally, Cortney Baird admitted to: PC 186.11 allegation taking of over $100,000 PC 803(c) allegation (related to statute of limitations – tolling): RC 4.421 circumstances in aggravation – taking advantage of a position of trust, vulnerable victim, large monetary loss, crime involved sophistication and planning. Cortney Baird was placed on 10 years felony probation, sentenced to 180 days in jail, no working as a caregiver or managing finances of others during probation and Erik Kramer received a 10-year criminal protection order. Courtney Baird received six months' prison time after agreeing to pay restitution of $170,000.
