= Reggie Barrett =

American football player (born 1969)

No. 40
- Position: Wide receiver

Personal information
- Born: August 14, 1969 (age 57); Corpus Christi, Texas, U.S.
- Listed height: 6 ft 3 in (1.91 m)
- Listed weight: 214 lb (97 kg)

Career information
- High school: Roy Miller (Corpus Christi)
- College: UTEP
- NFL draft: 1991: 3rd round, 58th overall pick

Career history
- Detroit Lions (1991–1993); Seattle Seahawks (1994)

Awards and highlights
- First-team All-WAC (1989); Second-team All-WAC (1990)

Career NFL statistics
- Receptions: 4
- Receiving yards: 67
- Touchdowns: 1
- Stats at Pro Football Reference

Aaron Reginald Barrett (born August 14, 1969) is an American former professional football player who was a wide receiver in the National Football League (NFL) who played for the Detroit Lions. The Lions selected him 58th overall in the third round of the 1991 NFL draft. He played college football for the UTEP Miners.
