= Don Overton =

American football player (born 1967)

No. 29, 33
- Position: Running back

Personal information
- Born: September 24, 1967 (age 59); Columbus, Ohio, U.S.
- Listed height: 6 ft 0 in (1.83 m)
- Listed weight: 221 lb (100 kg)

Career information
- High school: Whitehall-Yearling
- College: Fairmont State
- NFL draft: 1990: undrafted

Career history
- New England Patriots (1990); Detroit Lions (1991); Philadelphia Eagles (1992)*; Detroit Lions (1992); Cincinnati Bengals (1993)*
- * Offseason or practice squad member only

Career NFL statistics
- Rushing yards: 67
- Rushing average: 3.5
- Receptions: 6
- Receiving yards: 57
- Stats at Pro Football Reference

Don Overton (September 24, 1967) is an American former professional football player who was a running back for three seasons in the National Football League (NFL) with the New England Patriots and Detroit Lions. He played college football for the Fairmont State Fighting Falcons.
