= Darryl Milburn =

American football player (born 1968)

No. 79, 78
- Position: Defensive end

Personal information
- Born: October 25, 1968 (age 58); Baton Rouge, Louisiana, U.S.
- Listed height: 6 ft 3 in (1.91 m)
- Listed weight: 260 lb (118 kg)

Career information
- High school: McKinley (Baton Rouge)
- College: Grambling State
- NFL draft: 1991: 9th round, 231st overall pick

Career history
- Detroit Lions (1991–1992); Toronto Argonauts (1992–1993); New Orleans Saints (1994)*; Arizona Cardinals (1994)*; Anaheim Piranhas (1996–1997); Tampa Bay Storm (1998)
- * Offseason or practice squad member only

Career NFL statistics
- Games played: 2
- Stats at Pro Football Reference

Career CFL statistics
- Games played: 5
- Tackles: 9
- Sacks: 1

Career AFL statistics
- Games played: 15
- Stats at ArenaFan.com

Darryl Wayne Milburn (born October 25, 1968) is an American former gridiron football player. A defensive end, he played college football for the Grambling State Tigers and was selected in the ninth round of the 1991 NFL draft by the Detroit Lions; he appeared in two games for the team. Milburn played for the Toronto Argonauts of the Canadian Football League (CFL) in 1992 and 1993, before spending time with the New Orleans Saints and Arizona Cardinals in 1994. He then moved on to the Arena Football League (AFL), playing for the Anaheim Piranhas in 1996 and 1997, then as a member of the Tampa Bay Storm in 1998.

== Early life and education ==
Milburn was born on October 25, 1968, in Baton Rouge, Louisiana. He attended McKinley High School and, at 6 ft 3 in and 230 lb, played wide receiver and free safety. He was recruited to various schools, including major teams such as Georgia Southern, LSU, Georgia, Alabama and Tulane, as well as his hometown college Southern. However, he chose to play for Grambling State, citing his liking of their coach Eddie Robinson.

Milburn began attending Grambling State University in 1987 and spent his first season with the Tigers playing tight end. However, he was told by coach Robinson that the team needed someone to rush the passer and Milburn began spending more time in the weight room training to play defensive end. He was able to increase his weight to 264 lb, grew two inches, and became one of the team's top defenders and highest regarded players. Despite his size, coaches still noted that he was among the top four fastest players on the team. Milburn graduated following the 1990 season.

== Professional career ==
Milburn was selected in the ninth round (213th overall) of the 1991 NFL draft by the Detroit Lions. He received a contract on July 11 but was released on August 19. Shortly thereafter, he was re-signed to the practice roster. Milburn spent the majority of the season there before receiving promotion for the final two games against the Green Bay Packers and Buffalo Bills. He appeared in both games and also in their first playoff match-up against the Dallas Cowboys; he was inactive for the second, a loss to the Washington Redskins, due to a hamstring injury. Milburn became an unprotected free agent after the season and was later waived on August 25, 1992.

In September 1992, Milburn was added to the practice roster of the Toronto Argonauts of the Canadian Football League (CFL). He was later activated and made his CFL debut on his 24th birthday, appearing in the Argonauts' loss to the Winnipeg Blue Bombers. Following the game, Milburn was placed on the injury list; he did not appear in any further games for Toronto that season.

Milburn was released by Toronto at the start of July 1993 and afterwards returned as a member of the practice roster. After the Toronto defense allowed 55 points in week seven against the BC Lions, Milburn was promoted to the active roster and was made a starter in an attempt to improve the team. After having appeared in four games, he was released on October 1. Milburn finished his stint at Toronto with five total games played, nine tackles, including three for-loss, and one sack. His salary with the team was $60,000.

Milburn was signed by the New Orleans Saints in 1994 but was waived on July 16. Afterwards, he was claimed by the Arizona Cardinals but was again waived on August 23. Milburn joined the Anaheim Piranhas of the Arena Football League (AFL) in 1996, after spending a year out of football. He became one of their top linemen, helping the team lead the league in sacks. While appearing in all 14 games for the Piranhas, who reached the AFL playoffs, he posted seven sacks, made two pass deflections, recovered a fumble, and also caught two receptions for 36 yards and a touchdown. He appeared in one game for Anaheim in 1997 before being placed on injured reserve, having made one tackle and one reception for four yards. After the Piranhas folded, Milburn was selected by the Tampa Bay Storm in the AFL dispersal draft. He was placed on the injured reserve list prior to the regular season, however, and was released in December 1998.
