= Cedric Jackson (American football) =

American football player (born 1968)

No. 30
- Position: Running back

Personal information
- Born: January 13, 1968 (age 58); Texarkana, Texas, U.S.
- Listed height: 5 ft 11 in (1.80 m)
- Listed weight: 229 lb (104 kg)

Career information
- High school: Liberty-Eylau (Texarkana)
- College: Tyler JC (1986–1987); TCU (1988–1990)
- NFL draft: 1991: 8th round, 205th overall pick

Career history
- Detroit Lions (1991); San Diego Chargers (1992)*
- * Offseason or practice squad member only

Awards and highlights
- First-team All-TJCFC (1987)

Career NFL statistics
- Games played: 8
- Games started: 1
- Rushing yards: 55
- Receptions: 1
- Receiving yards: -2
- Return yards: 9
- Stats at Pro Football Reference

Cedric Anthony Jackson (born January 13, 1968) is an American former professional football running back who played in the National Football League (NFL) for the Detroit Lions and San Diego Chargers. He played college football for the Tyler Apaches and TCU Horned Frogs.

== Early life ==
Jackson was born on January 13, 1968, in Texarkana, Texas. He attended Liberty-Eylau High School in Texarkana, where he played football and track and field. Jackson committed to play college football at Tyler Junior College.

== College career ==
Jackson played college football for the Tyler Apaches from 1986 to 1987 and TCU Horned Frogs from 1988 to 1990. He played at fullback his freshman year before transitioning to tailback as a sophomore. Jackson rushed for 750 yards and ten touchdowns, earning first-team All-TJCFC honors. On December 9, 1987, he transferred to Texas Christian University.

In his first season at TCU, Jackson had 467 rushing yards for four touchdowns with six receptions for 29 yards. In 1989, he played in two games before he suffered a season-ending knee injury against Texas A&M. Jackson was awarded an extra year due to his injury. He rushed for 105 yards and one touchdown with six catches for 57 yards. As a senior, Jackson appeared in 11 games, rushing for 27 yards and a touchdown while adding 22 receptions for 242 yards and four touchdowns. He played in the 1990 Blue–Gray Football Classic.

== Professional career ==
=== Detroit Lions ===
Jackson was selected in the eighth round, with the 205th overall selection, by the Detroit Lions in the 1991 NFL draft. On July 10, he signed his rookie contract with the team. Jackson started in the first game of the season, rushing ten times for 39 yards and one lost fumble. He played in seven further games, totaling 55 rushing yards with one catch for -2 yards and nine return yards. On November 4, Jackson was placed on season-ending injured reserve with a shoulder injury. On February 1, 1992, he became a free agent.

=== San Diego Chargers ===
On March 11, 1992, Jackson was signed by the San Diego Chargers. On August 25, he was released by the team.
