= Detroit Lions draft history =

The Detroit Lions are a professional American football team based in Detroit, Michigan. The Lions compete in the National Football League (NFL) as a member of the North Division of the National Football Conference. The franchise was founded in Portsmouth, Ohio, as the Portsmouth Spartans and joined the NFL on July 12, 1930. After being purchased by George A. Richards in 1934, the franchise was relocated to Detroit and renamed to the Detroit Lions in reference to the city's Major League Baseball franchise, the Detroit Tigers. The team plays its home games at Ford Field in Downtown Detroit. The Lions took part in the first NFL draft of college football players in 1936 and have participated in every NFL draft since. With the eighth pick of the first round of the 1936 draft, Sid Wagner, a guard from Michigan State University, became the Lions' first draft selection.

When a team selects a player, the team receives exclusive rights to sign that player to a contract and no other team in the league may sign them, with limited exceptions. From 1936 to 1959, the NFL draft was the only collegiate draft for players of American football, except for that of the short-lived All-America Football Conference (AAFC) in the late 1940s. However, starting in 1960, the newly-formed American Football League (AFL) began a competing draft of the same group of collegiate players. The NFL and AFL competed for the same players from 1960 to 1966, creating a bidding war for signing draft picks and players that threatened the financial sustainability of each league. In 1967, the AFL and NFL announced a merger that would be finalized in 1970. During this time, both leagues implemented a common draft, thus avoiding competition for signing draftees. In addition to the annual draft, special drafts have occurred. These included the 1950 AAFC dispersal draft and the 1984 NFL supplemental draft, where existing NFL teams, including the Lions, were able to select players from other leagues. The AAFC dispersal draft was organized after the AAFC merged with the NFL; three teams from the AAFC were admitted into the NFL, while most of the remaining players from the other five AAFC teams were placed in the dispersal draft. The 1984 supplemental draft occurred after the formation of the United States Football League (USFL) with the primary purpose of selecting players that had already signed with a USFL team in a separate process from the annual draft. The Canadian Football League (CFL) was also included in this supplemental draft. In addition to the 1984 supplemental draft, the NFL has hosted an annual supplemental draft since 1977 for players who had circumstances affect their eligibility for the NFL draft. The Lions have only selected a player once in a supplemental draft, taking Kevin Robinson in the ninth round in 1982. With this selection, the Lions forfeited their normal ninth-round pick in the 1983 NFL draft. Additionally, eight expansion drafts occurred, with the most recent in 2002, where newly formed NFL teams were allowed to draft players from existing NFL teams within certain limitations.

Throughout the history of the NFL draft, the number of rounds and the number of picks have fluctuated significantly, depending on the number of teams in the NFL. Thus with 32 teams in the NFL since 2002, there have been 32 standard draft picks per round. The number of rounds peaked to 32 in the years during and after World War II, although that number has been routinely reduced down to the current seven rounds per draft. The order of the draft selection is derived from the previous season's final standings, with the worst team in the league selecting first and the champion selecting last. However, for 12 years from 1947 to 1958, the first overall pick was chosen by a lottery, with that selection replacing what would have been the team's original first-round selection based on their record the previous season. When a team won the lottery, they were then removed from the next year's lottery. The Lions won the lottery pick in the 1950 NFL draft, using their bonus pick to select Leon Hart, an end from Notre Dame.

The Lions have selected 15 players who were eventually elected to the Pro Football Hall of Fame. Five of these players—Fred Biletnikoff, Otto Graham, Johnny Robinson, Mac Speedie, and Y. A. Tittle—chose not to play for the Lions and instead signed for teams in competing leagues. Seven of the Lions' draft picks have won the Associated Press NFL Rookie of the Year Award: Lem Barney (1967), Mel Farr (1967), Earl McCullouch (1968), Al Baker (1978), Billy Sims (1980), Barry Sanders (1989), and Ndamukong Suh (2010). The Lions have drafted first overall four times, selecting Frank Sinkwich in 1943, Leon Hart in 1950, Billy Sims in 1980, and Matthew Stafford in 2009. They have also drafted at second overall six times: Glenn Davis in 1947, John Rauch in 1949, Charles Rogers in 2003, Calvin Johnson in 2007, Ndamukong Suh in 2010, and Aidan Hutchinson in 2022. The Lions participated in the most recent draft in 2026, selecting seven players over seven rounds, including Blake Miller as their first-round draft pick.

== Draft history by year ==
Each team is given a position in the drafting order in reverse order relative to its record in the previous season, which means that the last place team is positioned first and the season's champion is last. From this position, the team can either select a player or trade its position to another team for other draft positions, a player or players, or any combination thereof. The round is complete when all of the round's picks have been used to select a player.

Certain aspects of the draft, including team positioning and the number of rounds in the draft, have been revised since its creation, but the fundamental method has remained the same. Currently, the draft consists of seven rounds.

Detroit Lions draft history by year
Draft	Rounds	Original draft order (Note: Draft orders change based on trades and other factors. This is the original draft order based on the previous season's record.)	Total selections	First-round pick(s)	Refs
1936	9	8th	9	Sid Wagner	
1937	10	7th	10	Lloyd Cardwell	
1938	12	6th	10	Alex Wojciechowicz	
1939	22	7th	20	John Pingel	
1940	22	6th	20	Doyle Nave	
1941	22	5th	20	Jim Thomason	
1942	22	5th	20	Bob Westfall	
1943	32	1st	30	Frank Sinkwich	
1944	32	4th	30	Otto Graham	
1945	32	6th	30	Frank Szymanski	
1946	32	8th	30	Bill Dellastatious	
1947	32	2nd	30	Glenn Davis	
1948	32	3rd	28	Y. A. Tittle	
1949	25	2nd	23	John Rauch	
1950 dispersal	10	4th	10	Robert Hoernschemeyer	
1950	30	5th	31	Leon Hart	
1950	30	5th	31	Joe Watson	
1951	30	8th	28	No pick	
1952	30	9th	27	No pick	
1953	30	13th	28	Harley Sewell	
1954	30	13th	32	Dick Chapman	
1955	30	12th	33	Dave Middleton	
1956	30	3rd	30	Howard Cassady	
1957	30	12th	30	Bill Glass	
1958	30	10th	32	Alex Karras	
1959	30	6th	32	Nick Pietrosante	
1960	20	3rd	20	Johnny Robinson	
1961	20	10th	19	No pick	
1962	20	10th	22	John Hadl	
1963	20	12th	18	Daryl Sanders	
1964	20	5th	21	Pete Beathard	
1965	20	11th	23	Tom Nowatzke	
1966	20	8th	21	No pick	
1967	17	7th	16	Mel Farr	
1968	17	11th	16	Greg Landry	
1968	17	11th	16	Earl McCullouch	
1969	17	8th	14	No pick	
1970	17	19th	15	Steve Owens	
1971	17	21st	18	Bob Bell	
1972	17	16th	14	Herb Orvis	
1973	17	19th	20	Ernie Price	
1974	17	13th	16	Ed O'Neil	
1975	17	13th	17	Lynn Boden	
1976	17	16th	19	James Hunter	
1976	17	16th	19	Lawrence Gaines	
1977	12	12th	11	No pick	
1978	12	11th	15	Luther Bradley	
1979	12	10th	11	Keith Dorney	
1980	12	1st	13	Billy Sims	
1981	12	16th	12	Mark Nichols	
1982	12	15th	15 (Note: This total count includes 14 selections in the 1982 NFL draft and one supplemental pick made prior to the 1983 NFL draft.)	Jimmy Williams	
1983	12	13th	12 (Note: This total count does not include one supplemental pick made prior to the 1983 NFL draft.)	James Jones	
1984	12	20th	15	David Lewis	
1984 supplemental	3	20th	3	Al Williams	
1985	12	6th	12	Lomas Brown	
1986	12	12th	10	Chuck Long	
1987	12	7th	10	Reggie Rogers	
1988	12	2nd	13	Bennie Blades	
1989	12	3rd	12	Barry Sanders	
1990	12	7th	14	Andre Ware	
1991	12	10th	10	Herman Moore	
1992	12	26th	7	Robert Porcher	
1993	8	8th	6	No pick	
1994	7	21st	7	Johnnie Morton	
1995	7	20th	8	Luther Elliss	
1996	7	23rd	5	Reggie Brown	
1996	7	23rd	5	Jeff Hartings	
1997	7	5th	10	Bryant Westbrook	
1998	7	20th	5	Terry Fair	
1999	7	9th	7	Chris Claiborne	
1999	7	9th	7	Aaron Gibson	
2000	7	20th	6	Stockar McDougle	
2001	7	18th	6	Jeff Backus	
2002	7	3rd	9	Joey Harrington	
2003	7	2nd	11	Charles Rogers	
2004	7	6th	6	Roy Williams	
2004	7	6th	6	Kevin Jones	
2005	7	10th	6	Mike Williams	
2006	7	9th	7	Ernie Sims	
2007	7	2nd	8	Calvin Johnson	
2008	7	15th	9	Gosder Cherilus	
2009	7	1st	10	Matthew Stafford	
2009	7	1st	10	Brandon Pettigrew	
2010	7	2nd	6	Ndamukong Suh	
2010	7	2nd	6	Jahvid Best	
2011	7	13th	5	Nick Fairley	
2012	7	23rd	8	Riley Reiff	
2013	7	5th	9	Ezekiel Ansah	
2014	7	10th	8	Eric Ebron	
2015	7	23rd	7	Laken Tomlinson	
2016	7	16th	10	Taylor Decker	
2017	7	21st	9	Jarrad Davis	
2018	7	20th	6	Frank Ragnow	
2019	7	8th	9	T. J. Hockenson	
2020	7	3th	9	Jeff Okudah	
2021	7	7th	7	Penei Sewell	
2022	7	2nd	8	Aidan Hutchinson	
2022	7	2nd	8	Jameson Williams	
2023	7	18th	8	Jahmyr Gibbs	
2023	7	18th	8	Jack Campbell	
2024	7	29th	6	Terrion Arnold	
2025	7	28th	7	Tyleik Williams	
2026	7	17th	7	Blake Miller	
