= Detroit Lions draft picks (1970–present) =

The Detroit Lions are a professional American football team based in Detroit, Michigan. The Lions compete in the National Football League (NFL) as a member of the North Division of the National Football Conference. The franchise was founded in Portsmouth, Ohio, as the Portsmouth Spartans and joined the NFL on July 12, 1930. After being purchased by George A. Richards in 1934, the franchise was relocated to Detroit and renamed to the Detroit Lions in reference to the city's Major League Baseball franchise, the Detroit Tigers. The team plays its home games at Ford Field in Downtown Detroit.

The NFL draft, officially known as the "NFL Annual Player Selection Meeting", is an annual event which serves as the league's most common source of player recruitment. The draft order is determined based on the previous season's standings; the teams with the worst win–loss records receive the earliest picks. Teams that qualified for the NFL playoffs select after non-qualifiers, and their order depends on how far they advanced, using their regular season record as a tie-breaker. The final two selections in the first round are reserved for the Super Bowl runner-up and champion. Draft picks are tradable and players or other picks can be acquired with them.

In 1970, the Lions took part in the first modern NFL draft after the completion of the AFL–NFL merger. With the nineteenth pick of the first round of that draft, Steve Owens, a running back out of Oklahoma University, became the Lions' first modern draft selection. In addition to the annual draft, the Lions participated in the 1984 NFL supplemental draft. This supplemental draft occurred after the formation of the United States Football League (USFL), with the primary purpose of selecting players that had already signed with a USFL team in a separate process from the annual draft. The Canadian Football League (CFL) was also included in this supplemental draft. In addition to the 1984 supplemental draft, the NFL has hosted an annual supplemental draft since 1977 for players who had circumstances affect their eligibility for the NFL draft. The Lions have only selected a player once in a supplemental draft, taking Kevin Robinson in the ninth round in 1982. Two players drafted by the Lions since 1970 have been inducted into the Pro Football Hall of Fame: Barry Sanders and Calvin Johnson. The Lions have taken part in every modern NFL draft since 1970, doing so most recently in the 2025 NFL draft, where they drafted seven players.

== Key ==
Key
†	Indicates the player was inducted into the Pro Football Hall of Fame

== 1970 draft ==
Detroit Lions' selections in the 1970 NFL draftSource: Pro Football Reference
Round	Pick #	Overall	Name	Position (Note: Position reflects the source for each table (Pro Football Reference) and may not be representative of a player's college position or current position.)	College
1	19	19	Steve Owens	Running back	Oklahoma
2	19	45	Ray Parson	Tackle	Minnesota
3	19	71	Jim Mitchell	Defensive end	Virginia State
5	19	123	Bob Parker	Guard	Memphis
6	19	149	Tony Terry	Defensive tackle	USC
7	19	175	Ken Geddes	Linebacker	Nebraska
9	19	227	Herman Weaver	Punter	Tennessee
10	19	253	Bruce Maxwell	Running back	Arkansas
11	19	279	Roger Laird	Defensive back	Kentucky State
12	19	305	Emanuel Murrell	Defensive back	Cal Poly-San Luis Obispo
13	19	331	Dave Haverdick	Defensive tackle	Morehead State
14	19	357	Charlie Brown	Wide receiver	Northern Arizona
15	19	383	Bob Haney	Tackle	Idaho
16	19	409	Jerry Todd	Defensive back	Memphis
17	19	435	Jesse Marshall	Defensive tackle	Centenary

== 1971 draft ==
Detroit Lions' selections in the 1971 NFL draftSource: Pro Football Reference
Round	Pick #	Overall	Name	Position	College
1	21	21	Bob Bell	Defensive tackle	Cincinnati
2	4	30	Dave Thompson	Tackle	Clemson
2	22	48	Charlie Weaver	Linebacker	USC
3	20	72	Al Clark	Defensive back	Eastern Michigan
4	22	100	Larry Woods	Defensive tackle	Tennessee State
5	21	125	Pete Newell	Guard	Michigan
6	20	150	Frank Harris	Quarterback	Boston College
6	22	152	Herman Franklin	Wide receiver	USC
7	21	177	Brownie Wheless	Tackle	Rice
8	22	204	Ken Lee	Linebacker	Washington
9	21	229	Mickey Zofko	Running back	Auburn
11	21	281	Phil Webb	Defensive back	Colorado State
12	22	308	Bill Pilconis	Wide receiver	Pittsburgh
13	20	332	David Abercrombie	Running back	Tulane
14	22	360	Tom Lorenz	Tight end	Iowa State
15	21	385	Ed Coates	Wide receiver	Central Missouri State
16	21	411	Tom Kutschinski	Defensive back	Michigan State
17	20	436	Gordon Jolley	Guard	Utah

== 1972 draft ==
Detroit Lions' selections in the 1972 NFL draftSource: Pro Football Reference
Round	Pick #	Overall	Name	Position	College
1	16	16	Herb Orvis	Defensive tackle	Colorado
3	13	65	Ken Sanders	Defensive end	Howard Payne
6	15	145	Charlie Potts	Defensive back	Purdue
7	16	172	Charles Stoudamire	Wide receiver	Portland State
8	15	197	Henry Stuckey	Defensive back	Missouri
9	16	224	Bill McClintock	Defensive back	Drake
10	15	249	Jim Teal	Linebacker	Purdue
11	16	276	Bob Waldron	Defensive tackle	Tulane
12	15	301	Paul Bradley	Wide receiver	SMU
13	16	328	John Kirschner	Tight end	Memphis
14	15	353	Eric Kelly	Tackle	Whitworth
15	16	380	Steve Roach	Linebacker	Kansas
16	15	405	Leon Jenkins	Defensive back	West Virginia
17	16	432	Mike Tyler	Defensive back	Rice

== 1973 draft ==
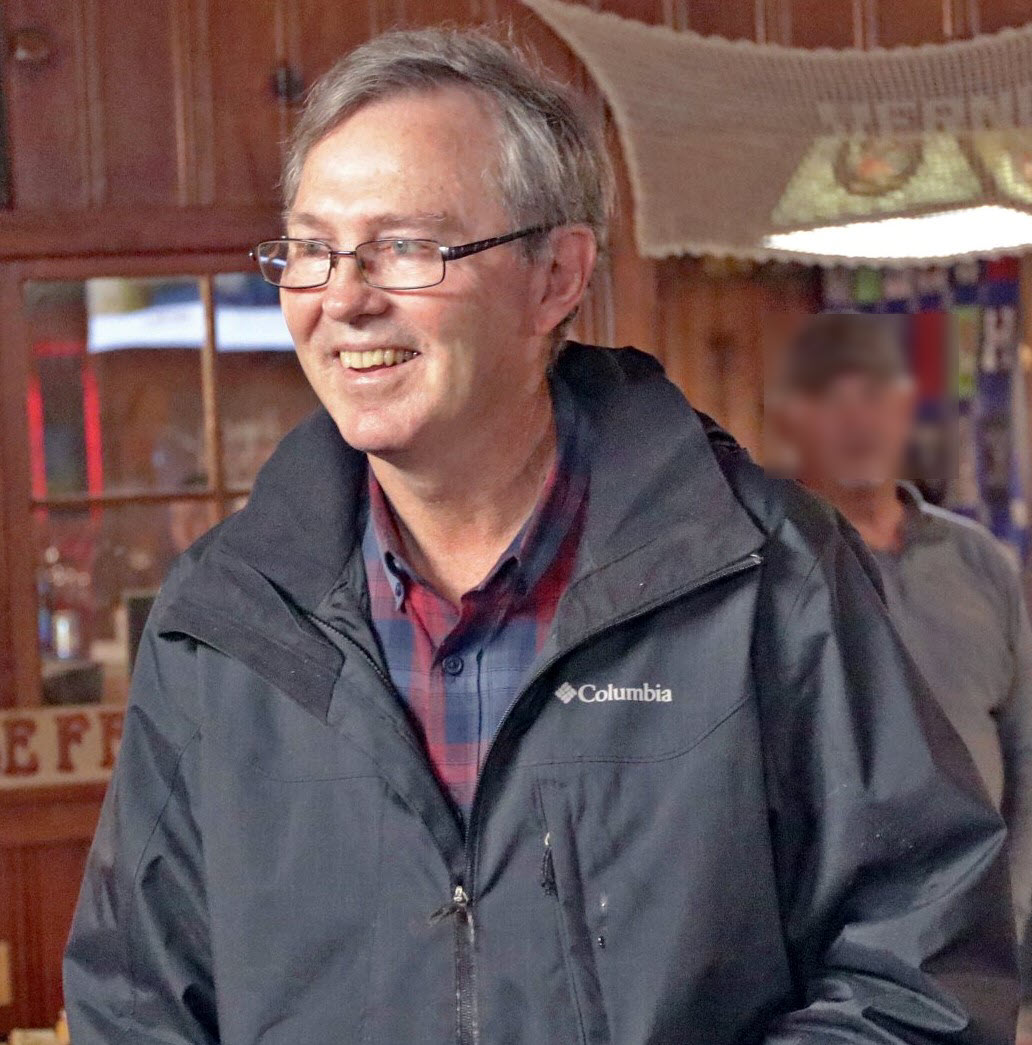
Leon Crosswhite, pictured here in 2019, was the Lions' second-round selection in the 1973 draft.

Detroit Lions' selections in the 1973 NFL draftSource: Pro Football Reference
Round	Pick #	Overall	Name	Position	College
1	17	17	Ernie Price	Defensive end	Texas A&M–Kingsville
2	18	44	Leon Crosswhite	Running back	Oklahoma
3	6	58	John Brady	Tight end	Washington
3	19	71	Jim Laslavic	Linebacker	Penn State
3	23	75	Levi Johnson	Defensive back	Texas A&M–Kingsville
4	3	81	Mike Hennigan	Linebacker	Tennessee Tech
4	13	91	Dick Jauron	Defensive back	Yale
4	18	96	Jim Hooks	Running back	Central Oklahoma
7	19	175	John Andrews	Defensive end	Morgan State
8	18	200	Prentice McCray	Defensive back	Arizona State
8	21	203	John Bledsoe	Running back	Ohio State
9	19	227	Ira Dean	Defensive back	Baylor
10	18	252	Ray Bonner	Defensive back	Middle Tennessee State
11	19	279	Scott Freeman	Wide receiver	Wyoming
12	18	304	Tom Scott	Wide receiver	Washington
13	19	331	John Moss	Linebacker	Pittsburgh
14	18	356	Jay Corey	Tackle	Santa Clara
15	19	383	Dan Hansen	Defensive back	BYU
16	18	408	Larry Nickels	Wide receiver	Dayton
17	19	435	Earl Belgrave	Tackle	Ohio State

== 1974 draft ==
Detroit Lions' selections in the 1974 NFL draftSource: Pro Football Reference
Round	Pick #	Overall	Name	Position	College
1	8	8	Ed O'Neil	Linebacker	Penn State
2	13	39	Billy Howard	Defensive end	Alcorn State
3	13	65	Dexter Bussey	Running back	Texas–Arlington
5	13	117	Carl Capria	Defensive back	Purdue
6	9	139	Willie Burden	Running back	NC State
6	13	143	Jim Davis	Guard	Alcorn State
7	13	169	Efrén Herrera	Kicker	UCLA
8	13	195	Mike Denimarck	Linebacker	Emporia State
10	13	247	David Wooley	Running back	Central Oklahoma
11	13	273	T. C. Blair	Tight end	Tulsa
12	13	299	Mark Wakefield	Wide receiver	Tampa
13	13	325	Fred Rothwell	Center	Kansas State
14	13	351	David Jones	Defensive back	Howard Payne
15	13	377	John Wells	Guard	Kansas State
16	13	403	Myron Wilson	Defensive back	Bowling Green
17	13	429	Collis Temple	Defensive end	LSU

== 1975 draft ==
Detroit Lions' selections in the 1975 NFL draftSource: Pro Football Reference
Round	Pick #	Overall	Name	Position	College
1	13	13	Lynn Boden	Guard	South Dakota State
2	12	38	Doug English	Defensive tackle	Texas
4	16	94	Craig Hertwig	Tackle	Georgia
6	8	138	Fred Cooper	Defensive back	Purdue
6	11	141	Horace King	Running back	Georgia
6	14	144	Dennis Franklin	Wide receiver	Michigan
7	13	169	Mike Murphy	Wide receiver	Drake
8	12	194	Leonard Thompson	Wide receiver	Oklahoma State
9	11	219	Steve Strinko	Linebacker	Michigan
10	16	250	Brad Boyd	Tight end	LSU
11	15	275	Steve Myers	Guard	Ohio State
12	14	300	Andre Roundtree	Linebacker	Iowa State
13	13	325	Jim Smith	Running back	North Carolina Central
14	12	350	Jim McMillan	Quarterback	Boise State.
15	11	375	Rudy Green	Running back	Yale
16	16	406	Les Chaves	Defensive back	Kansas State
17	15	431	Mack Lancaster	Defensive tackle	Tulsa

== 1976 draft ==
Detroit Lions' selections in the 1976 NFL draftSource: Pro Football Reference
Round	Pick #	Overall	Name	Position	College
1	10	10	James Hunter	Defensive back	Grambling State
1	16	16	Lawrence Gaines	Running back	Wyoming
2	16	44	Ken Long	Guard	Purdue
2	18	46	David Hill	Tight end	Texas A&M–Kingsville
3	8	68	Russ Bolinger	Guard	Long Beach State
3	16	76	John Woodcock	Defensive tackle	Hawaii
5	21	145	Steadman Scavella	Linebacker	Miami (FL)
7	16	198	Garth TenNapel	Linebacker	Texas A&M
8	8	217	Rich Sorenson	Kicker	Cal State-Chico
8	16	225	Charles Braswell	Defensive back	West Virginia
9	16	253	Leanell Jones	Tight end	Long Beach State
10	14	279	Bill Bowerman	Quarterback	New Mexico State
11	16	307	Gary Shugrue	Defensive end	Villanova
12	16	335	Mike McCabe	Center	South Carolina
13	16	363	Mel Jacobs	Wide receiver	San Diego State
14	16	391	Leonard Elston	Wide receiver	Kentucky State
15	16	419	Trent Smock	Wide receiver	Indiana
16	16	447	Craig McCurdy	Linebacker	William & Mary
17	16	475	Jim Meeks	Defensive back	Boise State.

== 1977 draft ==
Detroit Lions' selections in the 1977 NFL draftSource: Pro Football Reference
Round	Pick #	Overall	Name	Position	College
2	14	42	Walt Williams	Defensive back	New Mexico State
3	13	69	Rick Kane	Running back	San Jose State
4	12	96	Luther Blue	Wide receiver	Iowa State
5	2	114	Ron Crosby	Linebacker	Penn State
6	27	166	Reggie Pinkney	Defensive back	East Carolina
7	12	179	Tim Black	Linebacker	Baylor
8	14	209	Mark Griffin	Tackle	North Carolina
9	13	236	Steve Mathieson	Quarterback	Florida State
10	12	263	Gary Anderson	Guard	Stanford
11	14	293	Tony Daykin	Linebacker	Georgia Tech
12	13	320	Dave Greenwood	Guard	Iowa State

== 1978 draft ==
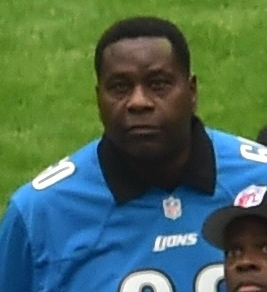
Al Baker, pictured here in 2014, was the Lions' second-round selection in the 1978 draft.

Detroit Lions' selections in the 1978 NFL draftSource: Pro Football Reference
Round	Pick #	Overall	Name	Position	College
1	11	11	Luther Bradley	Defensive back	Notre Dame
2	12	40	Al Baker	Defensive end	Colorado State
4	10	94	Bill Fifer	Tackle	West Texas A&M
4	23	107	Homer Elias	Guard	Tennessee State
4	25	109	Larry Tearry	Center	Wake Forest
5	11	121	Amos Fowler	Center	Southern Miss
5	13	123	Dan Gray	Defensive tackle	Rutgers
6	12	150	Dwight Hicks	Defensive back	Michigan
6	15	153	Tony Ardizzone	Center	Northwestern
6	27	165	Jesse Thompson	Wide receiver	California
7	11	177	Bruce Gibson	Running back	Pacific
8	12	206	Jim Breech	Kicker	California
10	12	262	Fred Arrington	Linebacker	Purdue
11	11	289	Richard Murray	Defensive tackle	Oklahoma
12	12	318	Mark Patterson	Defensive back	Washington State

== 1979 draft ==
Detroit Lions' selections in the 1979 NFL draftSource: Pro Football Reference
Round	Pick #	Overall	Name	Position	College
1	10	10	Keith Dorney	Tackle	Penn State
2	9	37	Ken Fantetti	Linebacker	Wyoming
3	11	67	Bo Robinson	Running back	West Texas A&M
4	6	88	Ulysses Norris	Tight end	Georgia
4	10	92	Jon Brooks	Linebacker	Clemson
5	21	131	Walt Brown	Center	Pittsburgh
8	21	213	John Mohring	Linebacker	C.W. Post
9	11	231	Jeff Komlo	Quarterback	Delaware
11	27	302	Eddie Cole	Linebacker	Mississippi
12	10	313	Bob Forster	Center	Brown
12	23	326	Bryan Sweeney	Wide receiver	Texas A&M–Kingsville

== 1980 draft ==
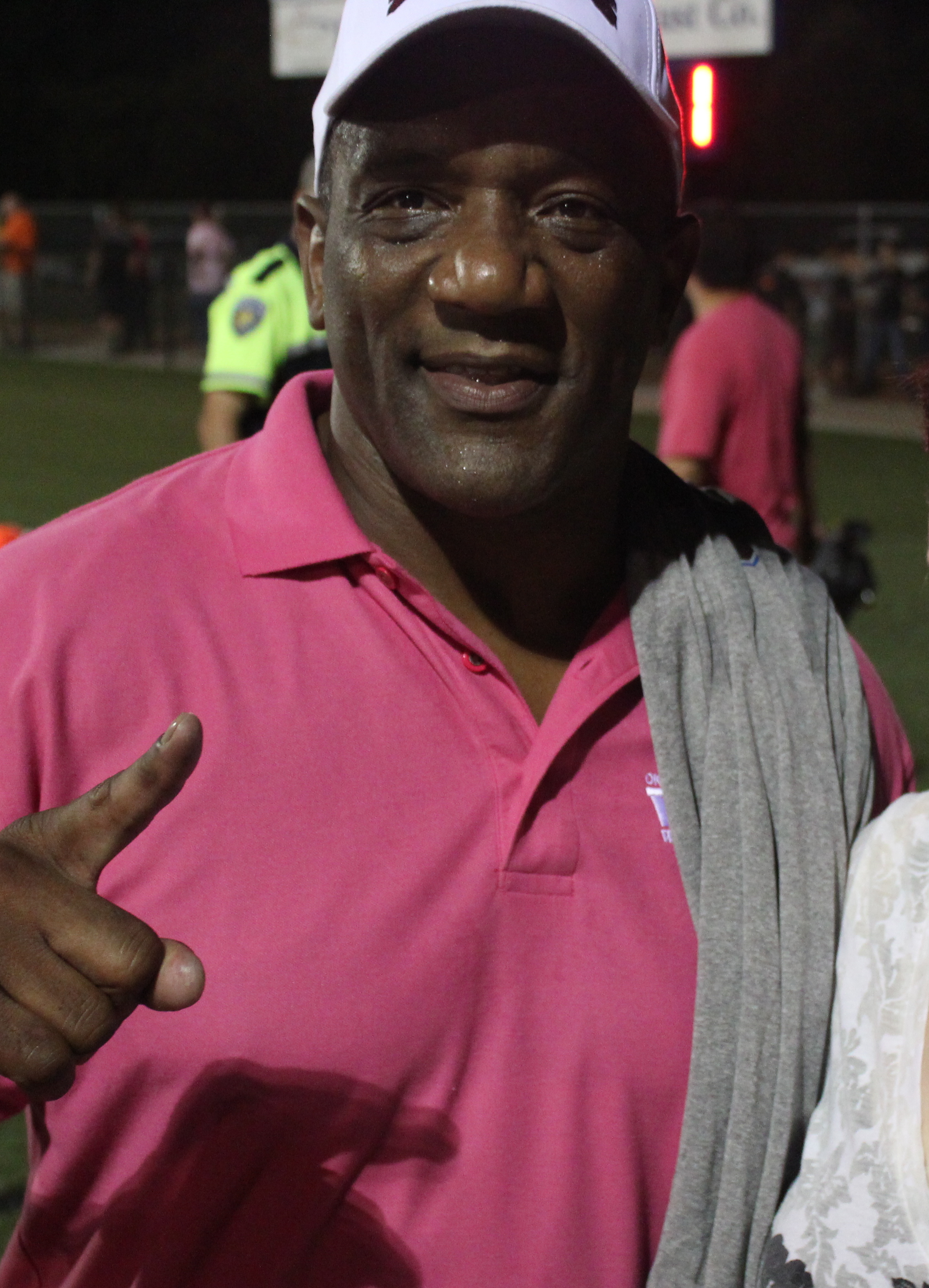
Billy Sims, pictured here in 2010, was selected first overall by the Lions in the 1980 draft.

Detroit Lions' selections in the 1980 NFL draftSource: Pro Football Reference
Round	Pick #	Overall	Name	Position	College
1	1	1	Billy Sims	Running back	Oklahoma
3	1	57	Tom Turnure	Center	Washington
3	6	62	Mike Friede	Wide receiver	Indiana
4	2	85	Eric Hipple	Quarterback	Utah State
5	1	111	Mark Streeter	Defensive back	Arizona
5	10	120	Tommie Ginn	Center	Arkansas
6	2	140	Chris Dieterich	Tackle	NC State
7	1	166	Eddie Murray	Kicker	Tulane
9	1	222	DeWayne Jett	Wide receiver	Hawaii
9	2	223	Tom Tuinei	Defensive tackle	Hawaii
10	2	251	Donnie Henderson	Defensive back	Utah State
11	1	278	Wayne Smith	Defensive back	Purdue
12	2	307	Ray Williams	Running back	Washington State

== 1981 draft ==
Detroit Lions' selections in the 1981 NFL draftSource: Pro Football Reference
Round	Pick #	Overall	Name	Position	College
1	16	16	Mark Nichols	Wide receiver	San Jose State
2	18	46	Curtis Green	Defensive end	Alabama State
3	16	72	Don Greco	Guard	Western Illinois
4	16	99	Tracy Porter	Wide receiver	LSU
5	18	129	Larry Lee	Guard	UCLA
6	17	155	Sam Johnson	Defensive back	Maryland
7	16	182	Lee Spivey	Tackle	SMU
8	18	211	Bob Niziolek	Tight end	Colorado
9	17	238	Hugh Jernigan	Defensive back	Arkansas
9	19	240	David Martin	Defensive back	Villanova
10	16	264	Andy Cannavino	Linebacker	Michigan
11	18	294	Willie Jackson	Defensive back	Mississippi State

== 1982 draft ==
=== Supplemental draft pick ===
Detroit Lions' selections in the 1982 supplemental draft
Round	Pick #	Overall	Name	Position	College
9	—	—	Kevin Robinson	Defensive back	North Carolina A&T

=== Annual draft picks ===
Detroit Lions' selections in the 1982 NFL draftSource: Pro Football Reference
Round	Pick #	Overall	Name	Position	College
1	15	15	Jimmy Williams	Linebacker	Nebraska
2	15	42	Bobby Watkins	Defensive back	Texas State
3	14	69	Steve Doig	Linebacker	New Hampshire
4	13	96	Bruce McNorton	Defensive back	Georgetown (KY)
5	16	127	William Graham	Defensive back	Texas
6	15	154	Mike Machurek	Quarterback	Idaho State
7	8	175	Phil Bates	Running back	Nebraska
7	20	187	Victor Simmons	Wide receiver	Oregon State
8	13	208	Martin Moss	Defensive end	UCLA
9	8	231	Dan Wagoner	Defensive back	Kansas
10	15	266	Roosevelt Barnes	Linebacker	Purdue
11	13	292	Edward Lee	Wide receiver	South Carolina State
12	13	319	Ricky Porter	Running back	Slippery Rock
12	20	326	Rob Rubick	Tight end	Grand Valley State

== 1983 draft ==
Detroit Lions' selections in the 1983 NFL draftSource: Pro Football Reference
Round	Pick #	Overall	Name	Position	College
1	13	13	James Jones	Fullback	Florida
2	12	40	Rich Strenger	Tackle	Michigan
3	11	67	Mike Cofer	Linebacker	Tennessee
4	10	94	August Curley	Linebacker	USC
5	3	115	Demetrious Johnson	Defensive back	Missouri
5	9	121	Steve Mott	Center	Alabama
6	14	154	Todd Brown	Wide receiver	Nebraska
7	13	181	Mike Black	Punter	Arizona State
8	12	208	Bill Stapleton	Defensive back	Washington
9	Forfeited due to the selection of Kevin Robinson in the 1982 supplemental draft.				
10	10	261	Dave Laube	Guard	Penn State
11	8	287	Ben Tate	Running back	North Carolina Central
12	14	321	Jim Lane	Center	Idaho State

== 1984 draft ==
Detroit Lions' selections in the 1984 NFL draftSource: Pro Football Reference
Round	Pick #	Overall	Name	Position	College
1	20	20	David Lewis	Tight end	California
2	19	47	Pete Mandley	Wide receiver	Northern Arizona
3	6	62	Eric Williams	Defensive end	Washington State
3	18	74	Ernest Anderson	Running back	Oklahoma State
3	19	75	Steve Baack	Nose tackle	Oregon
4	22	106	Dave D'Addio	Running back	Maryland
6	20	160	John Witkowski	Quarterback	Columbia
7	10	178	Jimmie Carter	Linebacker	New Mexico
7	19	187	Renwick Atkins	Tackle	Kansas
8	18	214	David Jones	Guard	Texas
9	22	246	Rich Hollins	Wide receiver	West Virginia
10	7	259	William Frizzell	Defensive back	North Carolina Central
10	21	273	James Thaxton	Defensive back	Louisiana Tech
11	20	300	Mike Saxon	Punter	San Diego State
12	19	327	Glenn Streno	Center	Tennessee

== 1984 NFL supplemental draft ==
Detroit Lions' draft selections in the 1984 NFL supplemental draft of USFL and CFL playersSource: Pro Football Reference, Pro Football Hall of Fame
Round	Pick #	Overall	Name	Position	Pro team
1	20	20	Al Williams	Wide receiver	Oklahoma Outlaws
2	19	47	George Jamison	Linebacker	Philadelphia Stars
3	18	74	Doug Hollie	Defensive end	Pittsburgh Maulers

== 1985 draft ==
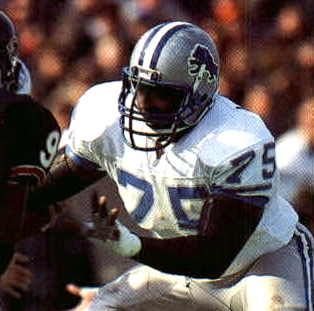
Lomas Brown was the Lions' first-round selection in the 1985 draft.

Detroit Lions' selections in the 1985 NFL draftSource: Pro Football Reference
Round	Pick #	Overall	Name	Position	College
1	6	6	Lomas Brown	Tackle	Florida
2	6	34	Kevin Glover	Center	Maryland
3	6	62	James Johnson	Linebacker	San Diego State
4	6	90	Kevin Hancock	Linebacker	Baylor
5	6	118	Joe McIntosh	Running back	NC State
6	6	146	Stan Short	Guard	Penn State
7	6	174	Tony Staten	Defensive back	Angelo State
8	6	202	Scott Caldwell	Running back	Texas–Arlington
9	6	230	June James	Linebacker	Texas
10	6	258	Clayton Beauford	Wide receiver	Auburn
11	6	286	Kevin Harris	Defensive back	Georgia
12	6	314	Mike Weaver	Guard	Georgia

== 1986 draft ==
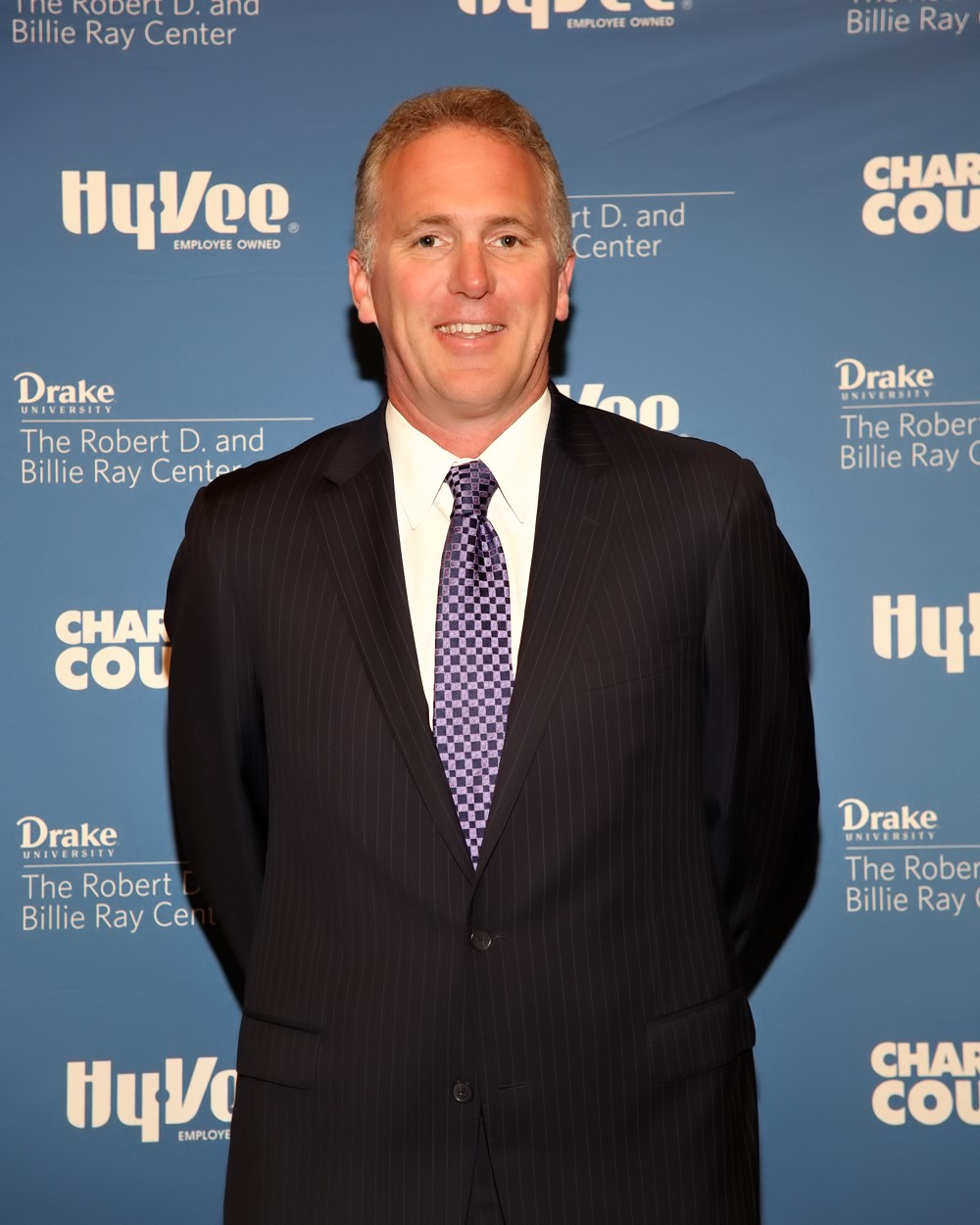
Chuck Long, pictured here in 2015, was the Lions' first-round selection in the 1986 draft.

Detroit Lions' selections in the 1986 NFL draftSource: Pro Football Reference
Round	Pick #	Overall	Name	Position	College
1	12	12	Chuck Long	Quarterback	Iowa
2	2	29	Garry James	Running back	LSU
3	14	69	Joe Milinichik	Guard	NC State
4	10	92	Devon Mitchell	Defensive back	Iowa
5	9	119	Oscar Smith	Running back	Nicholls State
8	11	205	Allyn Griffin	Wide receiver	Wyoming
9	10	231	Lyle Pickens	Defensive back	Colorado
10	9	258	Tracy Johnson	Linebacker	Morningside
11	13	290	Leland Melvin	Wide receiver	Richmond
12	12	317	Allan Durden	Defensive back	Arizona

== 1987 draft ==
Detroit Lions' selections in the 1987 NFL draftSource: Pro Football Reference
Round	Pick #	Overall	Name	Position	College
1	7	7	Reggie Rogers	Defensive end	Washington
3	7	63	Jerry Ball	Nose tackle	SMU
4	8	92	Garland Rivers	Defensive back	Michigan
6	8	148	Danny Lockett	Linebacker	Arizona
7	7	175	Dan Saleaumua	Defensive tackle	Arizona State
8	8	203	Dennis Gibson	Linebacker	Iowa State
9	7	230	Rick Calhoun	Running back	Cal State Fullerton
10	8	259	Ray Brown	Wide receiver	South Carolina
11	7	286	Brian Siverling	Tight end	Penn State
12	8	315	Gary Lee	Wide receiver	Georgia Tech

== 1988 draft ==
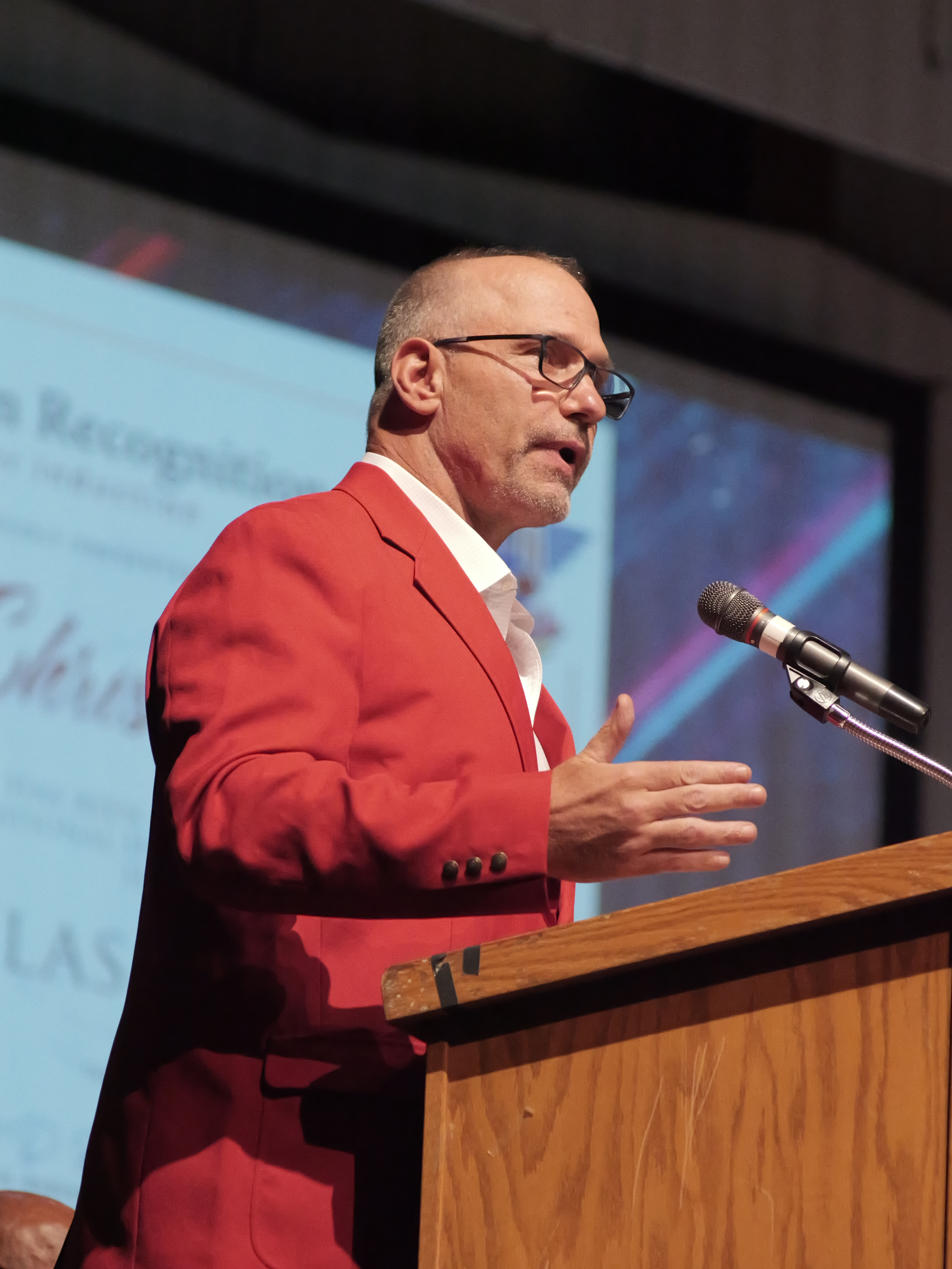
Chris Spielman, pictured here in 2023, was one of the Lions' second-round selections in the 1988 draft.

Detroit Lions' selections in the 1988 NFL draftSource: Pro Football Reference
Round	Pick #	Overall	Name	Position	College
1	3	3	Bennie Blades	Defensive back	Miami (FL)
2	2	29	Chris Spielman	Linebacker	Ohio State
2	5	32	Pat Carter	Tight end	Florida State
3	3	58	Ray Roundtree	Wide receiver	Penn State
4	3	85	William White	Defensive back	Ohio State
5	2	111	Eric Andolsek	Guard	LSU
6	5	142	Carl Painter	Running back	Hampton
7	4	169	Jeff James	Wide receiver	Stanford
8	3	196	Gary Hadd	Defensive tackle	Minnesota
9	2	223	Kip Corrington	Defensive back	Texas A&M
9	13	234	Todd Irvin	Tackle	Mississippi
10	5	254	Paco Craig	Wide receiver	UCLA
11	4	281	Danny McCoin	Quarterback	Cincinnati

== 1989 draft ==
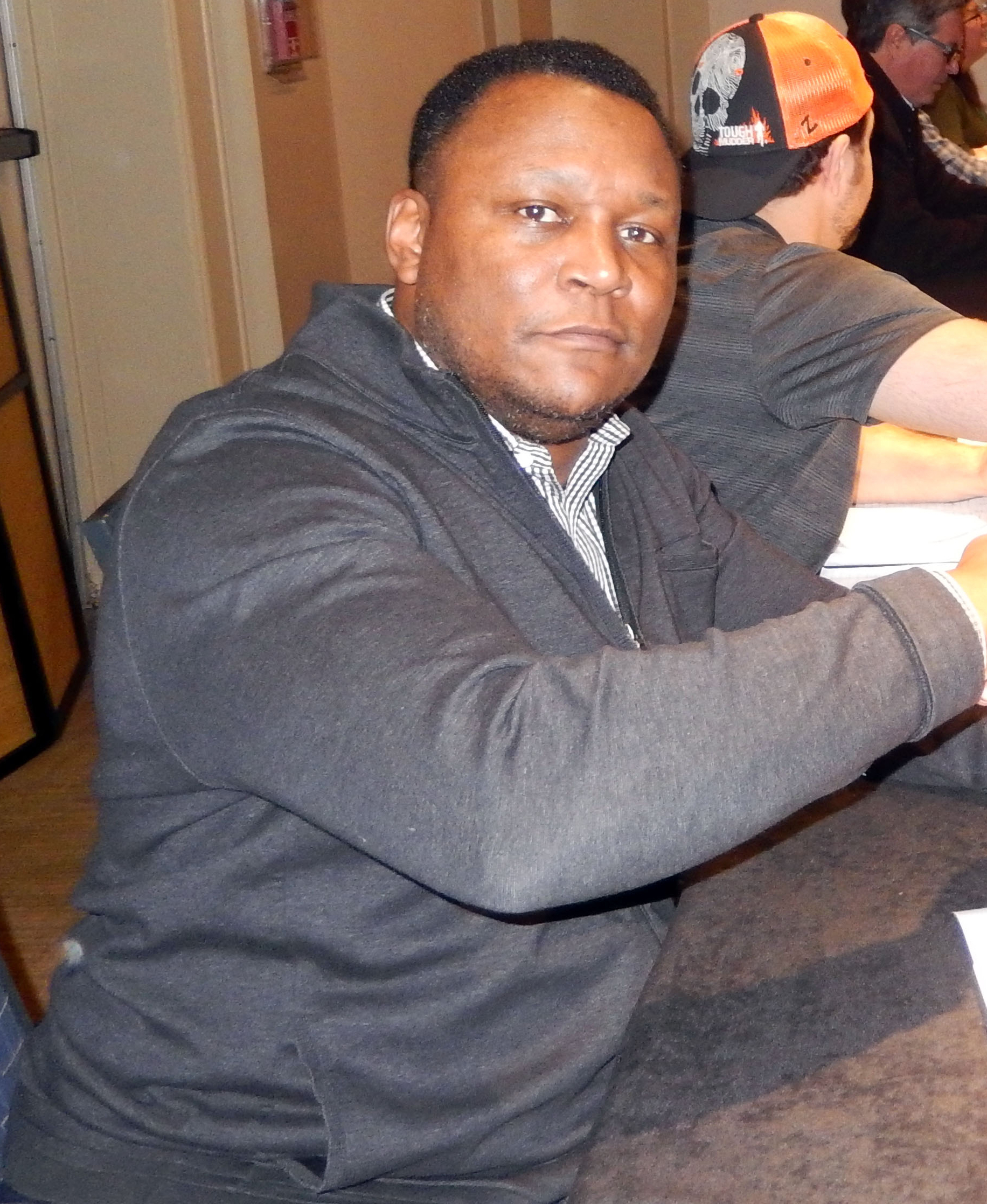
Hall of Fame running back Barry Sanders, pictured here in 2019, was the Lions' first-round selection in the 1989 draft.

Detroit Lions' selections in the 1989 NFL draftSource: Pro Football Reference
Round	Pick #	Overall	Name	Position	College
1	3	3	Barry Sanders †	Running back	Oklahoma State
2	2	30	John Ford	Wide receiver	Virginia
3	3	59	Mike Utley	Guard	Washington State
4	2	86	Ray Crockett	Defensive back	Baylor
5	3	115	Lawrence Pete	Nose tackle	Nebraska
6	2	141	Rodney Peete	Quarterback	USC
7	3	170	Jerry Woods	Defensive back	Northern Michigan
8	2	197	Chris Parker	Defensive tackle	West Virginia
9	3	226	Derek MacCready	Defensive end	Ohio State
10	2	253	Jason Phillips	Wide receiver	Houston
11	3	282	Keith Karpinski	Linebacker	Penn State
12	2	309	James Cribbs	Defensive end	Memphis

== 1990 draft ==
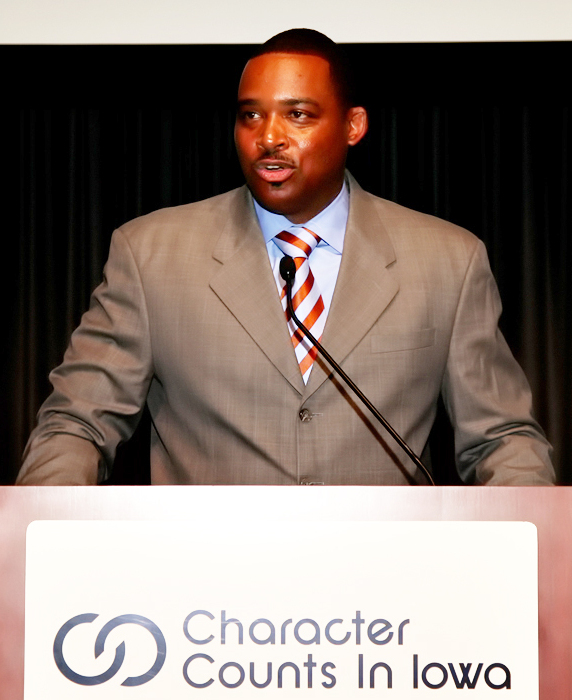
Andre Ware, pictured here in 2012, was the Lions' first-round selection in the 1990 draft.

Detroit Lions' selections in the 1990 NFL draftSource: Pro Football Reference
Round	Pick #	Overall	Name	Position	College
1	7	7	Andre Ware	Quarterback	Houston
2	10	35	Dan Owens	Defensive end	USC
3	9	62	Marc Spindler	Defensive end	Pittsburgh
4	9	90	Rob Hinckley	Linebacker	Stanford
4	24	105	Chris Oldham	Defensive back	Oregon
5	9	118	Jeff Campbell	Wide receiver	Colorado
6	10	147	Maurice Henry	Linebacker	Kansas State
7	9	174	Tracy Hayworth	Linebacker	Tennessee
8	1	194	Willie Green	Wide receiver	Mississippi
8	10	203	Roman Fortin	Center	San Diego State
9	9	229	Jack Linn	Tackle	West Virginia
10	10	258	Bill Miller	Wide receiver	Illinois State
11	9	285	Reginald Warnsley	Running back	Southern Miss
12	9	313	Robert Claiborne	Wide receiver	San Diego State

== 1991 draft ==
Detroit Lions' selections in the 1991 NFL draftSource: Pro Football Reference
Round	Pick #	Overall	Name	Position	College
1	10	10	Herman Moore	Wide receiver	Virginia
3	3	58	Reggie Barrett	Wide receiver	Texas-El Paso
4	8	91	Kevin Scott	Defensive back	Stanford
5	7	118	Scott Conover	Tackle	Purdue
6	12	151	Richie Andrews	Kicker	Florida State
7	11	178	Franklin Thomas	Tight end	Grambling State
8	10	205	Cedric Jackson	Running back	TCU
9	8	231	Darryl Milburn	Defensive end	Grambling State
11	7	285	Slip Watkins	Kick returner	LSU
12	12	318	Zeno Alexander	Linebacker	Arizona

== 1992 draft ==
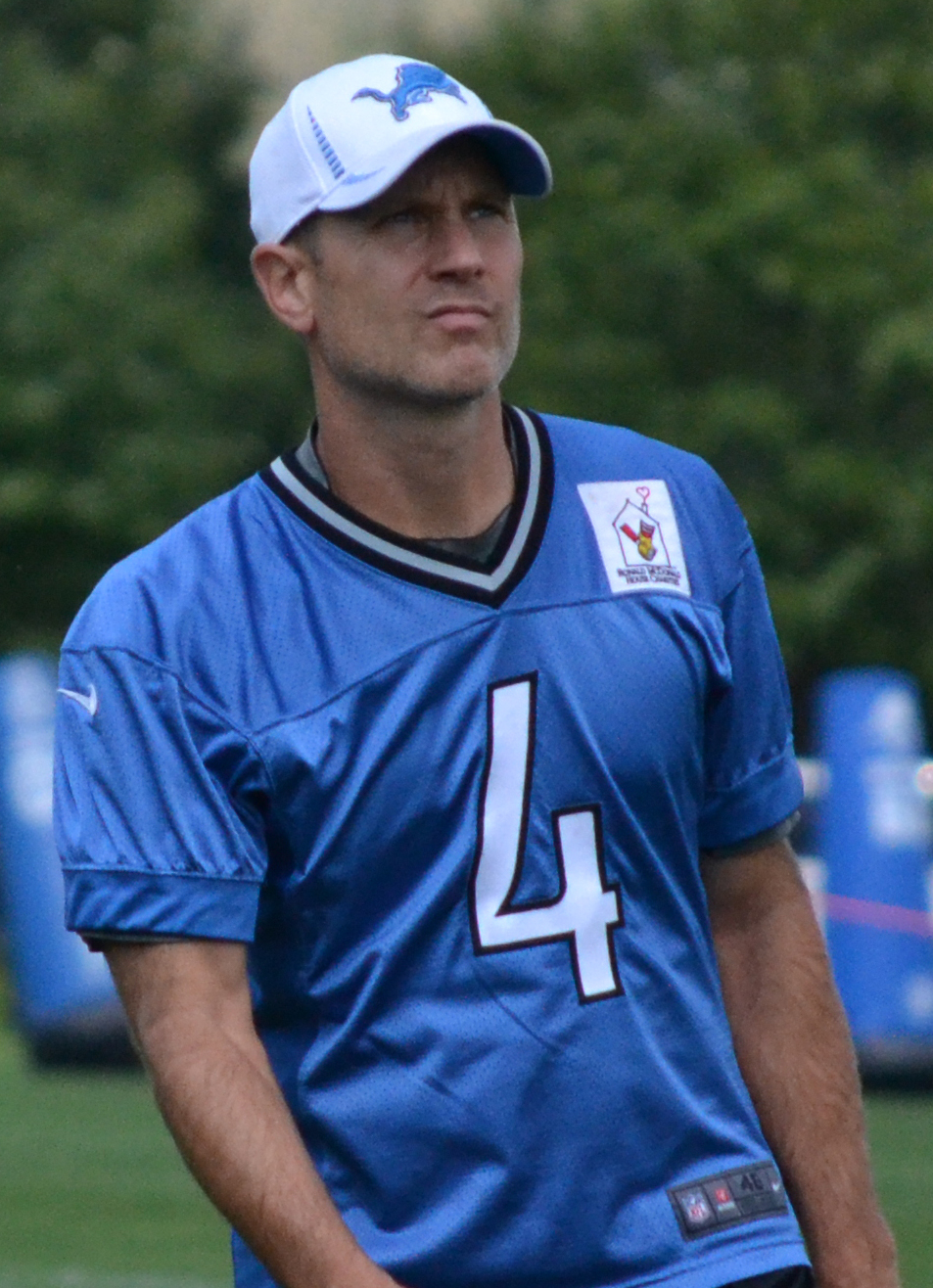
Jason Hanson was one of the Lions' second-round selections in the 1992 draft.

Detroit Lions' selections in the 1992 NFL draftSource: Pro Football Reference
Round	Pick #	Overall	Name	Position	College
1	26	26	Robert Porcher	Defensive end	South Carolina State
2	25	53	Tracy Scroggins	Defensive end	Tulsa
2	28	56	Jason Hanson	Kicker	Washington State
3	25	81	Thomas McLemore	Tight end	Southern
6	5	145	Larry Tharpe	Tackle	Tennessee State
8	25	221	Willie Clay	Defensive back	Georgia Tech
11	26	306	Ed Tillison	Fullback	Northwest Missouri State

== 1993 draft ==
Detroit Lions' selections in the 1993 NFL draftSource: Pro Football Reference
Round	Pick #	Overall	Name	Position	College
2	4	33	Ryan McNeil	Defensive back	Miami (FL)
3	6	62	Antonio London	Linebacker	Alabama
3	12	68	Mike Compton	Guard	West Virginia
6	7	147	Greg Jeffries	Defensive back	Virginia
7	6	174	Ty Hallock	Running back	Michigan State
8	5	201	Kevin Miniefield	Defensive back	Arizona State

== 1994 draft ==
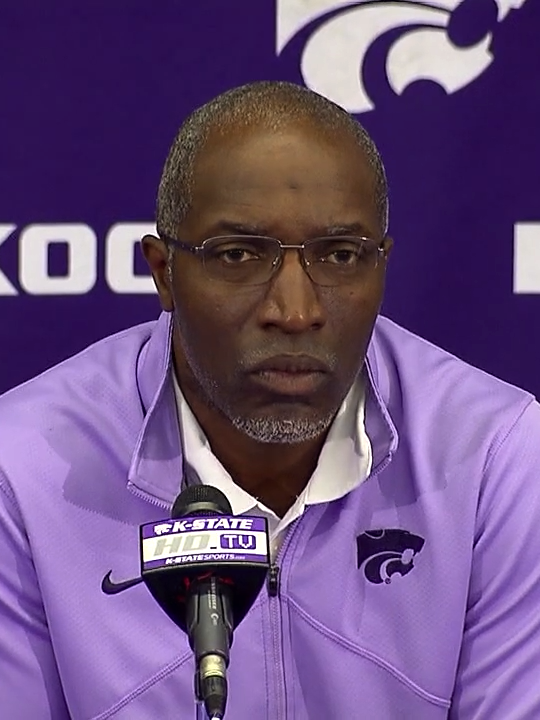
Van Malone, pictured here in 2022, was the Lions' second-round selection in the 1994 draft.

Detroit Lions' selections in the 1994 NFL draftSource: Pro Football Reference
Round	Pick #	Overall	Name	Position	College
1	21	21	Johnnie Morton	Wide receiver	USC
2	28	57	Van Malone	Defensive back	Texas
3	28	93	Shane Bonham	Defensive tackle	Tennessee
4	21	124	Vaughn Bryant	Defensive back	Stanford
5	23	154	Tony Semple	Guard	Memphis
6	22	183	Jocelyn Borgella	Defensive back	Cincinnati
7	21	215	Tom Beer	Linebacker	Saginaw Valley State

== 1995 draft ==
Detroit Lions' selections in the 1995 NFL draftSource: Pro Football Reference
Round	Pick #	Overall	Name	Position	College
1	20	20	Luther Elliss	Defensive tackle	Utah
3	6	70	David Sloan	Tight end	New Mexico
5	7	141	Stephen Boyd	Linebacker	Boston College
5	22	156	Kez McCorvey	Wide receiver	Florida State
5	29	163	Ronald Cherry	Tackle	McNeese State
6	15	186	Kevin Hickman	Tight end	Navy
6	21	192	Cory Schlesinger	Fullback	Nebraska
7	20	228	Hessley Hempstead	Guard	Kansas

== 1996 draft ==
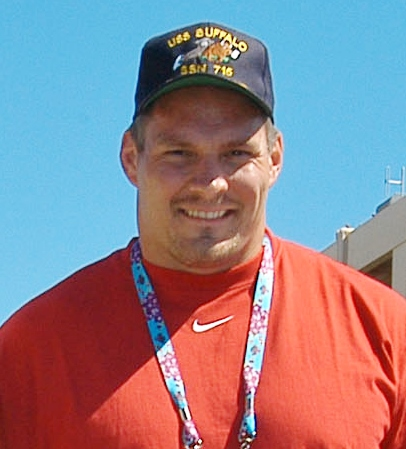
Jeff Hartings was one of the Lions' first-round selections in the 1996 draft.

Detroit Lions' selections in the 1996 NFL draftSource: Pro Football Reference
Round	Pick #	Overall	Name	Position	College
1	17	17	Reggie Brown	Linebacker	Texas A&M
1	23	23	Jeff Hartings	Center	Penn State
3	15	76	Ryan Stewart	Defensive back	Georgia Tech
4	34	129	Brad Ford	Defensive back	Alabama
5	26	158	Kerwin Waldroup	Defensive end	Central State

== 1997 draft ==
Detroit Lions' selections in the 1997 NFL draftSource: Pro Football Reference
Round	Pick #	Overall	Name	Position	College
1	5	5	Bryant Westbrook	Defensive back	Texas
2	5	35	Juan Roque	Tackle	Arizona State
2	24	54	Kevin Abrams	Defensive back	Syracuse
4	34	130	Matt Russell	Linebacker	Colorado
5	5	135	Pete Chryplewicz	Tight end	Notre Dame
5	31	161	Duane Ashman	Defensive end	Virginia
6	5	168	Tony Ramirez	Tackle	Northern Colorado
7	5	206	Terry Battle	Running back	Arizona State
7	31	232	Marcus Harris	Wide receiver	Wyoming
7	38	239	Richard Jordan	Linebacker	Missouri Southern

== 1998 draft ==
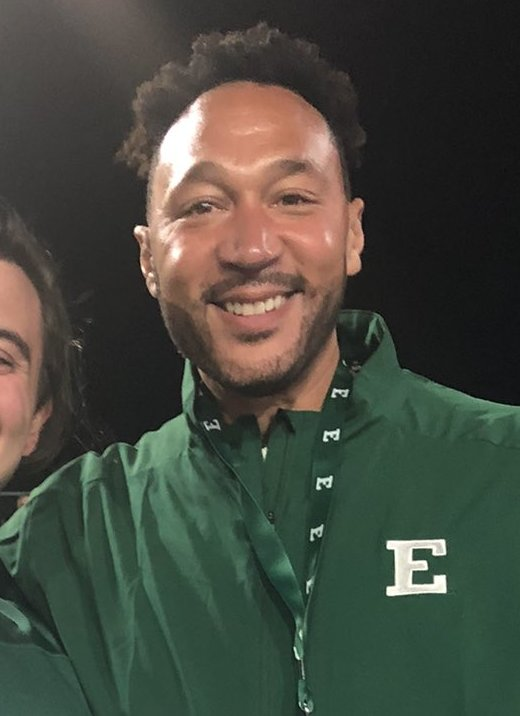
Charlie Batch, pictured here in 2021, was one of the Lions' second-round selections in the 1998 draft.

Detroit Lions' selections in the 1998 NFL draftSource: Pro Football Reference
Round	Pick #	Overall	Name	Position	College
1	20	20	Terry Fair	Defensive back	Tennessee
2	20	50	Germane Crowell	Wide receiver	Virginia
2	30	60	Charlie Batch	Quarterback	Eastern Michigan
6	32	185	Jamaal Alexander	Defensive back	Southern Miss
7	18	207	Chris Liwienski	Guard	Indiana

== 1999 draft ==
Detroit Lions' selections in the 1999 NFL draftSource: Pro Football Reference
Round	Pick #	Overall	Name	Position	College
1	9	9	Chris Claiborne	Linebacker	USC
1	27	27	Aaron Gibson	Tackle	Wisconsin
3	9	70	Jared DeVries	Defensive end	Iowa
4	8	103	Sedrick Irvin	Running back	Michigan State
5	4	137	Tyree Talton	Defensive back	Northern Iowa
6	8	177	Clint Kriewaldt	Linebacker	Wisconsin–Stevens Point
7	9	215	Mike Pringley	Defensive end	North Carolina

== 2000 draft ==
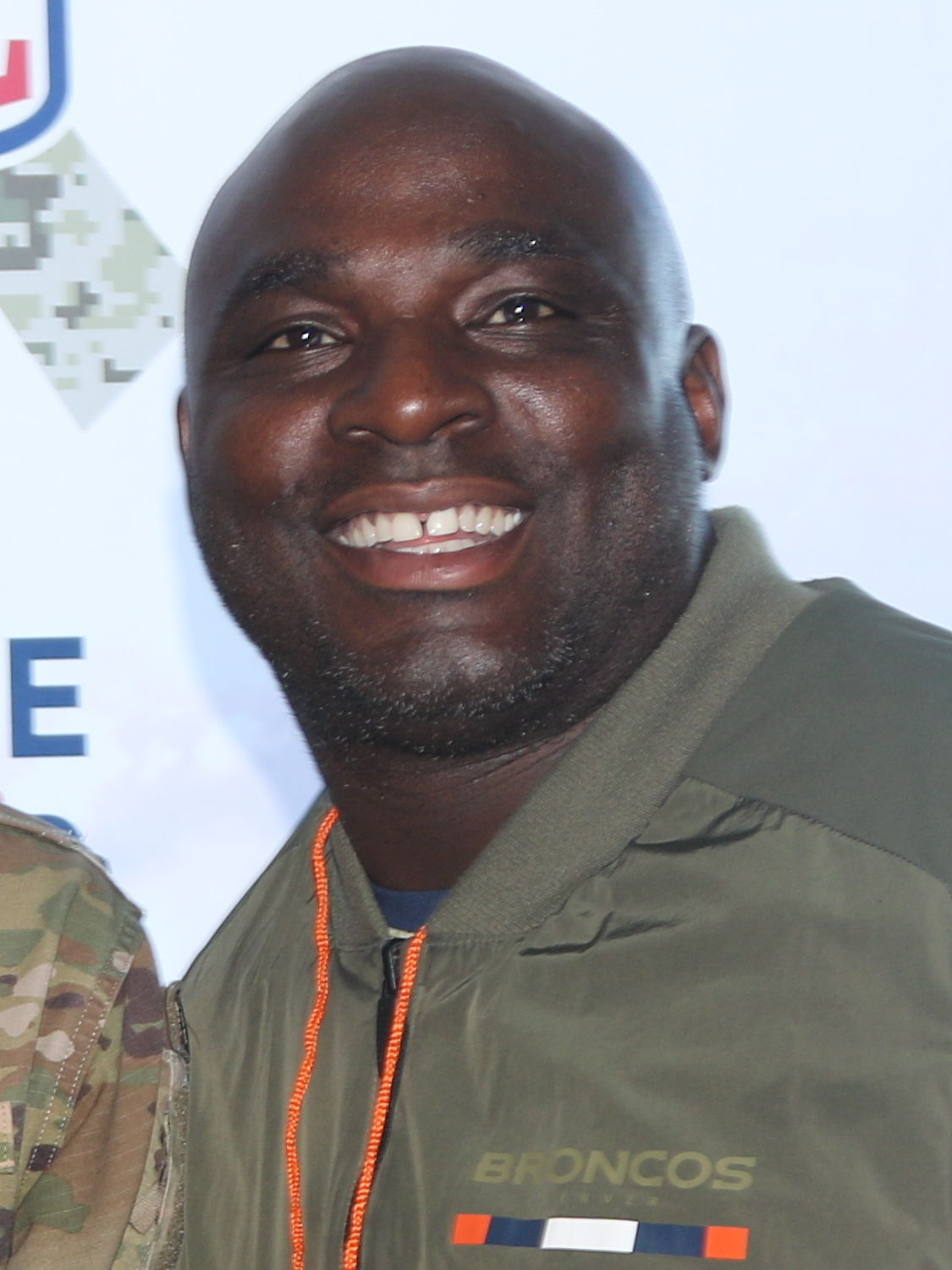
Reuben Droughns, pictured here in 2021, was the Lions' third-round selection in the 2000 draft.

Detroit Lions' selections in the 2000 NFL draftSource: Pro Football Reference
Round	Pick #	Overall	Name	Position	College
1	20	20	Stockar McDougle	Tackle	Oklahoma
2	19	50	Barrett Green	Linebacker	West Virginia
3	19	81	Reuben Droughns	Running back	Oregon
5	16	145	Todd Franz	Defensive back	Tulsa
6	15	181	Quinton Reese	Defensive end	Auburn
7	47	253	Alfonso Boone	Defensive tackle	Mt. San Antonio

== 2001 draft ==
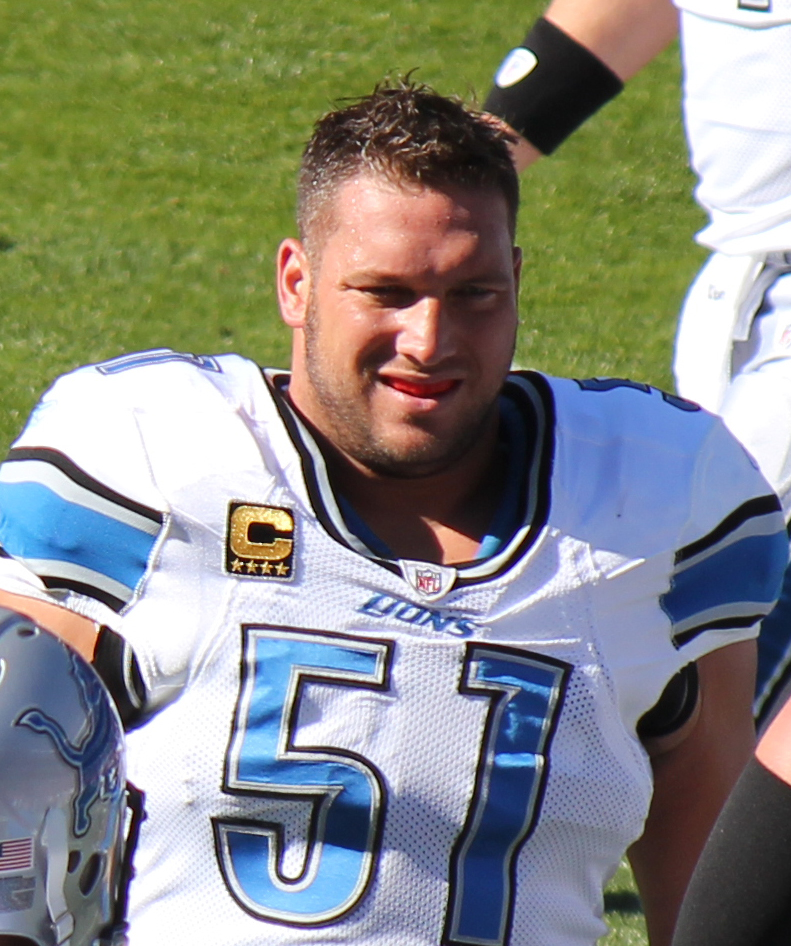
Dominic Raiola was one of the Lions' second-round selections in the 2001 draft.

Detroit Lions' selections in the 2001 NFL draftSource: Pro Football Reference
Round	Pick #	Overall	Name	Position	College
1	18	18	Jeff Backus	Tackle	Michigan
2	19	50	Dominic Raiola	Center	Nebraska
2	30	61	Shaun Rogers	Defensive tackle	Texas
5	17	148	Scotty Anderson	Wide receiver	Grambling State
5	18	149	Mike McMahon	Quarterback	Rutgers
6	10	173	Jason Glenn	Linebacker	Texas A&M

== 2002 draft ==
Detroit Lions' selections in the 2002 NFL draftSource: Pro Football Reference
Round	Pick #	Overall	Name	Position	College
1	3	3	Joey Harrington	Quarterback	Oregon
2	3	35	Kalimba Edwards	Defensive end	South Carolina
3	3	68	André Goodman	Defensive back	South Carolina
4	36	134	Johnathan Taylor	Linebacker	Montana State
5	3	138	John Owens	Tight end	Notre Dame
6	3	175	Chris Cash	Defensive back	USC
7	3	214	Luke Staley	Running back	BYU
7	42	252	Matt Murphy	Tight end	Maryland
7	48	259	Victor Rogers	Tackle	Colorado

== 2003 draft ==
Detroit Lions' selections in the 2003 NFL draftSource: Pro Football Reference
Round	Pick #	Overall	Name	Position	College
1	2	2	Charles Rogers	Wide receiver	Michigan State
2	2	34	Boss Bailey	Linebacker	Georgia
3	2	66	Cory Redding	Defensive end	Texas
4	2	99	Artose Pinner	Running back	Kentucky
5	2	137	Terrence Holt	Defensive back	NC State
5	9	144	James Davis	Linebacker	West Virginia
6	2	175	David Kircus	Wide receiver	Grand Valley State
7	2	216	Ben Johnson	Tackle	Wisconsin
7	6	220	Blue Adams	Defensive back	Cincinnati
7	22	236	Brandon Drumm	Running back	Colorado
7	46	260	Travis Anglin	Wide receiver	Memphis

== 2004 draft ==
Detroit Lions' selections in the 2004 NFL draftSource: Pro Football Reference
Round	Pick #	Overall	Name	Position	College
1	7	7	Roy Williams	Wide receiver	Texas
1	30	30	Kevin Jones	Running back	Virginia Tech
2	5	37	Teddy Lehman	Linebacker	Oklahoma
3	10	73	Keith Smith	Defensive back	McNeese State
5	8	140	Alex Lewis	Linebacker	Wisconsin
6	7	172	Kelly Butler	Tackle	Purdue

== 2005 draft ==
Detroit Lions' selections in the 2005 NFL draftSource: Pro Football Reference
Round	Pick #	Overall	Name	Position	College
1	10	10	Mike Williams	Wide receiver	USC
2	5	37	Shaun Cody	Defensive tackle	USC
3	8	72	Stanley Wilson	Defensive back	Stanford
5	9	145	Dan Orlovsky	Quarterback	UConn
6	10	184	Bill Swancutt	Defensive end	Oregon State
6	32	206	Johnathan Goddard	Defensive end	Marshall

== 2006 draft ==
Detroit Lions' selections in the 2006 NFL draftSource: Pro Football Reference
Round	Pick #	Overall	Name	Position	College
1	9	9	Ernie Sims	Linebacker	Florida State
2	8	40	Daniel Bullocks	Defensive back	Nebraska
3	10	74	Brian Calhoun	Running back	Wisconsin
5	8	141	Jonathan Scott	Tackle	Texas
6	10	179	Dee McCann	Defensive back	West Virginia
7	9	217	Fred Matua	Guard	USC
7	39	247	Anthony Cannon	Linebacker	Tulane

== 2007 draft ==
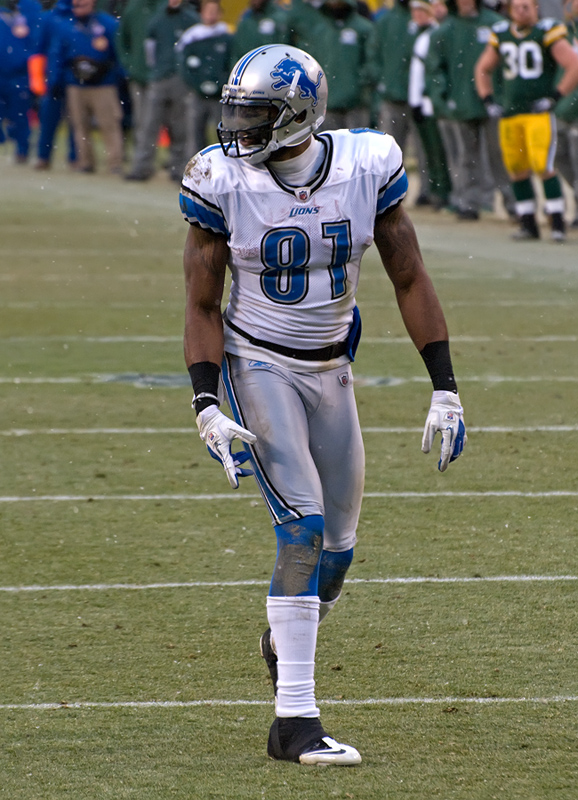
Hall of Fame wide receiver Calvin Johnson was drafted second overall in the 2007 draft.

Detroit Lions' selections in the 2007 NFL draftSource: Pro Football Reference
Round	Pick #	Overall	Name	Position	College
1	2	2	Calvin Johnson †	Wide receiver	Georgia Tech
2	11	43	Drew Stanton	Quarterback	Michigan State
2	26	58	Ikaika Alama-Francis	Defensive end	Hawaii
2	29	61	Gerald Alexander	Defensive back	Boise State.
4	6	105	A. J. Davis	Defensive back	NC State
4	18	117	Manny Ramirez	Guard	Texas Tech
5	21	158	Johnny Baldwin	Linebacker	Arkansas–Monticello
7	45	255	Ramzee Robinson	Defensive back	Alabama

== 2008 draft ==
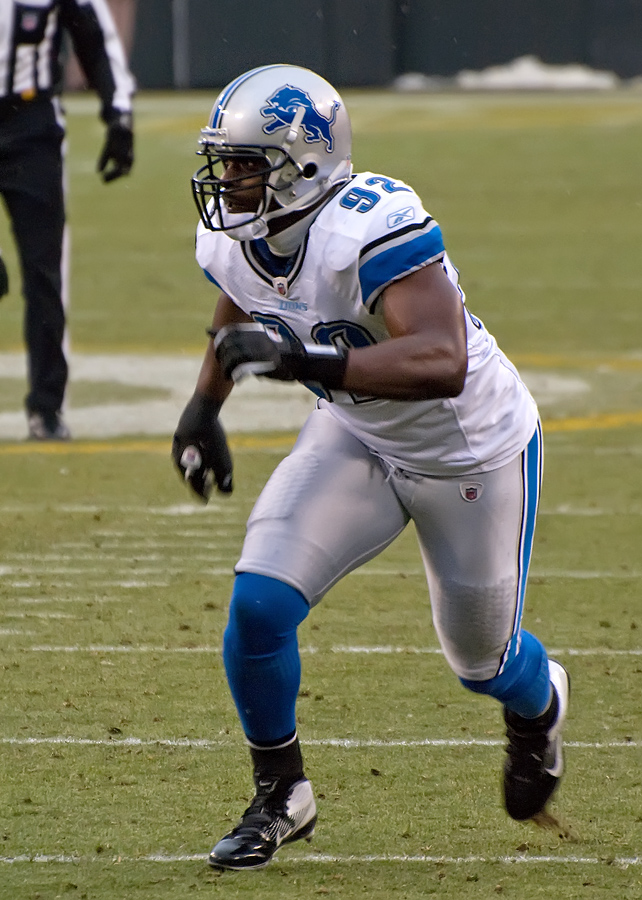
Cliff Avril was one of the Lions' third-round selections in the 2008 draft.

Detroit Lions' selections in the 2008 NFL draftSource: Pro Football Reference
Round	Pick #	Overall	Name	Position	College
1	17	17	Gosder Cherilus	Tackle	Boston College
2	14	45	Jordon Dizon	Linebacker	Colorado
3	1	64	Kevin Smith	Running back	UCF
3	24	87	Andre Fluellen	Defensive tackle	Florida State
3	29	92	Cliff Avril	Linebacker	Purdue
5	1	136	Kenneth Moore	Wide receiver	Wake Forest
5	11	146	Jerome Felton	Fullback	Furman
7	9	216	Landon Cohen	Defensive tackle	Ohio
7	11	218	Caleb Campbell	Defensive back	Army

== 2009 draft ==
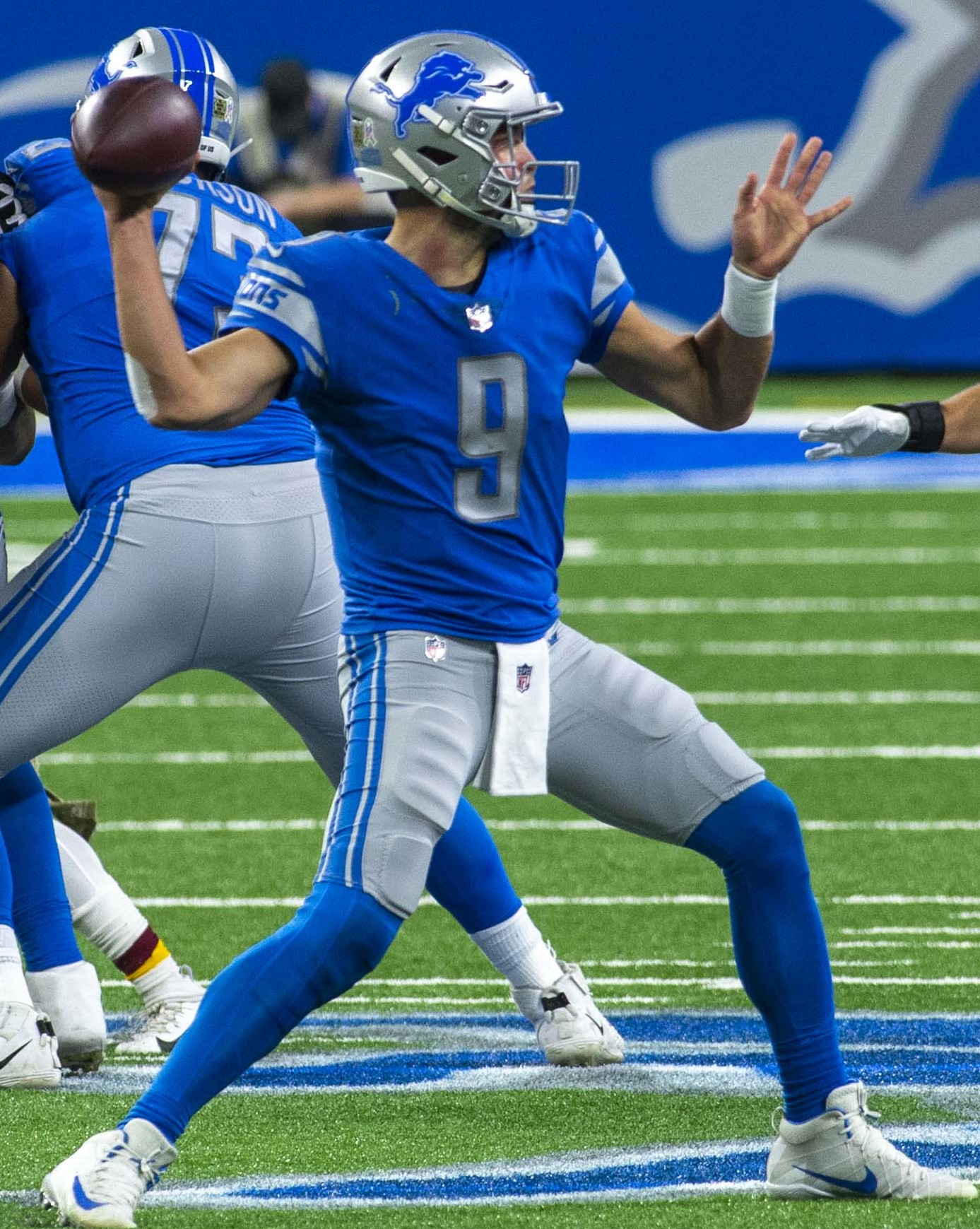
Matthew Stafford was selected first overall in the 2009 draft.

Detroit Lions' selections in the 2009 NFL draftSource: Pro Football Reference
Round	Pick #	Overall	Name	Position	College
1	1	1	Matthew Stafford	Quarterback	Georgia
1	20	20	Brandon Pettigrew	Tight end	Oklahoma State
2	1	33	Louis Delmas	Defensive back	Western Michigan
3	12	76	DeAndre Levy	Linebacker	Wisconsin
3	18	82	Derrick Williams	Wide receiver	Penn State
4	15	115	Sammie Lee Hill	Defensive tackle	Stillman
6	19	192	Aaron Brown	Running back	TCU
7	19	228	Lydon Murtha	Tackle	Nebraska
7	26	235	Zack Follett	Linebacker	California
7	46	255	Dan Gronkowski	Tight end	Maryland

== 2010 draft ==
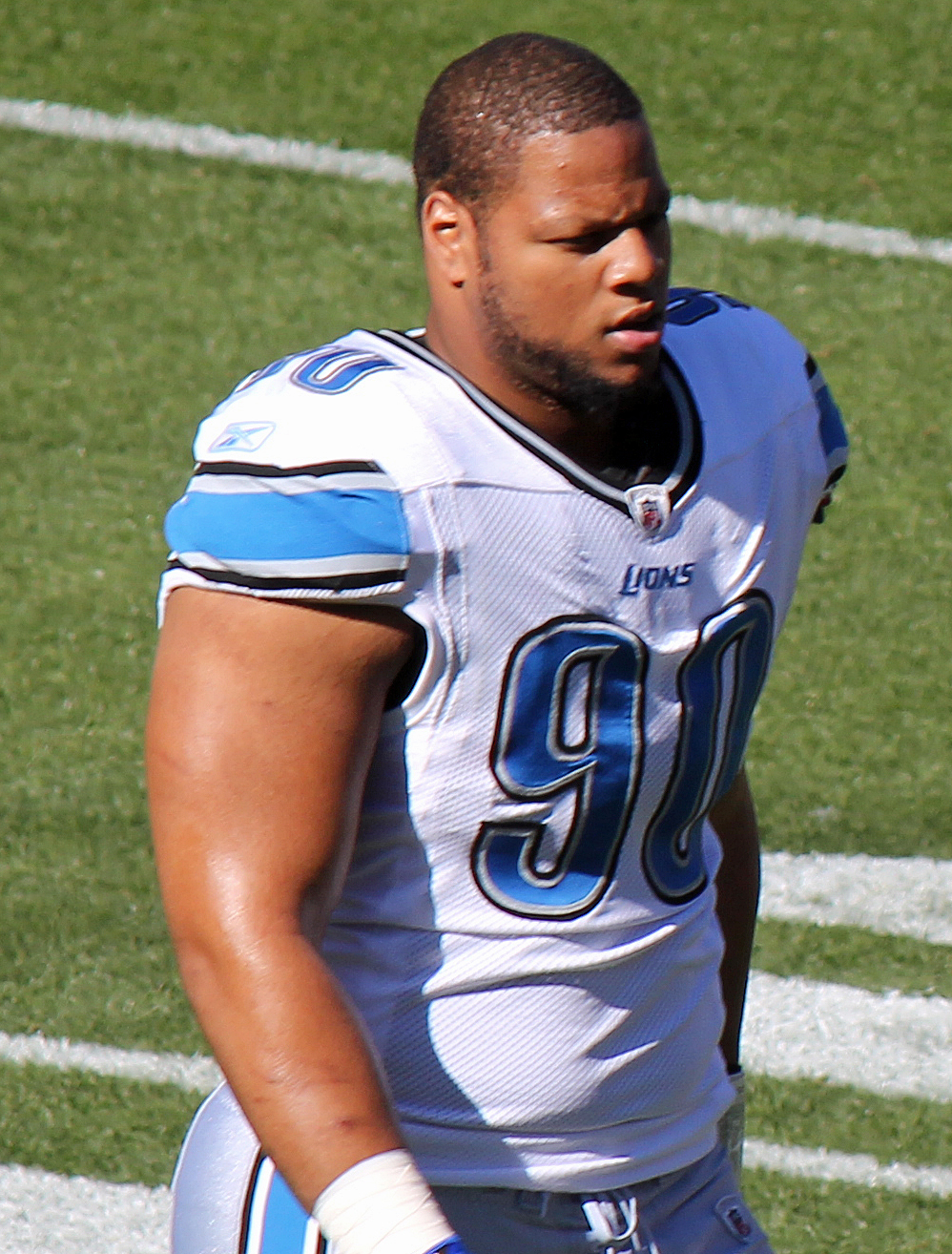
Ndamukong Suh was selected second overall in the 2010 draft.

Detroit Lions' selections in the 2010 NFL draftSource: Pro Football Reference
Round	Pick #	Overall	Name	Position	College
1	2	2	Ndamukong Suh	Defensive tackle	Nebraska
1	30	30	Jahvid Best	Running back	California
3	2	66	Amari Spievey	Defensive back	Iowa
4	30	128	Jason Fox	Tackle	Miami (FL)
7	6	213	Willie Young	Defensive end	NC State
7	48	255	Tim Toone	Wide receiver	Weber State

== 2011 draft ==
Detroit Lions' selections in the 2011 NFL draftSource: Pro Football Reference
Round	Pick #	Overall	Name	Position	College
1	13	13	Nick Fairley	Defensive tackle	Auburn
2	12	44	Titus Young	Wide receiver	Boise State.
2	25	57	Mikel Leshoure	Running back	Illinois
5	26	157	Doug Hogue	Linebacker	Syracuse
7	6	209	Johnny Culbreath	Offensive line	South Carolina State

== 2012 draft ==
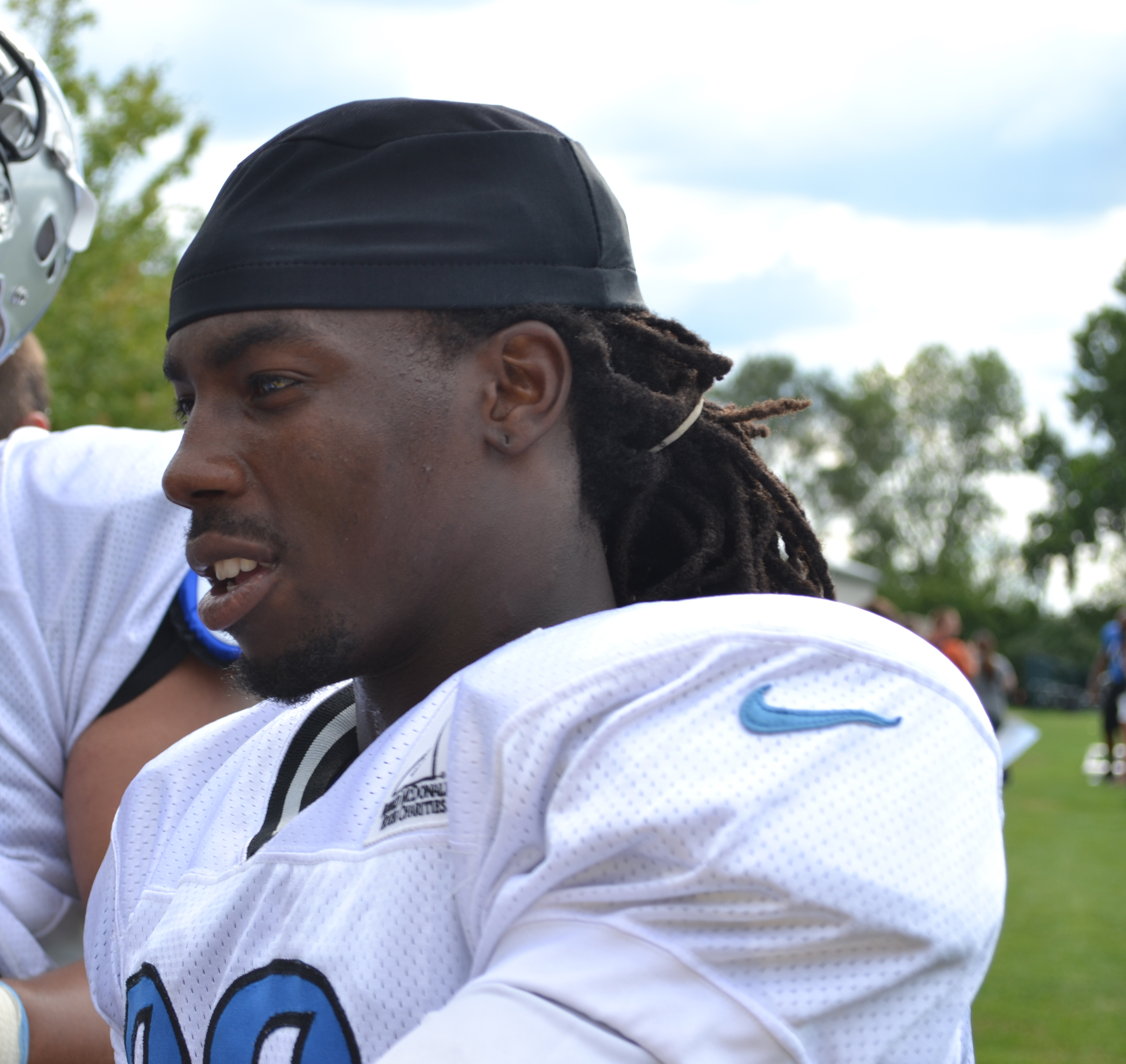
Bill Bentley was the Lions' third-round selection in the 2012 draft.

Detroit Lions' selections in the 2012 NFL draftSource: Pro Football Reference
Round	Pick #	Overall	Name	Position	College
1	23	23	Riley Reiff	Tackle	Iowa
2	22	54	Ryan Broyles	Wide receiver	Oklahoma
3	22	85	Bill Bentley	Defensive back	Louisiana
4	30	125	Ronnell Lewis	Linebacker	Oklahoma
5	3	138	Tahir Whitehead	Linebacker	Temple
5	13	148	Chris Greenwood	Defensive back	Albion
6	26	196	Jonte Green	Defensive back	New Mexico State
7	16	223	Travis Lewis	Linebacker	Oklahoma

== 2013 draft ==
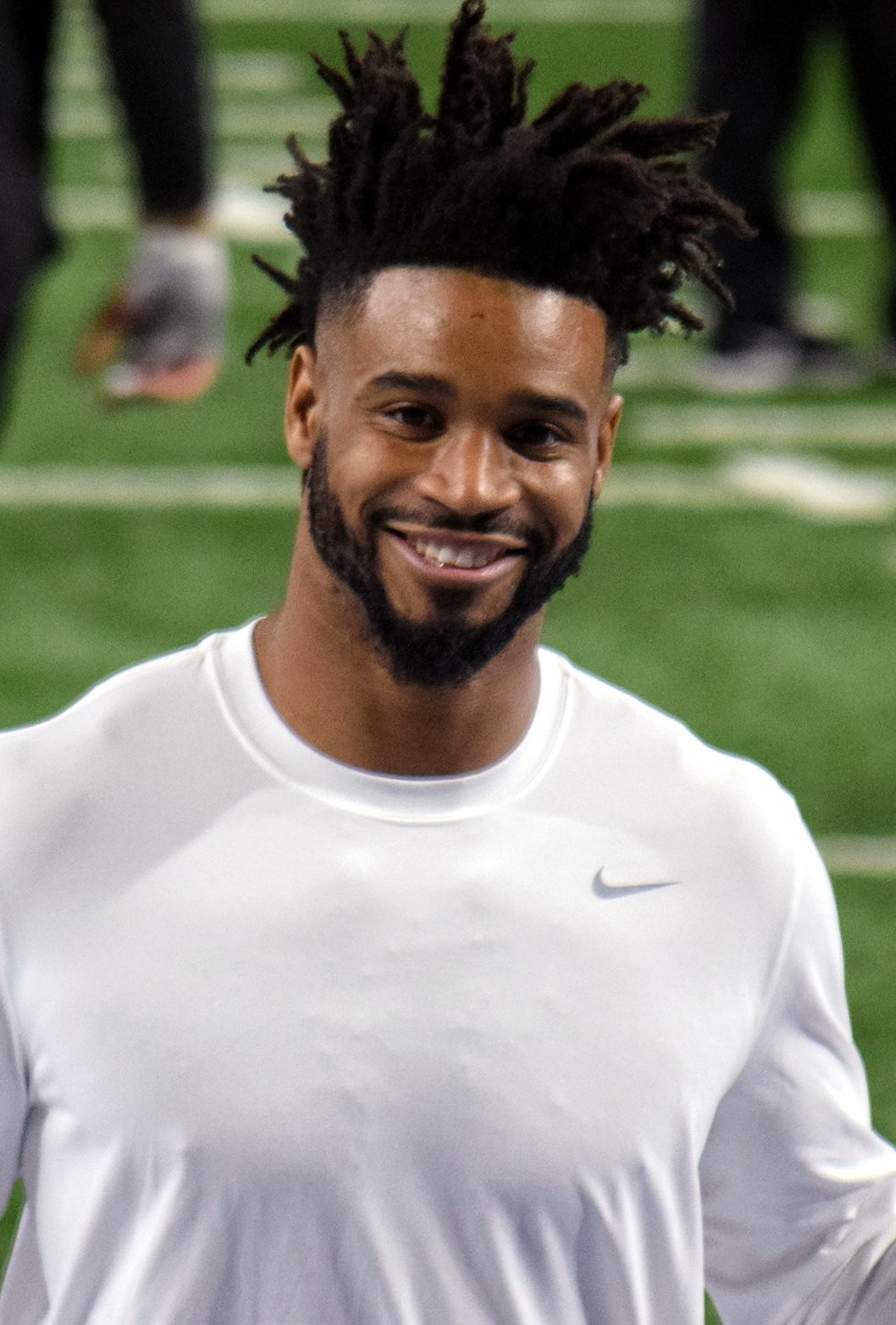
Darius Slay was the Lions' second-round selection in the 2013 draft.

Detroit Lions' selections in the 2013 NFL draftSource: Pro Football Reference
Round	Pick #	Overall	Name	Position	College
1	5	5	Ezekiel Ansah	Defensive end	BYU
2	4	36	Darius Slay	Defensive back	Mississippi State
3	3	65	Larry Warford	Guard	Kentucky
4	35	132	Devin Taylor	Defensive end	South Carolina
5	32	165	Sam Martin	Punter	Appalachian State
6	3	171	Corey Fuller	Wide receiver	Virginia Tech
6	31	199	Theo Riddick	Running back	Notre Dame
7	5	211	Michael Williams	Tight end	Alabama
7	39	245	Brandon Hepburn	Linebacker	Florida A&M

== 2014 draft ==
Detroit Lions' selections in the 2014 NFL draftSource: Pro Football Reference
Round	Pick #	Overall	Name	Position	College
1	10	10	Eric Ebron	Tight end	North Carolina
2	8	40	Kyle Van Noy	Linebacker	BYU
3	12	76	Travis Swanson	Center	Arkansas
4	33	133	Nevin Lawson	Defensive back	Utah State
4	36	136	Larry Webster III	Defensive end	Bloomsburg
5	18	158	Caraun Reid	Defensive tackle	Princeton
6	13	189	T. J. Jones	Wide receiver	Notre Dame
7	14	229	Nate Freese	Kicker	Boston College

== 2015 draft ==
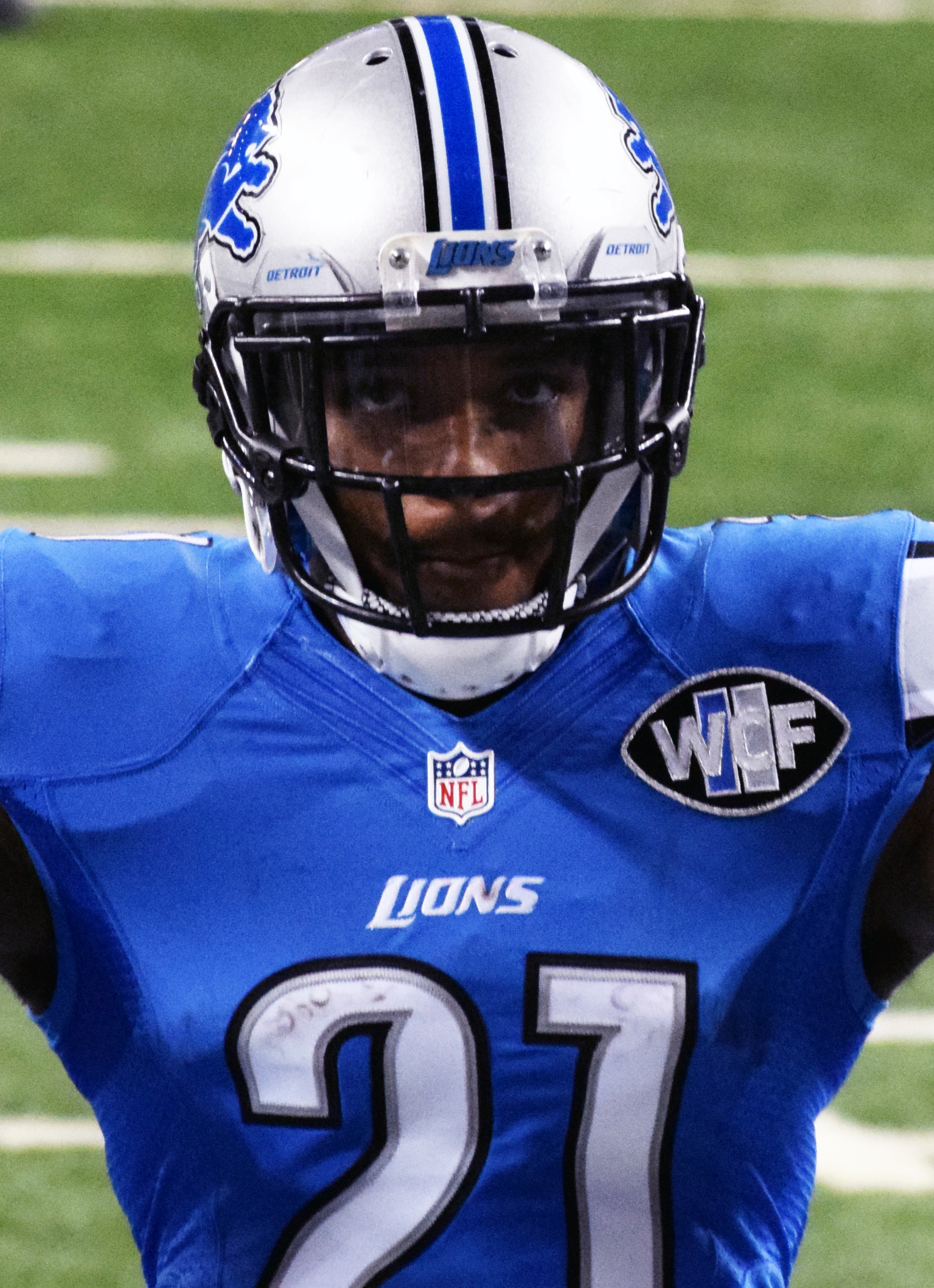
Ameer Abdullah was the Lions' second-round selection in the 2015 draft.

Detroit Lions' selections in the 2015 NFL draftSource: Pro Football Reference
Round	Pick #	Overall	Name	Position	College
1	28	28	Laken Tomlinson	Guard	Duke
2	22	54	Ameer Abdullah	Running back	Nebraska
3	16	80	Alex Carter	Cornerback	Stanford
4	14	113	Gabe Wright	Defensive tackle	Auburn
5	32	168	Michael Burton	Fullback	Rutgers
6	24	200	Quandre Diggs	Cornerback	Texas
7	23	240	Corey Robinson	Tackle	South Carolina

== 2016 draft ==
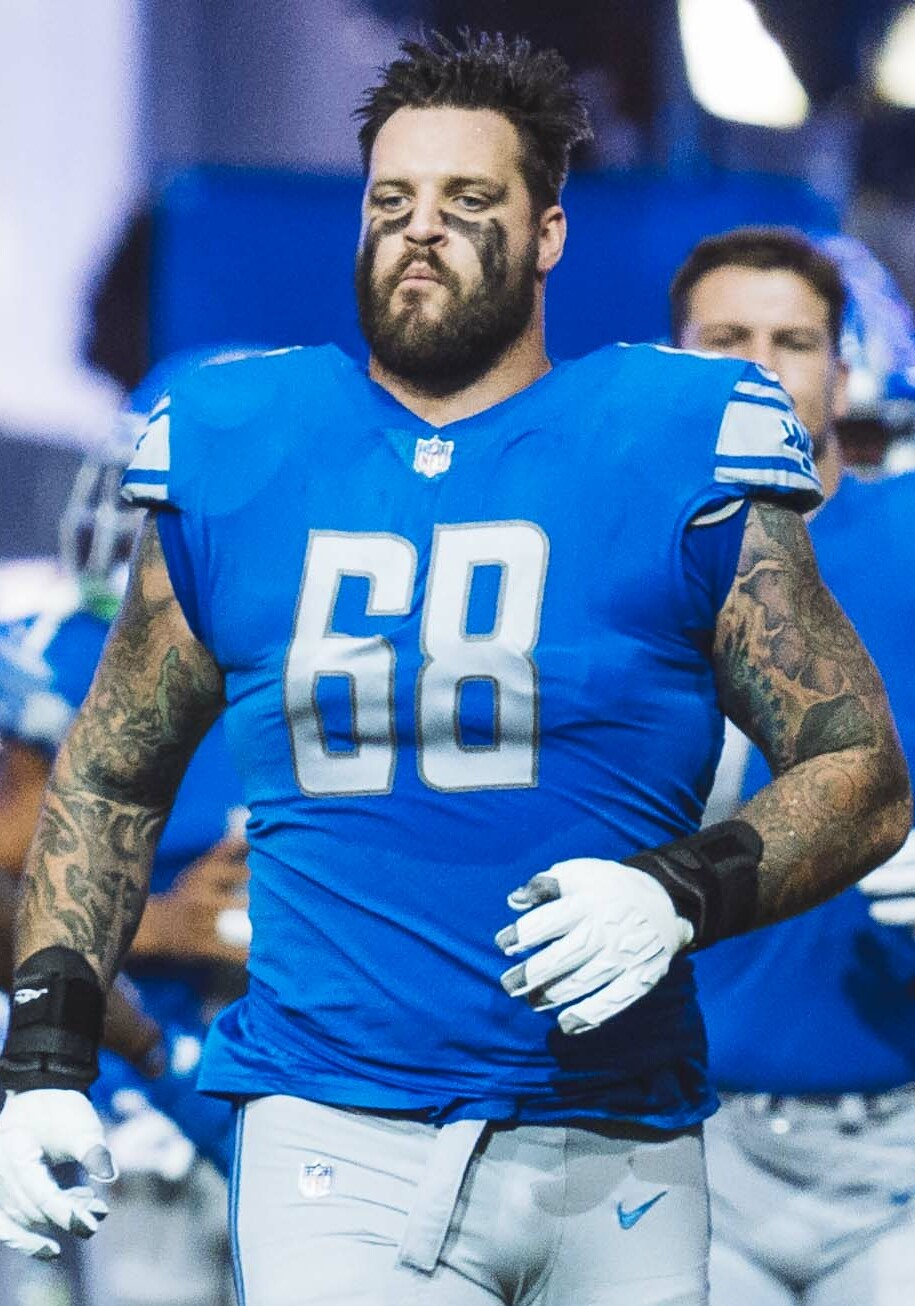
Taylor Decker was the Lions' first-round selection in the 2016 draft.

Detroit Lions' selections in the 2016 NFL draftSource: Pro Football Reference
Round	Pick #	Overall	Name	Position	College
1	16	16	Taylor Decker	Tackle	Ohio State
2	15	46	A'Shawn Robinson	Defensive tackle	Alabama
3	33	95	Graham Glasgow	Center	Michigan
4	13	111	Miles Killebrew	Safety	Southern Utah
5	12	151	Joe Dahl	Guard	Washington State
5	32	169	Antwione Williams	Linebacker	Georgia Southern
6	16	191	Jake Rudock	Quarterback	Michigan
6	27	202	Anthony Zettel	Defensive tackle	Penn State
6	35	210	Jimmy Landes	Long snapper	Baylor
7	15	236	Dwayne Washington	Running back	Washington

== 2017 draft ==
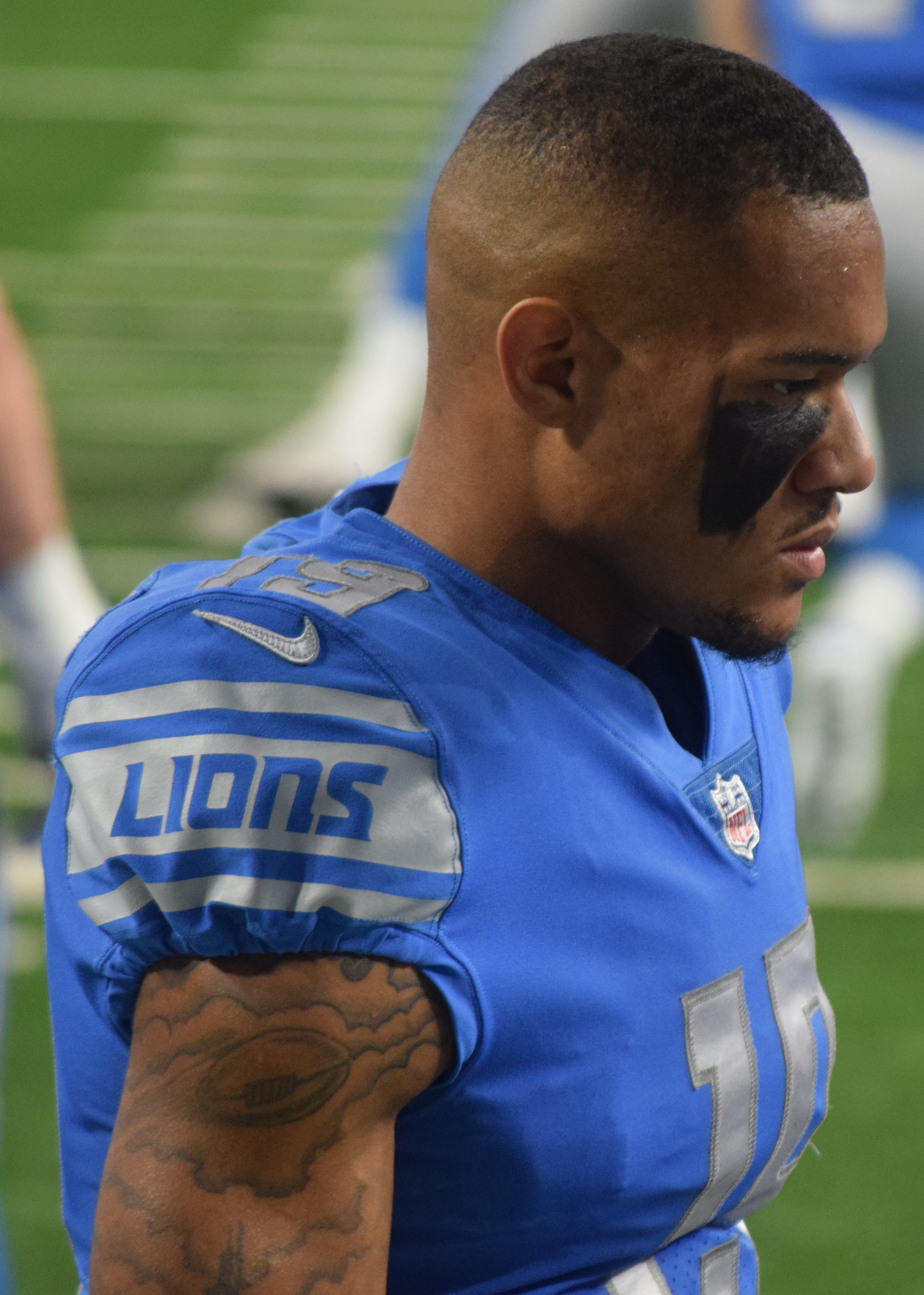
Kenny Golladay was the Lions' third-round selection in the 2017 draft.

Detroit Lions' selections in the 2017 NFL draftSource: Pro Football Reference
Round	Pick #	Overall	Name	Position	College
1	21	21	Jarrad Davis	Linebacker	Florida
2	21	53	Teez Tabor	Cornerback	Florida
3	32	96	Kenny Golladay	Wide receiver	Northern Illinois
4	18	124	Jalen Reeves-Maybin	Linebacker	Tennessee
4	21	127	Michael Roberts	Tight end	Toledo
5	21	165	Jamal Agnew	Cornerback	San Diego
6	21	205	Jeremiah Ledbetter	Defensive end	Arkansas
6	32	215	Brad Kaaya	Quarterback	Miami
7	32	250	Pat O'Connor	Defensive end	Eastern Michigan

== 2018 draft ==
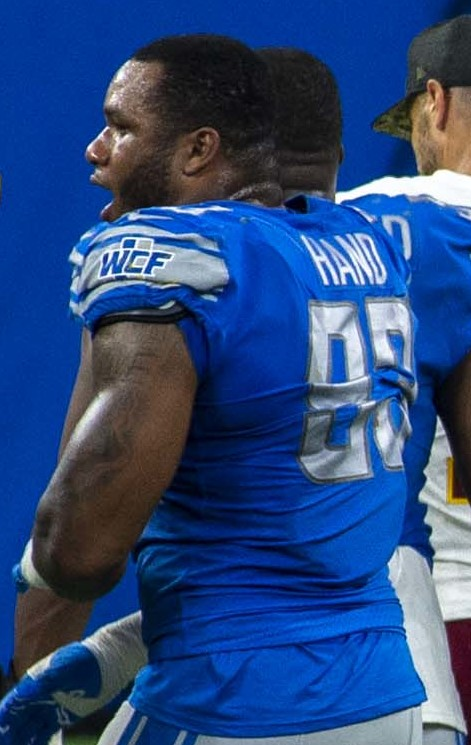
Da'Shawn Hand was the Lions' fourth-round selection in the 2018 draft.

Detroit Lions' selections in the 2018 NFL draftSource: Pro Football Reference
Round	Pick #	Overall	Name	Position	College
1	20	20	Frank Ragnow	Center	Arkansas
2	11	43	Kerryon Johnson	Running back	Auburn
3	18	82	Tracy Walker	Safety	Louisiana
4	14	114	Da'Shawn Hand	Defensive end	Alabama
5	16	153	Tyrell Crosby	Tackle	Oregon
7	19	237	Nick Bawden	Running back	San Diego State

== 2019 draft ==
Detroit Lions' selections in the 2019 NFL draftSource: Pro Football Reference
Round	Pick #	Overall	Name	Position	College
1	8	8	T. J. Hockenson	Tight end	Iowa
2	11	43	Jahlani Tavai	Linebacker	Hawaii
3	17	81	Will Harris	Safety	Boston College
4	15	117	Austin Bryant	Defensive end	Clemson
5	8	146	Amani Oruwariye	Cornerback	Penn State
6	11	184	Travis Fulgham	Wide receiver	Old Dominion
6	13	186	Ty Johnson	Running back	Maryland
7	10	224	Isaac Nauta	Tight end	Georgia
7	15	229	P. J. Johnson	Defensive end	Arizona

== 2020 draft ==
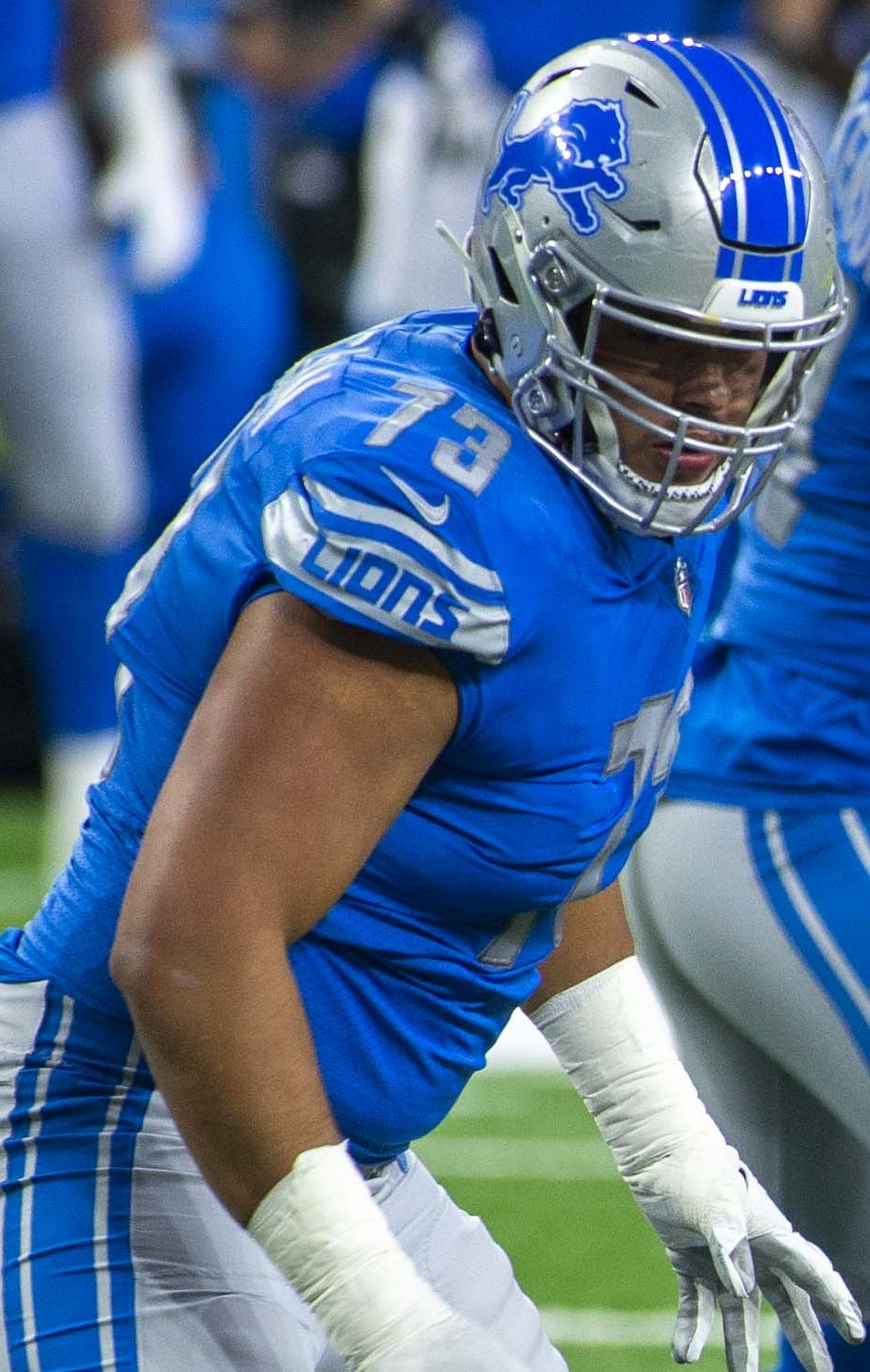
Jonah Jackson was one of the Lions' third-round selections in the 2020 draft.

Detroit Lions' selections in the 2020 NFL draftSource: Pro Football Reference
Round	Pick #	Overall	Name	Position	College
1	3	3	Jeff Okudah	Cornerback	Ohio State
2	3	35	D'Andre Swift	Running back	Georgia
3	3	67	Julian Okwara	Defensive end	Notre Dame
3	11	75	Jonah Jackson	Guard	Ohio State
4	15	121	Logan Stenberg	Guard	Kentucky
5	20	166	Quintez Cephus	Wide receiver	Wisconsin
5	26	172	Jason Huntley	Running back	New Mexico State
6	18	197	John Penisini	Defensive tackle	Utah
7	21	235	Jashon Cornell	Defensive tackle	Ohio State

== 2021 draft ==
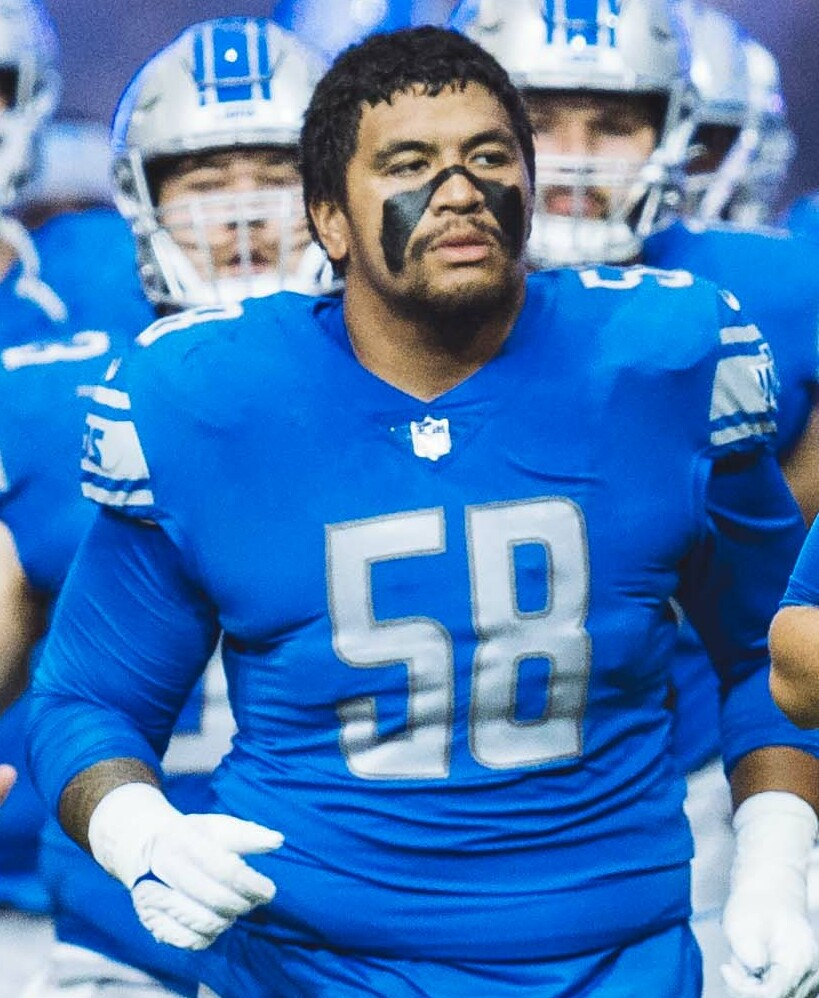
Penei Sewell was the Lions' first-round selection in the 2021 draft.

Detroit Lions' selections in the 2021 NFL draftSource: Pro Football Reference
Round	Pick #	Overall	Name	Position	College
1	7	7	Penei Sewell	Offensive line	Oregon
2	9	41	Levi Onwuzurike	Defensive line	Washington
3	8	72	Alim McNeill	Defensive tackle	NC State
3	37	101	Ifeatu Melifonwu	Defensive back	Syracuse
4	7	112	Amon-Ra St. Brown	Wide receiver	USC
4	8	113	Derrick Barnes	Defensive end	Purdue
7	30	257	Jermar Jefferson	Running back	Oregon State

== 2022 draft ==
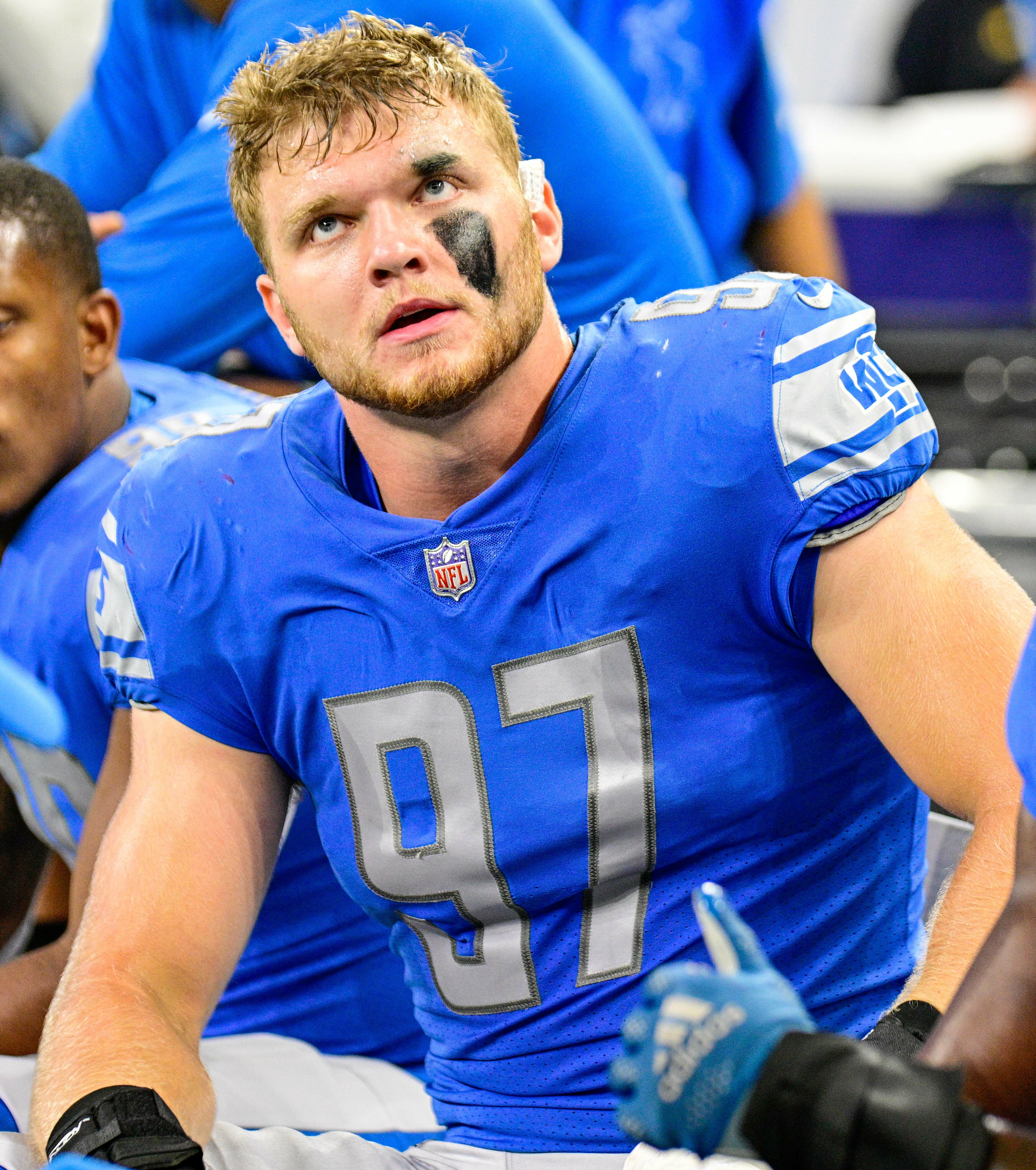
Aidan Hutchinson was the Lions' first-round selection and the second overall pick in the 2022 draft.

Detroit Lions' selections in the 2022 NFL draftSource: Pro Football Reference
Round	Pick #	Overall	Name	Position	College
1	2	2	Aidan Hutchinson	Defensive end	Michigan
1	12	12	Jameson Williams	Wide receiver	Alabama
2	14	46	Josh Paschal	Defensive end	Kentucky
3	33	97	Kerby Joseph	Defensive back	Illinois
5	34	177	James Mitchell	Tight end	Virginia Tech
6	9	188	Malcolm Rodriguez	Linebacker	Oklahoma State
6	38	217	James Houston	Linebacker	Jackson State
7	16	237	Chase Lucas	Defensive back	Arizona State

== 2023 draft ==
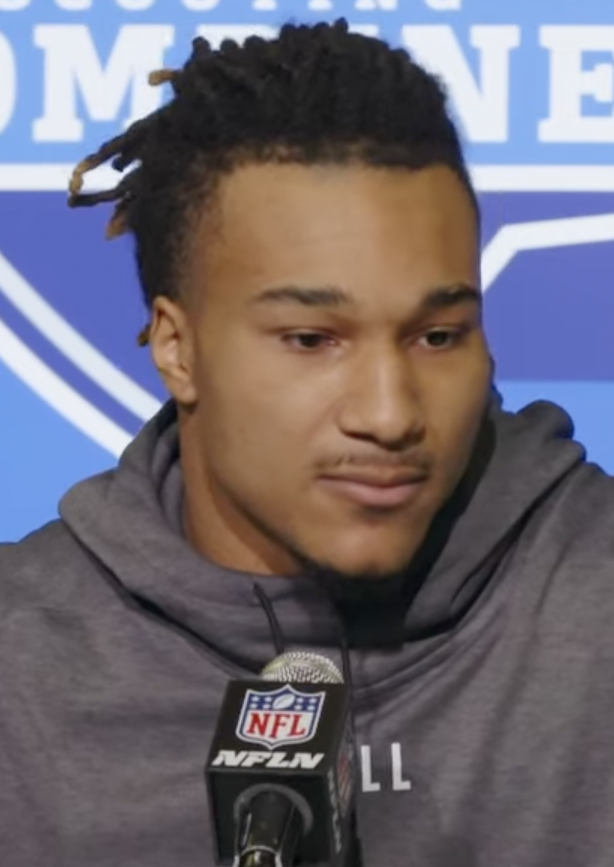
Brian Branch was one of the Lions' second-round selections in the 2023 draft.

Detroit Lions' selections in the 2023 NFL draftSource: Pro Football Reference
Round	Pick #	Overall	Name	Position	College
1	12	12	Jahmyr Gibbs	Running back	Alabama
1	18	18	Jack Campbell	Linebacker	Iowa
2	3	34	Sam LaPorta	Tight end	Iowa
2	14	45	Brian Branch	Defensive back	Alabama
3	5	68	Hendon Hooker	Quarterback	Tennessee
3	33	96	Brodric Martin	Defensive tackle	Western Kentucky
5	17	152	Colby Sorsdal	Offensive line	William & Mary
7	2	219	Antoine Green	Wide receiver	North Carolina

== 2024 draft ==
Detroit Lions' selections in the 2024 NFL draftSource: Pro Football Reference
Round	Pick #	Overall	Name	Position	College
1	24	24	Terrion Arnold	Defensive back	Alabama
2	29	61	Ennis Rakestraw Jr.	Defensive back	Missouri
4	26	126	Giovanni Manu	Tackle	UBC
4	32	132	Sione Vaki	Safety	Utah
6	13	189	Mekhi Wingo	Defensive tackle	LSU
6	34	210	Christian Mahogany	Guard	Boston College

== 2025 draft ==
Detroit Lions' selections in the 2025 NFL draftSource: Pro Football Reference
Round	Pick #	Overall	Name	Position	College
1	28	28	Tyleik Williams	Defensive tackle	Ohio State
2	25	57	Tate Ratledge	Offensive line	Georgia
3	6	70	Isaac TeSlaa	Wide receiver	Arkansas
5	35	171	Miles Frazier	Guard	LSU
6	20	196	Ahmed Hassanein	Defensive end	Boise State
7	14	230	Dan Jackson	Safety	Georgia
7	28	244	Dominic Lovett	Wide receiver	Georgia

== 2026 draft ==
Detroit Lions' selections in the 2026 NFL draftSource: Pro Football Reference
Round	Pick #	Overall	Name	Position	College
1	17	17	Blake Miller	Offensive tackle	Clemson
2	12	44	Derrick Moore	Defensive end	Michigan
4	18	118	Jimmy Rolder	Linebacker	Michigan
5	17	157	Keith Abney II	Cornerback	Arizona State
5	28	168	Kendrick Law	Wide receiver	Kentucky
6	24	205	Skyler Gill-Howard	Defensive tackle	Texas Tech
7	6	222	Tyre West	Defensive end	Tennessee
