= Woodbridge (CDP), New Jersey =

Populated place in Middlesex County, New Jersey, US

Woodbridge, New Jersey
- Census-designated place
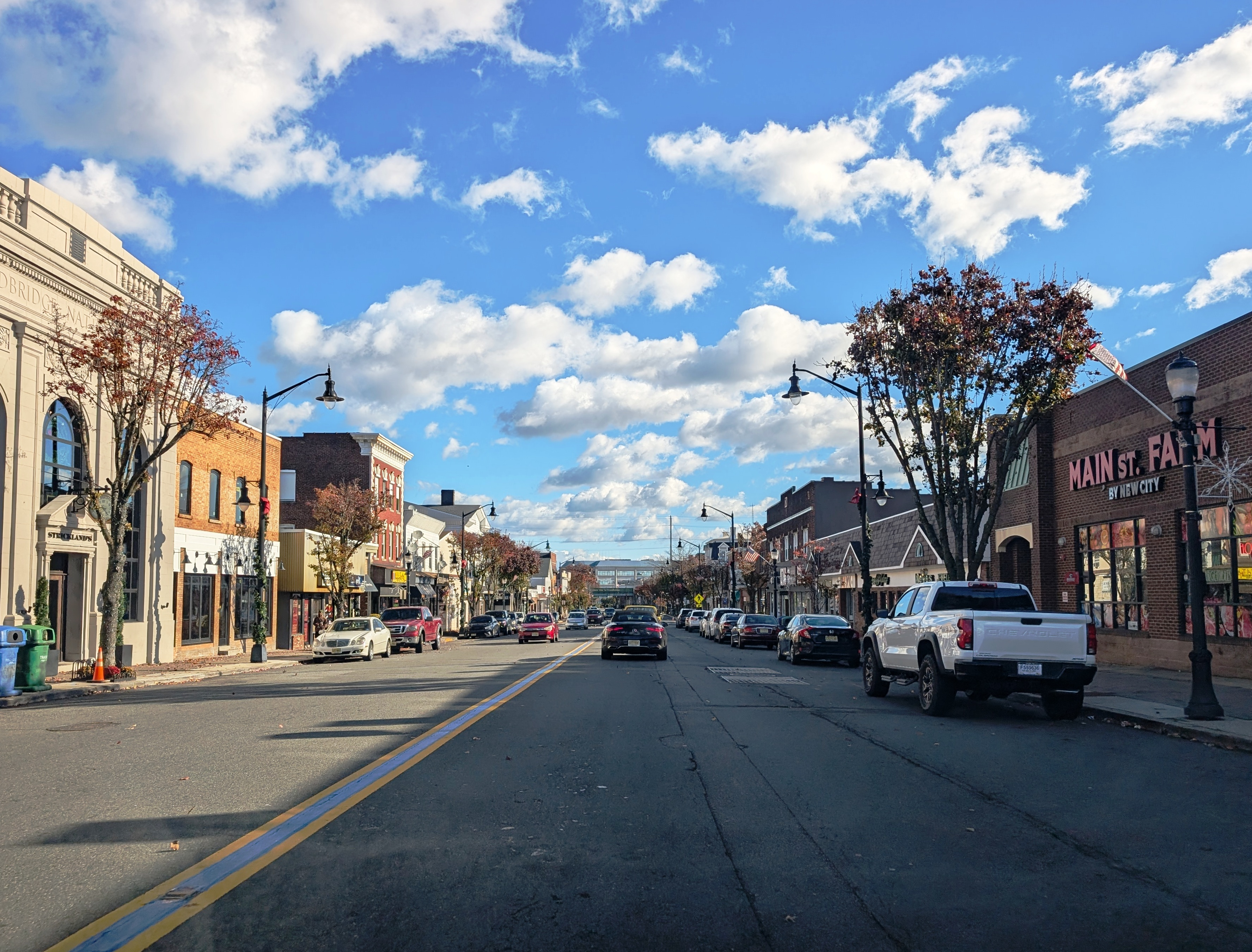
- Main Street (CR 514) in the center of Woodbridge

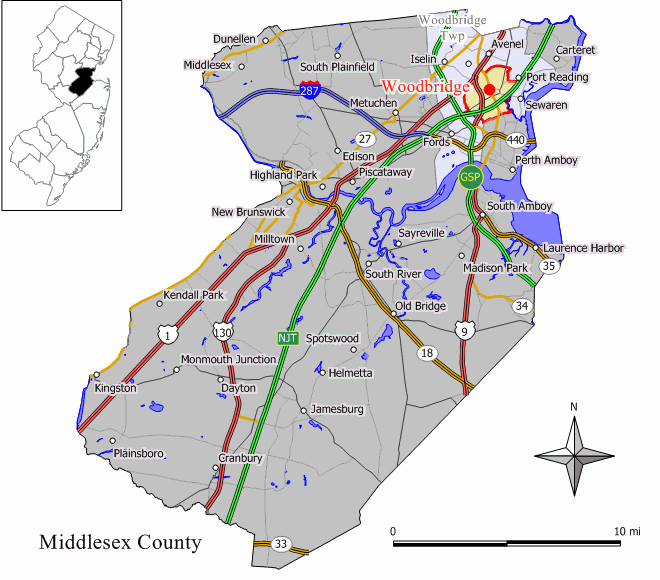
- Map of Woodbridge CDP highlighted within Middlesex County. Inset: Location of Middlesex County in New Jersey.

- Location in Middlesex County Location in New Jersey Location in the United States
- Coordinates: 40.554981°N 74.285014°W
- Country: United States
- State: New Jersey
- County: Middlesex
- Township: Woodbridge

Area
  - Total: 4.63 sq mi (12.00 km^{2})
  - Land: 4.61 sq mi (11.93 km^{2})
  - Water: 0.027 sq mi (0.07 km^{2}) 0.63%
- Elevation: 30 ft (9 m)

Population (2020)
  - Total: 19,839
  - Density: 4,308.3/sq mi (1,663.45/km^{2})
- Time zone: UTC−05:00 (Eastern (EST))
  - Summer (DST): UTC−04:00 (Eastern (EDT))
- ZIP Code: 07095
- Area codes: 732/848
- FIPS code: 34-81950
- GNIS feature ID: 02390527

Woodbridge is an unincorporated community and census-designated place (CDP) within Woodbridge Township, in Middlesex County, New Jersey, United States. As of the 2020 census, the CDP's population was 19,839, out of 103,639 in all of Woodbridge Township. Despite the similarity in the name of the CDP and the township, the two are not coextensive; the CDP occupies 15.7% of the township's 24.51 square miles (63.5 km^{2}).

== Geography ==
Woodbridge is located in northeastern Middlesex County and forms the central area of Woodbridge Township. It is bordered by several other communities within the township: Sewaren to the east, Port Reading to the northeast, Avenel to the north, Iselin to the northwest, Menlo Park Terrace touching the westernmost point of the CDP, Fords to the southwest, and Hopelawn to the south. The city of Perth Amboy borders Woodbridge CDP to the southeast.

The New Jersey Turnpike runs through the southern part of Woodbridge CDP, while the Garden State Parkway runs along the community's western edge. Turnpike Exit 11 (Parkway Exit 129), in the southwest corner of the community, connects the two highways. U.S. Route 1 runs along the northwestern edge of the community, and U.S. Route 9 crosses the community west of its center. New Jersey Route 35 (Amboy Avenue) runs north–south through the heart of Woodbridge CDP.

According to the U.S. Census Bureau, the Woodbridge CDP has a total area of 4.63 square miles (11.99 km^{2}), including 0.03 square miles (0.08 km^{2}) of water (0.63%).

== Demographics ==
Historical population
Census	Pop.	Note	%±
1990	17,434		—
2000	18,309		5.0%
2010	19,265		5.2%
2020	19,839		3.0%
Population sources: 1950 1960 1970; 1980 1990 2000; 2010 2020

Woodbridge first appeared as a census designated place in the 1990 U.S. census.

=== 2020 census ===
Woodbridge CDP, New Jersey – Racial and ethnic composition Note: the US Census treats Hispanic/Latino as an ethnic category. This table excludes Latinos from the racial categories and assigns them to a separate category. Hispanics/Latinos may be of any race.
Race / Ethnicity (NH = Non-Hispanic)	Pop 2000	Pop 2010	Pop 2020	% 2000	% 2010	% 2020
White alone (NH)	12,528	9,773	7,688	68.43%	50.73%	38.75%
Black or African American alone (NH)	1,336	1,645	2,282	7.30%	8.54%	11.50%
Native American or Alaska Native alone (NH)	10	30	23	0.05%	0.16%	0.12%
Asian alone (NH)	2,343	3,979	4,388	12.80%	20.65%	22.12%
Native Hawaiian or Pacific Islander alone (NH)	4	5	4	0.02%	0.03%	0.02%
Other race alone (NH)	37	51	143	0.20%	0.26%	0.72%
Mixed race or Multiracial (NH)	250	276	486	1.37%	1.43%	2.45%
Hispanic or Latino (any race)	1,801	3,506	4,825	9.84%	18.20%	24.32%
Total	18,309	19,265	19,839	100.00%	100.00%	100.00%

=== 2010 census ===
The 2010 United States census counted 19,265 people, 7,378 households, and 5,120 families in the CDP. The population density was 5,008.8 people per square mile (1,933.9 people/km^{2}). There were 7,728 housing units at an average density of 2,009.2 units per square mile (775.8 units/km^{2}). The racial makeup was 59.68% (11,497) White, 9.36% (1,804) Black or African American, 0.38% (73) Native American, 20.83% (4,012) Asian, 0.06% (12) Pacific Islander, 6.84% (1,318) from other races, and 2.85% (549) from two or more races. Hispanic or Latino of any race were 18.20% (3,506) of the population.

Of the 7,378 households, 32.6% had children under the age of 18; 51.9% were married couples living together; 12.6% had a female householder with no husband present and 30.6% were non-families. Of all households, 25.5% were made up of individuals and 9.4% had someone living alone who was 65 years of age or older. The average household size was 2.60 and the average family size was 3.14.

22.3% of the population were under the age of 18, 7.3% from 18 to 24, 32.7% from 25 to 44, 26.0% from 45 to 64, and 11.7% who were 65 years of age or older. The median age was 36.6 years. For every 100 females, the population had 93.0 males. For every 100 females ages 18 and older there were 88.9 males.

=== 2000 census ===
As of the 2000 United States census there were 18,309 people, 7,290 households, and 4,847 families living in the CDP. The population density was 1,826.7 people/km^{2} (4,731 people/mi^{2}). There were 7,512 housing units at an average density of 749.5 units/km^{2} (1,941 units/mi^{2}). The racial makeup of the CDP was 74.44% White, 7.64% African American, 0.12% Native American, 12.85% Asian, 0.02% Pacific Islander, 2.96% from other races, and 1.97% from two or more races. Hispanic or Latino of any race were 9.84% of the population.

There were 7,290 households, out of which 29.3% had children under the age of 18 living with them, 50.9% were married couples living together, 11.8% had a female householder with no husband present, and 33.5% were non-families. 27.2% of all households were made up of individuals, and 10.9% had someone living alone who was 65 years of age or older. The average household size was 2.49 and the average family size was 3.06.

In the CDP the population was spread out, with 21.4% under the age of 18, 7.4% from 18 to 24, 35.9% from 25 to 44, 21.5% from 45 to 64, and 13.7% who were 65 years of age or older. The median age was 36 years. For every 100 females, there were 92.1 males. For every 100 females age 18 and over, there were 88.0 males.

The median income for a household in the CDP was $60,594, and the median income for a family was $70,184. Males had a median income of $50,071 versus $34,928 for females. The per capita income for the CDP was $26,728. About 3.9% of families and 5.8% of the population were below the poverty line, including 6.2% of those under age 18 and 8.0% of those age 65 or over.

== See also ==
- List of neighborhoods in Woodbridge Township, New Jersey
- List of neighborhoods in Edison, New Jersey
