= Boynton Beach =

Boynton Beach may refer to:

- Boynton Beach, Florida
- Boynton Beach, New Jersey
