= Menlo Park Terrace, New Jersey =

Populated place in Middlesex County, New Jersey, US

- Census-designated place
- Location in Middlesex County Location in New Jersey Location in the United States
- Coordinates: 40°33′12″N 74°19′27″W
- Country: United States
- State: New Jersey
- County: Middlesex
- Township: Woodbridge
- Named for: Menlo Park

Area
  - Total: 0.372 sq mi (0.96 km^{2})
  - Land: 0.372 sq mi (0.96 km^{2})
  - Water: 0.0 sq mi (0 km^{2})

Population (2020)
  - Total: 2,806
  - Density: 7,543/sq mi (2,912/km^{2})
- ZIP Code: 08840
- FIPS code: 34-45450

Menlo Park Terrace is an unincorporated community and census-designated place (CDP) in Woodbridge Township, Middlesex County, New Jersey, United States. As of the 2020 census, its population was 2,806.

== Geography ==
The community is in northeastern Middlesex County, in the western part of Woodbridge Township. It is bordered to the north and east by Iselin and to the south by Fords, both within Woodbridge Township, and to the west by the neighborhood of Menlo Park within Edison Township. It is located on the northwest side of U.S. Route 1, between Menlo Park Mall and Woodbridge Center at Exit 130 of the Garden State Parkway. US 1 leads southwest 9 miles (14 km) to New Brunswick, the Middlesex county seat, and northeast 16 miles (26 km) to Newark.

According to the U.S. Census Bureau, the Menlo Park Terrace CDP has an area of 0.37 square miles (0.96 km^{2}), all land. The community is within the watershed of the South Branch of the Rahway River.

== Demographics ==
Historical population
Census	Pop.	Note	%±
2020	2,806		—
U.S. Decennial Census; 2020

Menlo Park Terrace was first listed as a census designated place in the 2020 U.S. census.

=== 2020 census ===
As of the 2020 census, Menlo Park Terrace had a population of 2,806. The median age was 41.2 years. 18.6% of residents were under the age of 18 and 17.3% of residents were 65 years of age or older. For every 100 females there were 91.3 males, and for every 100 females age 18 and over there were 90.2 males age 18 and over.

100.0% of residents lived in urban areas, while 0.0% lived in rural areas.

There were 852 households in Menlo Park Terrace, of which 33.3% had children under the age of 18 living in them. Of all households, 67.8% were married-couple households, 9.9% were households with a male householder and no spouse or partner present, and 19.4% were households with a female householder and no spouse or partner present. About 11.9% of all households were made up of individuals and 6.6% had someone living alone who was 65 years of age or older.

There were 879 housing units, of which 3.1% were vacant. The homeowner vacancy rate was 2.1% and the rental vacancy rate was 7.2%.

Menlo Park Terrace CDP, New Jersey – Racial and ethnic composition Note: the US Census treats Hispanic/Latino as an ethnic category. This table excludes Latinos from the racial categories and assigns them to a separate category. Hispanics/Latinos may be of any race.
Race / Ethnicity (NH = Non-Hispanic)	Pop 2020	2020
White alone (NH)	917	32.68%
Black or African American alone (NH)	235	8.37%
Native American or Alaska Native alone (NH)	1	0.04%
Asian alone (NH)	1,051	37.46%
Native Hawaiian or Pacific Islander alone (NH)	0	0.00%
Other race alone (NH)	24	0.86%
Mixed race or Multiracial (NH)	58	2.07%
Hispanic or Latino (any race)	520	18.53%
Total	2,806	100.00%

== See also ==
- List of neighborhoods in Woodbridge Township, New Jersey
- Neighborhoods in Perth Amboy, New Jersey
- List of neighborhoods in Edison, New Jersey
