= Pumpkin Patch Brook =

Stream in Union and Middlesex Counties, New Jersey, U.S.

Coordinates: 40°36′44″N 74°20′35″W

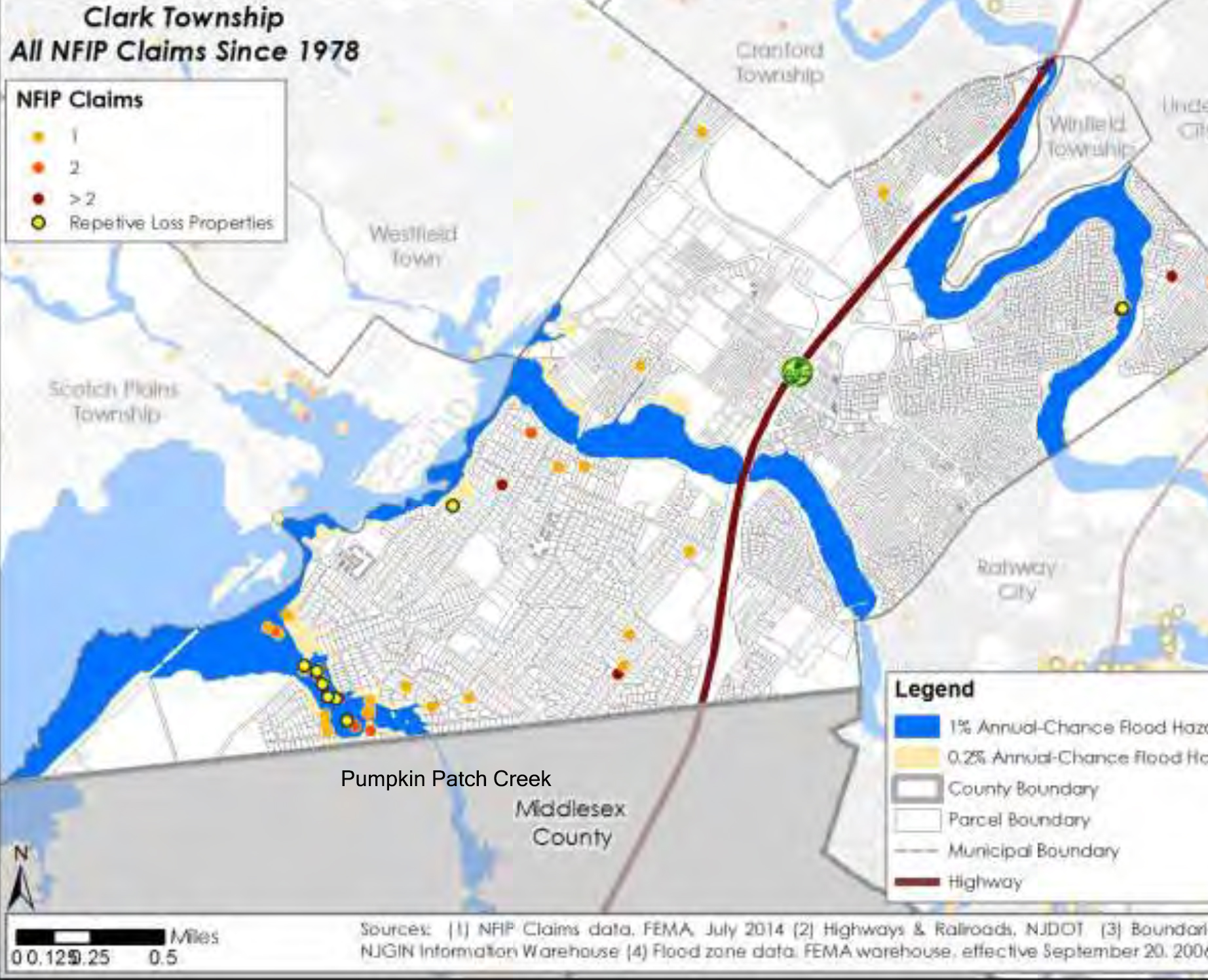
Pumpkin Patch Brook, Clark Township, New Jersey; FEMA map

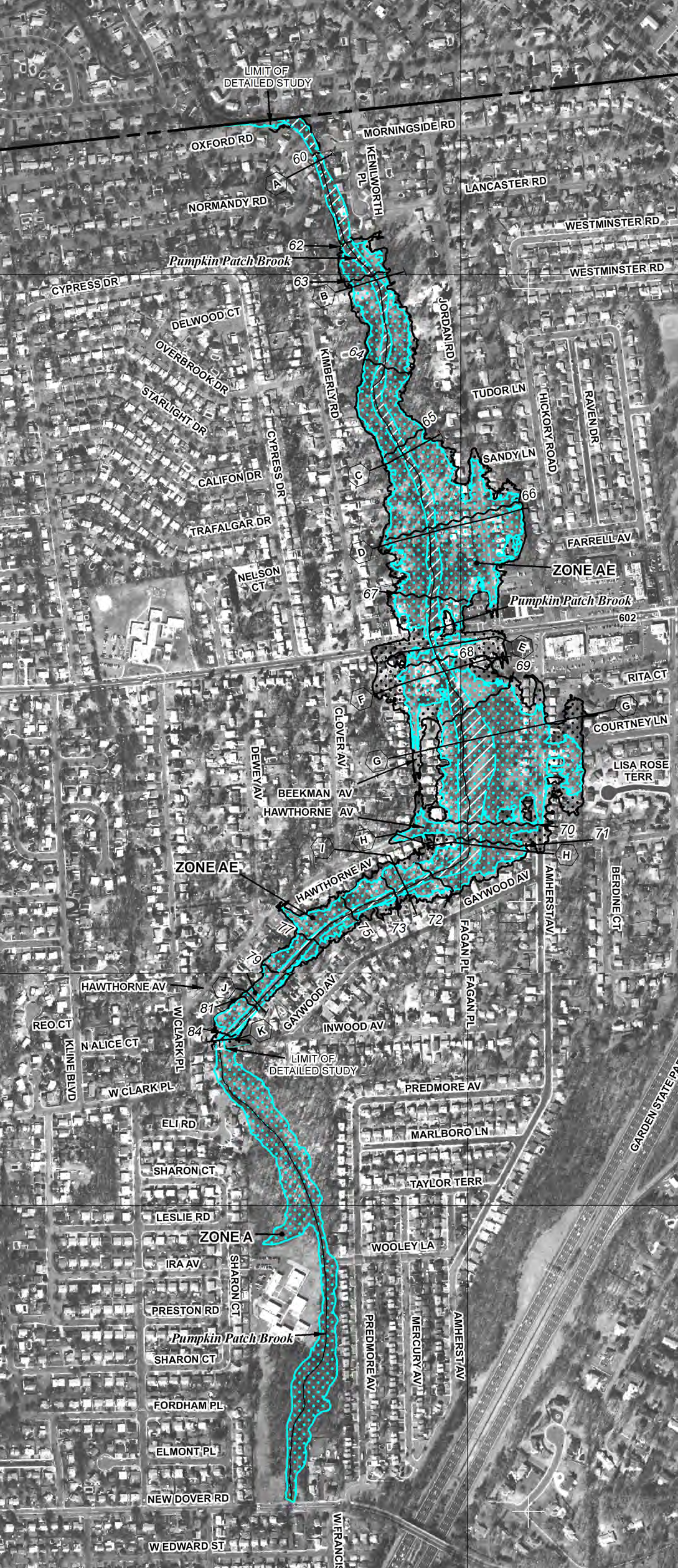
Pumpkin Patch Brook, FEMA Flood Hazard Map, Woodbridge Township, New Jersey

Pumpkin Patch Brook is a stream in Union and Middlesex counties in the U.S. state of New Jersey. It is a tributary of Robinson's Branch of the Rahway River.

It flows north from Woodbridge Township into Clark Township. At its mouth into Robinson's Branch there is a wetlands. It is frequently inundated by backflow from Robinson's Branch; generally only "relatively moderate" flooding is seen along this brook. Most of the flooding in Clark originates from Pumpkin Patch Brook. Severe fluvial flooding in both Clark Township and Woodbridge Township can be seen with hurricanes and nor'easters. Suburban development in both townships has increased surface water run-off over impervious land with "over the bank" flooding along the brook.
