= Fords, New Jersey =

Populated place in Middlesex County, New Jersey, US

- Census-designated place
- Map of Fords CDP in Middlesex County. Inset: Location of Middlesex County in New Jersey.

- Location in Middlesex County Location in New Jersey Location in the United States
- Coordinates: 40.543794°N 74.31292°W
- Country: United States
- State: New Jersey
- County: Middlesex
- Township: Woodbridge

Area
  - Total: 1.89 sq mi (4.90 km^{2})
  - Land: 1.89 sq mi (4.89 km^{2})
  - Water: 0.0039 sq mi (0.01 km^{2}) 0.15%
- Elevation: 138 ft (42 m)

Population (2020)
  - Total: 12,941
  - Density: 6,850.7/sq mi (2,645.1/km^{2})
- Time zone: UTC−05:00 (Eastern (EST))
  - Summer (DST): UTC−04:00 (Eastern (EDT))
- ZIP Code: 08863
- Area codes: 732/848
- FIPS code: 34-24030
- GNIS feature ID: 2389094

Fords is a census-designated place (CDP) in Woodbridge Township, in Middlesex County, in the U.S. state of new Jersey. As of the 2020 census, the CDP's population was 12,941.

== History ==
The area originally known as "Fords Corner" abuts neighboring Edison, part of which was once within Woodbridge Township, until an act of legislature in April 1870 apportioned land to what was then called Raritan Township.

== Geography ==
The community is in northeastern Middlesex County, in the southwest part of Woodbridge Township. Within the township it is bordered to the north by Menlo Park Terrace and Iselin, to the east by the Woodbridge CDP, to the southeast by Hopelawn, and to the south by Keasbey. To the west it is bordered by Edison Township.

The New Jersey Turnpike (Interstate 95) crosses the middle of Fords from west to east, while the Garden State Parkway forms much of the eastern border of the community. Most of the interchange connecting the two highways is in the neighboring Woodbridge CDP to the east. U.S. Route 1 crosses the northern part of Fords, paralleling the New Jersey Turnpike. Newark is 17 miles (27 km) to the northeast, while New Brunswick, the Middlesex county seat, is 9 miles (14 km) to the southwest.

According to the U.S. Census Bureau, the Fords CDP has a total area of 1.89 square miles (4.90 km^{2}), of which 0.002 square miles (0.005 km^{2}), or 0.11%, are water.

== Demographics ==
Historical population
Census	Pop.	Note	%±
1990	14,392		—
2000	15,032		4.4%
2010	15,187		1.0%
2020	12,941		−14.8%
Population sources: 1950 1960 1970; 1980 1990 2000; 2010 2020

Fords first appeared as a census designated place in the 1990 U.S. census.

=== Racial and ethnic composition ===
Fords CDP, New Jersey – Racial and ethnic composition Note: the US Census treats Hispanic/Latino as an ethnic category. This table excludes Latinos from the racial categories and assigns them to a separate category. Hispanics/Latinos may be of any race.
Race / Ethnicity (NH = Non-Hispanic)	Pop 2000	Pop 2010	Pop 2020	% 2000	% 2010	% 2020
White alone (NH)	10,070	7,782	5,423	66.99%	51.24%	41.91%
Black or African American alone (NH)	877	1,302	1,288	5.83%	8.57%	9.95%
Native American or Alaska Native alone (NH)	9	24	15	0.06%	0.16%	0.12%
Asian alone (NH)	2,402	3,119	2,130	15.98%	20.54%	16.46%
Native Hawaiian or Pacific Islander alone (NH)	0	1	1	0.00%	0.01%	0.01%
Other race alone (NH)	25	44	99	0.17%	0.29%	0.77%
Mixed race or Multiracial (NH)	261	272	358	1.74%	1.79%	2.77%
Hispanic or Latino (any race)	1,388	2,643	3,627	9.23%	17.40%	28.03%
Total	15,032	15,187	12,941	100.00%	100.00%	100.00%

=== 2020 census ===
As of the 2020 census, Fords had a population of 12,941. The median age was 39.8 years. 19.5% of residents were under the age of 18 and 15.6% of residents were 65 years of age or older. For every 100 females there were 95.7 males, and for every 100 females age 18 and over there were 93.1 males age 18 and over.

100.0% of residents lived in urban areas, while 0.0% lived in rural areas.

There were 4,592 households in Fords, of which 31.3% had children under the age of 18 living in them. Of all households, 52.3% were married-couple households, 15.9% were households with a male householder and no spouse or partner present, and 24.4% were households with a female householder and no spouse or partner present. About 21.0% of all households were made up of individuals and 8.5% had someone living alone who was 65 years of age or older.

There were 4,784 housing units, of which 4.0% were vacant. The homeowner vacancy rate was 1.0% and the rental vacancy rate was 5.5%.

=== 2010 census ===
The 2010 United States census counted 15,187 people, 5,386 households, and 4,013 families in the CDP. The population density was 5,767.5 people per square mile (2,226.8 people/km^{2}). There were 5,675 housing units at an average density of 2,155.2 units per square mile (832.1 units/km^{2}). The racial makeup was 60.99% (9,263) White, 9.21% (1,399) Black or African American, 0.28% (43) Native American, 20.70% (3,143) Asian, 0.01% (1) Pacific Islander, 5.99% (909) from other races, and 2.82% (429) from two or more races. Hispanic or Latino of any race were 17.40% (2,643) of the population.

Of the 5,386 households, 31.9% had children under the age of 18; 56.7% were married couples living together; 12.5% had a female householder with no husband present and 25.5% were non-families. Of all households, 21.1% were made up of individuals and 8.9% had someone living alone who was 65 years of age or older. The average household size was 2.82 and the average family size was 3.31.

21.7% of the population were under the age of 18, 8.8% from 18 to 24, 27.7% from 25 to 44, 28.6% from 45 to 64, and 13.2% who were 65 years of age or older. The median age was 39.2 years. For every 100 females, the population had 93.9 males. For every 100 females ages 18 and older there were 91.9 males.

=== 2000 census ===
As of the 2000 United States census there were 15,032 people, 5,591 households, and 4,014 families living in the CDP. The population density was 2,240.9 people/km^{2} (5,804 people/mi^{2}). There were 5,688 housing units at an average density of 847.9 units/km^{2} (2,196 units/mi^{2}). The racial makeup of the CDP was 72.86% White, 5.93% African American, 0.11% Native American, 16.11% Asian, 2.71% from other races, and 2.29% from two or more races. Hispanic or Latino of any race were 9.23% of the population.

There were 5,591 households, out of which 31.6% had children under the age of 18 living with them, 56.7% were married couples living together, 10.9% had a female householder with no husband present, and 28.2% were non-families. 23.4% of all households were made up of individuals, and 10.2% had someone living alone who was 65 years of age or older. The average household size was 2.69 and the average family size was 3.21.

In the CDP the population was spread out, with 22.5% under the age of 18, 7.0% from 18 to 24, 32.9% from 25 to 44, 22.4% from 45 to 64, and 15.3% who were 65 years of age or older. The median age was 38 years. For every 100 females, there were 93.3 males. For every 100 females age 18 and over, there were 92.4 males.

The median income for a household in the CDP was $61,015, and the median income for a family was $68,652. Males had a median income of $49,141 versus $36,591 for females. The per capita income for the CDP was $25,917. About 2.4% of families and 3.4% of the population were below the poverty line, including 3.5% of those under age 18 and 5.4% of those age 65 or over.

== Education ==
Fords has one elementary schools — Lafayette Estates School #25 — and one middle school, Fords Middle School (which opened in September 1960 as Fords Junior High School). These schools are all of which are a part of the Woodbridge Township School District.

== Notable people ==
People who were born in, residents of, or otherwise closely associated with Fords include:

- Nels N. Alling (1861–1955), sculptor who specialized in terra cotta architectural work
- Craig Coughlin (born 1958), politician, who has served in the New Jersey General Assembly since 2010, where he represents the 19th Legislative District
- Tim Mulqueen (born 1966), soccer goalkeeping coach and former goalkeeper who coached the US National Team at the 2008 Summer Olympics in Beijing

== See also ==
- List of neighborhoods in Woodbridge Township, New Jersey
