= Dina Hashem =

American comedian

- Hashem in 2023
- Education: Rutgers University
- Occupations: Comedian; writer; actress
- Years active: 2010s–present

Comedy career
- Medium: Stand-up
- Genres: Dark comedy; deadpan; observational comedy
- Subjects: Social awkwardness; identity; cultural issues; everyday life; religion; American politics
- Website: www.dinahashem.com

Dina Hashem is an American stand-up comedian, voice actress, and writer. She is known for her one-hour stand-up special, Dark Little Whispers, on Amazon Prime. Hashem is a two-time Emmy-nominee for her work writing on The Daily Show.

== Early life and education ==
Raised in the Iselin section of Woodbridge Township, New Jersey, Hashem is of Egyptian and Moroccan descent. Her experiences growing up in a Muslim household in New Jersey would later inform much of her comedic material.

She graduated from John F. Kennedy Memorial High School in 2007 and attended Rutgers University, where she studied English, philosophy, and Japanese. Hashem first performed stand-up while at Rutgers, entering a campus comedy contest to impress a classmate and winning.

== Career ==
Hashem began performing in the New York City comedy scene in the 2010s. She first gained widespread attention from a roast performance at The Stand NYC, after a YouTube video "Shy deadpan girl viciously defeats a big loud guy" received more than 5 million views. Hashem then made her Comedy Central debut, winning in her first appearance on Jeff Ross Presents Roast Battle.

She was named one of Team Coco's "Comics To Watch", before making her late-night stand-up debut on Conan on TBS. She has appeared on WTF with Marc Maron, 2 Dope Queens, Night Train with Wyatt Cenac, and Comedy Central's Stand-Up Featuring, which has nearly three million views.

Hashem's first hour-long special, Dark Little Whispers, on Amazon Prime was well-received by critics. Jason Zinoman of The New York Times wrote that Hashem is "one of the best deadpan artists working." The special was executive produced by comedian Sam Morril.

Hashem has written for Mindy Kaling's The Sex Lives of College Girls, as well as B.J. Novak's FX anthology series, The Premise. Hashem worked as a writer and voiced the recurring character Lamby the Lamb on Ramy Youssef's Amazon Prime series, #1 Happy Family USA. She has also voiced a character on Apple TV's Central Park.

As a writer on The Daily Show, Hashem has been nominated for two Emmy Awards and two Writers Guild of America Awards.

== Personal life ==
Hashem is an avid drummer and skateboarder. She has also used political satire to speak out against rhetoric targeting Arab Americans.
