= Woodbridge Township, New Jersey =

Township in Middlesex County, New Jersey, US

- Township
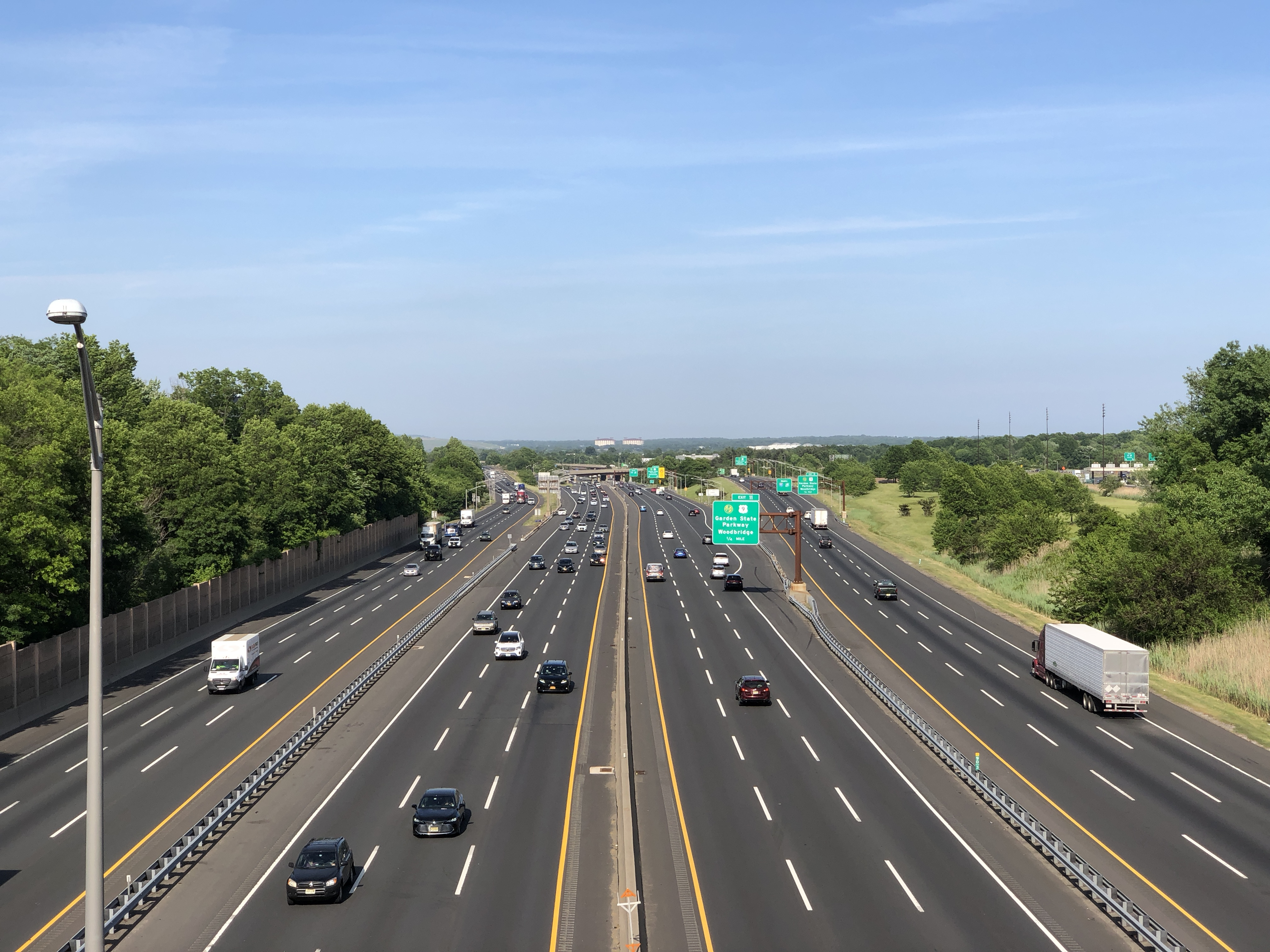
- The New Jersey Turnpike (Interstate 95) in Woodbridge Township, near its intersection with the Garden State Parkway

- Seal
- Motto: The Best Town Around
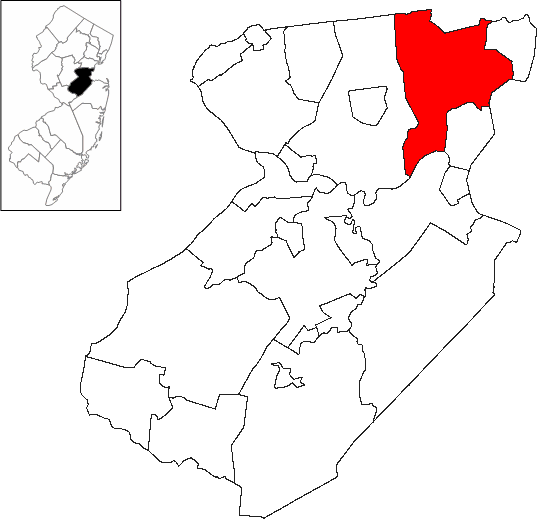
- Location of Woodbridge Township in Middlesex County highlighted in red (right). Inset map: Location of Middlesex County in New Jersey highlighted in black (left).

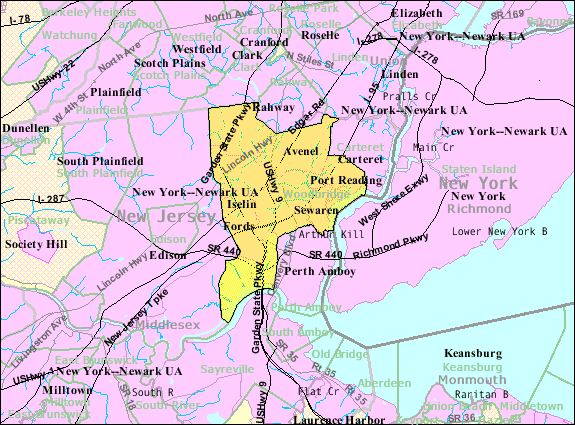
- Census Bureau map of Woodbridge Township, New Jersey
- Interactive map of Woodbridge Township, New Jersey
- Location in Middlesex County Location in New Jersey Location in the United States
- Coordinates: 40.56°N 74.29°W
- Country: United States
- State: New Jersey
- County: Middlesex
- Settled: 1664
- Chartered: June 1, 1669
- Incorporated: February 21, 1798
- Named for: John W. Woodbridge

Government
  - Type: Faulkner Act (mayor–council)
  - Body: Township Council
  - Mayor: John McCormac (D, term ends December 31, 2027)
  - Administrator: Vito Cimilluca
  - Municipal clerk: John M. Mitch

Area
  - Total: 24.61 sq mi (63.74 km^{2})
  - Land: 23.26 sq mi (60.24 km^{2})
  - Water: 1.35 sq mi (3.50 km^{2}) 5.50%
  - Rank: 110th of 565 in state 5th of 25 in county
- Elevation: 59 ft (18 m)

Population (2020)
  - Total: 103,639
  - Estimate (2023): 103,194
  - Rank: 7th of 565 in state 2nd of 25 in county
  - Density: 4,456.1/sq mi (1,720.5/km^{2})
  - Rank: 137th of 565 in state 11th of 25 in county
- Time zone: UTC−05:00 (Eastern (EST))
  - Summer (DST): UTC−04:00 (Eastern (EDT))
- ZIP Codes: 07095 – Woodbridge; 07001 – Avenel; 07064 – Port Reading; 07067 – Colonia; 07077 – Sewaren; 07095 – Woodbridge; 08830 – Iselin; 08832 – Keasbey; 08840 – Menlo Park Terrace; 08861 – Hopelawn; 08863 – Fords
- Area code: 732
- FIPS code: 34-82000
- GNIS ID: 882165
- Website: www.twp.woodbridge.nj.us

Woodbridge Township is a township in northern Middlesex County, in the U.S. state of New Jersey. The township is a regional hub of transportation and commerce for central New Jersey and a major bedroom suburb of New York City, within the New York metropolitan area. Located within the core of the Raritan Valley region, Woodbridge Township hosts the junction of the New Jersey Turnpike and the Garden State Parkway, the two busiest highways in the state, and also serves as the headquarters for the New Jersey Turnpike Authority, which operates both highways.

As of the 2020 United States census, the township was the state's seventh-most-populous municipality, with a population of 103,639, its highest decennial count ever and an increase of 4,054 (+4.1%) from the 99,585 recorded at the 2010 census, which in turn reflected an increase of 2,382 (+2.5%) from the 97,203 counted in the 2000 census. Woodbridge was the state's sixth-largest by population in 2000 and 2010.

== History ==
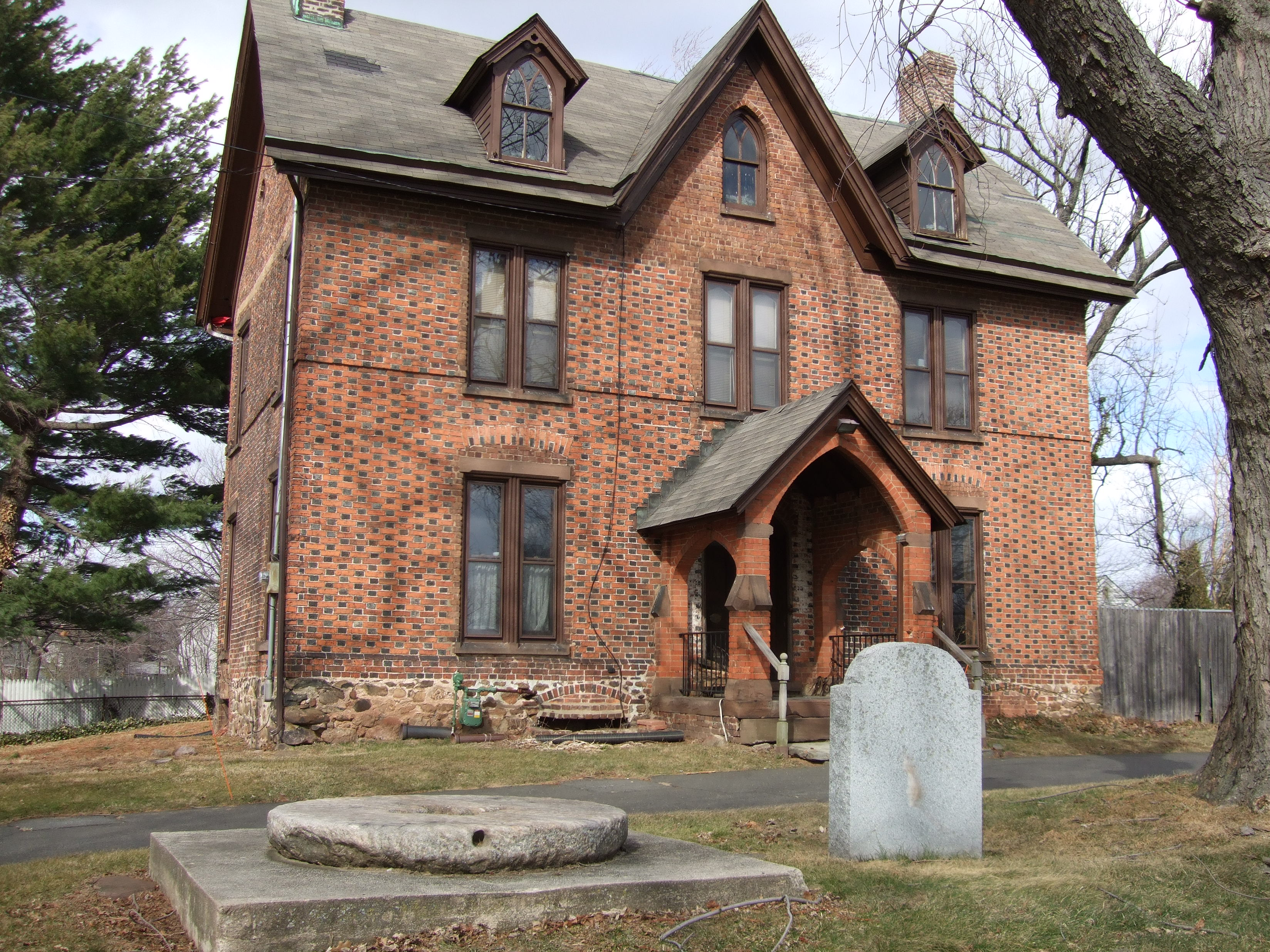
The Jonathan Singletary Dunham House, built in 1709

According to historian Joshua Coffin, the community's early settlers included: Captain John Pike, the ancestor of General Zebulon Montgomery Pike, who was killed at the battle of Queenstown in 1813; Thomas Bloomfield, the ancestor of Joseph Bloomfield, some years governor of New Jersey, for whom the township of Bloomfield is named; John Bishop, senior and junior; Jonathan Haynes; Henry Jaques; George March; Stephen Kent; Abraham Toppan, junior; Elisha Ilsley; Hugh March; John Bloomfield; Samuel Moore; Nathaniel Webster; John Ilsley; and others." Woodbridge was the site of the first gristmill in New Jersey. The mill was built by Jonathan Singletary Dunham, who was married to Mary Bloomfield, relative of Joseph Bloomfield.

Woodbridge Township is the oldest original township in New Jersey and was granted a royal charter on June 1, 1669, by King Charles II of England. It was reincorporated on October 31, 1693. Woodbridge Township was incorporated by the Township Act of 1798 of the New Jersey Legislature on February 21, 1798, as one of the initial 104 townships incorporated in the state under the Township Act. Portions of the township were taken to form Rahway (April 19, 1858), Raritan Township (March 17, 1870, now Edison Township) and Roosevelt (April 11, 1906, now Carteret). The township is named after Reverend John W. Woodbridge (1613–1696) of Newbury, Massachusetts, who settled in the future township in 1664.

Woodbridge was the site of one of America's deadliest rail accidents on February 6, 1951, when a crowded commuter train derailed with 85 deaths. The victims are memorialized by a pair of historical markers, installed by New Jersey Transit in 2002 and by Woodbridge Township in 2013.

In October 1982, Woodbridge made national news when, for the first time in the United States, local authorities enacted a now-repealed measure under which people were banned from using the then-popular Sony Walkman cassette players in public, while riding a bike, crossing the street, or driving a car. Violators were to be fined $50 and could have spent up to 15 days in jail. In April 2022, this law was repealed in its entirety by township ordinance.

== Geography ==
According to the U.S. Census Bureau, the township had a total area of 24.61 square miles (63.74 km^{2}), including 23.26 square miles (60.24 km^{2}) of land and 1.35 square miles (3.50 km^{2}) of water (5.50%).

The township borders Carteret, Edison, Perth Amboy and Sayreville in Middlesex County; Clark, Linden and Rahway in Union County. Its border with the borough of Staten Island in New York City is in the Arthur Kill.

Area codes 732 and 848 are used in Woodbridge.

Pumpkin Patch Brook, which flows through Woodbridge, is a tributary of the Robinson's Branch of the Rahway River, which feeds the Robinson's Branch Reservoir.

=== Climate ===
The township has a borderline humid subtropical climate (Cfa) similar to most of metropolitan New Jersey. The local hardiness zone is 7a.

=== Communities ===
There are distinct communities within Woodbridge Township. Several of these communities have their own ZIP Codes, and many are listed by the United States Census Bureau as census-designated places (CDPs), but they are all unincorporated communities and neighborhoods within the Township that, together, make up Woodbridge Township.

Avenel (with 2020 Census population of 16,290), Colonia (18,609), Fords (12,941), Hopelawn (2,603), Iselin (20,088), Keasbey (3,027), Menlo Park Terrace (2,806), Port Reading (3,921), Sewaren (2,885), Woodbridge or Woodbridge Proper (19,839) are census-designated places and unincorporated communities located within Woodbridge Township.

Other unincorporated communities, localities and place names located partially or completely within the township include: Boynton Beach, Demarest Hill Top, Edgars, Fairfield, Hazelton, Lynn Woodoaks, Ostrander, Saint Stephens, Sand Hills, Shore View, Union, and Woodbridge Oaks.

== Demographics ==
Historical population
Census	Pop.	Note	%±
1790	3,520		—
1810	4,247		—
1820	4,226		−0.5%
1830	3,969		−6.1%
1840	4,821		21.5%
1850	5,141		6.6%
1860	3,987	*	−22.4%
1870	3,717	*	−6.8%
1880	4,099		10.3%
1890	4,665		13.8%
1900	7,631		63.6%
1910	8,948	*	17.3%
1920	13,423		50.0%
1930	25,266		88.2%
1940	27,191		7.6%
1950	35,758		31.5%
1960	78,846		120.5%
1970	98,944		25.5%
1980	90,074		−9.0%
1990	93,086		3.3%
2000	97,203		4.4%
2010	99,585		2.5%
2020	103,639		4.1%
2023 (est.)	103,194	▼	−0.4%
Population sources: 1790-1920; 1810-1930 1840 1850-1870; 1850 1870 1880-1890; 1890-1910 1910-1930; 1940–2000 2000; 2010 2020 * = Lost territory since previous census.

=== 2020 census ===
Woodbridge Township, New Jersey – Racial and ethnic composition Note: the US Census treats Hispanic/Latino as an ethnic category. This table excludes Latinos from the racial categories and assigns them to a separate category. Hispanics/Latinos may be of any race.
Race / Ethnicity (NH = Non-Hispanic)	Pop 1990	Pop 2000	Pop 2010	Pop 2020	% 1990	% 2000	% 2010	% 2020
White alone (NH)	77,079	63,999	50,531	40,272	82.80%	65.84%	50.74%	38.86%
Black or African American alone (NH)	5,645	8,154	9,038	10,143	6.06%	8.39%	9.08%	9.79%
Native American or Alaska Native alone (NH)	103	97	200	165	0.11%	0.10%	0.20%	0.16%
Asian alone (NH)	4,995	14,007	22,193	27,425	5.37%	14.41%	22.29%	26.46%
Pacific Islander alone (NH)	N/A	18	16	24	N/A	0.02%	0.02%	0.02%
Other race alone (NH)	84	253	290	757	0.09%	0.26%	0.29%	0.73%
Mixed race or Multiracial (NH)	N/A	1,719	1,755	2,574	N/A	1.77%	1.76%	2.48%
Hispanic or Latino (any race)	5,180	8,956	15,562	22,279	5.56%	9.21%	15.63%	21.50%
Total	93,086	97,203	99,585	103,639	100.00%	100.00%	100.00%	100.00%

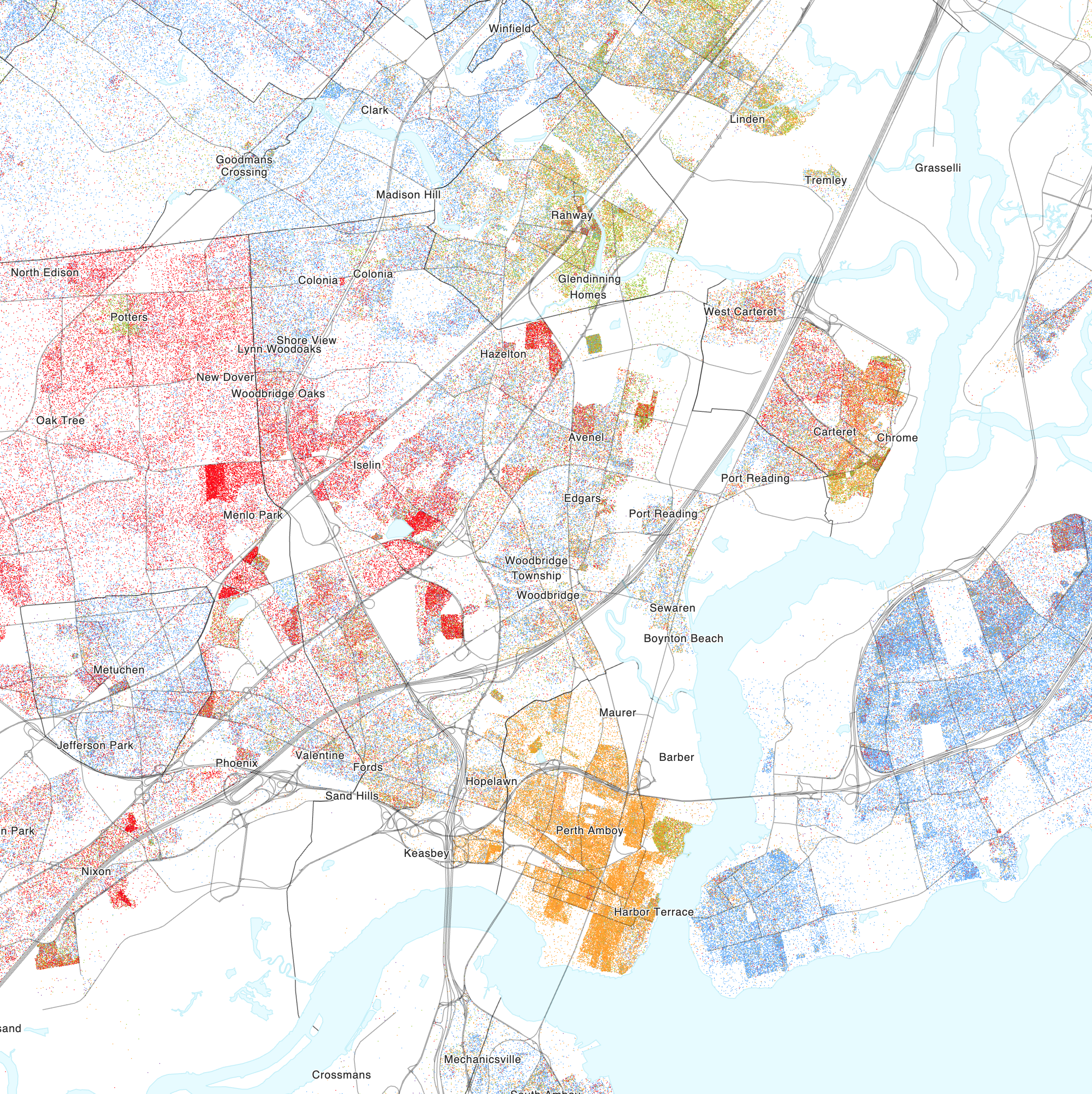
Map of racial distribution in Woodbridge, 2020 U.S. census. Each dot is one person: ⬤ White ⬤ Black ⬤ Asian ⬤ Hispanic ⬤ Multiracial ⬤ Native American/Other

=== 2010 census ===
The 2010 United States census counted 99,585 people, 34,615 households, and 25,754 families in the township. The population density was 4,290.0 per square mile (1,656.4/km^{2}). There were 36,124 housing units at an average density of 1,556.2 per square mile (600.9/km^{2}). The racial makeup was 59.18% (58,935) White, 9.85% (9,810) Black or African American, 0.32% (321) Native American, 22.42% (22,324) Asian, 0.04% (39) Pacific Islander, 5.28% (5,254) from other races, and 2.91% (2,902) from two or more races. Hispanic or Latino of any race were 15.63% (15,562) of the population.

Of the 34,615 households, 33.6% had children under the age of 18; 57.2% were married couples living together; 12.4% had a female householder with no husband present and 25.6% were non-families. Of all households, 21.4% were made up of individuals and 9.0% had someone living alone who was 65 years of age or older. The average household size was 2.79 and the average family size was 3.27.

21.6% of the population were under the age of 18, 7.9% from 18 to 24, 29.7% from 25 to 44, 28.1% from 45 to 64, and 12.6% who were 65 years of age or older. The median age was 38.6 years. For every 100 females, the population had 98.9 males. For every 100 females ages 18 and older there were 98.0 males.

The Census Bureau's 2006–2010 American Community Survey showed that (in 2010 inflation-adjusted dollars) median household income was $79,277 (with a margin of error of +/− $2,537) and the median family income was $88,656 (+/− $2,537). Males had a median income of $60,139 (+/− $1,971) versus $46,078 (+/− $1,635) for females. The per capita income for the township was $32,144 (+/− $717). About 3.8% of families and 5.0% of the population were below the poverty line, including 6.9% of those under age 18 and 6.6% of those age 65 or over.

=== 2000 census ===
As of the 2000 United States census, there were 97,203 people, 34,562 households, and 25,437 families residing in the township. The population density was 4,224.5 inhabitants per square mile (1,631.1/km^{2}). There were 35,298 housing units at an average density of 1,534.1 per square mile (592.3/km^{2}). The racial makeup of the township was 70.83% White, 8.75% African American, 0.17% Native American, 14.46% Asian, 0.02% Pacific Islander, 3.30% from other races, and 2.46% from two or more races. Hispanic or Latino of any race were 9.21% of the population.

As of the 2000 Census, 9.19% of Woodbridge Township's residents identified themselves as being of Indian American ancestry, which was the tenth-highest of any municipality in the United States and the fifth highest in New Jersey—behind Edison (17.75%), Plainsboro Township (16.97%), Piscataway Township (12.49%) and South Brunswick Township (10.48%)—of all places with 1,000 or more residents identifying their ancestry.

There were 34,562 households, out of which 33.0% had children under the age of 18 living with them, 58.1% were married couples living together, 11.4% had a female householder with no husband present, and 26.4% were non-families. 21.7% of all households were made up of individuals, and 9.0% had someone living alone who was 65 years of age or older. The average household size was 2.71 and the average family size was 3.19. In the township, the population was spread out, with 22.4% under the age of 18, 7.1% from 18 to 24, 34.8% from 25 to 44, 22.3% from 45 to 64, and 13.4% who were 65 years of age or older. The median age was 37 years. For every 100 females, there were 100.2 males. For every 100 females age 18 and over, there were 99.0 males.

The median income for a household in the township was $60,683, and the median income for a family was $68,492. Males had a median income of $49,248 versus $35,096 for females. The per capita income for the township was $25,087. About 3.2% of families and 4.8% of the population were below the poverty line, including 4.7% of those under age 18 and 5.3% of those age 65 or over.

== Economy ==
Woodbridge Center, with a gross leasable area of 1,633,000 square feet (151,700 m^{2}), is the fourth-biggest mall in New Jersey.

Wakefern Food Corporation, owner of ShopRite, has its headquarters in Keasbey in the township. Additionally, the township is one of a handful in New Jersey that have authorized the sale of medical cannabis through local dispensaries.

== Parks and recreation ==
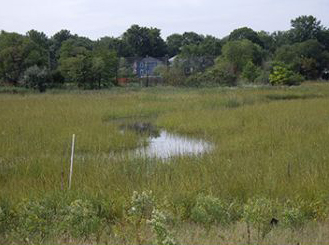
Woodbridge River in Woodbridge Township, 2008

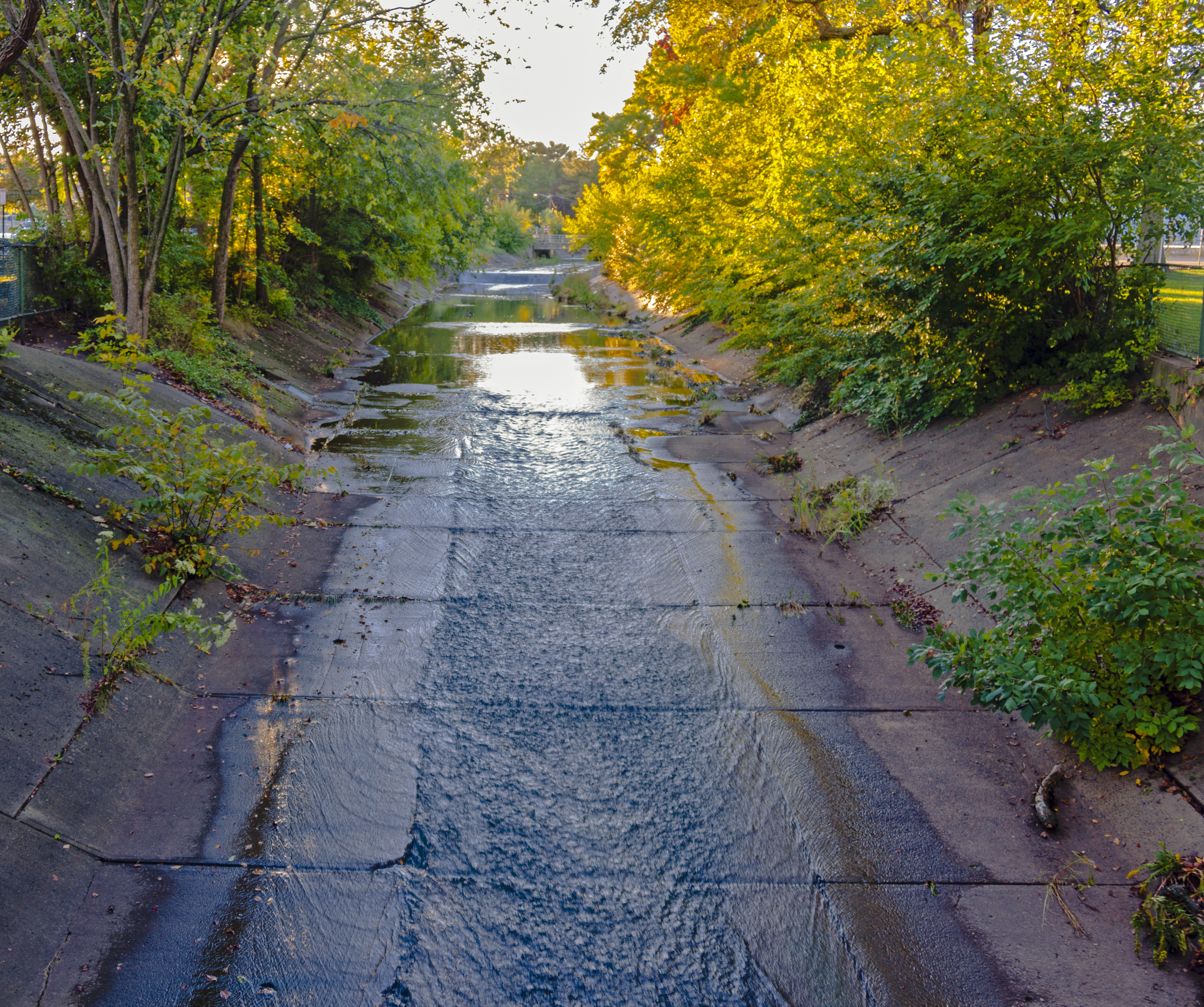
Heards Brook in Woodbridge Township

In the center of Woodbridge Heards Brook passes through Heards Brook Park. Described as "the most preferred tourist attraction in Woodbridge," it has a wooded area, picnic tables, tree-lined stone pathways, basketball courts and "stunning views of the brook." The Rutgers University floodplain plan is to integrate smaller areas of park land in the eastern portion of Heards Brook into the larger area of open spaces with a bioswale.

In 2013, the Ernest L. Oros Wildlife Preserve was dedicated; the Preserve occupies 67 acres (27 ha) along the Woodbridge River and has restored the river and adjacent land as a nature preserve. Activities include hiking, boating, bird watching, and picnicking. Many bird species have been observed along the river, particularly at the Oros Preserve. Bird sightings include wading birds (great blue herons and great egrets), the bald eagle, belted kingfishers and Canada goose. Eight mammal species have been noted, including raccoon and red fox; nine fish species have been identified, including the American eel. The Preserve has been called "an important hot spot in an otherwise highly developed area." Within the preserve is the Butterfly Garden. Downstream and north of Port Reading Avenue is Woodbridge River Park. It covers 40 acres (16 ha), and has been described as "loaded with channels, backwaters, oxbows and suitable for canoes."

The Middlesex Greenway is a 3.5-mile (5.6 km) long rail trail, a former Lehigh Valley Railroad rail line between Metuchen and Woodbridge. It makes up a portion of the East Coast Greenway.

Merrill Park is a 179 acres (72 ha) park along the banks of the South Branch Rahway River, fully renovated in 2013. It has sports facilities, playgrounds, bike paths and walkways.

James Parker founded the first printing press in New Jersey in 1751; his building has been restored with an old working printing press. The printing business made Woodbridge an early center of publishing. It is located in Parker Press Park, Woodbridge Proper; the park has concert series in the summer.

Woodbridge Community Center has a gym, miniature golf course, batting cages, a pool, community rooms, a playground, and also has "The Arenas", which have a roller skating rink with arcade and an ice skating rink.

Joseph Medwick Park is a Middlesex County Park, shared with Carteret, along banks of the Rahway River. It is part of the Rahway River Greenway Plan.

== Government ==
=== Local government ===
Woodbridge is governed within the Faulkner Act, formally known as the Optional Municipal Charter law, under the Mayor-Council system of municipal government. The township is one of 71 municipalities (of the 564) statewide that use this form of government. The governing body is comprised of a directly elected mayor and a nine-member Township Council, with all officials elected to staggered four-year terms of office on a partisan basis as part of the November general election in odd-numbered years. The council includes four members elected at-large and five members elected from each of the township's five wards. The at-large and mayoral seats come up together for vote followed two years later by the five ward seats.

As of 2024, the Mayor of Woodbridge Township is Democrat John McCormac, whose term of office ends December 31, 2023. McCormac was first elected on November 7, 2006, and sworn in on November 14, 2006. McCormac replaced Frank G. Pelzman, who became mayor on January 17, 2002, when former mayor James E. McGreevey resigned to become governor. Members of the Township Council are Council President Kyle M. Anderson (D, 2027; at-large), Council Vice President Cory S. Spillar (D, 2025; Third Ward), Harold R. "Howie" Bauer Jr. (D, 2025; Second Ward), Lizbeth DeJesus (D, 2027; at-large), Gregg M. Ficarra (D, 2027; at-large), Sharon McAuliffe (D, 2025; First Ward - elected to serve an unexpired term), Debbie Meehan (D, 2025; Fifth Ward), Virbhadra N. "Viru" Patel (D, 2025; Fourth Ward) and Brian F. Small (D, 2027; at-large).

In January 2022, the Township Council selected Sharon McAuliffe from a list of three candidates submitted by the Democratic municipal committee to fill the First Ward seat expiring in December 2025 that had been held by Nancy Bader-Drumm for a decade until her death earlier that month. McAuliffe served on an interim basis until the November 2022 general election, when she was elected to serve the balance of the term of office.

In August 2015, the Township Council selected Cory Spillar from a list of three candidates nominated by the Democratic municipal committee to fill the Third Ward seat that had been held by Council President Michele Charmello until her resignation the previous month to take a position in Pittsburgh. The council chose new leadership, promoting Nancy Drumm from vice president to president (to replace Charmello) and Rick Dalina as vice president.

=== Federal, state, and county representation ===
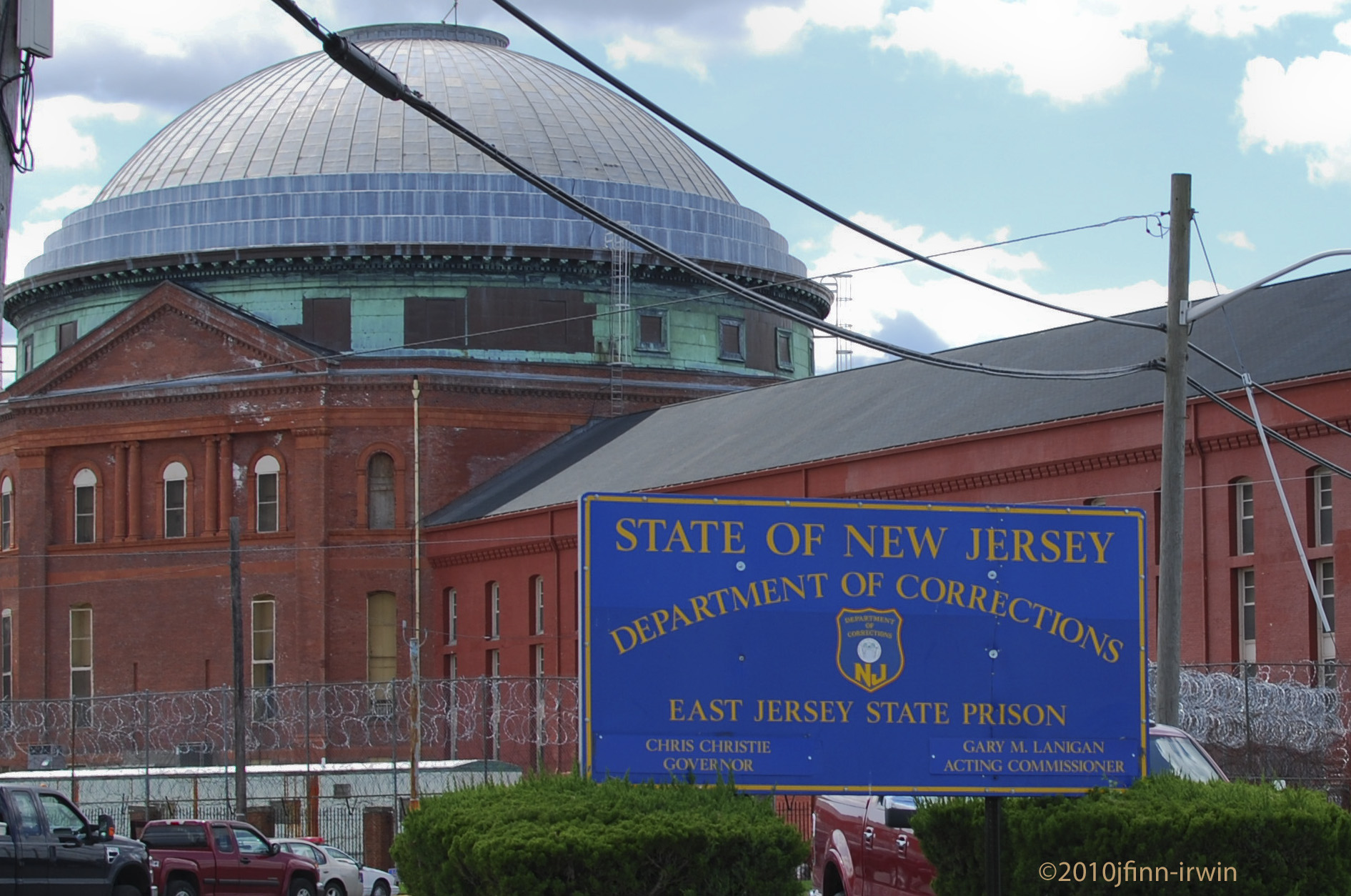
East Jersey State Prison

Woodbridge Township is located in the 6th Congressional District and is part of New Jersey's 19th state legislative district.

For the 119th United States Congress, New Jersey's 6th congressional district is represented by Frank Pallone (D, Long Branch). New Jersey is represented in the United States Senate by Democrats Cory Booker (Newark, term ends 2027) and Andy Kim (Moorestown, term ends 2031).

For the 2026–2027 session, the 19th legislative district of the New Jersey Legislature is represented in the State Senate by Joe F. Vitale (D, Woodbridge Township) and in the General Assembly by Craig Coughlin (D, Woodbridge Township) and Yvonne Lopez (D, Perth Amboy).

Middlesex County is governed by a Board of County Commissioners, whose seven members are elected at-large on a partisan basis to serve three-year terms of office on a staggered basis, with either two or three seats coming up for election each year as part of the November general election. At an annual reorganization meeting held in January, the board selects from among its members a commissioner director and deputy director. As of 2025, Middlesex County's Commissioners (with party affiliation, term-end year, and residence listed in parentheses) are:

Director Ronald G. Rios (D, Carteret, 2027), Deputy Director Shanti Narra (D, North Brunswick, 2027), Claribel A. "Clary" Azcona-Barber (D, New Brunswick, 2025), Charles Kenny (D, Woodbridge Township, 2025), Leslie Koppel (D, Monroe Township, 2026), Chanelle Scott McCullum (D, Piscataway, 2025) and Charles E. Tomaro (D, Edison, 2026).

Constitutional officers are: Clerk Nancy Pinkin (D, 2025, East Brunswick), Sheriff Mildred S. Scott (D, 2025, Piscataway) and Surrogate Claribel Cortes (D, 2026; North Brunswick).

=== Politics ===
As of March 2011, there were a total of 54,674 registered voters in Woodbridge Township, of which 20,900 (38.2%) were registered as Democrats, 6,135 (11.2%) were registered as Republicans and 27,611 (50.5%) were registered as Unaffiliated. There were 28 voters registered to other parties.

United States presidential election results for Woodbridge Township
Year	Republican		Democratic		Third party(ies)	
Year	No.	%	No.	%	No.	%
2024	21,531	47.95%	22,175	49.38%	1,201	2.67%
2020	18,760	41.62%	25,778	57.20%	532	1.18%
2016	16,055	41.40%	21,533	55.53%	1,192	3.07%
2012	13,200	36.70%	22,386	62.23%	386	1.07%
2008	16,251	42.42%	21,590	56.35%	472	1.23%
2004	16,589	45.30%	19,662	53.69%	367	1.00%
2000	12,184	37.17%	19,357	59.05%	1,240	3.78%

In the 2012 presidential election, Democrat Barack Obama received 62.2% of the vote (22,386 cast), ahead of Republican Mitt Romney with 36.7% (13,200 votes), and other candidates with 1.1% (386 votes), among the 36,301 ballots cast by the township's 55,262 registered voters (329 ballots were spoiled), for a turnout of 65.7%. In the 2008 presidential election, Democrat Barack Obama received 55.9% of the vote (21,590 cast), ahead of Republican John McCain with 42.0% (16,251 votes) and other candidates with 1.2% (472 votes), among the 38,657 ballots cast by the township's 55,075 registered voters, for a turnout of 70.2%. In the 2004 presidential election, Democrat John Kerry received 53.5% of the vote (19,662 ballots cast), outpolling Republican George W. Bush with 45.1% (16,589 votes) and other candidates with 0.7% (367 votes), among the 36,770 ballots cast by the township's 51,913 registered voters, for a turnout percentage of 70.8.

Gubernatorial election results for Woodbridge Township
Year	Republican		Democratic		Third party(ies)	
Year	No.	%	No.	%	No.	%
2025	12,681	37.86%	20,601	61.50%	216	0.64%
2021	11,292	46.96%	12,510	52.03%	244	1.01%
2017	8,292	40.75%	11,530	56.66%	526	2.59%
2013	12,122	59.16%	8,183	39.93%	186	0.91%
2009	11,987	49.97%	10,029	41.81%	1,971	8.22%
2005	9,348	39.49%	13,077	55.24%	1,247	5.27%

In the 2013 gubernatorial election, Republican Chris Christie received 58.9% of the vote (12,122 cast), ahead of Democrat Barbara Buono with 39.7% (8,183 votes), and other candidates with 1.4% (286 votes), among the 21,064 ballots cast by the township's 56,121 registered voters (473 ballots were spoiled), for a turnout of 37.5%. In the 2009 gubernatorial election, Republican Chris Christie received 50.1% of the vote (11,987 ballots cast), ahead of Democrat Jon Corzine with 41.9% (10,029 votes), Independent Chris Daggett with 7.2% (1,710 votes) and other candidates with 1.1% (261 votes), among the 23,913 ballots cast by the township's 53,843 registered voters, yielding a 44.4% turnout.

United States Senate election results for Woodbridge1
Year	Republican		Democratic		Third party(ies)	
Year	No.	%	No.	%	No.	%
2024	18,033	43.52%	21,697	52.36%	1,709	4.12%
2018	11,725	40.75%	16,081	55.89%	968	3.36%
2012	11,586	34.84%	20,987	63.11%	680	2.04%
2006	8,880	40.19%	12,332	55.82%	881	3.99%

United States Senate election results for Woodbridge2
Year	Republican		Democratic		Third party(ies)	
Year	No.	%	No.	%	No.	%
2020	17,051	38.80%	25,778	58.65%	1,121	2.55%
2014	5,951	38.97%	9,024	59.10%	295	1.93%
2013	5,577	44.64%	6,785	54.31%	130	1.04%
2008	13,726	39.31%	20,222	57.91%	971	2.78%

== Education ==
The Woodbridge Township School District serves students in pre-kindergarten through twelfth grade. All schools in the district are accredited by the Middle States Association of Colleges and Schools Commission on Elementary and Secondary Schools. The district's three standard high schools offer more than 150 courses, including Advanced Placement, college preparatory, business, vocational and cooperative work/study programs. As of the 2022–23 school year, the district, comprised of 25 schools, had an enrollment of 13,836 students and 1,193.7 classroom teachers (on an FTE basis), for a student–teacher ratio of 11.6:1. High schools in the district (with 2022–23 enrollment data from the National Center for Education Statistics) are Colonia High School with 1,356 students in grades 9-12, John F. Kennedy Memorial High School (1,371; 9-12), Reaching Individual Student Excellence (RISE) (NA; 9-12) and Woodbridge High School (1,558; 9-12).

Eighth grade students from all of Middlesex County are eligible to apply to attend the high school programs offered by the Middlesex County Magnet Schools, a county-wide vocational school district that offers full-time career and technical education at its schools in East Brunswick, Edison, Perth Amboy, Piscataway and Woodbridge Township, with no tuition charged to students for attendance.

== Transportation ==
=== Roads and highways ===
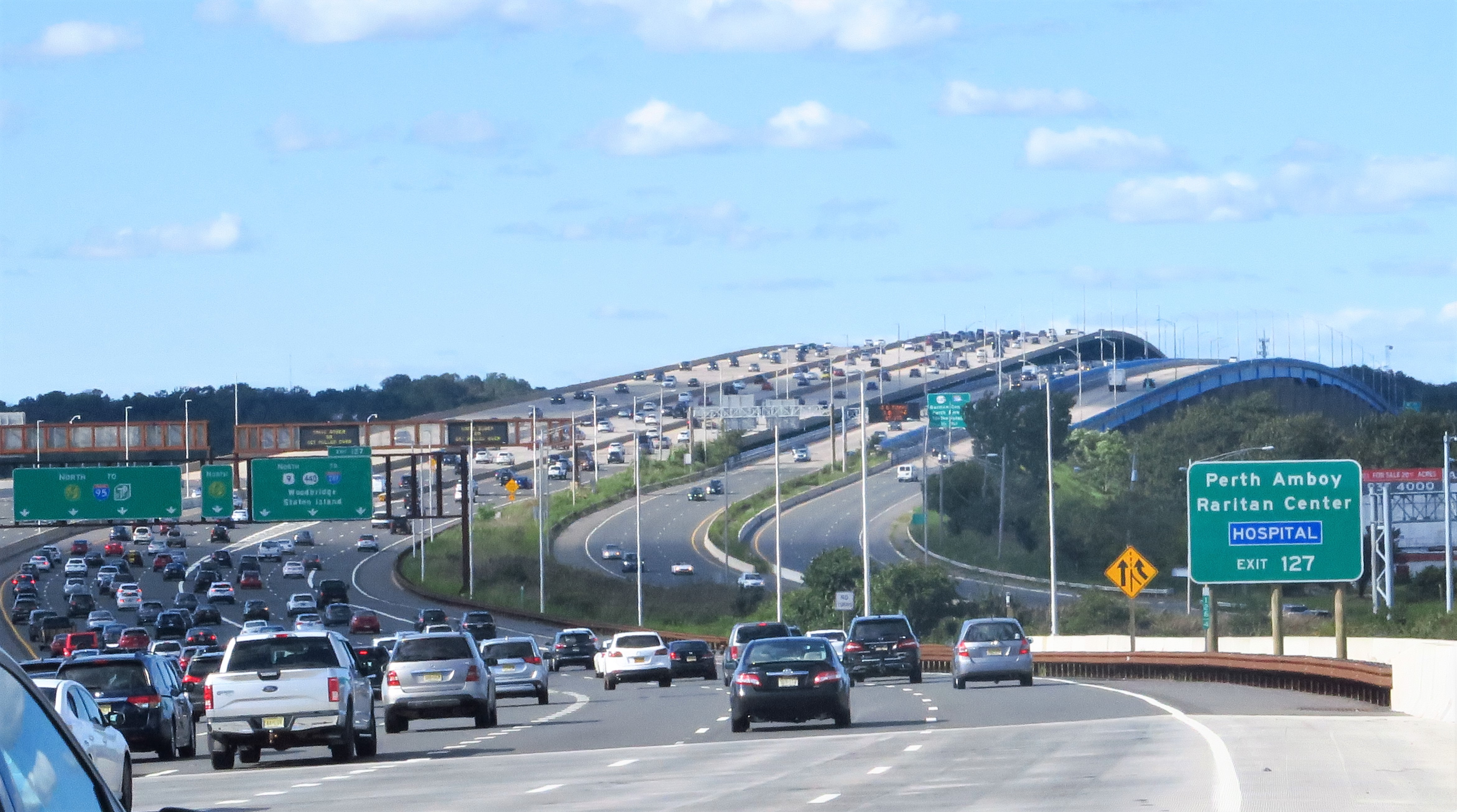
The Governor Alfred E. Driscoll Bridge on the Garden State Parkway, crosses the Raritan River connecting Woodbridge to Sayreville; with a total of 15 travel lanes and six shoulder lanes, is one of the world's widest and busiest motor vehicle bridges

As of May 2010, the township had a total of 303.32 miles (488.15 km) of roadways, of which 244.16 miles (392.94 km) were maintained by the municipality, 28.79 miles (46.33 km) by Middlesex County, 17.69 miles (28.47 km) by the New Jersey Department of Transportation and 12.68 miles (20.41 km) by the New Jersey Turnpike Authority.

The Garden State Parkway extends 7 1/2 miles (12.1 km) through the Township, including exits 127 to 132. The Parkway connects Sayreville in the south to Clark in the north. In addition, the New Jersey Turnpike (Interstate 95) passes through Woodbridge Township for about 5 1/4 miles (8.4 km), and is accessible at Exit 11 (which features a 24-lane toll gate). The Turnpike's Grover Cleveland Service Area is located between Interchanges 11 and 12 northbound at milepost 92.9 and the Thomas Edison Service Area is between Interchanges 11 and 12 southbound at milepost 92.9.

U.S. Route 1 and U.S. Route 9 serve the township and merge heading north of the township as the U.S. Route 1/9 concurrency. Other roadways passing through the township are Route 27, Route 35, Route 184 and Route 440.

The 15-lane Driscoll Bridge on the Garden State Parkway and the adjacent 6-lane Edison Bridge on U.S. Route 9 both span the Raritan River, connecting Woodbridge Township on the north with Sayreville on the south.

The first cloverleaf interchange in the world, the Woodbridge Cloverleaf, opened in 1929 at the intersection of Route 25 (since renamed as U.S. Route 1/9) and Route 4 (now Route 35).

=== Public transportation ===
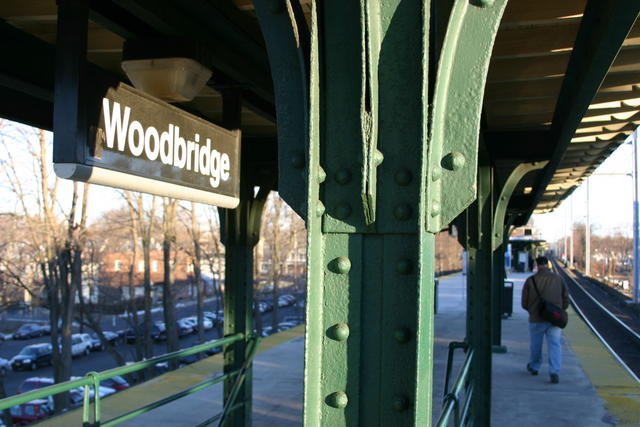
Woodbridge station (New Jersey Transit)

There are three train stations in the township: Metropark, Avenel, and Woodbridge. Service is provided at Metropark by NJ Transit's Northeast Corridor Line and at Avenel and Woodbridge on the North Jersey Coast Line.

The Metropark station had 3,702 average weekday boardings in 2025, the seventh-highest of any NJ Transit station in the state. The Metropark station also offers Amtrak Northeast Corridor services to Newark Penn Station, New York Penn Station, Philadelphia, Washington, D.C., and Boston. In September 2019, NJ Transit initiated increased daily service at the Avenel station and announced the resumption of weekend service after more than 20 years.

NJ Transit provides bus service on the 115 and 116 routes to the Port Authority Bus Terminal in Midtown Manhattan, on the 48 to Elizabeth and local service on the 801, 802, 803, 804, 805, 810, 813 and 815.

== Woodbridge floodplain ==
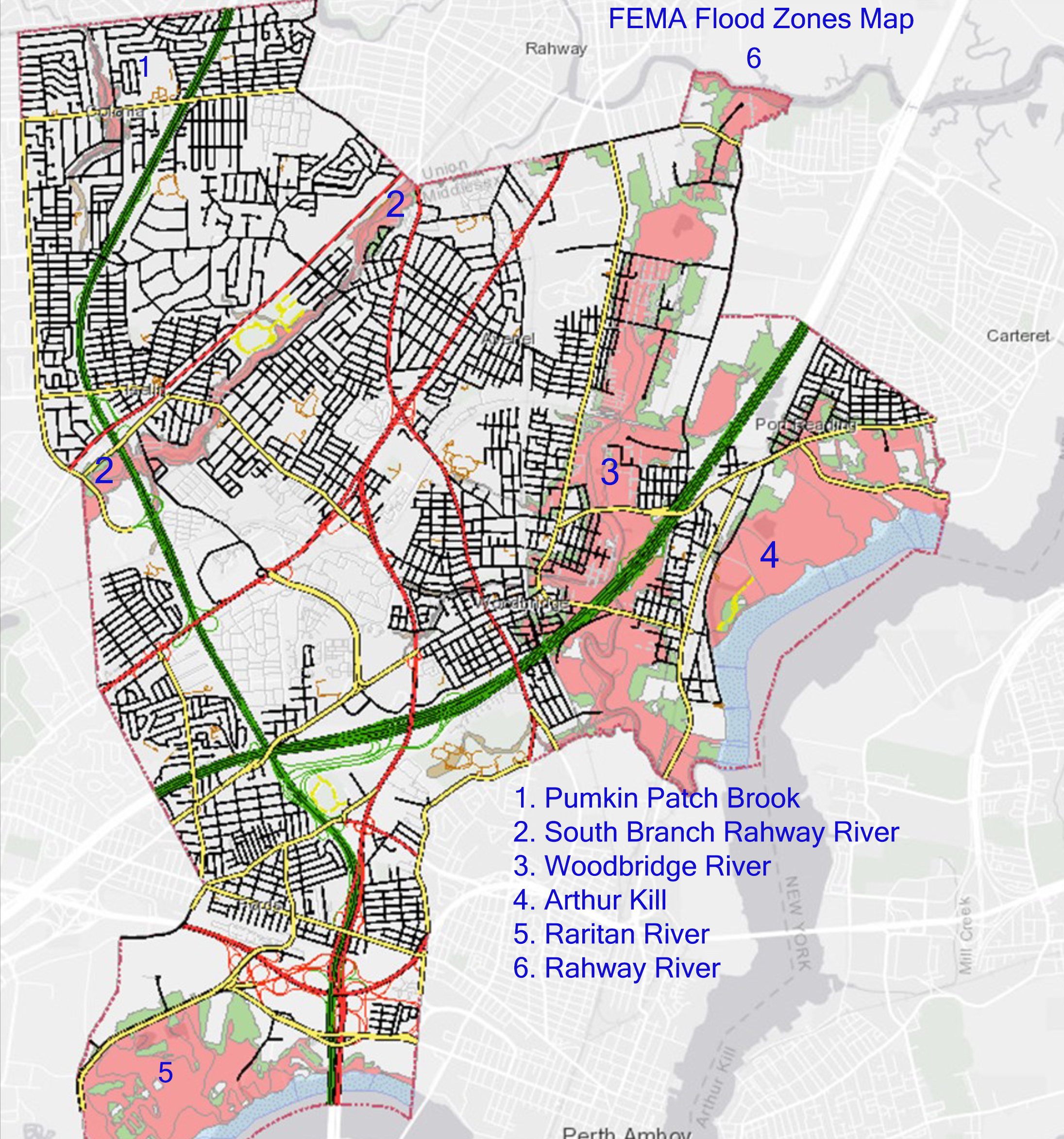
Flood hazard zones in Woodbridge Township

Woodbridge's geographical features make it prone to repeated flooding. It is surrounded by water on three sides: the Arthur Kill, a tidal strait to the east, and tidal rivers to the south, Raritan River, and north, Rahway River; and, much of the developed land in Woodbridge has low elevations, as little as five feet above sea level. About 19% of Woodbridge Township lies within FEMA's flood hazard areas. There is a long history of tidal flooding along the Woodbridge River in Woodbridge Proper, the Raritan in Keasbey and the Arthur Kill in Sewaren and Port Reading. In addition to tidal flooding, fluvial flooding is common. Woodbridge streams and rivers have been described as having a "high flow, flashy nature." The land is relatively impervious, and flooding is exacerbated by steep slopes and urban cover. Flooding in the South Branch Rahway River and Pumpkin Patch Brook hazard zones is predominantly fluvial. Prolonged coastal storms (nor'easters), which combine tidal and fluvial flooding, along with flow constrictions, cause an increase in the duration of flooding of the Woodbridge River and its tributaries, Heards Brook and Wedgewood Brook, which may last for days before water levels subside. Frequency of flooding has increased over time. Sea levels are rising and residential areas have moved into previous marsh land, decreasing the ability of the land to absorb excess water. A 1770 map shows that all land surrounding the Woodbridge River was salt marshes. I

=== Hurricane Sandy ===
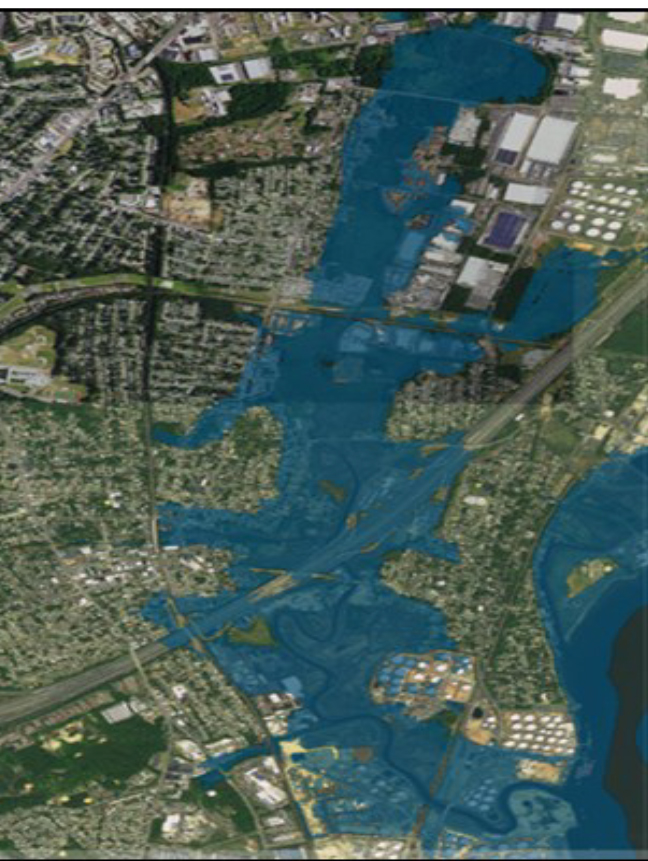
Woodbridge area inundated by Woodbridge River after Hurricane Sandy

In October 2012, New Jersey was devastated by Hurricane Sandy and Woodbridge suffered significant flood damage. One of the most affected neighborhoods from Hurricane Sandy was Watson-Crampton, an area adjacent to the Woodbridge River; prior to 2009 this area was zoned for high density residential housing, including an area of wetlands and meadows. When Sandy arrived in the area, it was "characterized as a tsunami-like water wall," destroying adjoining homes. After Sandy, using money from the New Jersey Buyout Program, Woodbridge began buying out and demolishing many residential properties in the flood hazard areas.

The plan is to restore the Woodbridge flood zones to their original riparian environment. Woodbridge's actions and plans have been called a "slow motion evacuation from climate change." As people move out of flood hazard areas, they will be replaced by a "floodplain forest of native trees, shrubs and grass," to help absorb water from rising sea levels. Despite predictions that flooding will worsen in coming decades as a result of rising sea levels, some property owners have been unwilling to sell, in large part because government programs incentivize these homeowners not to move because the financial risk is mitigated by "emergency" relief in the event of a flood.

== Points of interest ==
- The Jonathan Singletary Dunham House was built near the location of the earliest grist mill in New Jersey by Jonathan Singletary Dunham who was a Member of the New Jersey Provincial Congress.
- The Adult Diagnostic and Treatment Center is a correctional facility operated by the New Jersey Department of Corrections. The facility, located in the Avenel section of the Township, provides treatment to convicted sex offenders.
- East Jersey State Prison is a male prison facility in Woodbridge Township, on the border of Rahway. However, the mailing address is in Rahway and the facility was known until 1988 as Rahway State Prison, leading many to believe the facility was located there.
- J. J. Bitting Brewing Co., established in 1997, was the first brewery to operate in Woodbridge Township, New Jersey, since the repeal of prohibition in 1933. The three-story restaurant resides in a restored 100-year-old brick building that once housed the J. J. Bitting Coal and Feed Depot that serviced the farming community of Woodbridge.
- St. James Catholic Church, founded in 1860, has become one of the largest parishes in the Roman Catholic Diocese of Metuchen.

== Notable people ==
People who were born in, residents of, or otherwise closely associated with Woodbridge Township include:

- Antonio Alfano (born 2000), American football defensive tackle for the Edmonton Elks of the Canadian Football League
- Nels N. Alling (1861–1955), sculptor who specialized in terra cotta architectural work
- Chad Baker-Mazara (born 2000), college basketball player for the Auburn Tigers
- Nicholas L. Bissell (1947–1996), county prosecutor of Somerset County who committed suicide after being charged with embezzlement, tax fraud and abuse of power
- Joseph Bloomfield (1753–1823), 4th Governor of New Jersey was born in Woodbridge Township
- Percy Edgar Brown (1885–1937), soil scientist at Iowa State University, best known for the book, Soils of Iowa
- John Carlson (born 1990), professional ice hockey defenseman who has played in the NHL for the Washington Capitals
- Lance Carter (1955–2006), jazz drummer and percussionist
- Ralph Citarella (born 1958), former Major League Baseball pitcher who played for the St. Louis Cardinals and Chicago White Sox
- Craig Coughlin (born 1958), politician, who has served in the New Jersey General Assembly since 2010, where he represents the 19th Legislative District
- Lou Creekmur (1927–2009), left offensive tackle / guard who played in the NFL for the Detroit Lions and was inducted into the Pro Football Hall of Fame
- Clarence Madison Dally (1865–1904), glassblower and assistant to Thomas Edison
- Jordan Derkack, college basketball player for the Rutgers Scarlet Knights men's basketball team
- Tom DeSanto (born 1968), film producer and screenwriter best known for his work with long-time friend Bryan Singer, especially with his contributions to the first two X-Men movies
- Jonathan Singletary Dunham (1640–1724), Member of the New Jersey Provincial Congress
- Robbie E (born 1983), professional wrestler with Impact Wrestling on POP TV
- John J. Fay Jr. (1927–2003), member of the New Jersey General Assembly and the New Jersey Senate
- Arline Friscia (1934–2019), member of the New Jersey General Assembly who also served on the Woodbridge Township Council
- Najee Glass (born 1994), sprinter
- John Gorka (born 1958), folk musician
- Kelsey Grammer (born 1955), actor who appeared in Frasier and Cheers
- Bob Grant (1929–2013), radio host who broadcast many of his shows from the Reo Diner
- John A. Hall (1877–1919), collegiate football player who was head coach of the Carlisle Indians football team in 1898
- Dina Hashem (born 1989), stand-up comedian, voice actress and writer
- Tom Higgins (born 1954), NFL and Canadian football player and coach
- Edward M. Hundert, medical educator and academic administrator
- Jack H. Jacobs (born 1945), Medal of Honor recipient, awarded 1969
- Kyle Johnson (born 1978), fullback with the Denver Broncos from class of 1996
- Michael Jones (born 1987), actor, voice actor, and YouTube personality who works for Rooster Teeth
- Pat Lamberti (1937–2007), American football linebacker who played for the New York Titans and Denver Broncos in 1961
- Eric LeGrand (born 1990), football player, writer, actor, speaker
- Praise Martin-Oguike (born 1993), American football defensive end who played in the XFL for the Seattle Dragons
- Glen Mason (born 1950), former football player and coach who served as the head football coach at Kent State University from 1986 to 1987, the University of Kansas from 1988 to 1996, and the University of Minnesota from 1997 to 2006, compiling a career college football record of 123–121–1
- Laura McCullough (born 1960), poet
- John McCormac, former New Jersey Treasurer and Mayor of Woodbridge Township
- Jim McGreevey (born 1957), former Woodbridge mayor and Governor of New Jersey
- Melanie McGuire (born 1972), best known for being the perpetrator in the media-dubbed "suitcase murder" who was convicted of murdering her husband in April 2007 and sentenced to life in prison
- Stephen A. Mikulak, politician who served two terms in the New Jersey General Assembly, from 1992 to 1996, where he represented the 19th Legislative District
- Joseph Moore (1732–1793), Quaker peace negotiator sent to the 1793 talks between Native leaders of the Western Confederacy and American government representatives at Sandusky, Ohio
- Jazlyn Moya (born 1997), footballer who plays as a forward for United Women's Soccer club New Jersey Copa FC and the Dominican Republic women's national team
- Tim Mulqueen (born 1966), soccer goalkeeping coach and former goalkeeper who coached the US National Team at the 2008 Summer Olympics in Beijing
- Sydney P. Noe (1885–1969), numismatist, specializing in Greek coins, who was librarian, then curator, of the American Numismatic Society
- Ernest L. Oros (c. 1924–2012), member of the New Jersey General Assembly from 1992 to 1996
- James Parker (1714–1770), Colonial American printer and publisher who established the state's first permanent printing press in 1751 in Woodbridge
- Frank Pelzman (1934–2006), politician who served as mayor of Woodbridge Township
- Harding Peterson (1929–2019), professional baseball player and general manager
- John Pike (1613–1688/89), one of the founders and earliest settlers of Woodbridge Township
- Eleanor Platt (1910–1974), sculptor
- Dith Pran (1942–2008), photojournalist with The New York Times, human rights activist and survivor of the killing fields of Cambodia, whose life was portrayed in The Killing Fields
- Dory Previn (1925–2012), singer-songwriter
- Dawn Marie Psaltis (born 1970) a.k.a. Dawn Marie, professional wrestling personality
- Arthur A. Quinn (1866–1957), labor union leader and politician
- Zack Rosen (born 1989), All-American basketball player at Penn who plays professionally for Maccabi Ashdod in Israel
- Michele Ross (born 1982), neuroscientist and media personality
- Richie Sambora (born 1959), former guitarist of band Bon Jovi
- Tom Scharpling (born 1969), comedian, host of The Best Show and a writer/executive producer of the television series Monk
- Bret Schundler (born 1959), mayor of Jersey City, New Jersey
- Anthony Seratelli (born 1983), professional baseball second baseman who plays for the Saitama Seibu Lions of Nippon Professional Baseball
- Chris Smith (born 1953), U.S. Representative for New Jersey's 4th congressional district since 1981
- James Swann (born 1964), serial killer whose random drive-by shotgun shootings in Washington, D.C., in 1993 earned him the nickname "The Shotgun Stalker" in the press
- Norman Tanzman (1918–2004), philanthropist who served in the New Jersey General Assembly from 1962 to 1968 and in the New Jersey Senate from 1968 to 1974
- Tico Torres (born 1953), drummer and percussionist for the rock band Bon Jovi
- Alan Turtletaub (1913–2005), founder of The Money Store
- Marc Turtletaub (born 1946), movie producer
- Benjamin A. Vail (1844–1924), politician who served as president of the New Jersey Senate
- Joseph Vitale (born 1954), State Senator and former mayor
- Rohit Vyas, broadcast journalist
- Dagmara Wozniak (born 1988), sabre fencer named to the U.S. Olympic team at the 2008 Summer Olympics and the 2012 Summer Olympics in women's sabre
