= John A. Hall (American football) =

American football player and coach (1877–1919)

Biographical details
- Born: September 16, 1877; Pittsburgh, Pennsylvania, U.S.
- Died: October 1, 1919 (aged 42); Long Branch, New Jersey, U.S.

Playing career
- 1897: Yale
- 1899: Duquesne Country & AC
- 1900: Homestead Library & AC
- Position: End

Coaching career (HC unless noted)
- 1898: Carlisle
- 1899–1900: Navy (assistant)

Head coaching record
- Overall: 6–4

Accomplishments and honors

Awards
- Consensus All-American (1897)

John Arthur Hall (September 16, 1877 – October 1, 1919) was an American football player and coach. He played college football for the Yale Bulldogs football team and was selected as a consensus honoree on the 1897 College Football All-America Team. He also served as the head coach of the Carlisle Indians football team in 1898. Hall also played ice hockey on intercollegiate and amateur levels for Yale University and teams in New York City and Pittsburgh.

== Early years ==
Hall was born in Pittsburgh, in 1877. His parents were Elisha Hall and Mary (Hayden) Hall. He attended preparatory school at Hillhouse High School in New Haven, Connecticut.

== Football career ==
Hall attended the Sheffield Scientific School at Yale University and studied chemistry. He received his bachelor's degree in 1897, but remained at Yale for another year engaged in graduate studies. While attending Yale, he played two years on the university hockey team and also played at the right end position on the 1897 Yale Bulldogs football team. He was a consensus first-team selection for the 1897 College Football All-America Team.

During the fall of 1898, he served as the head football coach at the Carlisle Indian School. During his one season as head coach, the Carlisle Indians football team compiled a 6–4 record and outscored its opponents by a combined total of 205 to 99. Hall was an assistant football coach at the United States Naval Academy in 1899 and 1900.

Hall played professional football for the Duquesne Country & Athletic Club in 1899 and the Homestead Library & Athletic Club in 1900.

== Ice hockey career ==
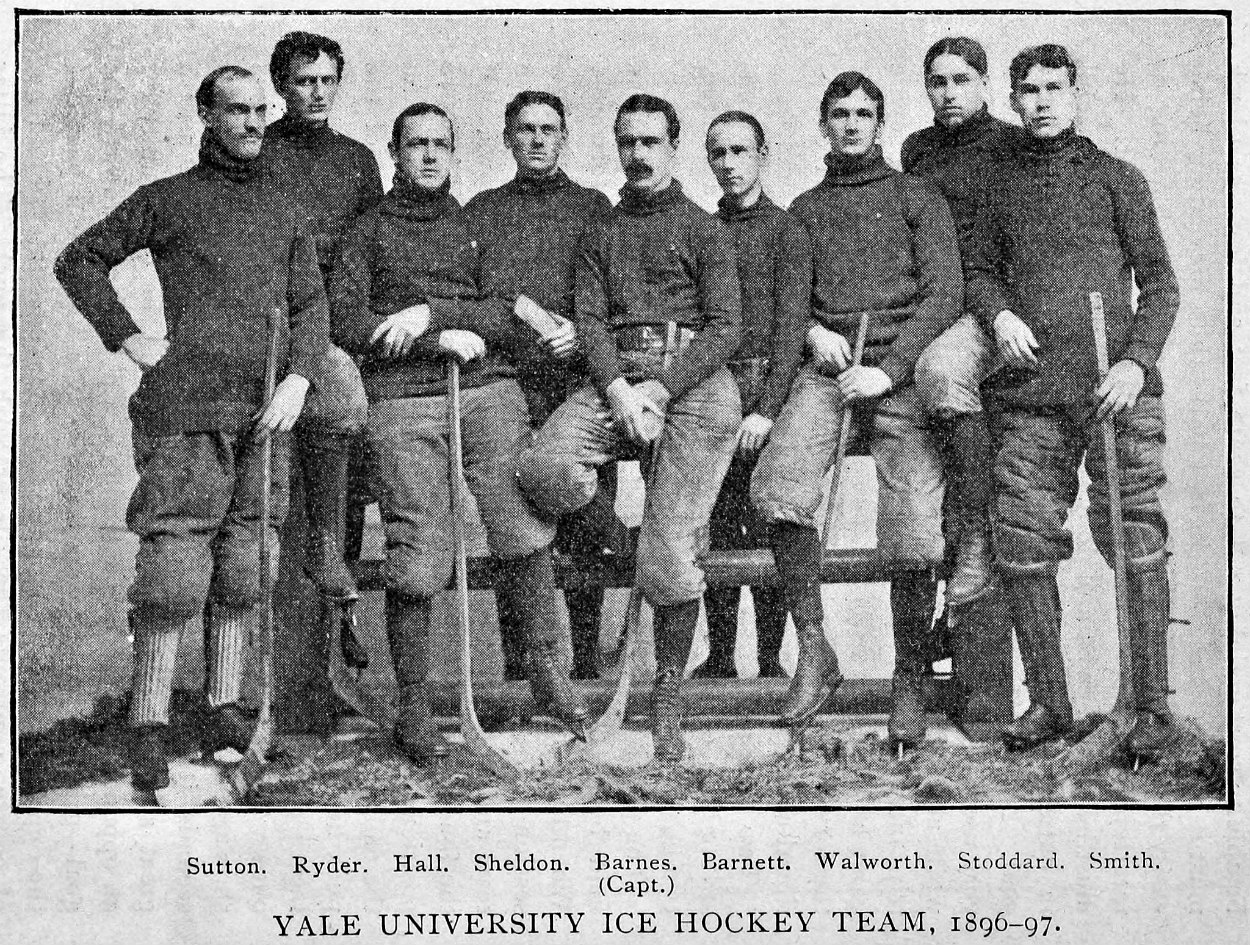
Hall, third from left, with the 1896–97 Yale University ice hockey team.

While a student at Yale University Hall also played on the university ice hockey team and was a member of the Yale team that appeared in the first intercollegiate games in the United States against a team from Johns Hopkins University in early February 1896. During the 1896–97 and 1897–98 seasons he appeared with both the Yale University team and with the Brooklyn Skating Club of the newly formed American Amateur Hockey League. Between 1898 and 1903 Hall played with different Pittsburgh teams in the Western Pennsylvania Hockey League, primarily the Duquesne Country & Athletic Club and the Keystones.

== Later years ==
In 1899, Hall began working as a chemist for the Carnegie Steel Company in Pittsburgh. He remained with Carnegie until 1902 when he went to work for the Tennessee Coal, Iron and Railroad Company. In 1903, he was superintendent of the Alice Furnaces in Birmingham, Alabama. He later moved to New Jersey where he worked as a chemical engineer for the Edison Portland Cement Company and, starting in 1913, for the Ransome Concrete Machinery Company.

Hall was married in November 1915 to Anna Franklin in a ceremony at Bridgeport, Connecticut. He served during 1916 in the Connecticut National Guard, Second Infantry, attaining the rank of battalion sergeant major. He was stationed on the Mexican border. In 1918, Hall formed Hall Machine Company, general machinists, in Elizabeth, New Jersey.

In September 1919, Hall was severely injured while driving from his summer home in Atlantic Highlands, New Jersey, to his winter home in the Sewaren neighborhood of Woodbridge Township, New Jersey. His automobile was hit by a train at a crossing in Keansburg, New Jersey. Hall's wife and mother-in-law were killed instantly, and Hall died the following day at a hospital in Long Branch, New Jersey. Hall and his wife were buried at the Evergreen Cemetery in New Haven, Connecticut.

== Head coaching record ==
Year	Team	Overall	Conference	Standing	Bowl/playoffs
Carlisle Indians (Independent) (1898)
1898	Carlisle	6–4			
Carlisle:		6–4			
Total:		6–4			
