= Michele Ross =

Author, reality TV star, cannabis advocate

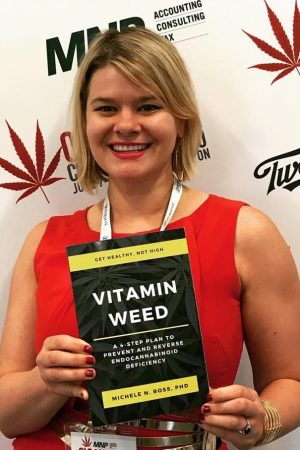
- Ross in 2018
- Born: Michele Ann Osztrogonacz; June 16, 1982 (age 44); Perth Amboy, New Jersey, U.S.
- Other name: Michele Ann Noonan
- Education: Boston College (BA); University of Texas Southwestern Medical Center at Dallas (PhD)
- Occupations: Author, media personality, neuroscientist
- Years active: 2008–present
- Website: drmicheleross.com

Michele Noonan Ross (born June 16, 1982), also known as Michele Ann Noonan, Michele Osztrogonacz, and Michele Osztrogonacz Ross, is an American neuroscientist, author, and media personality. She is a noted drug policy reform activist, promoting cannabis, magic mushroom, and kratom legalization.

== Early life ==
Ross was born on June 16, 1982, in Perth Amboy, New Jersey, and grew up in the nearby Iselin section of Woodbridge Township, New Jersey, where she graduated from John F. Kennedy Memorial High School in 2000. Ross was the first member of her family to attend college and went to Boston College, where she studied psychology and was in the class of 2004. In 2008, she graduated from the University of Texas Southwestern Medical Center at Dallas with a Ph.D. in neuroscience.

== Media appearances ==
Ross was the first scientist to participate in the American version of Big Brother, appearing in the eleventh season of the reality television series Big Brother in 2009, where she finished in fourth place. She claimed housemate and future Big Brother All Stars 2 contestant Kevin Campbell tried to poison her on the show. She and Lydia Tavera were the first bisexual women to compete on the series, and Ross came out of the closet on the show. Ross was an advocate of LGBTQ rights and was featured in as part of the Big Brother Cares NOH8 Campaign. In 2010 Ross appeared on the "Reality Gone Wild" episode of Playboy TV's Foursome. Ross won her episode of the dating competition reality show Baggage hosted by Jerry Springer in 2010. In 2013, she won her episode of the dating competition reality show Excused. In 2010 she additionally appeared in a YouTube channel "hottubsleeperpicks", as a host discussing football topics at the time.

In 2015 she was noted by The Chicago Tribune as an expert on cannabis for the platform Cannabis Club TV streaming to cannabis dispensaries.

== Career ==
=== Neuroscientist ===
Ross studied how drugs, including cannabis and cocaine, impacted the birth of new brain cells, a process called neurogenesis, and what role these newborn cells had in drug addiction. In October 2017, Marijuana Venture magazine featured Ross as one of their "Women To Watch" and highlighted her work as a cannabis scientist. In 2019, Ross was a featured speaker along with former NFL player and Celebrity Big Brother star Ricky Williams at SXSW on a panel called Cannabis and Wellness: The Body and Beyond.

=== Writing ===
In 2012, Ross co-authored a book about the neuroscience of weight loss called Train Your Brain To Get Thin which was chosen by the Today show as one of the top diet books of the year. In 2018 Ross published Vitamin Weed, the first guide for doctors and patients to understanding diseases of endocannabinoid deficiency and why cannabis treats them. In 2019 Ross published a column called Chronically Cannabis for chronic illness network The Mighty. CBD Oil For Health was published in 2020, featuring 100 different ways to use CBD oil including medical purposes, beauty recipes, and in food. In 2021 Ross published her fourth book Kratom Is Medicine, the first guide for both doctors and patients on the medical use of kratom.

=== Entrepreneur ===
Ross received her Executive MBA from the Quantic School of Business and Technology in 2018. She has created several companies, including Infused Health, a platform for cannabis coaching and education, and AURA Therapeutics, the first kratom company focused on women's health. Ross has served as a medical advisor to numerous companies in the cannabis and wellness space.

== Advocacy ==
=== Cannabis ===
Ross is considered one of the top ten influential people in cannabis. Ross founded the Endocannabinoid Deficiency Foundation in Los Angeles, California, which later changed to the name IMPACT Network in 2016 after moving to Denver, Colorado. IMPACT Network, a 501c3 nonprofit which stands for Improving Marijuana Policy and Accelerating Cannabis Therapeutics for women worldwide, received grant funding from multiple sources including Drug Policy Alliance. Ross is now a professor at the Institute of Plant-Assisted Therapy and the Holistic Cannabis Academy.

=== Psychedelics ===
Ross is known as being one of the earliest scientists to advocate for psychedelic medicine. She gave an interview in 2014 to Emmy-winning journalist Amber Lyon of Reset.Me about DMT, which garnered over three million views on YouTube. She was a co-founder of Decriminalize Denver, which successfully decriminalized psychedelic mushrooms in the first city in the United States in 2018.

== Personal life ==
Shortly before appearing on Big Brother her brother John Osztrogonacz died. Besides having fibromyalgia and post-traumatic stress disorder (PTSD), she has struggled with severe pelvic pain and was once put in a psychiatric hold because of it. Ross says without cannabis, she would have killed herself from pain and depression.

== Selected publications ==
- Boyd, Melinda with Michele Noonan (2012). Train Your Brain To Get Thin: Prime Your Gray Cells For Weight Loss, Wellness, and Exercise. ISBN 978-1-4405-4015-8.
- Ross, Michele N. (2018). Vitamin Weed: A 4-Step Plan To Prevent and Reverse Endocannabinoid Deficiency. ISBN 978-0-692-09066-4.
- Ross, Michele (2020). CBD Oil For Health: 100 Amazing Benefits and Uses of CBD Oil. ISBN 978-1-5072-1398-8.
- Ross, Michele (2021). Kratom Is Medicine: Natural Relief For Anxiety, Pain, Fatigue, and More. ISBN 978-0-578-86646-8.
