= List of neighborhoods in Woodbridge Township, New Jersey =

Woodbridge is a township in Middlesex County, New Jersey. According to the United States Census Bureau, the township had a total land area of including 23.213 square miles (60.122 km^{2}). There are many distinct sections, many of which are census-designated places (CDPs). Some have their own ZIP Codes.

Woodbridge Township's municipal administration officially recognizes ten geographical sections, reflected in its slogan "Ten small towns, one great community"; These are Avenel, Colonia, Fords, Hopelawn, Iselin, Keasbey, Menlo Park Terrace, Port Reading, Sewaren, Woodbridge (Woodbridge Proper).

Residents from the central section describe themselves as being from "Woodbridge," while people in other areas describe themselves as being from those particular communities in place of being from Woodbridge.

== Sections and neighborhoods ==
Name	Image	Coordinate	Notes	References
Avenel		40.584334°N 74.271626°W	Avenel station is located in the neighborhood	
Boynton Beach		40°32′50″N 74°15′17″W	On the Arthur Kill, once the site of amusement park and bathing beach	
Colonia		40.594133°N 74.31377°W		
Edgars		40°34′03″N 74°16′33″W		
Fords		40.543794°N 74.31292°W	Abutting Edison, it was originally known as Fords Corner.	
Hazelton		40°35′18″N 74°17′27″W		
Hopelawn	40°31′37″N 74°17′35″W			
Iselin		40.569295°N 74.321106°W	site of Metropark station	
Keasbey		40°31′00″N 74°18′19″W	At the foot of the Driscoll Bridge close to the Raritan River, originally known as Florida Grove, it abuts neighboring Perth Amboy	
Lynn Woodoaks		40°35′20″N 74°20′00″W	Along the Garden State Parkway near the Edison border	
Menlo Park Terrace		40°33′09″N 74°19′25″W	Located off U.S. Route 1 in between Menlo Park Mall and Woodbridge Center at Exit 130 of the Garden State Parkway. Uses Metuchen ZIP code 08840; John McCormac, who served as mayor, originated from this area. In 2006 he advocated for recognizing it as a distinct community, and after that point residents began doing such.	
Metropark		40.56808°N 74.329795°W	Office center built around Metropark station near the interchange of New Jersey Route 27 and Garden State Parkway	
Oak Tree Road			In Iselin and Edison	
Port Reading				
Sand Hills		40°31′30″N 74°19′10″W	Sand Hills is a neighborhood straddling Woodbridge and adjacent Edison.	
Sewaren				
Shore View		40°35′25″N 74°19′41″W	Along the Garden State Parkway near the Edison border	
Woodbridge Proper			The original settlement of Woodbridge. Site of Woodbridge Station.	
Woodbridge Center		40.556666°N 74.299213°W	Shopping mall at U.S. Route 1 and U.S. Route 9	
Woodbridge Oaks		40°34′57″N 74°20′01″W	Along the Garden State Parkway near the Edison border	

== See also ==
- Middlesex Greenway (New Jersey)
- List of neighborhoods in Edison, New Jersey
- Neighborhoods in Perth Amboy, New Jersey
