= Iselin, New Jersey =

Populated place in Middlesex County, New Jersey, US

- Census-designated place
- Location of Iselin in Middlesex County highlighted in red (left). Inset map: Location of Middlesex County in New Jersey highlighted in orange (right).

- Location in Middlesex County Location in New Jersey Location in the United States
- Coordinates: 40.569295°N 74.321106°W
- Country: United States
- State: New Jersey
- County: Middlesex
- Township: Woodbridge
- Named for: Adrian Iselin

Area
  - Total: 3.15 sq mi (8.17 km^{2})
  - Land: 3.15 sq mi (8.16 km^{2})
  - Water: 0 sq mi (0.00 km^{2}) 0.03%
- Elevation: 30 ft (9 m)

Population (2020)
  - Total: 20,088
  - Density: 6,373.1/sq mi (2,460.7/km^{2})
- Time zone: UTC−05:00 (Eastern (EST))
  - Summer (DST): UTC−04:00 (Eastern (EDT))
- ZIP Code: 08830
- Area codes: 732/848
- FIPS code: 34-34470
- GNIS feature ID: 2389973

Iselin (/ˈɪzlɪn/) is an unincorporated community and census-designated place (CDP) located within Woodbridge Township, in Middlesex County, in the U.S. state of New Jersey. As of the 2020 United States census, Iselin's population was 20,088, up from 18,695 in 2010.

Previously known as "Perrytown" and "Unionville", Iselin received its current name after New York City investment banker and philanthropist Adrian Iselin, who established a finishing school in the 1870s for girls from wealthy New York families there. Iselin additionally subsidized the erection of a new train station, which was later replaced by a newer station to the south known as Metropark.

== Geography ==
Iselin is in northeastern Middlesex County, in the northwest part of Woodbridge Township. It is bordered by the Woodbridge communities of Colonia to the north, Avenel to the northeast, Woodbridge to the southeast, and Menlo Park Terrace to the south, while to the west it is bordered by Edison Township. It is 9 miles (14 km) northeast of New Brunswick, the Middlesex county seat, and 14 miles (23 km) southwest of Newark.

According to the U.S. Census Bureau, Iselin has a total area of 3.13 square miles (8.1 km^{2}), including 0.001 square miles (0.0026 km^{2}) of water (0.03%). It is drained to the northeast by the South Branch of the Rahway River

=== Downtown area ===
Iselin's downtown is centered on Little India (also known as "Oak Tree Road"), bound by the Garden State Parkway to the west and Route 27 (Lincoln Highway) to the southeast. Once home to a wide array of shops, eateries, services, and complemented by a single-screen 1920s movie palace, the area was in obvious decline in the 1980s. An influx of Asian Indian immigration beginning in the early 1990s led to the area's revitalization. Formerly vacant stores were tenanted, and additional retail spaces built as the area became known for its high quality Indian food, sweets, clothing (particularly saris), jewelry, music, and other goods.

=== Metropark ===
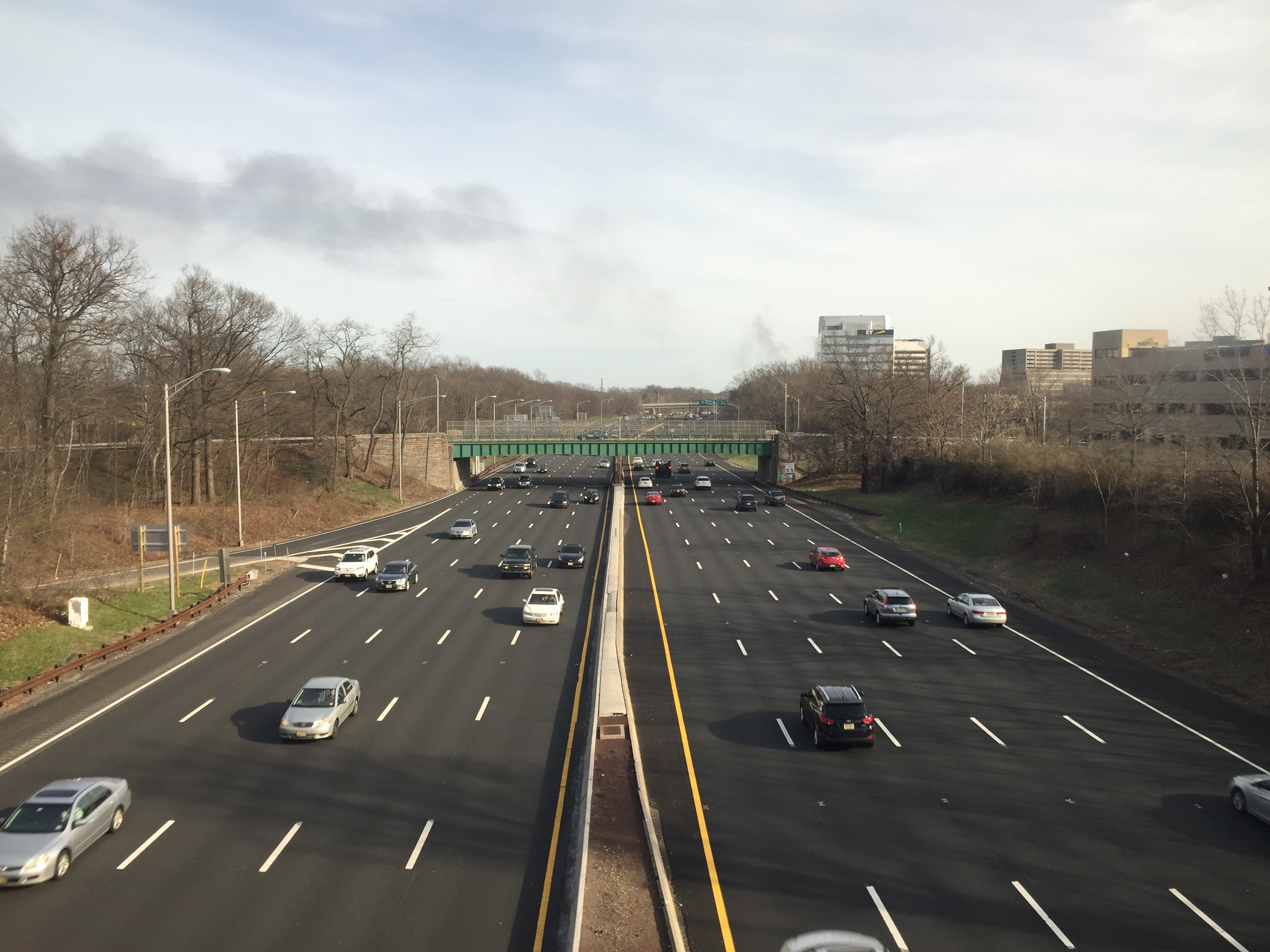
The Garden State Parkway in Iselin

An area known as Metropark, consisting primarily of office parks and large office buildings, lies in the southwestern corner of Iselin and spills over into neighboring Edison. NJ Transit and Amtrak's Metropark station is named for this area.

In addition to a Hilton Hotel (now known as "APA Hotel Woodbridge") and the train station, Metropark features the headquarters of Ansell, BASF Environmental Catalyst and Metal Solutions (formerly Engelhard) and Eaton Corporation's Filtration Division. Other corporate residents in the area include Siemens, Tata Consultancy Services, Mott MacDonald, Ernst & Young, Mizuho, Wells Fargo, JPMorgan Chase, Accenture, Level 3 Communications, BT Group, UBS, Elevance Health, and TIAA.

== Demographics ==
Historical population
Census	Pop.	Note	%±
1990	16,141		—
2000	16,698		3.5%
2010	18,695		12.0%
2020	20,088		7.5%
Population sources: 1950 1960 1970; 1980 1990 2000; 2010 2020

Iselin first appeared as a census designated place in the 1990 U.S. census.

=== Racial and ethnic composition ===
Iselin CDP, New Jersey – Racial and ethnic composition Note: the US Census treats Hispanic/Latino as an ethnic category. This table excludes Latinos from the racial categories and assigns them to a separate category. Hispanics/Latinos may be of any race.
Race / Ethnicity (NH = Non-Hispanic)	Pop 2000	Pop 2010	Pop 2020	% 2000	% 2010	% 2020
White alone (NH)	10,252	7,001	4,749	61.40%	37.45%	23.64%
Black or African American alone (NH)	974	1,193	1,275	5.83%	6.38%	6.35%
Native American or Alaska Native alone (NH)	16	49	51	0.10%	0.26%	0.25%
Asian alone (NH)	4,194	8,599	11,534	25.12%	46.00%	57.42%
Native Hawaiian or Pacific Islander alone (NH)	1	0	4	0.01%	0.00%	0.02%
Other race alone (NH)	55	63	180	0.33%	0.34%	0.90%
Mixed race or Multiracial (NH)	292	458	431	1.75%	2.45%	2.15%
Hispanic or Latino (any race)	914	1,332	1,864	5.47%	7.12%	9.28%
Total	16,698	18,695	20,088	100.00%	100.00%	100.00%

=== 2020 census ===
As of the 2020 census, Iselin had a population of 20,088. The median age was 39.4 years. 20.7% of residents were under the age of 18 and 16.7% of residents were 65 years of age or older. For every 100 females there were 96.1 males, and for every 100 females age 18 and over there were 94.0 males age 18 and over.

100.0% of residents lived in urban areas, while 0.0% lived in rural areas.

There were 6,700 households in Iselin, of which 37.0% had children under the age of 18 living in them. Of all households, 60.7% were married-couple households, 13.6% were households with a male householder and no spouse or partner present, and 22.8% were households with a female householder and no spouse or partner present. About 19.6% of all households were made up of individuals and 10.2% had someone living alone who was 65 years of age or older.

There were 6,994 housing units, of which 4.2% were vacant. The homeowner vacancy rate was 1.0% and the rental vacancy rate was 4.7%.

Racial composition as of the 2020 census
Race	Number	Percent
White	5,067	25.2%
Black or African American	1,347	6.7%
American Indian and Alaska Native	80	0.4%
Asian	11,567	57.6%
Native Hawaiian and Other Pacific Islander	5	0.0%
Some other race	936	4.7%
Two or more races	1,086	5.4%
Hispanic or Latino (of any race)	1,864	9.3%

=== 2010 census ===
The 2010 United States census counted 18,695 people, 6,445 households, and 4,892 families in the CDP. The population density was 5,861.5 people per square mile (2,263.1 people/km^{2}). There were 6,718 housing units at an average density of 2,106.3 units per square mile (813.2 units/km^{2}). The racial makeup was 41.47% (7,753) White, 6.72% (1,257) Black or African American, 0.33% (62) Native American, 46.12% (8,623) Asian, 0.00% (0) Pacific Islander, 2.26% (423) from other races, and 3.09% (577) from two or more races. Hispanic or Latino of any race were 7.12% (1,332) of the population.

Of the 6,445 households, 33.2% had children under the age of 18; 62.4% were married couples living together; 9.4% had a female householder with no husband present and 24.1% were non-families. Of all households, 20.7% were made up of individuals and 10.1% had someone living alone who was 65 years of age or older. The average household size was 2.90 and the average family size was 3.39.

21.0% of the population were under the age of 18, 8.0% from 18 to 24, 29.3% from 25 to 44, 27.7% from 45 to 64, and 14.0% who were 65 years of age or older. The median age was 38.5 years. For every 100 females, the population had 95.7 males. For every 100 females ages 18 and older there were 94.8 males.

=== 2000 census ===
As of the 2000 United States census there were 16,698 people, 6,007 households, and 4,511 families residing in the CDP. The population density was 2,059.8 people/km^{2} (5,335 people/mi^{2}). There were 6,137 housing units at an average density of 757.0 units/km^{2} (1,961 units/mi^{2}). The racial makeup of the CDP was 64.65% White, 6.02% African American, 0.12% Native American, 25.16% Asian, 0.01% Pacific Islander, 1.75% from other races, and 2.28% from two or more races. Hispanic or Latino of any race were 5.47% of the population.

There were 6,007 households, out of which 32.0% had children under the age of 18 living with them, 61.5% were married couples living together, 9.8% had a female householder with no husband present, and 24.9% were non-families. 20.8% of all households were made up of individuals, and 8.6% had someone living alone who was 65 years of age or older. The average household size was 2.78 and the average family size was 3.24.

In the CDP the population was spread out, with 21.8% under the age of 18, 7.6% from 18 to 24, 33.9% from 25 to 44, 22.7% from 45 to 64, and 14.0% who were 65 years of age or older. The median age was 37 years. For every 100 females, there were 96.8 males. For every 100 females age 18 and over, there were 95.1 males.

The median income for a household in the CDP was $65,424, and the median income for a family was $71,913. Males had a median income of $50,145 versus $36,131 for females. The per capita income for the CDP was $26,793. About 1.9% of families and 3.2% of the population were below the poverty line, including 2.8% of those under age 18 and 4.9% of those age 65 or over.

=== South Asian community ===
Iselin hosts one of the region's main centers of Indian American cultural diversity. The growing Little India is a South Asian-focused commercial strip in Middlesex County, the U.S. county with the highest concentration of Indian Americans. The Oak Tree Road strip runs for about one-and-a-half miles through Iselin and neighboring Edison Township, near the area's sprawling Chinatown and Koreatown, running along New Jersey Route 27. The zone is the largest and most diverse South Asian cultural hub in the United States. In Middlesex County, election ballots are printed in English, Spanish, Gujarati, Hindi, and Punjabi. According to the 2017 American Community Survey, 42.6% of Iselin residents identified themselves as being Indian American, the highest percentage for any census-designated place in the United States.

== Education ==
Iselin public school students attend the schools of the Woodbridge Township School District. Indiana Avenue School #18, Kennedy Park School #24, Robert Mascenik School #26, and Oak Tree Road School #29 are located in Iselin as well as Iselin Middle School and John F. Kennedy Memorial High School.

When it opened in 2018, Oak Tree Road School #29 was the first new public school in Woodbridge in nearly 50 years, although the building was formerly occupied by the St. Cecelia's Church parish school (affiliated with the Roman Catholic Diocese of Metuchen).

== Notable people ==
People who were born in, residents of, or otherwise closely associated with Iselin include:

- Tom DeSanto (born 1968), film producer and screenwriter best known for his work with long-time friend Bryan Singer, especially with his contributions to the first two X-Men movies
- Robbie E (born 1983), professional wrestler with Impact Wrestling on POP TV
- Dina Hashem (born 1989), stand-up comedian, voice actress and writer
- Michele Ross (born 1982), neuroscientist and media personality
- Mutt (G.I. Joe), fictional character from the G.I. Joe: A Real American Hero toyline, comic books and animated series
- Chris Smith (born 1953), U.S. representative for New Jersey's 4th congressional district since 1981
- James Swann (born 1964), serial killer whose random drive-by shotgun shootings in Washington, D.C. in 1993 earned him the nickname "The Shotgun Stalker" in the press

== See also ==
- List of neighborhoods in Edison, New Jersey
- List of neighborhoods in Woodbridge Township, New Jersey
