= Keasbey, New Jersey =

Populated place in Middlesex County, New Jersey, US

- Census-designated place
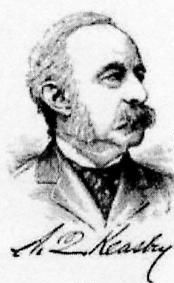
- Anthony Quinton Keasbey

- Location in Middlesex County Location in New Jersey Location in the United States
- Coordinates: 40°31′00″N 74°18′19″W
- Country: United States
- State: New Jersey
- County: Middlesex
- Township: Woodbridge
- Named for: Keasbey family

Area
  - Total: 1.80 sq mi (4.66 km^{2})
  - Land: 1.46 sq mi (3.78 km^{2})
  - Water: 0.34 sq mi (0.88 km^{2})
- Elevation: 36 ft (11 m)

Population (2020)
  - Total: 3,027
  - Density: 2,073.3/sq mi (800.5/km^{2})
- ZIP Code: 08832
- FIPS code: 34-36570
- GNIS feature ID: 0877527

Keasbey (pronounced "KAYS-bee") is a census-designated place (CDP) and unincorporated community in Woodbridge Township, Middlesex County, New Jersey, United States. It is located in the western outskirts of adjacent Perth Amboy. As of the 2020 census, the CDP's population was 3,027. Many Hispanic / Latino families have relocated from Perth Amboy to Keasbey.

== History ==
Keasbey was originally known as "Florida Grove" due to its picnic areas and beaches on the Raritan River.

The community is named after the Keasbey family, whose home in Morristown is now Macculloch Hall, a museum. One of the brick manufacturers established in Keasbey was owned by the Keasbey family.

Arizona Beverage Company, the makers of AriZona Iced Tea, opened AriZonaLand at its 70-acre (28 ha) facility, offering visitors a "Willy-Wonka-esque" tour of its factory, complete with a gift shop and museum.

Major sections of Smith Street, a critical artery connecting Keasbey to Perth Amboy has been closed since September 2025, when a quarter-mile-long crack split the roadway, leading to months of anticipated repairs and significant traffic detours related to reconstruction of the road.

== Geography ==
Keasbey is in northeastern Middlesex County, occupying the southern end of Woodbridge Township. It is bordered to the north by Fords within Woodbridge Township; to the east by the city of Perth Amboy; to the west by Edison Township; and to the south by the Raritan River, across which is the borough of Sayreville.

The Garden State Parkway and the Route 440 freeway intersect in Keasbey. Newark is 19 miles (31 km) to the northeast, New Brunswick, the Middlesex county seat, is 9 miles (14 km) to the southwest, and Staten Island, New York, is 4 miles (6 km) to the east across the Arthur Kill.

According to the United States Census Bureau, the Keasbey CDP has an area of 1.80 square miles (4.66 km^{2}), of which 1.46 square miles (3.78 km^{2}) are land and 0.34 square miles (0.88 km^{2}), or 18.80%, are water, consisting of the northern half of the Raritan River waterway.

== Demographics ==
Historical population
Census	Pop.	Note	%±
2020	3,027		—
2020

Keasbey first appeared as a census designated place in the 2020 United States census.

=== 2020 census ===
As of the 2020 census, Keasbey had a population of 3,027. The median age was 35.4 years. 22.7% of residents were under the age of 18 and 8.5% of residents were 65 years of age or older. For every 100 females there were 89.8 males, and for every 100 females age 18 and over there were 88.2 males age 18 and over.

100.0% of residents lived in urban areas, while 0.0% lived in rural areas.

There were 1,098 households in Keasbey, of which 36.8% had children under the age of 18 living in them. Of all households, 38.3% were married-couple households, 16.8% were households with a male householder and no spouse or partner present, and 36.2% were households with a female householder and no spouse or partner present. About 25.5% of all households were made up of individuals and 9.0% had someone living alone who was 65 years of age or older.

There were 1,110 housing units, of which 1.1% were vacant. The homeowner vacancy rate was 1.0% and the rental vacancy rate was 0.7%.

Keasbey CDP, New Jersey – Racial and ethnic composition Note: the US Census treats Hispanic/Latino as an ethnic category. This table excludes Latinos from the racial categories and assigns them to a separate category. Hispanics/Latinos may be of any race.
Race / Ethnicity (NH = Non-Hispanic)	Pop 2020	2020
White alone (NH)	400	13.21%
Black or African American alone (NH)	251	8.29%
Native American or Alaska Native alone (NH)	1	0.03%
Asian alone (NH)	151	4.99%
Native Hawaiian or Pacific Islander alone (NH)	4	0.13%
Other race alone (NH)	11	0.36%
Mixed race or Multiracial (NH)	43	1.42%
Hispanic or Latino (any race)	2,166	71.56%
Total	3,027	100.00%

== Education ==
Residents are zoned to the Woodbridge Township School District.

- Grade K–5: Lafayette School 25
- Grade 6–8: Fords Middle School
- Grade 9–12: Depending on location. J.F.K. Memorial High School or Woodbridge High School.

== In media ==
The third wave ska band Catch 22 referenced Keasbey in the title of their album Keasbey Nights in 1998. The album was re-recorded by Streetlight Manifesto in 2006.

== Companies ==
Major employers include:

- FedEx Ground, operates a regional hub
- Wakefern, ShopRite's owner and distributor, has its corporate headquarters in Keasbey
