= Sewaren, New Jersey =

Populated place in Middlesex County, New Jersey, US

- Census-designated place
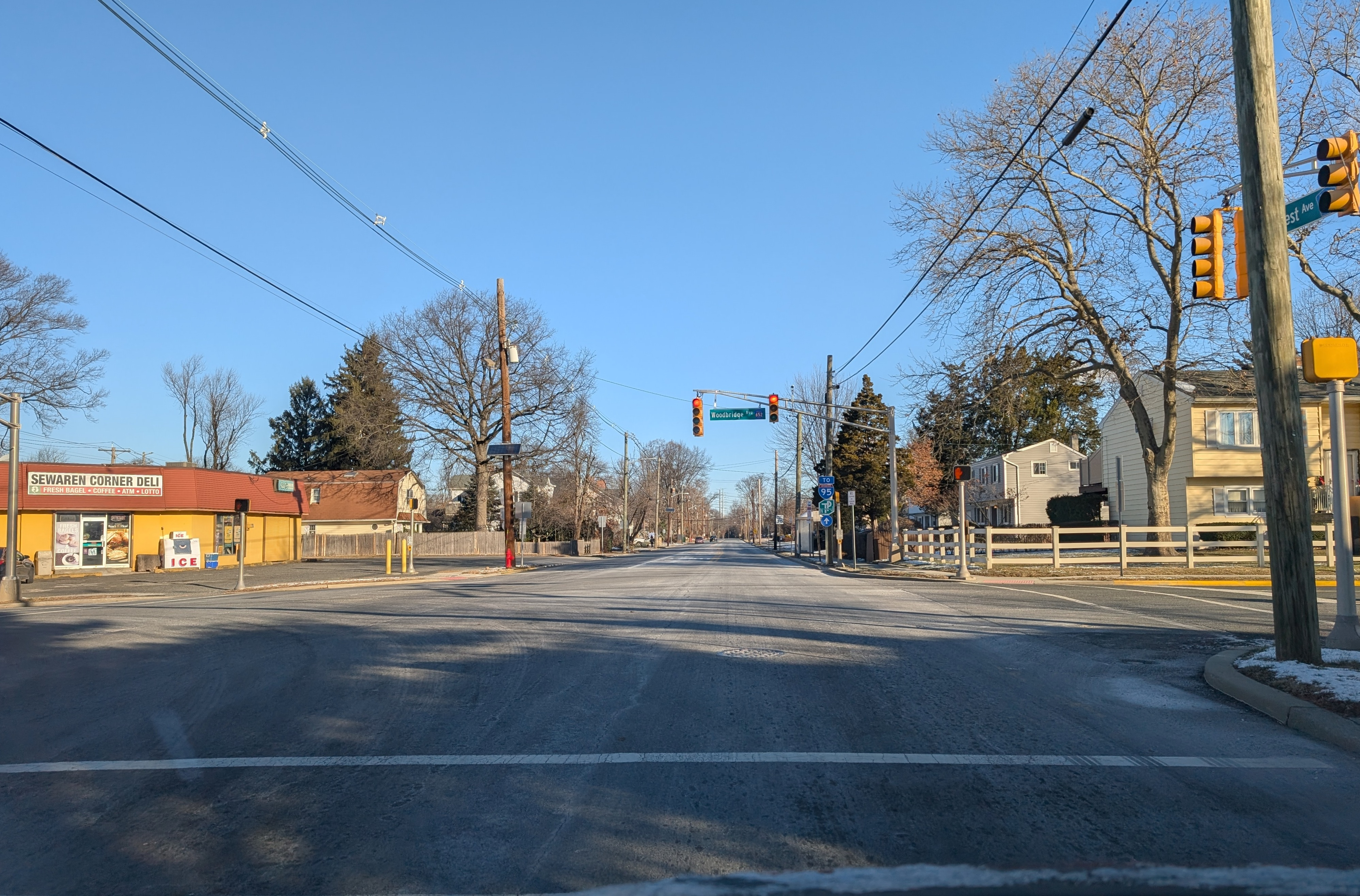
- Northbound West Avenue (CR 611) at Woodbridge Avenue (CR 652)

- Map of Sewaren highlighted within Middlesex County. Right: Location of Middlesex County in New Jersey.

- Location in Middlesex County Location in New Jersey Location in the United States
- Coordinates: 40.550726°N 74.259885°W
- Country: United States
- State: New Jersey
- County: Middlesex
- Township: Woodbridge

Area
  - Total: 1.66 sq mi (4.30 km^{2})
  - Land: 1.22 sq mi (3.16 km^{2})
  - Water: 0.44 sq mi (1.13 km^{2}) 5.02%
- Elevation: 16 ft (5 m)

Population (2020)
  - Total: 2,885
  - Density: 2,361/sq mi (911.7/km^{2})
- Time zone: UTC−05:00 (Eastern (EST))
  - Summer (DST): UTC−04:00 (Eastern (EDT))
- ZIP Code: 07077
- Area codes: 732/848
- FIPS code: 34-66720
- GNIS feature ID: 02390280

Sewaren (pronounced SEE-waren) is an unincorporated community and census-designated place (CDP) within Woodbridge Township, Middlesex County, New Jersey, United States. As of the 2020 census, the CDP's population was 2,885.

PSE&G's Sewaren Generating Station is a 538-megawatt facility on 152 acres (62 ha) along the Arthur Kill. The facility had five steam generators and one combustion turbine. Four of the steam units were installed during and just after World War II, from 1942 to 1951. Generator 5, which included a gas/oil-fired boiler and two turbine generators, came down in 2002. Seawaren Unit #7 was installed in 2018, 538 MW, combined cycle combustion turbine, with one combustion turbine, one heat recovery steam generator, HRSG, and one steam turbine.

== Geography ==
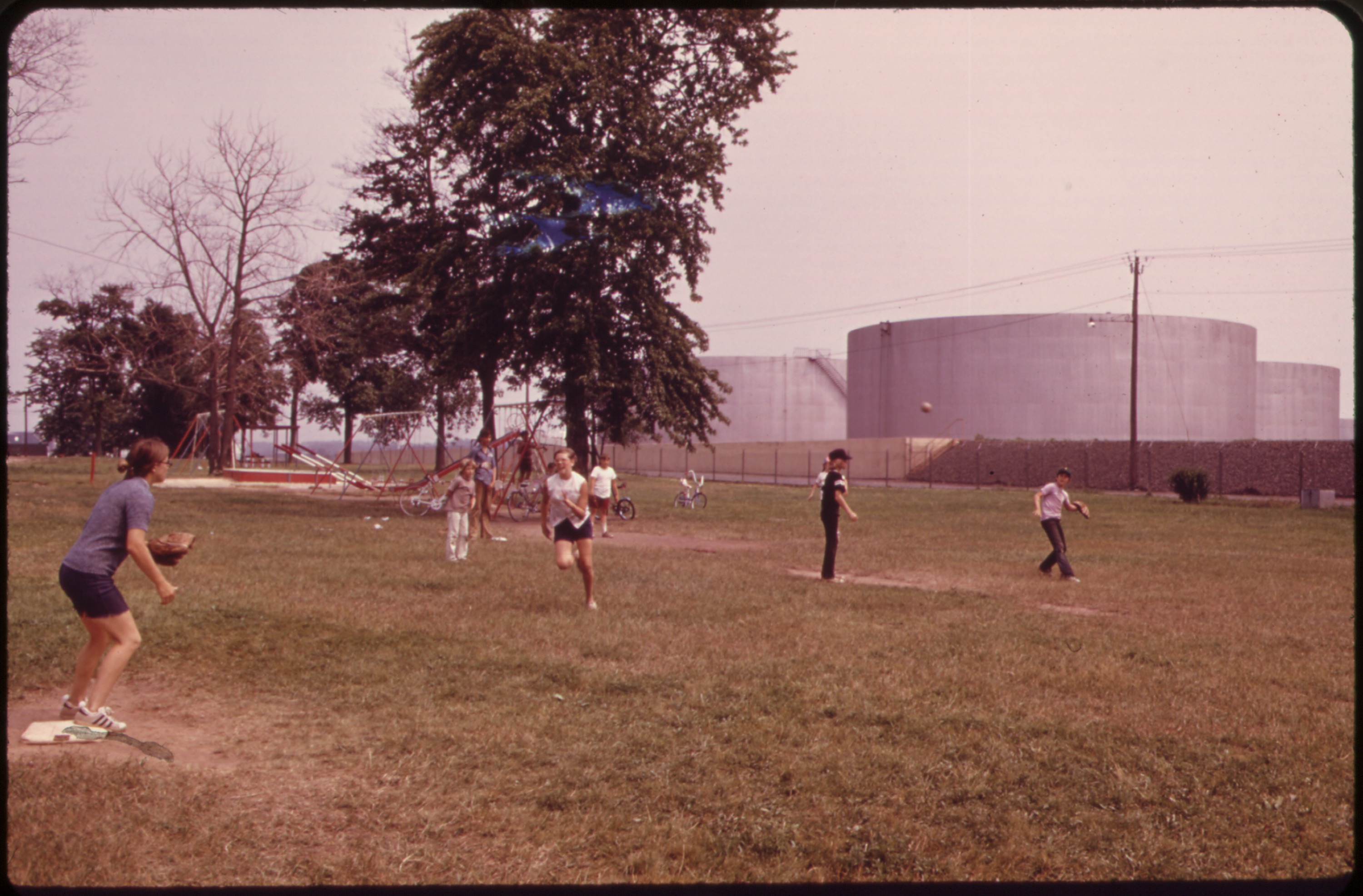
Baseball in Ferry Street Park, with Shell Oil's tank farm in the background, 1973

Sewaren is in northeastern Middlesex County, in southeastern Woodbridge Township. It is bordered to the south by the city of Perth Amboy, to the west by Woodbridge proper, to the north by Port Reading, also within Woodbridge Township, and to the east by the Arthur Kill waterway, separating Sewaren from Staten Island, New York. The borough of Carteret is 2 miles (3 km) to the north, and the Outerbridge Crossing leading to New York is the same distance to the south.

According to the U.S. Census Bureau, the Sewaren CDP has a total area of 1.66 square miles (4.30 km^{2}), including 1.22 square miles (3.16 km^{2}) of land and 0.44 square miles (1.14 km^{2}) of water (26.3%). Woodbridge Creek forms the western and southern border of the community and the tidal Arthur Kill forms the eastern border, while Smith Creek flows through the east side of the community.

== Demographics ==
Historical population
Census	Pop.	Note	%±
1990	2,569		—
2000	2,780		8.2%
2010	2,756		−0.9%
2020	2,885		4.7%
Population sources: 1950 1960 1970; 1980 1990 2000; 2010 2020

Sewaren first appeared as a census designated place in the 1990 U.S. census.

=== Racial and ethnic composition ===
Sewaren CDP, New Jersey – Racial and ethnic composition Note: the US Census treats Hispanic/Latino as an ethnic category. This table excludes Latinos from the racial categories and assigns them to a separate category. Hispanics/Latinos may be of any race.
Race / Ethnicity (NH = Non-Hispanic)	Pop 2000	Pop 2010	Pop 2020	% 2000	% 2010	% 2020
White alone (NH)	2,204	1,829	1,451	79.28%	66.36%	50.29%
Black or African American alone (NH)	146	201	299	5.25%	7.29%	10.36%
Native American or Alaska Native alone (NH)	4	3	0	0.14%	0.11%	0.00%
Asian alone (NH)	130	170	145	4.68%	6.17%	5.03%
Native Hawaiian or Pacific Islander alone (NH)	1	0	0	0.04%	0.00%	0.00%
Other race alone (NH)	14	10	17	0.50%	0.36%	0.59%
Mixed race or Multiracial (NH)	15	28	81	0.54%	1.02%	2.81%
Hispanic or Latino (any race)	266	515	892	9.57%	18.69%	30.92%
Total	2,780	2,756	2,885	100.00%	100.00%	100.00%

=== 2020 census ===
As of the 2020 census, Sewaren had a population of 2,885. The median age was 42.2 years. 20.7% of residents were under the age of 18 and 18.8% of residents were 65 years of age or older. For every 100 females there were 93.1 males, and for every 100 females age 18 and over there were 91.5 males age 18 and over.

100.0% of residents lived in urban areas, while 0.0% lived in rural areas.

There were 1,037 households in Sewaren, of which 30.5% had children under the age of 18 living in them. Of all households, 48.1% were married-couple households, 17.1% were households with a male householder and no spouse or partner present, and 27.8% were households with a female householder and no spouse or partner present. About 26.0% of all households were made up of individuals and 13.9% had someone living alone who was 65 years of age or older.

There were 1,103 housing units, of which 6.0% were vacant. The homeowner vacancy rate was 2.7% and the rental vacancy rate was 9.0%.

=== 2010 census ===
The 2010 United States census counted 2,756 people, 1,005 households, and 722 families in the CDP. The population density was 2,889.2 people per square mile (1,115.5 people/km^{2}). There were 1,043 housing units at an average density of 1,093.4 units per square mile (422.2 units/km^{2}). The racial makeup was 79.54% (2,192) White, 7.98% (220) Black or African American, 0.15% (4) Native American, 6.20% (171) Asian, 0.18% (5) Pacific Islander, 3.74% (103) from other races, and 2.21% (61) from two or more races. Hispanic or Latino of any race were 18.69% (515) of the population.

Of the 1,005 households, 30.0% had children under the age of 18; 53.1% were married couples living together; 14.7% had a female householder with no husband present and 28.2% were non-families. Of all households, 22.2% were made up of individuals and 7.4% had someone living alone who was 65 years of age or older. The average household size was 2.74 and the average family size was 3.26.

21.8% of the population were under the age of 18, 8.6% from 18 to 24, 26.3% from 25 to 44, 30.8% from 45 to 64, and 12.5% who were 65 years of age or older. The median age was 40.5 years. For every 100 females, the population had 92.6 males. For every 100 females ages 18 and older there were 92.4 males.

=== 2000 census ===
As of the 2000 United States census there were 2,780 people, 1,019 households, and 768 families living in the CDP. The population density was 1,129.9 people/km^{2} (2,926 people/mi^{2}). There were 1,046 housing units at an average density of 425.1 units/km^{2} (1,101 units/mi^{2}). The racial makeup of the CDP was 85.36% White, 5.72% African American, 0.18% Native American, 4.71% Asian, 0.04% Pacific Islander, 2.73% from other races, and 1.26% from two or more races. Hispanic or Latino of any race were 9.57% of the population.

There were 1,019 households, out of which 34.5% had children under the age of 18 living with them, 57.0% were married couples living together, 13.5% had a female householder with no husband present, and 24.6% were non-families. 20.6% of all households were made up of individuals, and 7.0% had someone living alone who was 65 years of age or older. The average household size was 2.73 and the average family size was 3.16.

In the CDP the population was spread out, with 23.8% under the age of 18, 7.5% from 18 to 24, 31.5% from 25 to 44, 24.6% from 45 to 64, and 12.6% who were 65 years of age or older. The median age was 38 years. For every 100 females, there were 92.8 males. For every 100 females age 18 and over, there were 88.1 males.

The median income for a household in the CDP was $62,381, and the median income for a family was $72,685. Males had a median income of $46,683 versus $35,655 for females. The per capita income for the CDP was $24,681. About 2.5% of families and 3.5% of the population were below the poverty line, including 0.6% of those under age 18 and 4.6% of those age 65 or over.

== Education ==
Sewaren has one elementary school, Matthew Jago School #28.

== Notable people ==
People who were born in, residents of, or otherwise closely associated with Sewaren include:

- John A. Hall (1877–1919), collegiate football player who was head coach of the Carlisle Indians football team in 1898
- Arthur A. Quinn (1866–1957), American labor union leader and politician
