= List of Detroit Lions Pro Bowl selections =

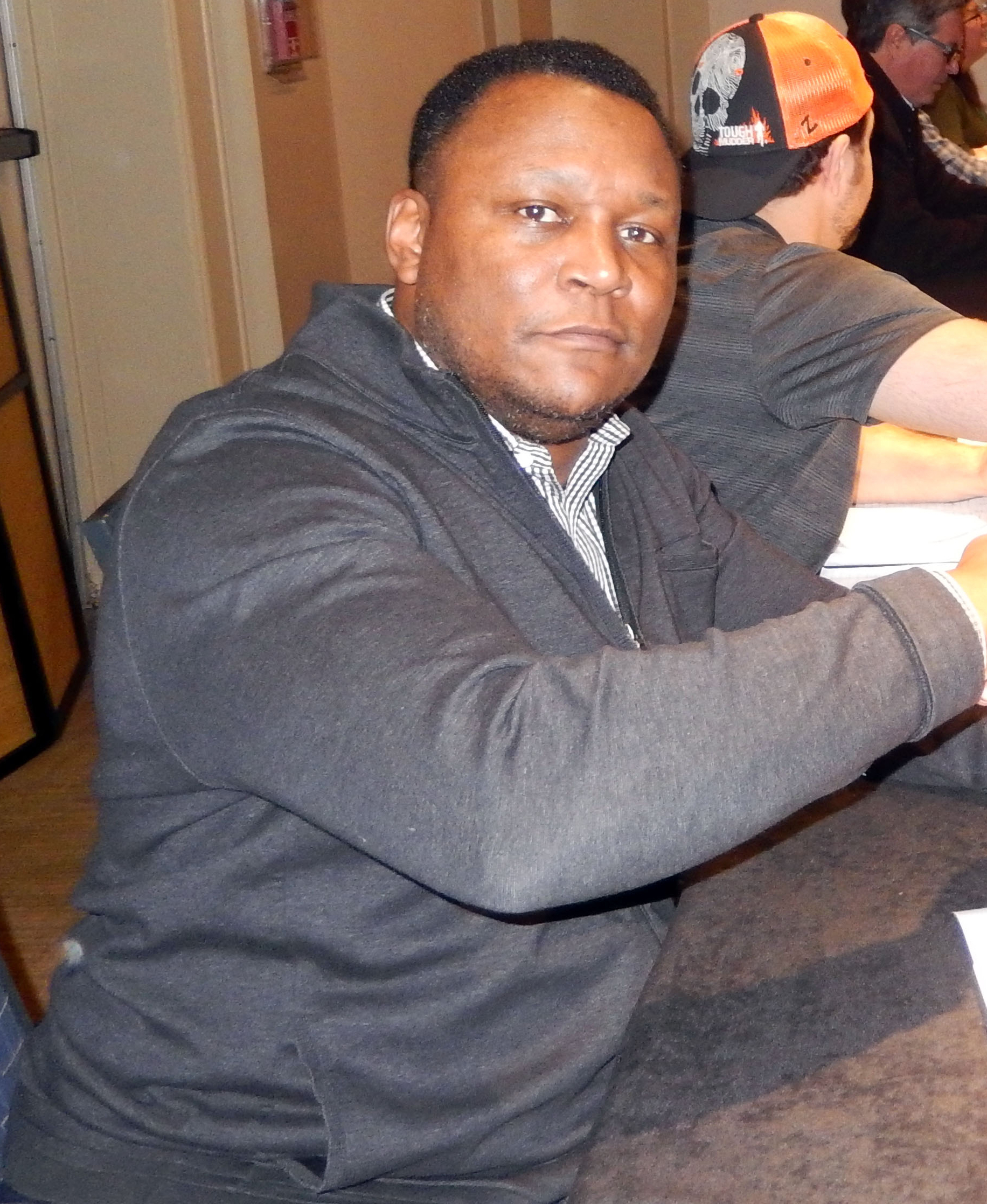
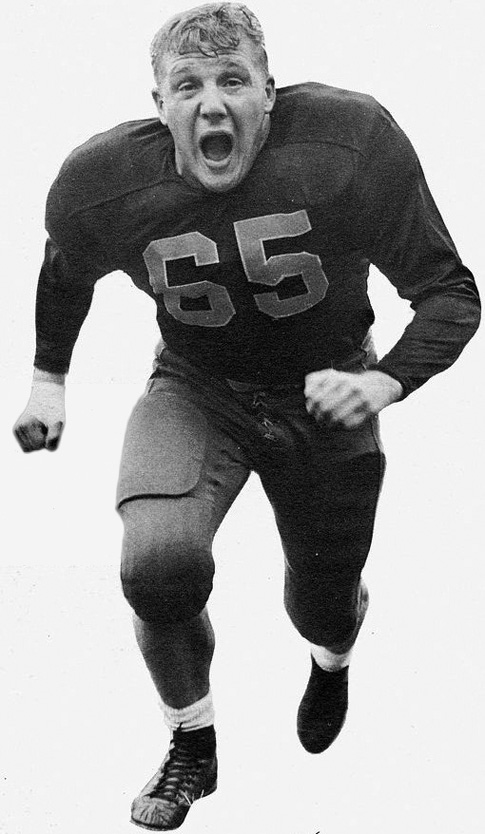
Barry Sanders (top) and Joe Schmidt (bottom) jointly hold the team record for most Pro Bowl selections, with 10 each. Sanders, a running back, was selected to the Pro Bowl 10 consecutive times, being chosen every season that he played in the NFL. Schmidt, a linebacker, was also selected to 10 consecutive Pro Bowls during the 1950s and 1960s. Both players were selected to the 100th Anniversary All-Time Team.

The Detroit Lions are a professional American football team based in Detroit, Michigan. The Lions compete in the National Football League (NFL) as a member of the North Division of the National Football Conference (NFC). The franchise was founded in Portsmouth, Ohio, as the Portsmouth Spartans and joined the NFL on July 12, 1930. After being purchased by George A. Richards in 1934, the franchise was relocated to Detroit and renamed to the Detroit Lions in reference to the city's Major League Baseball franchise, the Detroit Tigers. The team plays its home games at Ford Field in Downtown Detroit.

Starting with the 1938 NFL season, the NFL instituted an All-Star Game that pitted the league's championship team against a team made up of the best players from the remaining teams. Five of these exhibition games were played, with the last occurring after the 1942 NFL season, before the NFL reduced the number of teams and games in the season due to players serving in World War II. The first official Pro Bowl occurred in 1951 following the 1950 NFL season. From the 1950 season until the 1969 season, the exhibition game was played between teams representing the Eastern and Western Conferences of the NFL. After the American Football League (AFL) merged with the NFL in 1970, the game was played between teams representing the NFC and the American Football Conference (AFC). The conference team format remained until 2014 when the NFL shifted to a fantasy football format with teams selected by captains from the full pool of Pro Bowl selectees. This format only lasted for three seasons before it reverted to the conference team format from the 2016 to 2021 NFL seasons; this period included the cancellation of the 2021 Pro Bowl due to the COVID-19 pandemic (teams were still selected and players were still recognized as Pro Bowl selectees). Starting with the 2023 Pro Bowl after the 2022 NFL season, the NFL again changed the format; instead of playing an exhibition game, the Pro Bowl was converted to series of skill competitions that culminated in a non-contact flag football game.

Pro Bowl selections are made by a cumulative vote by three groups that hold equal weight: coaches, players, and fans. Based on the vote results, each team is filled out based on generic offense, defense, and special teams. Before the institution of the Pro Bowl Games in 2023, the players with the most votes were named starters, while the remainder of the selectees were reserves. If a Pro Bowl selectee is unable to participate in the Pro Bowl, either for health reasons or the fact that they are playing in the Super Bowl right after the Pro Bowl, an alternate is named in the player's place. Alternate players are still considered official Pro Bowl selectees. The coaching staffs for each team have been selected in various ways, with the common option being the coaching staffs of the team with the best record in each conference who were not going to the Super Bowl given the honors. With the onset of the Pro Bowl Games, the NFL now selects the coaching staffs for the flag football game. Players for each team are paid for their participation, with a higher sum going to the winning team. Throughout the life of the Pro Bowl, awards have been given out to recognize the best player or players of the game. From 2016 to 2022, an award was given to an offensive and defensive most valuable player (MVP).

The Lions have had representatives at the Pro Bowl every year since 1950 except for nine seasons. The Lions' first selections in the inaugural Pro Bowl in 1951 were Cloyce Box, Lou Creekmur, Don Doll, Thurman McGraw, and Doak Walker. Four Lions have been given a Pro Bowl MVP award. Linebacker Joe Schmidt and running back Barry Sanders are tied for the team record for most Pro Bowl selections with 10, while Yale Lary (9 selections), and Lou Creekmur (8 selections) round out the top four. Sanders was the first player to play at least 10 seasons in the NFL and be selected to the Pro Bowl in each season they played. The most recent Pro Bowl selections for the Lions were Brian Branch, Taylor Decker, Jack Fox, Jahmyr Gibbs, Jared Goff, Frank Ragnow, Penei Sewell, and Amon-Ra St. Brown for the 2025 Pro Bowl Games.

== Selections ==
=== All-Star Game (1938–42) ===
Augie Lio was selected for two All-Star Games.

Detroit Lions NFL All-Star Game selections by year
Season	All-Star Game	# of Lions selected	Players (# of All-Star Games with Lions)	Position (Note: The position which the player was elected to the All-Star Game for.)	Refs
1938	January 1939	2	Lloyd Cardwell (1)	Back	
1938	January 1939	2	Bill Radovich (1)	Guard	
1939	January 1940	3	Raymond George (1)	Tackle	
1939	January 1940	3	Jack Johnson (1)	Tackle	
1939	January 1940	3	Fred Vanzo (1)	Back	
1940	December 1940	4	Lloyd Cardwell (2)	Back	
1940	December 1940	4	Charles Price (1) (Note: Sources conflict on whether Lloyd Cardwell and Byron White were selected to the December 1940 All-Star Game. Pro Football Reference does not include them on the team, while sources from the time note that both players were selected and practicing with the All-Star team.)	Back	
1940	December 1940	4	Harry Smith (1)	Guard	
1940	December 1940	4	Byron White (1)	Back	
1941	January 1942	2	Augie Lio (1)	Guard	
1941	January 1942	2	John Tripson (1)	Tackle	
1942	December 1942	2	Harry Hopp (1)	Tailback	
1942	December 1942	2	Augie Lio (2)	Guard	

=== Pro Bowl (1950–present) ===
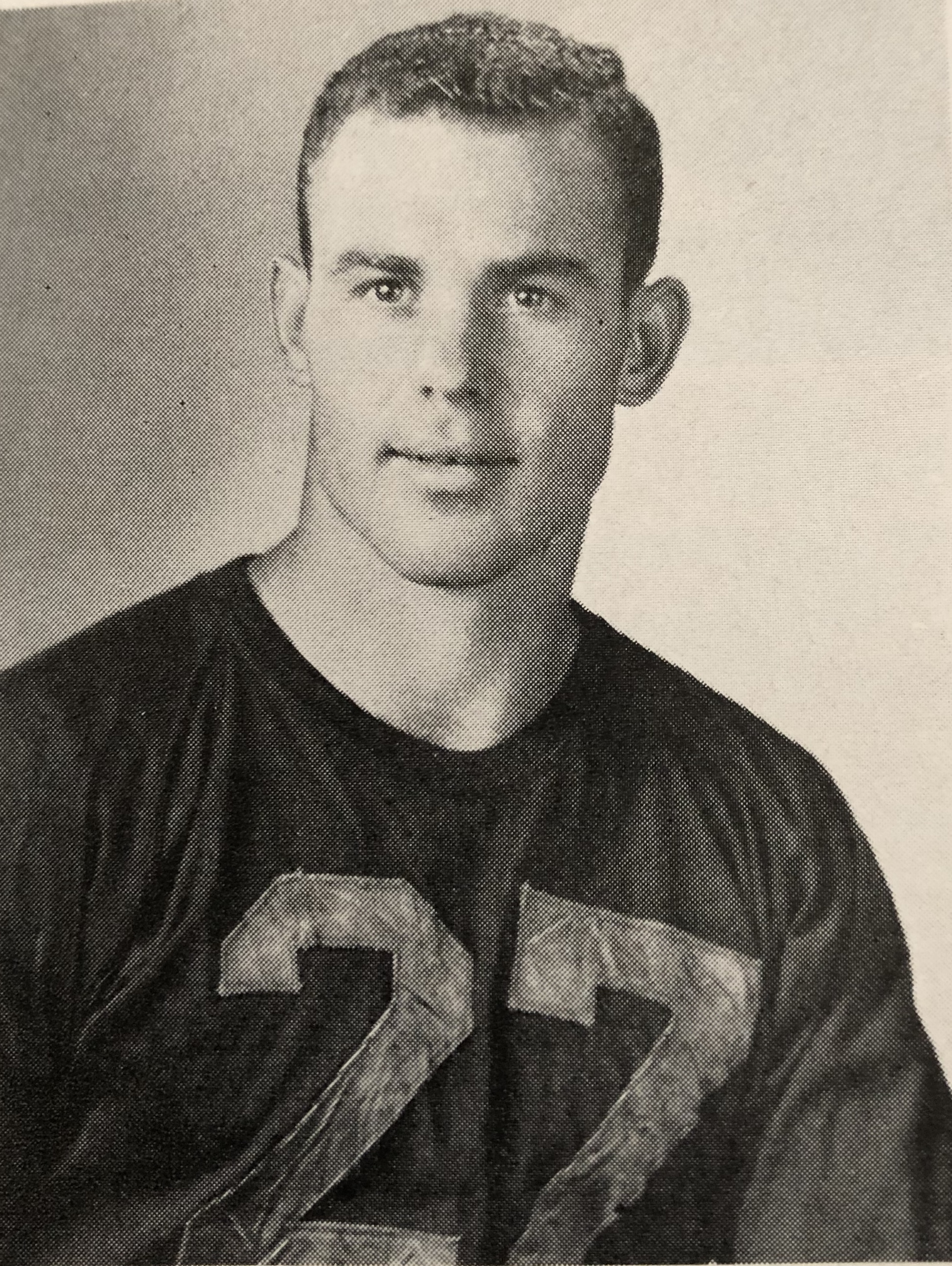
Don Doll, in his third of four Pro Bowl appearances for the Lions, was the 1953 Pro Bowl MVP.

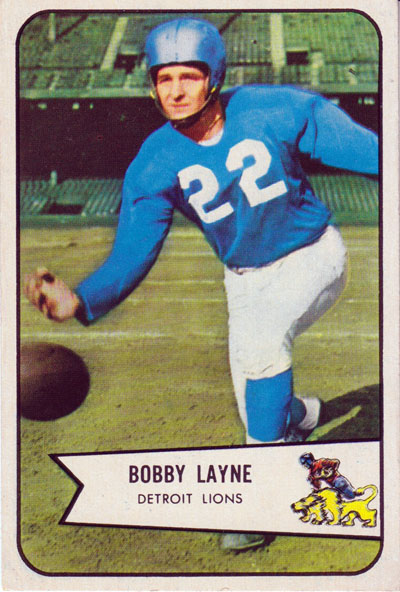
Bobby Layne was selected to five Pro Bowls during the 1950s.

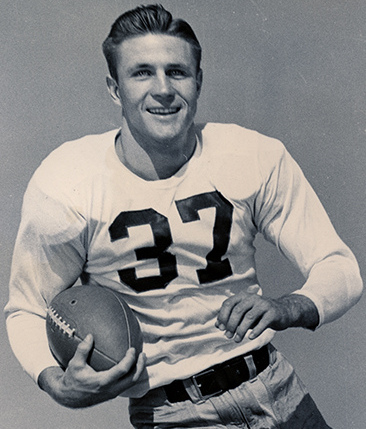
Doak Walker made the Pro Bowl five times, only missing it once during his career.

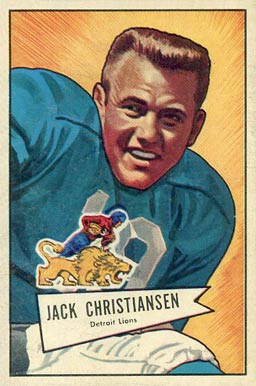
Jack Christiansen made five Pro Bowls as a safety during the 1950s before retiring to coach.

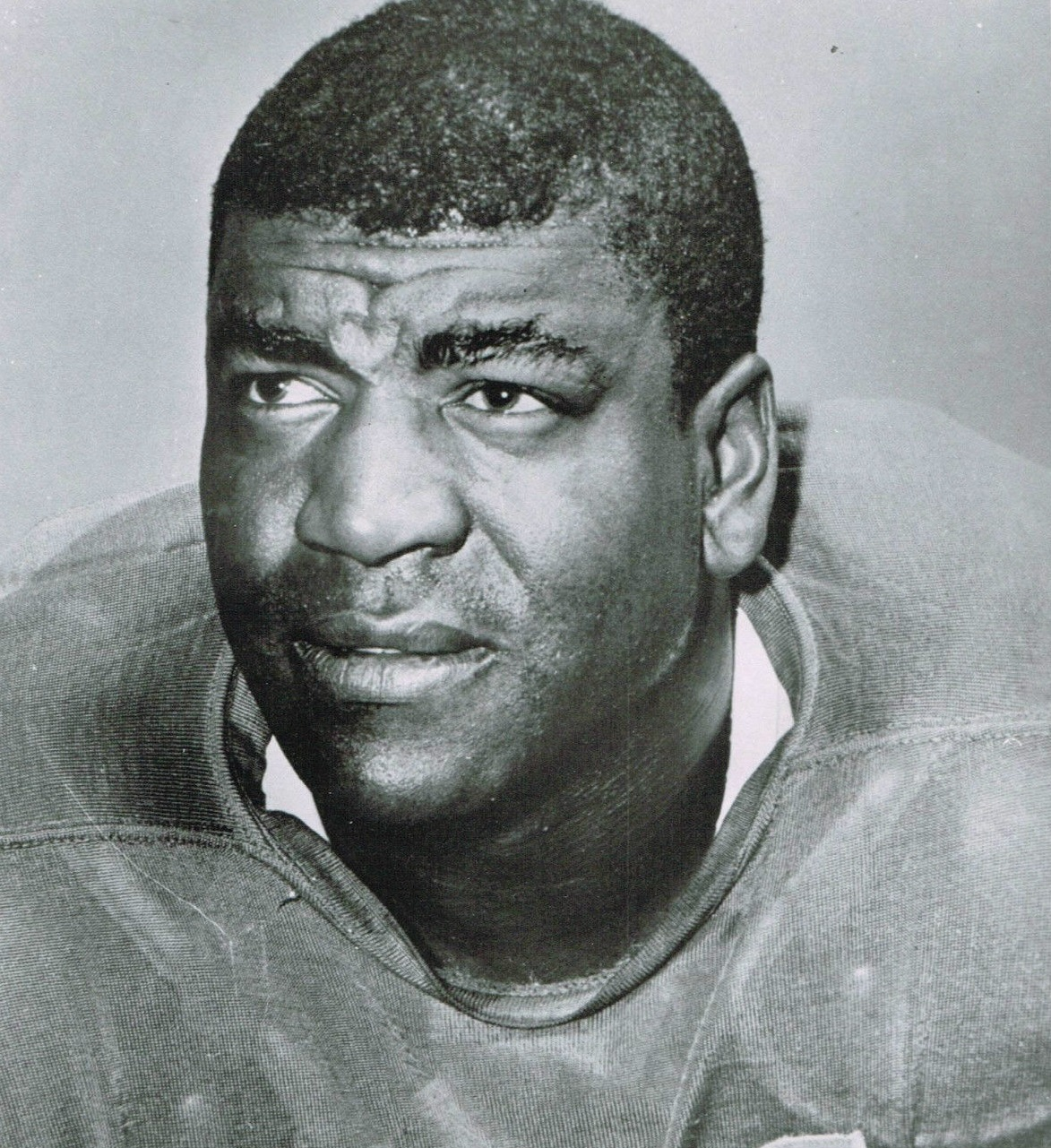
Hall of Fame cornerback Dick "Night Train" Lane started off the 1960s with three consecutive Pro Bowl selections.

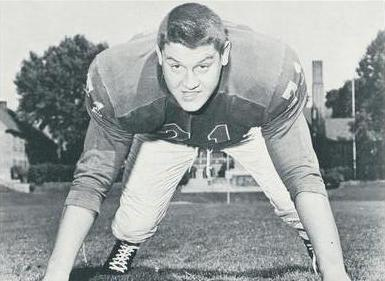
Hall of Fame defensive tackle Alex Karras made the Pro Bowl four times during the 1960s.

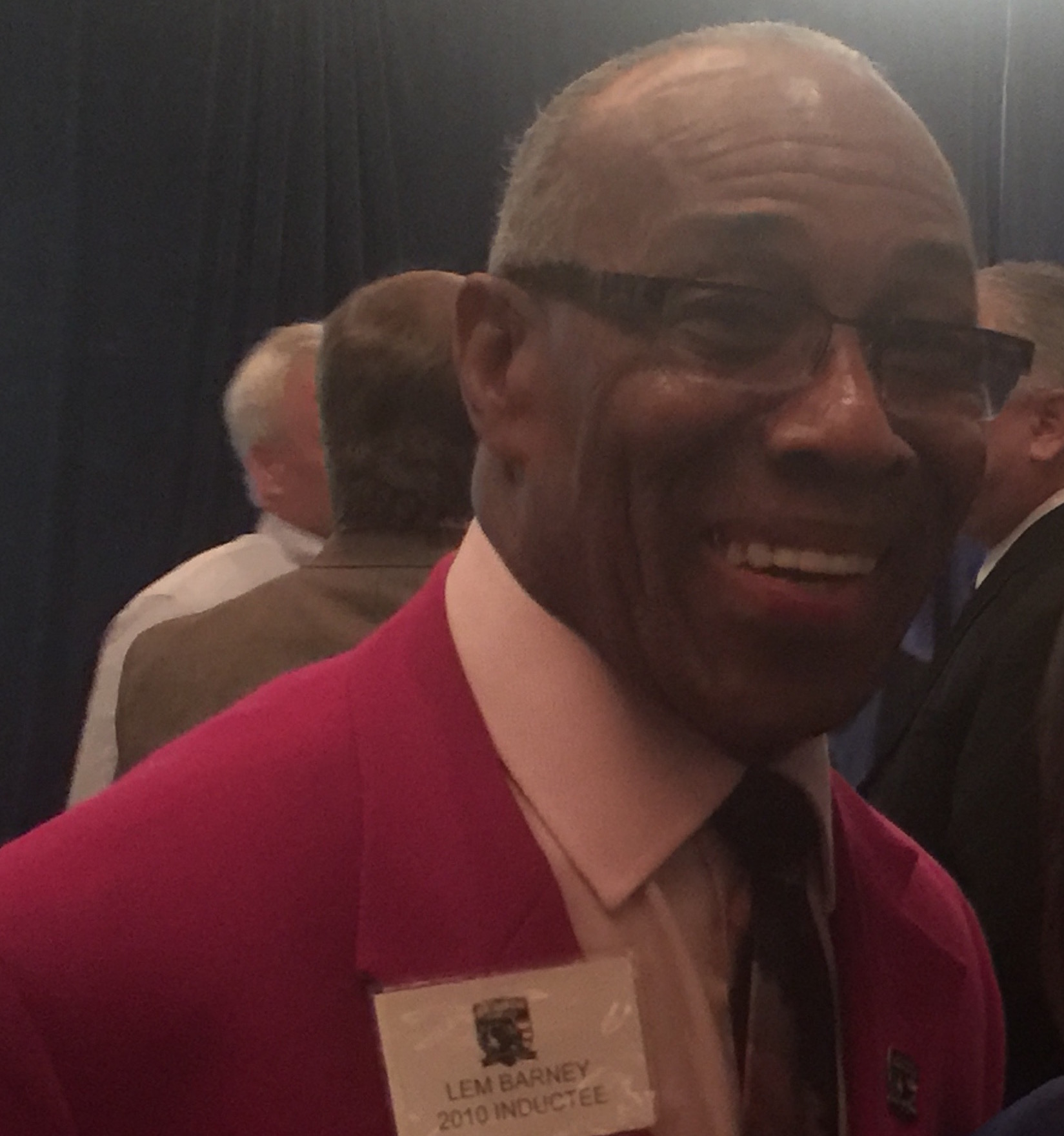
Hall of Fame cornerback and return specialist Lem Barney, pictured here in 2015, was selected to seven Pro Bowls between 1967 and 1976.

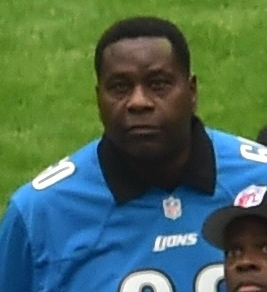
Al Baker, pictured here in 2014, made the Pro Bowl in his rookie season (1978), setting the unofficial single-season sack record in the process. Baker made three straight Pro Bowls to start his career.

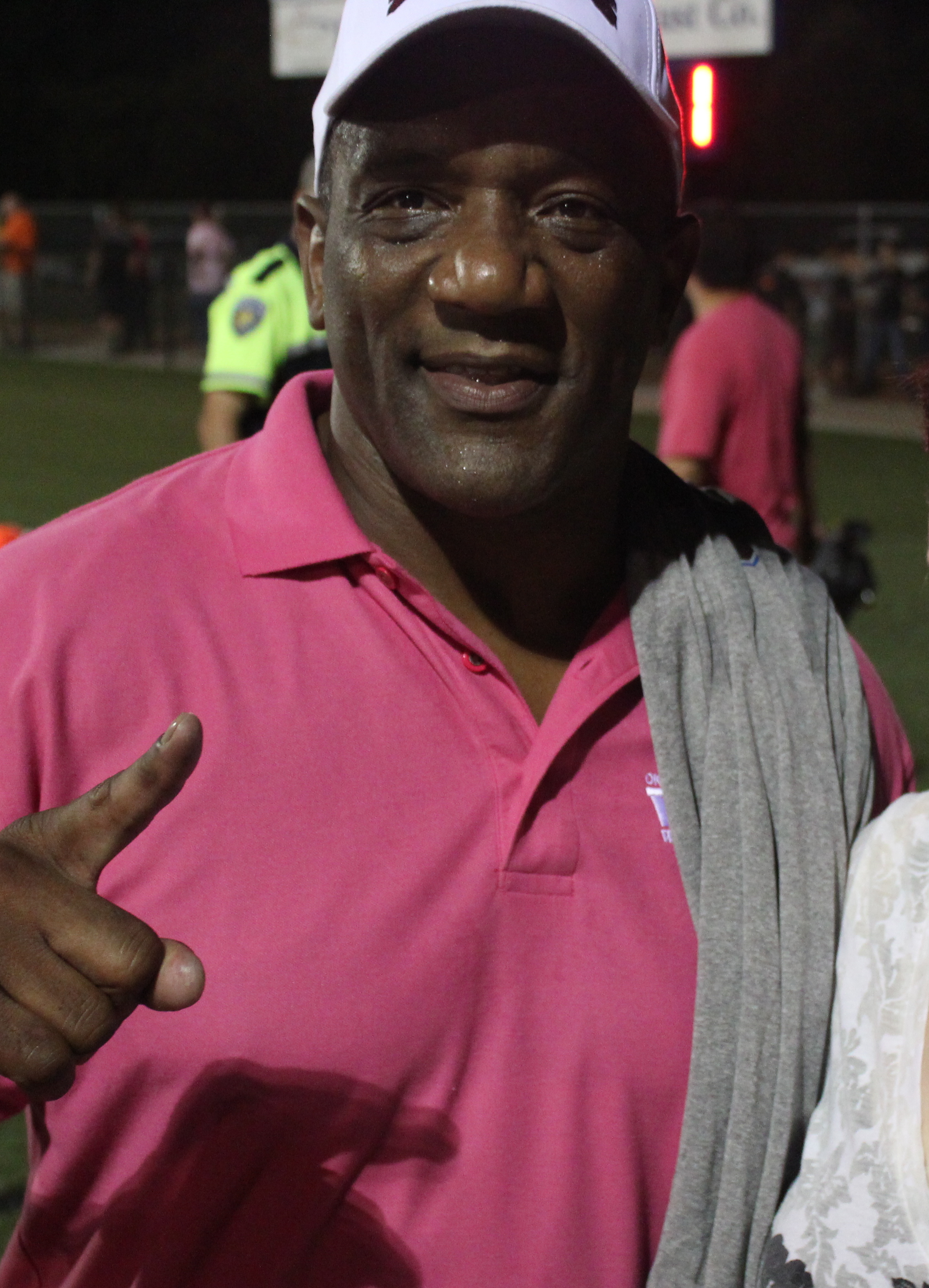
Billy Sims, pictured here in 2010, made three consecutive Pro Bowls in the 1980s.

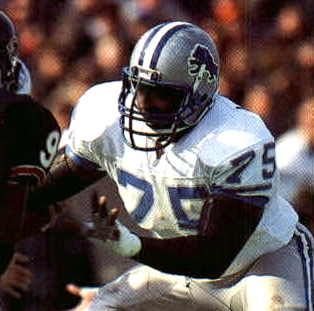
Lomas Brown was selected to six straight Pro Bowls as a Lion during the 1990s.

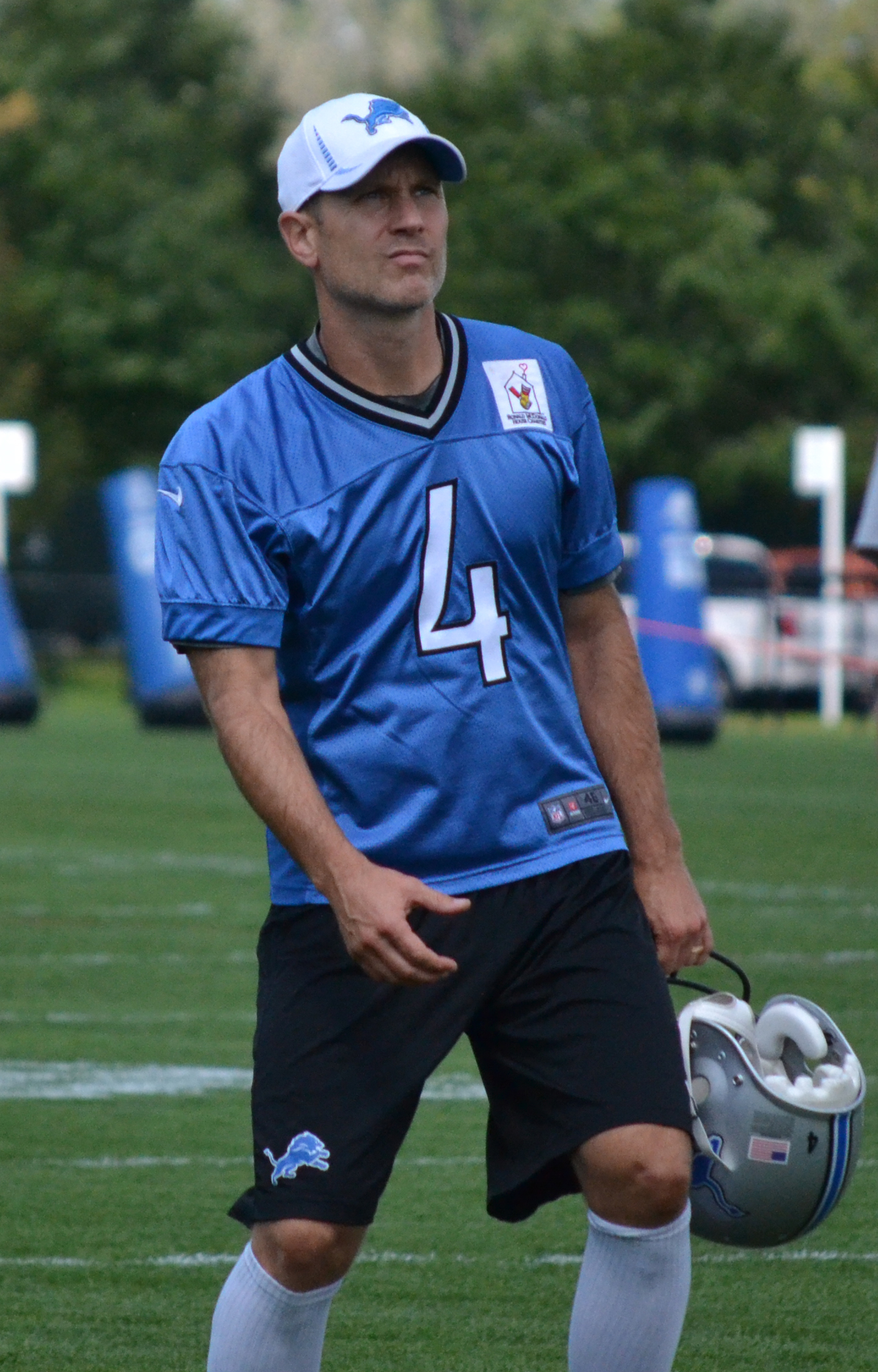
Kicker Jason Hanson made two Pro Bowls with the Lions during the 1990s. He is the team's all-time leader in points scored.

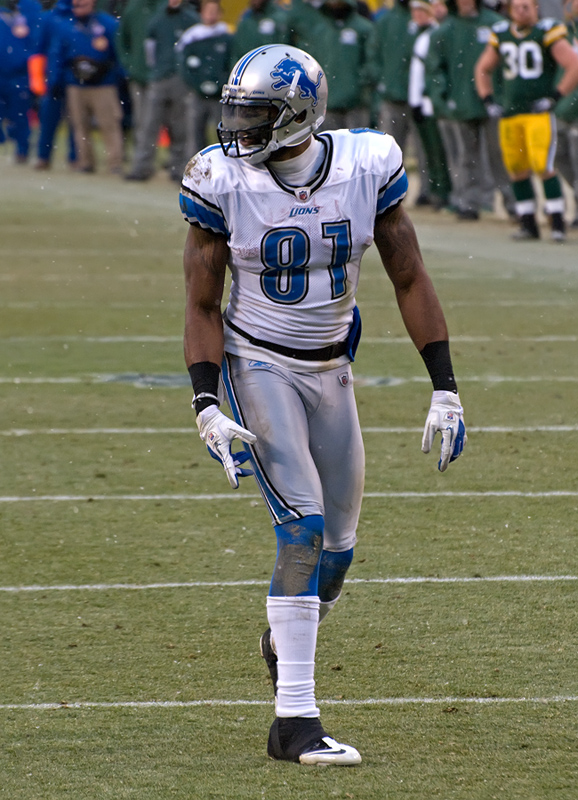
Calvin Johnson, a first-ballot Pro Football Hall of Fame wide receiver, made six consecutive Pro Bowls in the 2010s.

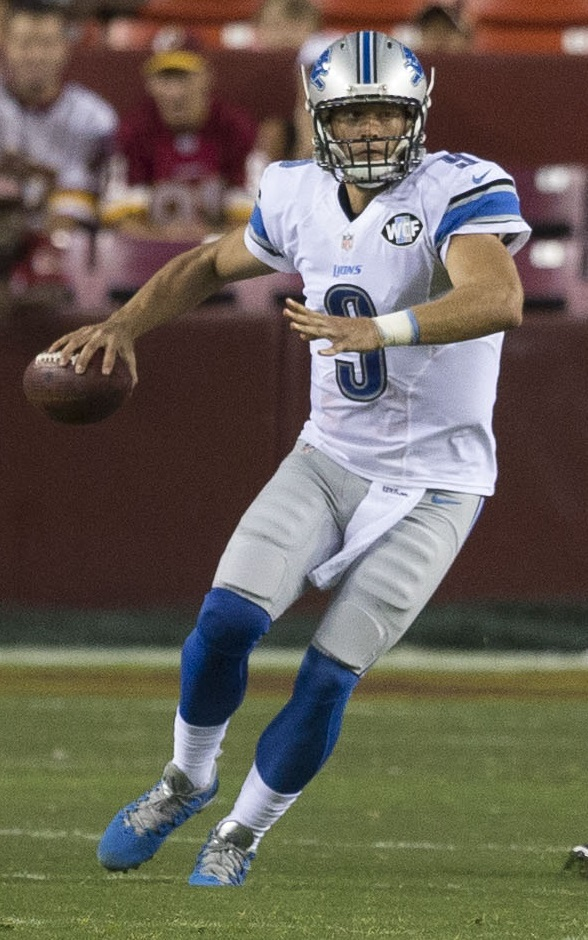
Matthew Stafford was the offensive MVP of the 2015 Pro Bowl.

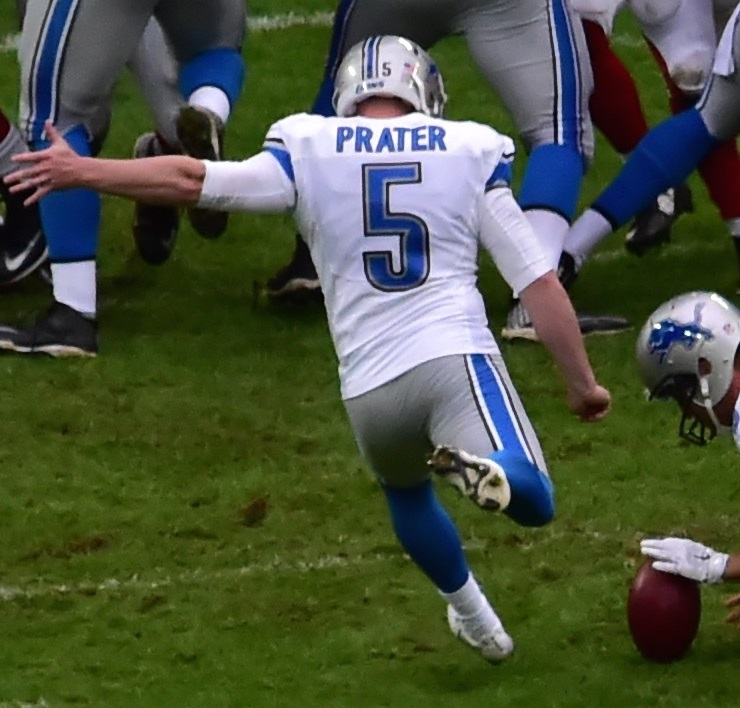
Kicker Matt Prater was selected for the Pro Bowl once with the team and was the Lions' only representative to the 2017 Pro Bowl.

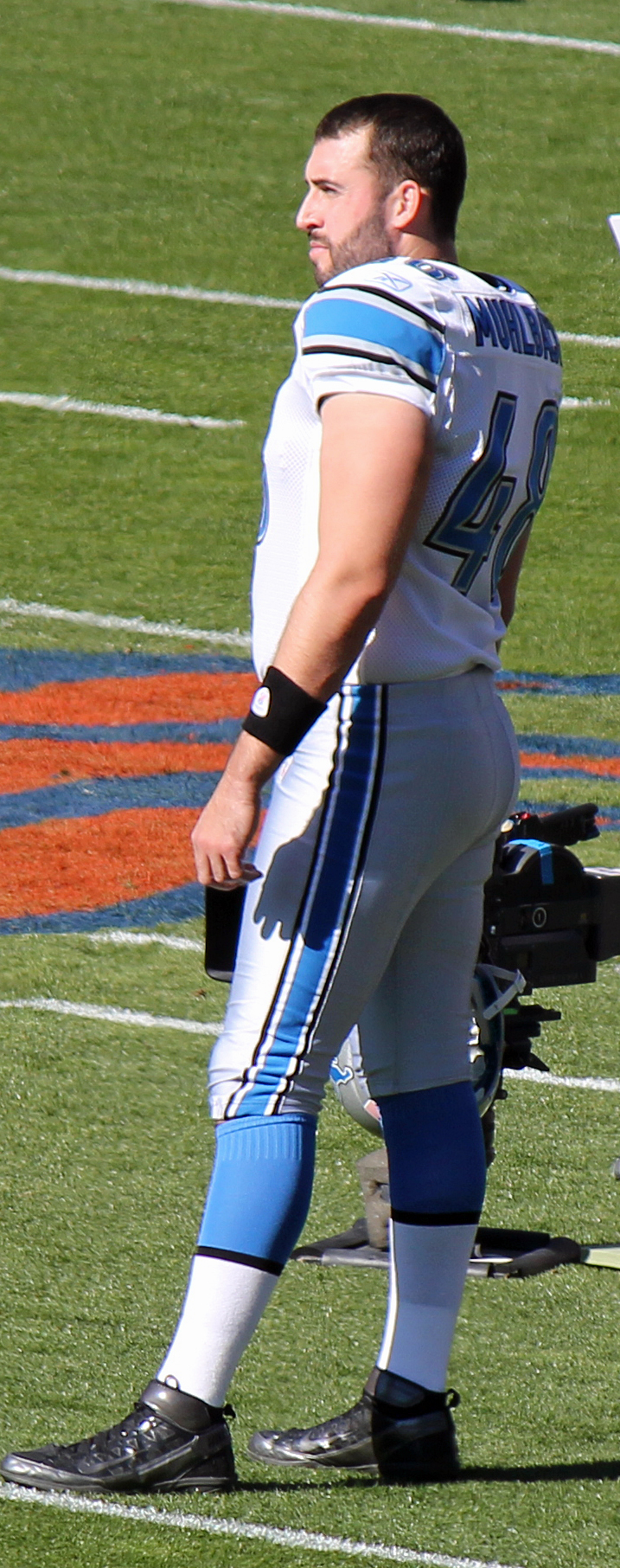
Don Muhlbach is the first and only player in Lions' history to be selected to the Pro Bowl as a long snapper (2013 and 2019).

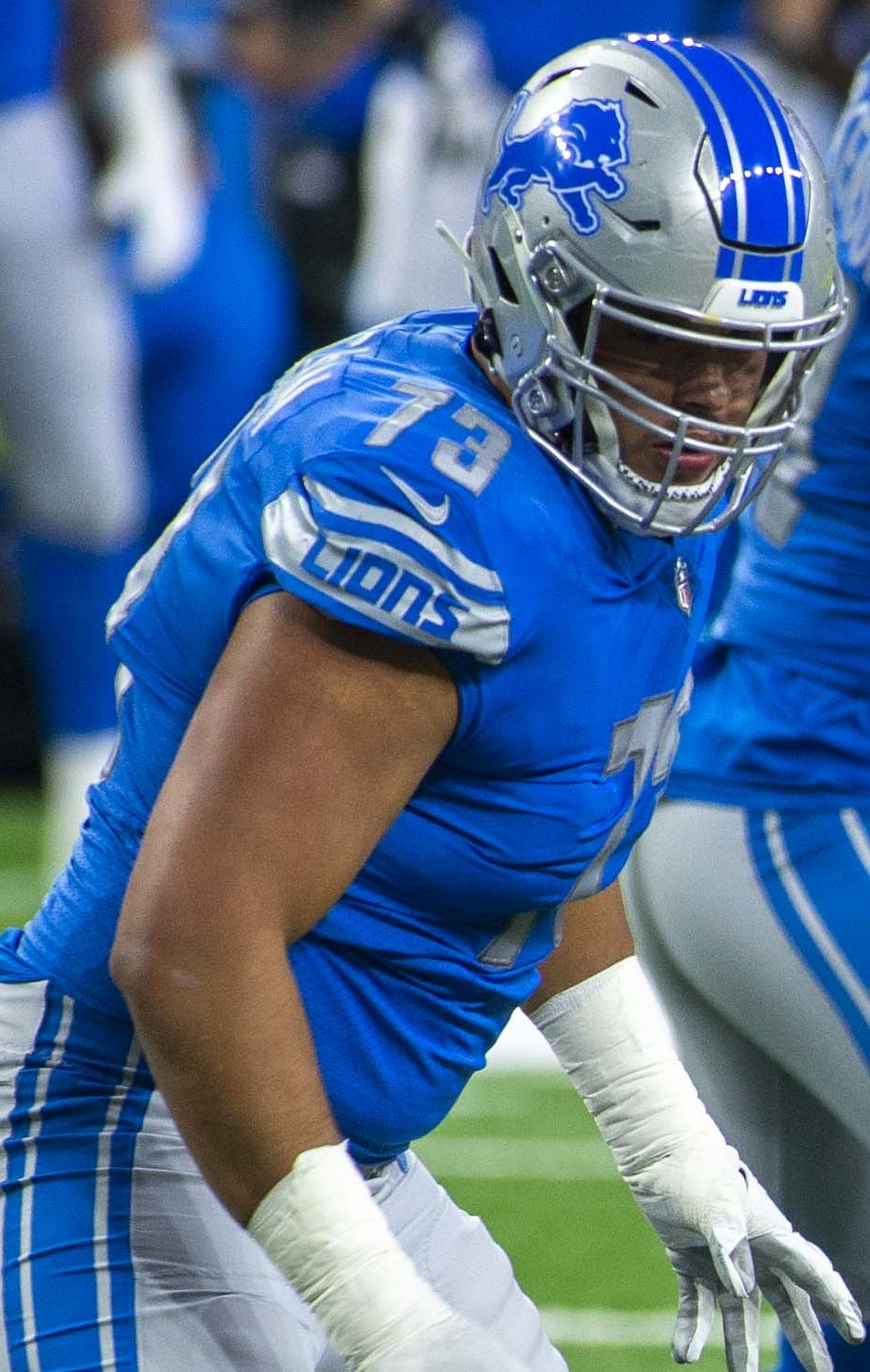
Jonah Jackson was the only Lion selected for the 2022 Pro Bowl.

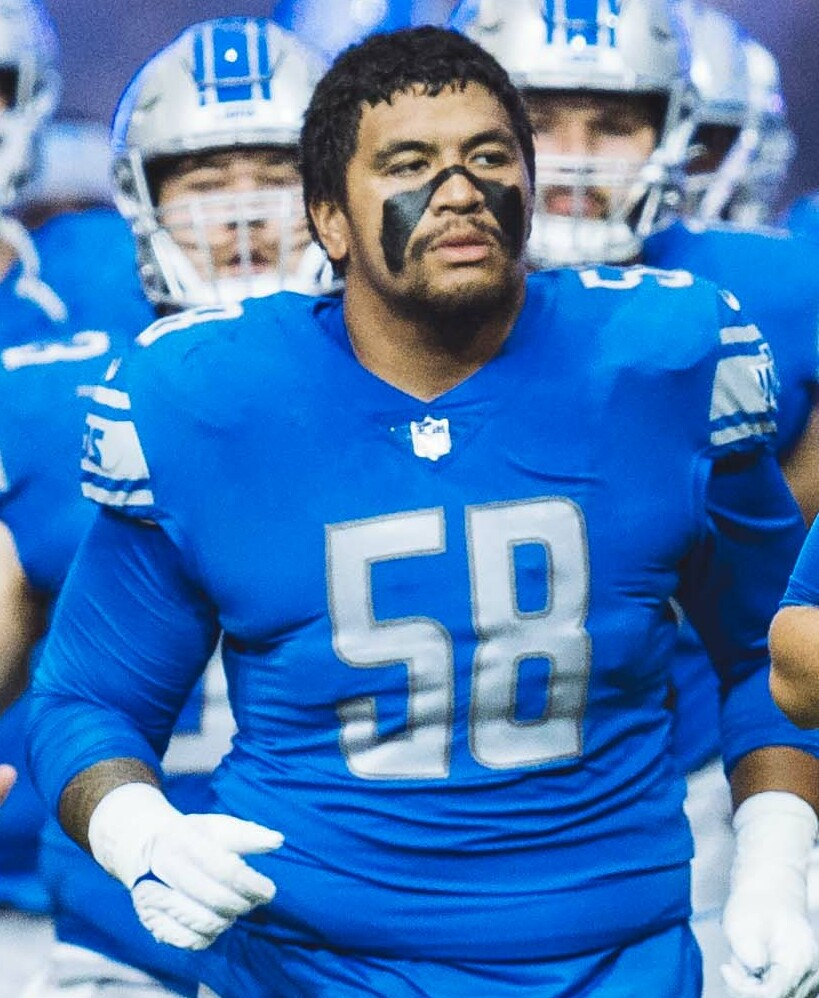
Offensive tackle Penei Sewell made three consecutive Pro Bowls following the 2022–2024 NFL seasons.

Key
*	Selected as Pro Bowl MVP (Note: At different times, the Pro Bowl MVP Award has also been called the "Player of the Game". It has also been handed out to more than one player: in the past it was given to the best back and the best lineman and more recently it is given to the best offensive and defensive players.)
†	Selected as the NFL MVP for that season

Detroit Lions Pro Bowl selections by year
Season	Pro Bowl (Note: The Pro Bowl is held at the end of the season, which typically occurs during the next calendar year. As an example, the 1951 Pro Bowl included Pro Bowl selectees from the 1950 NFL season.)	# of Lions selected	Players (# of Pro Bowls with Lions)	Position (Note: The position which the player was elected to the Pro Bowl for.)	Refs
1950	1951	5	Cloyce Box (1)	End	
1950	1951	5	Lou Creekmur (1)	Guard	
1950	1951	5	Don Doll (1)	Defensive back	
1950	1951	5	Thurman McGraw (1)	Tackle	
1950	1951	5	Doak Walker (1)	Halfback	
1951	1952	7	Les Bingaman (1)	Center	
1951	1952	7	Lou Creekmur (2)	Guard	
1951	1952	7	Don Doll (2)	Safety	
1951	1952	7	Leon Hart (1)	End	
1951	1952	7	Robert Hoernschemeyer (1)	Halfback	
1951	1952	7	Bobby Layne (1)	Quarterback	
1951	1952	7	Doak Walker (2)	Halfback	
1952	1953	7	Cloyce Box (2)	End	
1952	1953	7	Lou Creekmur (3)	Tackle	
1952	1953	7	Don Doll (3) *	Safety	
1952	1953	7	Pat Harder (1)	Fullback	
1952	1953	7	Robert Hoernschemeyer (2)	Halfback	
1952	1953	7	Bobby Layne (2)	Quarterback	
1952	1953	7	Bob Smith (1)	Safety	
1953	1954	7	Les Bingaman (2)	Guard	
1953	1954	7	Jack Christiansen (1)	Safety	
1953	1954	7	Lou Creekmur (4)	Tackle	
1953	1954	7	Yale Lary (1)	Safety	
1953	1954	7	Bobby Layne (3)	Quarterback	
1953	1954	7	Dick Stanfel (1)	Guard	
1953	1954	7	Doak Walker (3)	Halfback	
1954	1955	7	Jack Christiansen (2)	Safety	
1954	1955	7	Lou Creekmur (5)	Tackle	
1954	1955	7	Jim David (1)	Defensive back	
1954	1955	7	Joe Schmidt (1)	Linebacker	
1954	1955	7	Bill Stits (1)	Defensive back	
1954	1955	7	LaVern Torgeson (1)	Linebacker	
1954	1955	7	Doak Walker (4)	Halfback	
1955	1956	6	Jack Christiansen (3)	Safety	
1955	1956	6	Lou Creekmur (6)	Tackle	
1955	1956	6	Jim David (2)	Defensive back	
1955	1956	6	Joe Schmidt (2)	Linebacker	
1955	1956	6	Dick Stanfel (2)	Guard	
1955	1956	6	Doak Walker (5)	Halfback	
1956	1957	7	Charlie Ane Jr. (1)	Center	
1956	1957	7	Jack Christiansen (4)	Safety	
1956	1957	7	Lou Creekmur (7)	Tackle	
1956	1957	7	Jim David (3)	Defensive back	
1956	1957	7	Yale Lary (2)	Safety	
1956	1957	7	Bobby Layne (4)	Quarterback	
1956	1957	7	Joe Schmidt (3)	Linebacker	
1957	1958	7	Jack Christiansen (5)	Safety	
1957	1958	7	Lou Creekmur (8)	Tackle	
1957	1958	7	Jim David (4)	Defensive back	
1957	1958	7	Yale Lary (3)	Safety	
1957	1958	7	Darris McCord (1)	Defensive end	
1957	1958	7	Joe Schmidt (4)	Linebacker	
1957	1958	7	Harley Sewell (1)	Guard	
1958	1959	6	Charlie Ane Jr. (2)	Center	
1958	1959	6	Jim David (5)	Defensive back	
1958	1959	6	Yale Lary (4)	Safety	
1958	1959	6	Bobby Layne (5)	Quarterback (Note: Bobby Layne was traded to the Pittsburgh Steelers part way through the 1958 NFL season.)	
1958	1959	6	Joe Schmidt (5)	Linebacker	
1958	1959	6	Harley Sewell (2)	Guard	
1959	1960	4	Jim David (6)	Defensive back	
1959	1960	4	Yale Lary (5)	Defensive back	
1959	1960	4	Joe Schmidt (6)	Linebacker	
1959	1960	4	Harley Sewell (3)	Guard	
1960	1961	7	Gail Cogdill (1)	End	
1960	1961	7	Jim Gibbons (1)	End	
1960	1961	7	Alex Karras (1)	Defensive tackle	
1960	1961	7	Dick Lane (1)	Cornerback	
1960	1961	7	Yale Lary (6)	Safety	
1960	1961	7	Nick Pietrosante (1)	Fullback	
1960	1961	7	Joe Schmidt (7)	Linebacker	
1961	1962	7	Jim Gibbons (2)	End	
1961	1962	7	Alex Karras (2)	Defensive tackle	
1961	1962	7	Dick Lane (2)	Cornerback	
1961	1962	7	Yale Lary (7)	Safety	
1961	1962	7	Jim Martin (1)	Kicker	
1961	1962	7	Nick Pietrosante (2)	Fullback	
1961	1962	7	Joe Schmidt (8)	Linebacker	
1962	1963	7	Roger Brown (1)	Defensive tackle	
1962	1963	7	Gail Cogdill (2)	End	
1962	1963	7	Alex Karras (3)	Defensive tackle	
1962	1963	7	Dick Lane (3)	Cornerback	
1962	1963	7	Yale Lary (8)	Safety	
1962	1963	7	Joe Schmidt (9)	Linebacker	
1962	1963	7	Harley Sewell (4)	Guard	
1963	1964	6	Terry Barr (1)	End	
1963	1964	6	Roger Brown (2)	Defensive tackle	
1963	1964	6	Gail Cogdill (3)	End	
1963	1964	6	John Gordy (1)	Guard	
1963	1964	6	Joe Schmidt (10)	Linebacker	
1963	1964	6	Wayne Walker (1)	Linebacker	
1964	1965	7	Terry Barr (2) *	End	
1964	1965	7	Roger Brown (3)	Defensive tackle	
1964	1965	7	Jim Gibbons (3)	Tight end	
1964	1965	7	John Gordy (2)	Guard	
1964	1965	7	Yale Lary (9)	Safety	
1964	1965	7	Dick LeBeau (1)	Cornerback	
1964	1965	7	Wayne Walker (2)	Linebacker	
1965	1966	6	Roger Brown (4)	Defensive tackle	
1965	1966	6	John Gordy (3)	Guard	
1965	1966	6	Alex Karras (4)	Defensive tackle	
1965	1966	6	Dick LeBeau (2)	Cornerback	
1965	1966	6	Pat Studstill (1)	End	
1965	1966	6	Wayne Walker (3)	Linebacker	
1966	1967	3	Roger Brown (5)	Defensive tackle	
1966	1967	3	Dick LeBeau (3)	Cornerback	
1966	1967	3	Pat Studstill (2)	End	
1967	1968	2	Lem Barney (1)	Cornerback	
1967	1968	2	Mel Farr (1)	Back	
1968	1969	2	Lem Barney (2)	Cornerback	
1968	1969	2	Charlie Sanders (1)	Tight end	
1969	1970	3	Lem Barney (3)	Cornerback	
1969	1970	3	Ed Flanagan (1)	Center	
1969	1970	3	Charlie Sanders (2)	Tight end	
1970	1971	4	Mel Farr (2)	Running back	
1970	1971	4	Ed Flanagan (2)	Center	
1970	1971	4	Paul Naumoff (1)	Linebacker	
1970	1971	4	Charlie Sanders (3)	Tight end	
1971	1972	5	Ed Flanagan (3)	Center	
1971	1972	5	Greg Landry (1)	Quarterback	
1971	1972	5	Mike Lucci (1)	Linebacker	
1971	1972	5	Steve Owens (1)	Fullback	
1971	1972	5	Charlie Sanders (4)	Tight end	
1972	1973	2	Lem Barney (4)	Cornerback	
1972	1973	2	Rocky Freitas (1)	Tackle	
1973	1974	2	Lem Barney (5)	Cornerback	
1973	1974	2	Ed Flanagan (4)	Center	
1974	1975	2	Dick Jauron (1)	Safety	
1974	1975	2	Charlie Sanders (5)	Tight end	
1975	1976	2	Lem Barney (6)	Cornerback	
1975	1976	2	Charlie Sanders (6)	Tight end	
1976	1977	2	Lem Barney (7)	Cornerback	
1976	1977	2	Charlie Sanders (7)	Tight end	
1977	1978	0	None	N/A	
1978	1979	3	Al Baker (1)	Defensive end	
1978	1979	3	Doug English (1)	Defensive tackle	
1978	1979	3	David Hill (1)	Tight end	
1979	1980	2	Al Baker (2)	Defensive end	
1979	1980	2	David Hill (2)	Tight end	
1980	1981	3	Al Baker (3)	Defensive end	
1980	1981	3	Ed Murray (1) *	Kicker	
1980	1981	3	Billy Sims (1)	Running back	
1981	1982	3	Doug English (2)	Defensive tackle	
1981	1982	3	Billy Sims (2)	Running back	
1981	1982	3	Tom Skladany (1)	Punter	
1982	1983	3	Keith Dorney (1)	Tackle	
1982	1983	3	Doug English (3)	Defensive tackle	
1982	1983	3	Billy Sims (3)	Running back	
1983	1984	1	Doug English (4)	Defensive tackle	
1984	1985	0	None	N/A	
1985	1986	0	None	N/A	
1986	1987	0	None	N/A	
1987	1988	1	Jim Arnold (1)	Punter	
1988	1989	2	Jim Arnold (2)	Punter	
1988	1989	2	Michael Cofer (1)	Linebacker	
1989	1990	4	Jerry Ball (1)	Nose tackle	
1989	1990	4	Ed Murray (2)	Kicker	
1989	1990	4	Barry Sanders (1)	Running back	
1989	1990	4	Chris Spielman (1)	Linebacker	
1990	1991	5	Jerry Ball (2)	Nose tackle	
1990	1991	5	Lomas Brown (1)	Tackle	
1990	1991	5	Mel Gray (1)	Kick returner	
1990	1991	5	Barry Sanders (2)	Running back	
1990	1991	5	Chris Spielman (2)	Linebacker	
1991	1992	6	Jerry Ball (3)	Nose tackle	
1991	1992	6	Bennie Blades (1)	Safety	
1991	1992	6	Lomas Brown (2)	Tackle	
1991	1992	6	Mel Gray (2)	Kick returner	
1991	1992	6	Barry Sanders (3)	Running back	
1991	1992	6	Chris Spielman (3)	Linebacker	
1992	1993	3	Lomas Brown (3)	Tackle	
1992	1993	3	Mel Gray (3)	Kick returner	
1992	1993	3	Barry Sanders (4)	Running back	
1993	1994	3	Lomas Brown (4)	Tackle	
1993	1994	3	Barry Sanders (5)	Running back	
1993	1994	3	Pat Swilling (1)	Linebacker	
1994	1995	5	Lomas Brown (5)	Tackle	
1994	1995	5	Mel Gray (4)	Kick returner	
1994	1995	5	Herman Moore (1)	Wide receiver	
1994	1995	5	Barry Sanders (6)	Running back	
1994	1995	5	Chris Spielman (4)	Linebacker	
1995	1996	4	Lomas Brown (6)	Tackle	
1995	1996	4	Kevin Glover (1)	Center	
1995	1996	4	Herman Moore (2)	Wide receiver	
1995	1996	4	Barry Sanders (7)	Running back	
1996	1997	3	Kevin Glover (2)	Center	
1996	1997	3	Herman Moore (3)	Wide receiver	
1996	1997	3	Barry Sanders (8)	Running back	
1997	1998	5	Kevin Glover (3)	Center	
1997	1998	5	Jason Hanson (1)	Kicker	
1997	1998	5	Herman Moore (4)	Wide receiver	
1997	1998	5	Robert Porcher (1)	Defensive end	
1997	1998	5	Barry Sanders (9) †	Running back	
1998	1999	1	Barry Sanders (10)	Running back	
1999	2000	5	Stephen Boyd (1)	Linebacker	
1999	2000	5	Luther Elliss (1)	Defensive tackle	
1999	2000	5	Jason Hanson (2)	Kicker	
1999	2000	5	Robert Porcher (2)	Defensive end	
1999	2000	5	David Sloan (1)	Tight end	
2000	2001	3	Stephen Boyd (2)	Linebacker	
2000	2001	3	Luther Elliss (2)	Defensive tackle	
2000	2001	3	Desmond Howard (1)	Kick returner	
2001	2002	1	Robert Porcher (3)	Defensive end	
2002	2003	0	None	N/A	
2003	2004	1	Dré Bly (1)	Cornerback	
2004	2005	3	Dré Bly (2)	Cornerback	
2004	2005	3	Eddie Drummond (1)	Kick returner	
2004	2005	3	Shaun Rogers (1)	Defensive tackle	
2005	2006	1	Shaun Rogers (2)	Defensive tackle	
2006	2007	1	Roy Williams (1)	Wide receiver	
2007	2008	0	None	N/A	
2008	2009	0	None	N/A	
2009	2010	0	None	N/A	
2010	2011	2	Calvin Johnson (1)	Wide receiver	
2010	2011	2	Ndamukong Suh (1)	Defensive tackle	
2011	2012	1	Calvin Johnson (2)	Wide receiver	
2012	2013	3	Calvin Johnson (3)	Wide receiver	
2012	2013	3	Don Muhlbach (1)	Long snapper	
2012	2013	3	Ndamukong Suh (2)	Defensive tackle	
2013	2014	2	Calvin Johnson (4)	Wide receiver	
2013	2014	2	Ndamukong Suh (3)	Defensive tackle	
2014	2015	5	Calvin Johnson (5)	Wide receiver	
2014	2015	5	Glover Quin (1)	Safety	
2014	2015	5	Matthew Stafford (1) *	Quarterback	
2014	2015	5	Ndamukong Suh (4)	Defensive tackle	
2014	2015	5	Golden Tate (1)	Wide receiver	
2015	2016	2	Ezekiel Ansah (1)	Defensive end	
2015	2016	2	Calvin Johnson (6)	Wide receiver	
2016	2017	1	Matt Prater (1)	Kicker	
2017	2018	2	T. J. Lang (1)	Guard	
2017	2018	2	Darius Slay (1)	Cornerback	
2018	2019	2	Don Muhlbach (2)	Long snapper	
2018	2019	2	Darius Slay (2)	Cornerback	
2019	2020	2	Kenny Golladay (1)	Wide receiver	
2019	2020	2	Darius Slay (3)	Cornerback	
2020	2021 (Note: The 2021 Pro Bowl was cancelled due to the COVID-19 pandemic.)	3	Jack Fox (1)	Punter	
2020	2021	3	T. J. Hockenson (1)	Tight end	
2020	2021	3	Frank Ragnow (1)	Center	
2021	2022	1	Jonah Jackson (1)	Guard	
2022	2023 (Note: The NFL changed the format for the Pro Bowl; instead of an exhibition full contact game, Pro Bowl selectees competed in various skills competitions and a non-contact flag football game.)	4	Jared Goff (1)	Quarterback	
2022	2023	4	Frank Ragnow (2)	Center	
2022	2023	4	Penei Sewell (1)	Tackle	
2022	2023	4	Amon-Ra St. Brown (1)	Wide receiver	
2023	2024	7	Jahmyr Gibbs (1)	Running back	
2023	2024	7	Aidan Hutchinson (1)	Defensive end	
2023	2024	7	Sam LaPorta (1)	Tight end	
2023	2024	7	Frank Ragnow (3)	Center	
2023	2024	7	Jalen Reeves-Maybin (1)	Special teams	
2023	2024	7	Penei Sewell (2)	Tackle	
2023	2024	7	Amon-Ra St. Brown (2)	Wide receiver	
2024	2025	8	Brian Branch (1)	Safety	
2024	2025	8	Taylor Decker (1)	Tackle	
2024	2025	8	Jack Fox (2)	Punter	
2024	2025	8	Jahmyr Gibbs (2)	Running back	
2024	2025	8	Jared Goff (2) *	Quarterback	
2024	2025	8	Frank Ragnow (4)	Center	
2024	2025	8	Penei Sewell (3)	Tackle	
2024	2025	8	Amon-Ra St. Brown (3)	Wide receiver	

== Most Pro Bowl selections ==
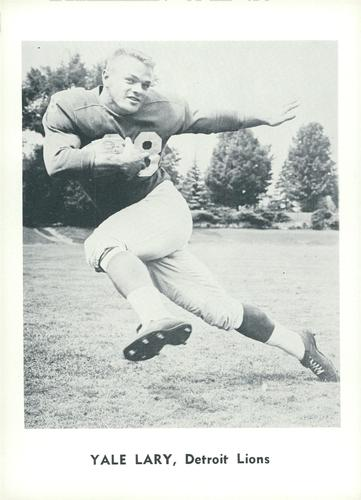
Yale Lary, in the offseason after being selected to the 1954 Pro Bowl, was ordered to report for duty in the United States Army. After completing his service, which forced him to miss the 1954 and 1955 seasons, Lary returned to the NFL and was selected for eight more Pro Bowls.

Detroit Lions players with the most Pro Bowl selections while part of the team
Count	Player	Position	Selections	Refs
10	Barry Sanders	Running back	1989–1998	
10	Joe Schmidt	Linebacker	1954–1963	
9	Yale Lary	Safety/defensive back	1953, 1956–1962, 1964	
8	Lou Creekmur	Tackle/guard	1950–1957	
7	Lem Barney	Cornerback	1967–1969, 1972, 1973, 1975, 1976	
7	Charlie Sanders	Tight end	1968–1971, 1974–1976	
6	Lomas Brown	Tackle	1990–1995	
6	Jim David	Defensive back	1954–1959	
6	Calvin Johnson	Wide receiver	2010–2015	
5	Roger Brown	Defensive tackle	1962–1966	
5	Jack Christiansen	Safety	1953–1957	
5	Bobby Layne	Quarterback	1951–1953, 1956, 1958	
5	Doak Walker	Halfback	1950, 1951, 1953–1955	
