= Lists of Detroit Lions players =

The Detroit Lions are a professional American football team based in Detroit, Michigan. The Lions compete in the National Football League (NFL) as a member of the North Division of the National Football Conference. The franchise was founded in Portsmouth, Ohio, as the Portsmouth Spartans and joined the NFL on July 12, 1930. After being purchased by George A. Richards in 1934, the franchise was relocated to Detroit and renamed to the Detroit Lions in reference to the city's Major League Baseball franchise, the Detroit Tigers. The team plays its home games at Ford Field in Downtown Detroit.

Since their founding, hundreds of players have played at least one game for the team. Many, but not all of these players were selected by the Lions in the NFL draft, which began in 1936. To honor their contributions to the team, the Lions have recognized their own players in various ways, including retiring uniform numbers and establishing a team hall of fame. Additionally, Lions' players have been recognized nationally for their performance, most notably through induction into the Pro Football Hall of Fame. Lions' players have also been selected for the Pro Bowl and named to numerous "All-Time Teams". The following lists provide an overview of notable groupings of Detroit Lions players.

== Current and all-time rosters ==
- Detroit Lions roster – the team's active roster and practice squad, typically composed of 53 and 16 players, respectively.
- Detroit Lions all-time roster (A–Las) – the team's all-time roster with last names starting with "A" through "Las", composed of any player who has participated in at least one regular season or postseason game (preseason games do not apply).
- Detroit Lions all-time roster (Lat–Z) – the team's all-time roster with last names starting with "Lat" through "Z", composed of any player who has participated in at least one regular season or postseason game (preseason games do not apply).
  - List of Detroit Lions starting quarterbacks – a list of quarterbacks who have started at least one game for the team since 1950.

== Draft choices ==
- Detroit Lions draft history – overview of every draft the team has participated in since the inaugural draft in 1936.
  - Detroit Lions draft picks (1936–1969) – a list of every draft selection by the team from 1936 to 1969.
  - Detroit Lions draft picks (1970–present) – a list of every draft selection by the team from 1970 to the present.
  - List of Detroit Lions first-round draft picks – a list of every first-round draft selection by the team.

== Team recognition ==
- List of Detroit Lions retired numbers – a list of every uniform number retired by the team.
- Pride of the Lions – the team's hall of fame, which includes a list of all inductees.

== League recognition ==
- List of Detroit Lions in the Pro Football Hall of Fame – a list of inductees into the Pro Football Hall of Fame who played for the team.
- List of Detroit Lions Pro Bowl selections – a list of players selected to the Pro Bowl while on the team.
- List of Detroit Lions NFL All-Decade Team selections – a list of players who were part of the team and selected for an NFL All-Decade Team.

== See also ==
- Category:Detroit Lions players
- Lists of American football players
