= List of Detroit Lions NFL All-Decade Team selections =

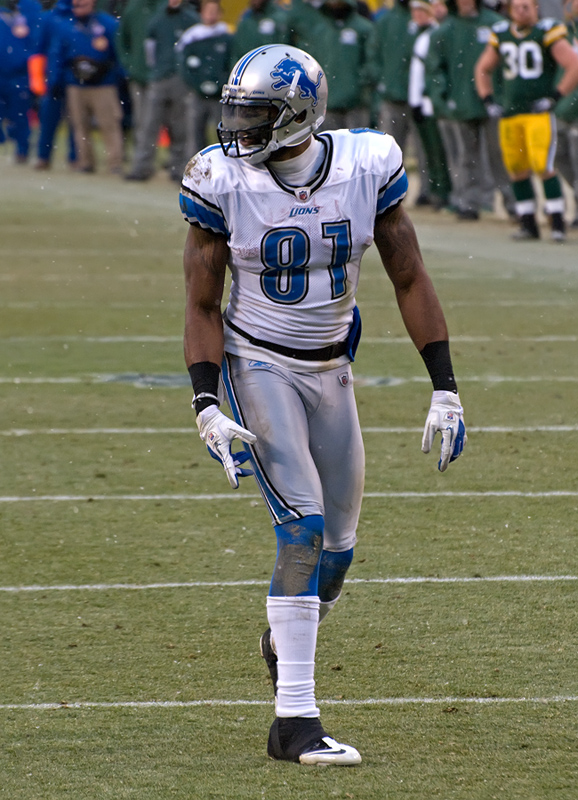
Wide receiver Calvin Johnson was one of two selections to the 2010s All-Decade Team.

The Detroit Lions are a professional American football team based in Detroit, Michigan. The Lions compete in the National Football League (NFL) as a member of the North Division of the National Football Conference (NFC). The franchise was founded in Portsmouth, Ohio, as the Portsmouth Spartans and joined the NFL on July 12, 1930. After being purchased by George A. Richards in 1934, the franchise was relocated to Detroit and renamed to the Detroit Lions in reference to the city's Major League Baseball franchise, the Detroit Tigers. The team plays its home games at Ford Field in Downtown Detroit.

In 1969, in recognition of the 50th anniversary of the NFL, the Pro Football Hall of Fame identified NFL All-Decade Teams for the first four decades of the history of the league (1920s, 1930s, 1940s and 1950s). Players were selected based solely on their performance during the specified decade, with accomplishments before or after not considered. After each subsequent decade, a new team was identified, with the most recent being selected for the 2010s. Each team has been selected by the Pro Football Hall of Fame Selection Committee, which is primarily made up of national sportswriters. The Selection Committee is asked to select specific numbers of typical American football positions to construct the team.

From the 1920s to the 2000s, each team was split into first-team and second-team selections, whereas the 2010s Team did not make this distinction. While standard offensive, defensive, and special teams positions have always been included, the position names, types of positions, and the number of positions have changed from decade to decade. For example, due to its greatly reduced usage, the fullback position was not included for the 2010s team and a new "flex" offensive position was added instead.

The Lions have had 23 players named to All-Decade Teams, with at least one player named to all but the 2000s Team. The 1950s Team included eight Lions players, the most the Lions have had selected to one All-Decade Team. Of the 23 Lions named to All-Decade teams, 16 have been inducted into the Pro Football Hall of Fame and 13 have been inducted into the Pride of the Lions, a permanent display at Ford Field meant to honor the team's greatest players. The Lions' most recent selections were Calvin Johnson and Ndamukong Suh as part of the 2010s Team.

== Team selections ==
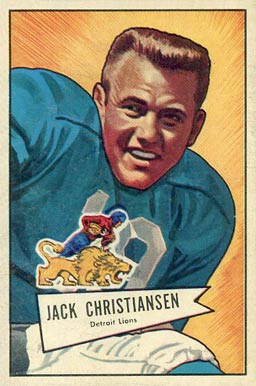
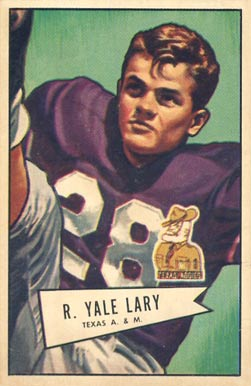
Hall of Fame safeties Jack Christiansen and Yale Lary played five seasons together during the 1950s and both made the 1950s Team.

Key
Symbol	Meaning
†	Inducted into the Pro Football Hall of Fame
‡	Inducted into the Pride of the Lions and Pro Football Hall of Fame

Detroit Lions NFL All-Decade Team selections
All-Decade Team	# of Lions selected	Player	Position (Note: Corresponds to the position identified in each All-Decade Team.)	Years with Lions	Refs
1930s	3	George Christensen	Tackle	1931–1938	
1930s	3	Dutch Clark ‡	Quarterback	1931–1932, 1934–1938	
1930s	3	Ox Emerson	Guard	1931–1937	
1940s	4	Bill Dudley †	Halfback	1947–1949	
1940s	4	Pat Harder	Fullback	1951–1953	
1940s	4	Byron White	Halfback	1940–1941	
1940s	4	Alex Wojciechowicz ‡	Center	1938–1946	
1950s	8	Jack Christiansen ‡	Safety	1951–1958	
1950s	8	Dick Lane ‡	Cornerback	1960–1965	
1950s	8	Yale Lary ‡	Safety	1952–1953, 1956–1964	
1950s	8	Bobby Layne ‡	Quarterback	1950–1958	
1950s	8	Ollie Matson †	Running back	1963	
1950s	8	Hugh McElhenny †	Running back	1964	
1950s	8	Joe Schmidt ‡	Linebacker	1953–1965	
1950s	8	Dick Stanfel ‡	Guard	1952–1955	
1960s	2	Lem Barney ‡	Cornerback	1967–1977	
1960s	2	Alex Karras ‡	Defensive tackle	1958–1962, 1964–1970	
1970s	1	Charlie Sanders ‡	Tight end	1968–1977	
1980s	1	Eddie Murray	Kicker	1980–1991	
1990s	2	Mel Gray	Kick returner	1989–1994	
1990s	2	Mel Gray	Punt returner	1989–1994	
1990s	2	Barry Sanders ‡	Running back	1989–1998	
2000s	0	—N/a	—N/a	—N/a	
2010s	2	Calvin Johnson ‡	Wide receiver	2007–2015	
2010s	2	Ndamukong Suh	Defensive tackle	2010–2014	

== See also ==
- NFL 50th Anniversary All-Time Team
- NFL 75th Anniversary All-Time Team
- NFL 100th Anniversary All-Time Team
