= List of Detroit Lions in the Pro Football Hall of Fame =

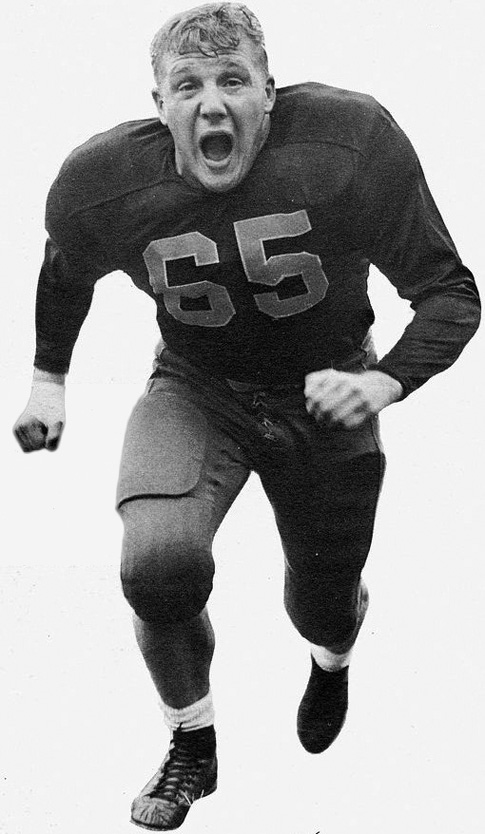
Joe Schmidt, a linebacker and former head coach for the Lions

The Detroit Lions are a professional American football team based in Detroit, Michigan. The Lions compete in the National Football League (NFL) as a member of the North Division of the National Football Conference. The franchise was founded in Portsmouth, Ohio, as the Portsmouth Spartans and joined the NFL on July 12, 1930, making them the fifth oldest franchise in the league. After being purchased by George A. Richards in 1934, the franchise was relocated to Detroit and renamed to the Detroit Lions in reference to the city's Major League Baseball franchise, the Detroit Tigers.

In 1963, the Pro Football Hall of Fame was created to honor the history of professional American football and the individuals who have greatly influenced it. Since the charter induction class of 1963, 23 individuals who have played, coached, or held an administrative position for the Lions have been inducted into the Pro Football Hall of Fame.

Of the 23 inductees, 17 made their primary contribution to football with the Lions, while the other 6 contributed only a minor portion of their career with the Lions. Dwight Freeney was the most recent Lion selected to the Hall of Fame as part of the 2024 class.

== Inductees ==
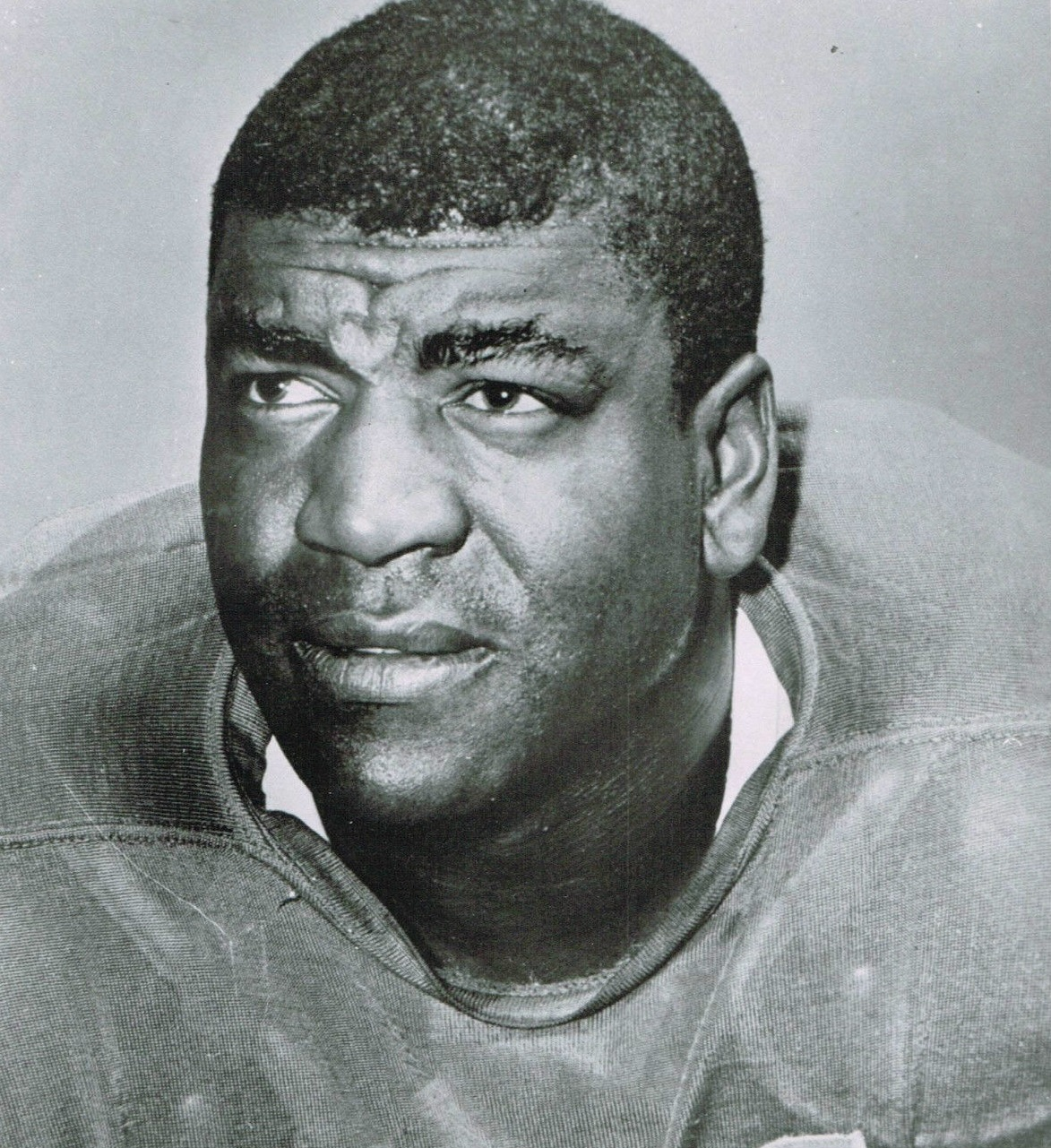
Dick "Night Train" Lane, a defensive back who played six seasons for the Lions

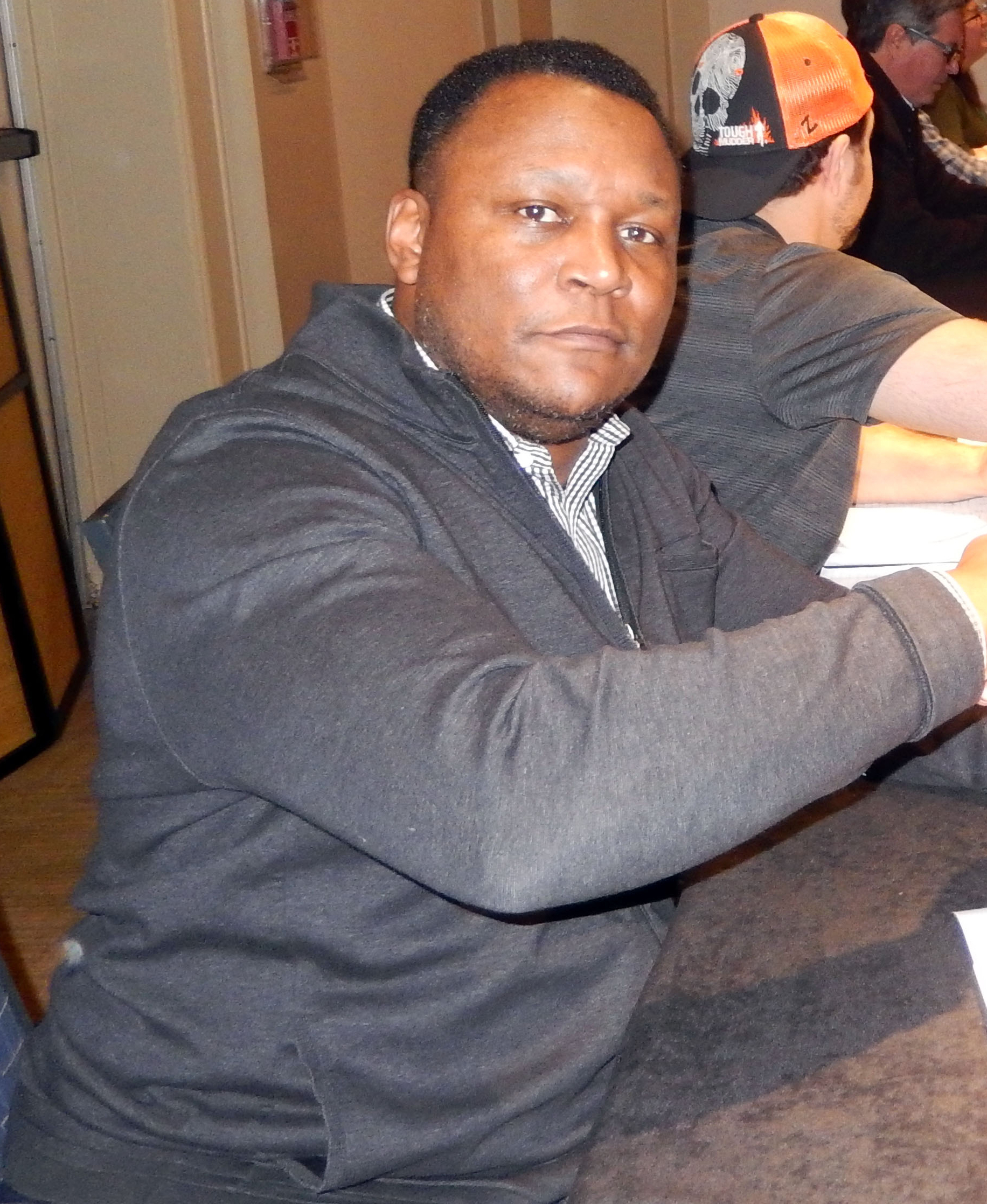
Barry Sanders, a running back who played ten seasons for the Lions

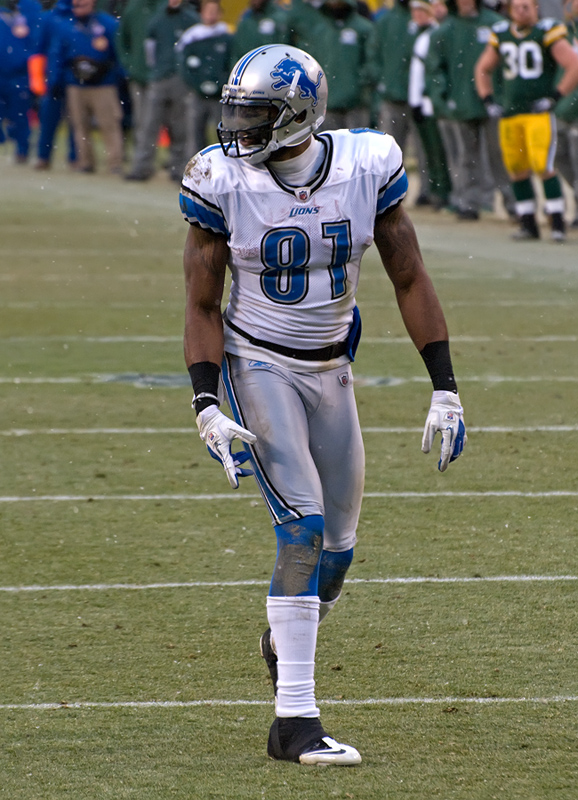
Calvin Johnson, wide receiver who played nine seasons for the Lions

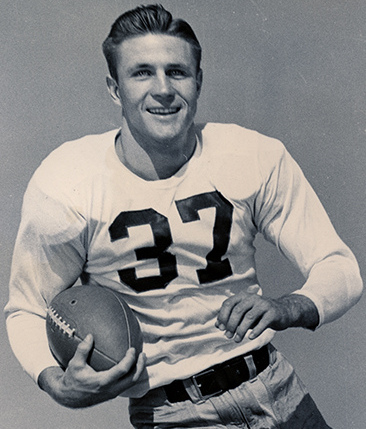
Doak Walker, a halfback and kicker who played six seasons for the Lions

Detroit Lions in the Pro Football Hall of Fame
Class	Inductee	Position(s)	Seasons with the Lions	Career accomplishments				
Class	Inductee	Position(s)	Seasons with the Lions	All-Pros		Pro Bowls (Note: Includes all selections to the NFL All-Star team (1939–1942), the Pro Bowl (1951–present), and the AFL All-Star game (1961–1969).)	Awards	Refs
Class	Inductee	Position(s)	Seasons with the Lions	First-team	Second-team	Pro Bowls	Awards	Refs
1963	Dutch Clark	Quarterback	1931–1932; 1934–1938	6	0	0	1930s All-Decade Team; 100th Anniversary All-Time Team	
1963	Dutch Clark	General manager	1936–1938	N/A	N/A	N/A	1930s All-Decade Team; 100th Anniversary All-Time Team	
1963	Dutch Clark	Head coach	1937–1938	N/A	N/A	N/A	1930s All-Decade Team; 100th Anniversary All-Time Team	
1966	Bill Dudley	Halfback	1947–1949	4	2	2	1× MVP (1946); 1940s All-Decade Team	
1967	Bobby Layne	Quarterback	1950–1958	2	4	6	1950s All-Decade Team	
1968	Alex Wojciechowicz	Center; Linebacker	1938–1946	2	0	0	1940s All-Decade Team	
1970	Jack Christiansen	Defensive back	1951–1958	6	0	5	1950s All-Decade Team	
1970	Hugh McElhenny	Halfback	1964	5	0	6	1950s All-Decade Team; 100th Anniversary All-Time Team	
1972	Ollie Matson	Running back	1963	7	0	6	1950s All-Decade Team	
1973	Joe Schmidt	Linebacker	1953–1965	8	2	10	1950s All-Decade Team; 100th Anniversary All-Time Team	
1973	Joe Schmidt	Coach	1966–1972	N/A	N/A	N/A	1950s All-Decade Team; 100th Anniversary All-Time Team	
1974	Dick Lane	Cornerback	1960–1965	7	0	7	1950s All-Decade Team; 50th Anniversary All-Time Team; 75th Anniversary All-Time Team; 100th Anniversary All-Time Team	
1979	Yale Lary	Defensive back Punter	1952–1953; 1956–1964	3	2	9	1950s All-Decade Team	
1985	Frank Gatski	Center	1957	4	0	1		
1986	Doak Walker	Halfback; Kicker	1950–1955	4	0	5		
1987	John Henry Johnson	Fullback	1957–1959	0	2	4		
1992	Lem Barney	Defensive back	1967–1977	2	0	7	1× DROY (1967); 1960s All-Decade Team	
1996	Lou Creekmur	Offensive lineman	1950–1959	7	0	8		
2004	Barry Sanders	Running back	1989–1998	6	4	10	1× MVP (1997); 2× OPOY (1994, 1997); 1× OROY (1989); 1990s All-Decade Team; 100th Anniversary All-Time Team	
2007	Charlie Sanders	Tight end	1968–1977	3	0	7	1970s All-Decade Team	
2010	Dick LeBeau	Defensive back	1959–1972	0	3	3		
2013	Curley Culp	Defensive tackle	1980–1981	1	4	6	1× DPOY (1975)	
2016	Dick Stanfel	Guard	1952–1955	5	0	5	1950s All-Decade Team	
2020	Alex Karras	Defensive tackle	1958–1970	3	6	4	1960s All-Decade Team	
2021	Calvin Johnson	Wide receiver	2007–2015	3	1	6	2010s All-Decade Team	
2024	Dwight Freeney	Defensive end	2017	3	1	7	2000s All-Decade Team	

== See also ==
- History of the Detroit Lions
- Portsmouth Spartans
