= Hopelawn, New Jersey =

Populated place in Middlesex County, New Jersey, US

- Census-designated place
- Location in Middlesex County Location in New Jersey Location in the United States
- Coordinates: 40°31′37″N 74°17′35″W
- Country: United States
- State: New Jersey
- County: Middlesex
- Township: Woodbridge
- Named for: Luther M. Hope

Area
  - Total: 0.44 sq mi (1.13 km^{2})
  - Land: 0.44 sq mi (1.13 km^{2})
  - Water: 0 sq mi (0.00 km^{2})
- Elevation: 98 ft (30 m)

Population (2020)
  - Total: 2,603
  - Density: 5,957.3/sq mi (2,300.11/km^{2})
- ZIP Code: 08861
- FIPS code: 34-33090
- GNIS feature ID: 0877243

Hopelawn is an unincorporated community and census-designated place (CDP) in Woodbridge Township, Middlesex County, New Jersey, United States. As of the 2020 United States census, the population of the CDP was 2,603.

== History ==
Hopelawn was the homestead and farm of Luther M. Hope in the 19th century. After its establishment, the original streets were named after Hope's children (Juliette, Loretta, May, Luther, Lee, Warren, James, Howard, Clyde, John, Ellen, Charles, Herbert, Erin, Emmitt, William). Originally called "Hope's Lawn", it was later shortened to Hopelawn.

Luther Martin Hope was born at Modestown, Virginia, June 9, 1839, and came as a young man to Brooklyn, New York, and then to Perth Amboy, New Jersey. For many years he carried on a mercantile business in Perth Amboy, but during the latter years of his life retired and made his home on what was then known as the old Billy Watson farm, now "Hopelawn", on the outskirts of Perth Amboy, his death occurring there January 25, 1907.

Hopelawn was originally two communities: Ellendale Terrace from May Street south to New Brunswick Avenue, and Hopelawn from May Street north to West Pond Road, including sections such as Washington Heights, the area of Pennsylvania Avenue and Garden State Parkway and Florida Grove along Florida Grove Road from West Pond Road to Lee Street.

Hopelawn was known for its abundance of high quality clay. The Such Clay Company and the McHose Clay Company extracted clay from the area south of New Brunswick Avenue, west of Florida Grove Road, from Hopelawn to Keasbey. This area was referred to as "the Clay Banks". The Clay Banks contained several "Old Fashion Swimming Holes" and "Fishing Ponds" as well as the only baseball field in town until the baseball field next to #10 School was built in the late 1940s.

There were two sets of railroad tracks that crossed the Hopelawn Clay Banks, east to west. The rail line originated in Pennsylvania and terminated in Perth Amboy and was operated by the Lehigh Valley Railroad. The right-of-way has become part of the Middlesex Greenway.

In the late 1930s and 1940s, Hopelawn was the home of a semi-pro football team known as the Hopelawn Greyhounds. Opponents included the Woodbridge Golden Bears. The team disbanded because of World War II. After the war many of the Greyhound (Maroon and Grey) players joined and went on to star with the Golden Bears (Gold and Black), owned and coached by Tony Caceola.

Mary C. Fee, teacher and school principal, served the residents of Hopelawn from 1919 to 1969 at the community's only school, Elementary School #10. After her retirement a street was named in her honor, Mary C. Fee Lane, adjacent to the school. The school is no longer in operation. A library in the basement of the building remained until the property was purchased and sold in the 1990s. The building is now a church.

== Geography ==
Hopelawn is in northeastern Middlesex County, in southern Woodbridge Township, although it uses the same ZIP Code, 08861, as the city of Perth Amboy, which borders Hopelawn to the east. Hopelawn is bordered to the south by Keasbey, to the west by Fords, and to the north by central Woodbridge. The Garden State Parkway and U.S. Route 9 run along the western edge of the community, while the New Jersey Route 440 expressway cuts through the southeast corner, leading east into Staten Island, New York.

According to the U.S. Census Bureau, the Hopelawn CDP has an area of 0.437 square miles (1.132 km^{2}), all land.

== Demographics ==
Historical population
Census	Pop.	Note	%±
2020	2,603		—
U.S. Decennial Census; 2020

Hopelawn was first listed as a census designated place in the 2020 U.S. census.

=== 2020 census ===
As of the 2020 census, Hopelawn had a population of 2,603. The median age was 39.9 years. 22.1% of residents were under the age of 18 and 15.4% of residents were 65 years of age or older. For every 100 females there were 88.1 males, and for every 100 females age 18 and over there were 86.2 males age 18 and over.

100.0% of residents lived in urban areas, while 0.0% lived in rural areas.

There were 863 households in Hopelawn, of which 33.6% had children under the age of 18 living in them. Of all households, 46.8% were married-couple households, 14.7% were households with a male householder and no spouse or partner present, and 29.3% were households with a female householder and no spouse or partner present. About 21.3% of all households were made up of individuals and 11.3% had someone living alone who was 65 years of age or older.

There were 901 housing units, of which 4.2% were vacant. The homeowner vacancy rate was 0.8% and the rental vacancy rate was 6.1%.

Hopelawn CDP, New Jersey – Racial and ethnic composition Note: the US Census treats Hispanic/Latino as an ethnic category. This table excludes Latinos from the racial categories and assigns them to a separate category. Hispanics/Latinos may be of any race.
Race / Ethnicity (NH = Non-Hispanic)	Pop 2020	2020
White alone (NH)	890	34.19%
Black or African American alone (NH)	109	4.19%
Native American or Alaska Native alone (NH)	1	0.04%
Asian alone (NH)	120	4.61%
Native Hawaiian or Pacific Islander alone (NH)	0	0.00%
Other race alone (NH)	37	1.42%
Mixed race or Multiracial (NH)	62	2.38%
Hispanic or Latino (any race)	1,384	53.17%
Total	2,603	100.00%

== Hopelawn Volunteer Engine Co. #1 ==
Hopelawn Engine Co. No. 1 was organized December 3, 1914, as the Hopelawn Fire Department No. 1.

The first headquarters was in Ed O'Brien's barber shop on Florida Grove Road and the equipment was one dozen buckets. The first fire, a few weeks after organizing, was about a half mile at Al Black's farm, All the members responded, running with their buckets to put out the hay barn fire. Buckets were used until 1916 when the Fords fire commissioners purchased a chemical wagon which was pulled by manpower

The next fire was at the McHose building on the corner of Florida Grove Road and New Brunswick Avenue, and the firemen were able to save the building.

New equipment was purchased and housed in Barrett's barn on the corner of Florida Grove Road and May Street. An alarm system consisting of a locomotive wheel and hammer was also set up at this site. In 1918 lots were purchased on the corner of May and Charles Streets and the building was erected in 1921. Hopelawn's first fire chief was John Jancisko.

The Hopelawn First Aid Squad was organized in 1937 by the Hopelawn Engine Co #1.

== Notable people ==
People who were born in, residents of, or otherwise closely associated with Hopelawn include:

- Lou Creekmur, a 1996 inductee of the Pro Football Hall of Fame in Canton, Ohio. Creekmur played for Woodbridge High School, College of William and Mary, and for ten years as an offensive lineman with the Detroit Lions. He was selected to play in eight Pro Bowls. Creekmur was also a radio broadcaster for the Miami Dolphins.

== See also ==
- List of neighborhoods in Woodbridge Township, New Jersey
- List of neighborhoods in Edison, New Jersey
