= Jim David (American football) =

American football player (1927–2007)

No. 25
- Position: Defensive back

Personal information
- Born: December 2, 1927; Florence, South Carolina, U.S.
- Died: July 29, 2007 (aged 79); Detroit, Michigan, U.S.
- Listed height: 5 ft 11 in (1.80 m)
- Listed weight: 178 lb (81 kg)

Career information
- College: Colorado State
- NFL draft: 1952: 22nd round, 261st overall pick

Career history

Playing
- Detroit Lions (1952–1959)

Coaching
- Los Angeles Rams (1960–1962) Defensive backs; San Francisco 49ers (1963–1966) Defensive backs; Detroit Lions (1967–1972) Defensive coordinator

Awards and highlights
- 3× NFL champion (1952, 1953, 1957); 2× Second-team All-Pro (1954, 1956); 6× Pro Bowl (1954–1959); Detroit Lions 75th Anniversary Team; Detroit Lions All-Time Team

Career NFL statistics
- Interceptions: 36
- Fumble recoveries: 5
- Stats at Pro Football Reference
- Coaching profile at Pro Football Reference

James Theodoric "The Hatchet" David (December 2, 1927 – July 29, 2007) was an American professional football player and coach in the National Football League (NFL). He played defensive back for the Detroit Lions and was a three-time league champion and six-time Pro Bowl selection.

David played college football for the Colorado A&M Aggies, now known as the Colorado State Rams. He was selected in the 22nd round of the 1952 NFL draft by the Lions. After retiring in 1959, David went on to coach for the Los Angeles Rams and San Francisco 49ers as a defensive backs coach and then with Detroit as their defensive coordinator.

As an NFL player, David was among the most durable and effective ballhawks in the 1950s decade. In eight seasons, he never sat out a game, 102 in all. David recorded 36 interceptions in the regular season, which rank fifth in Lions history. He had three more in the postseason.

== College career ==
David played offensive and defensive halfback, linebacker and end at Colorado A&M from 1949 to 1951. In his senior year, he was ranked second in the nation in receptions. During his college career, David lettered in both football and baseball. Prior to attending college, he served in the Army as a staff sergeant in the infantry, which included a tour-of-duty in Europe.

David was inducted to the Colorado State University Athletics Hall of Fame in 1989.

== Professional career ==
David is widely regarded as one of the most underrated players in team history. The six-time Pro Bowler roamed in the Lions secondary, often referred to as "Chris' Crew", for eight seasons after being drafted out of Colorado A&M. David's teammates in that secondary included Hall of Famers Jack Christiansen and Yale Lary. He recorded a season-high seven interceptions three times (1952, 1954 and 1956).

David was undersized for his position -- 5-foot-11 and 178 pounds -- but he played bigger than his size. Known for an aggressive style that was the source of much consternation among opponents, he was a major contributor for Lions championship teams in the 1952, 1953 and 1957 seasons. David was at the center of several controversial plays, most notably in 1953, when he delivered devastating hits that knocked future Hall of Famers Y. A. Tittle (San Francisco 49ers) and Tom Fears (Los Angeles Rams) out of games.

After retirement as a player, David immediately entered the coaching ranks, joining the Los Angeles Rams staff as defensive backs coach from 1960 to 1962. He later became the Rams chief talent scout in 1963. He then joined Jack Christiansen's San Francisco 49ers coaching staff as secondary coach from 1964 to 1966.

In 1967, another former Lions' teammate and Hall of Famer, Joe Schmidt, hired David to help run the Lions' defense. He served in that capacity for six seasons from 1967 to 1972. Among the star players he coached was Hall of Famer Lem Barney, whom David presented during his Pro Football Hall of Fame enshrinement in 1992.
