= Darris McCord =

American football player (1933–2013)

- McCord in Detroit Lions uniform (Photo from The Detroit News)

No. 78
- Positions: Defensive end, defensive tackle, offensive tackle

Personal information
- Born: January 4, 1933; Detroit, Michigan, U.S.
- Died: October 9, 2013 (aged 80); Bloomfield Hills, Michigan, U.S.
- Listed height: 6 ft 4 in (1.93 m)
- Listed weight: 250 lb (113 kg)

Career information
- High school: Franklin (Franklin, Tennessee); Cass Tech (Detroit)
- College: Tennessee (1951–1954)
- NFL draft: 1955: 3rd round, 36th overall pick

Career history
- Detroit Lions (1955–1967)

Awards and highlights
- NFL champion (1957); Pro Bowl (1957); First-team All-American (1954); First-team All-SEC (1954)

Career NFL statistics
- Interceptions: 3
- Fumble recoveries: 9
- Total touchdowns: 1
- Sacks: 38.5
- Stats at Pro Football Reference

Darris Paul McCord (January 4, 1933 – October 9, 2013) was an American professional football player for 13 seasons with the Detroit Lions of the National Football League (NFL) from 1955 to 1967. He played college football for the Tennessee Volunteers where he was selected by the Football Writers Association of America (FWAA) as a first-team All-American tackle in 1954. He played in the NFL principally as a defensive end. He was a member of the 1957 Lions team that won the NFL championship and was selected to play in the Pro Bowl that year. At the time of his retirement, his 168 games with the Lions was a franchise record.

== Early life ==
McCord was born in 1933 in Franklin, Tennessee, and moved to Detroit as a boy when his father sought a factory job. He had four siblings, two sisters, Ura and Betty, and two brothers, Ken and Frank. He began his high school education at Cass Tech in Detroit, but graduated in 1950 from Franklin High School in Tennessee. He also attended the Battle Ground Military Academy for one year after graduating from high school.

== College football ==
In 1952, McCord enrolled at the University of Tennessee where he played college football for the Tennessee Volunteers football team under head coaches Robert Neyland in 1952 and Harvey Robinson from 1953 to 1954. He was a member of the 1952 Tennessee team that was ranked #8 in the final AP Poll and played in the 1953 Cotton Bowl Classic. As a senior, he was selected by the Football Writers Association of America as a first-team tackle on the 1954 College Football All-America Team. He also played in the 1954 Blue–Gray Football Classic, the 1955 Senior Bowl, and the 1955 Chicago College All-Star Game.

== Professional football ==
McCord was selected by the Detroit Lions in the third round, 36th overall pick, of the 1955 NFL draft. He played for the Lions for 13 years from 1955 to 1967. He alternated between defensive tackle and defensive end through 1958. In 1959, he moved to left defensive end and remained there for the rest of his career with the Lions. In 1957, he played in all 12 regular season games, and both post-season games, for the Lions team that won the NFL West Division and defeated the Cleveland Browns, 59–14, in the 1957 NFL Championship Game. After the 1957 season, McCord was invited to play in the 1958 Pro Bowl.

McCord was one of the most durable Lions of all-time, missing only two regular-season game during his career. As a member of one of the NFL’s defensive lines termed as the Fearsome Foursome, he teamed up with fellow end Sam Williams, and tackles Alex Karras and Roger Brown, forming one of the most dominant defensive lines of the early 1960s. The Foursome spearheaded a defense that holds two of the top four sack totals in Lions history, with 50 in 1964 and 49 in 1965.

At the time of his retirement, his 168 games with the Lions was a franchise record. Wayne Walker broke McCord's record in 1970, and Jason Hanson is the current record holder.

== Later life ==
After retiring from football, McCord operated an engineering reprographics business. He was diagnosed in March 2013 with pancreatic cancer. He died at his home in Bloomfield Hills, Michigan in October 2013 at age 80. He was survived by his wife, Helen, two daughters, and a son.
