= Roger Brown (defensive tackle) =

American football player (1937–2021)

- Brown in 1963

No. 76, 78
- Position: Defensive tackle

Personal information
- Born: May 1, 1937; Surry County, Virginia, U.S.
- Died: September 17, 2021 (aged 84)
- Listed height: 6 ft 5 in (1.96 m)
- Listed weight: 300 lb (136 kg)

Career information
- High school: Nyack (Nyack, New York)
- College: Maryland State (1956–1959)
- NFL draft: 1960: 4th round, 42nd overall pick
- AFL draft: 1960

Career history
- Detroit Lions (1960–1966); Los Angeles Rams (1967–1969)

Awards and highlights
- 2× First-team All-Pro (1962, 1963); Second-team All-Pro (1965); 6× Pro Bowl (1962–1967); Detroit Lions 75th Anniversary Team; Detroit Lions All-Time Team; Pride of the Lions; 2× First-team NAIA All-American (1958, 1959); Virginia Sports Hall of Fame; NFL record: Most safeties in a season: 2 (tied)

Career NFL statistics
- Games played: 138
- Starts: 124
- Safeties: 3
- Fumble recoveries: 15
- Interceptions: 2
- Stats at Pro Football Reference
- College Football Hall of Fame

Roger Lee Brown (May 1, 1937 – September 17, 2021) was an American professional football player who was a defensive tackle in the National Football League (NFL) for the Detroit Lions (1960–1966) and the Los Angeles Rams (1967–1969). He played college football for the Maryland State Hawks.

Brown was selected to the NFL Pro Bowl game every year for six successive seasons, running from 1962 through 1967.

== Early life ==
Brown was born on May 1, 1937, in Surry County, Virginia, and grew up in Newport News, Virginia, and the Village of Nyack, in Rockland County, New York. He went to Nyack High School where he was an "unstoppable 245-pound fullback" on the school's football team, graduating in 1956. Brown led the Rockland Public Schools Athletic League in scoring in 1954 and 1955. He was first-team All-County in football two consecutive years. He was also a champion wrestler and discus thrower. He was elected to the Rockland County Sports Hall of Fame in 1975.

== College ==
=== Football ===
He played college football for the Maryland State College Hawks (now the University of Maryland Eastern Shore) for four years, from 1956-1959, where he was an industrial arts major. He played for College Football Hall of Fame coach Vernon "Skip" McCain. Brown was a defensive lineman. Over his four years, the Hawks had a 24-5-1 record, kept opposing teams to an average 7.3 points per game, and outscored opponents 693 to 213.

The Hawks won the Central Intercollegiate Athletic Association (CIAA) title in 1957. In 1958 and 1959, Brown was named a National Association of Intercollegiate Athletics (NAIA) All-American. He was named a Pittsburgh Courier Black All-America twice.

He played in the Chicago College All-Star game against the Baltimore Colts in 1960. He was one of only four players who played outside of the major college football conferences to start in the game. The Colts won 29-0, in a game in which collegian Don Brown of the Houston Cougars (who would go on to play for the first Houston Oilers team) was nearly killed when notoriously violent Colts linebacker Bill Pellington hit him so hard that Brown swallowed his tongue and stopped breathing. He was saved by the frantic intervention of doctors and trainers. On the other hand, Colts offensive lineman Alex Sandusky encouraged Roger Brown throughout the game, and gave him guidance on how to correct his mistakes.

=== Disc jockey ===
UMES is located in Princess Anne, Somerset County, Maryland, on Maryland's Eastern Shore. During his school days at UMES, Brown worked as a DJ at an AM radio station in Salisbury, Maryland, the largest city on Maryland's Eastern Shore, where he was known as the "Big Nyack". He began at WICO AM and then went to WJDY. He had also been involved with a group creating an unauthorized radio broadcast at UMES, using a transmitter they built themselves. College officials shut it down.

== Professional career ==
Brown was drafted in the fourth round, 42nd overall, in the 1960 NFL draft by the Detroit Lions. He played right tackle with the original Lion's Fearsome Foursome, with future Pro Football Hall of Fame left tackle Alex Karras, and defensive ends Sam Williams and Darris McCord. Brown's addition to the line meant that the opposing team's center could not double team Karras as frequently. The group played together in 1962, 1964 and 1965 (Karras having been suspended in 1963). During the group's early years, coaching legend Don Shula was their defensive coordinator.

Brown was named the NFL's 1962 Outstanding Defensive Lineman. In the 1962 "Thanksgiving Day Massacre" game against the Green Bay Packers, Brown sacked future Hall of Fame quarterback Bart Starr seven times (the team had 11), including once for a safety. Brown was the outstanding player in a game where the Lions ended the NFL's reigning champions 12 game winning streak.

On September 30, 1962, Brown had earlier sacked100th Anniversary All-Time Team member Baltimore Colts quarterback Johnny Unitas for a safety. The two safeties in a single season tied an individual NFL record, first set in 1932.

He played for the Lions through the 1966 season, then was traded to the Los Angeles Rams, where he played form 1967-1969. During his stint with the Rams, Brown, along with future Hall of Famers and 100th Anniversary All-Time Team members defensive end Deacon Jones and defensive tackle Merlin Olson, along with defensive end Lamar Lundy, formed a Rams "Fearsome Foursome", the most feared defensive line at the time, and considered by some to be the best ever. The original Rams fearsome foursome of the mid-1960s had included Roosevelt "Rosey" Grier at tackle, whom Brown replaced.

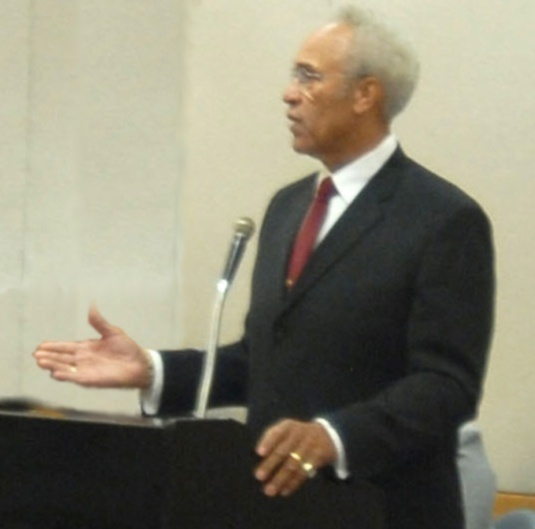
Brown in 2007.

The term "fearsome foursome" had not only been used for the Lions' line of the early 1960s, and the two Rams' defensive lines, but had also been used for the defensive lines of the New York Giants and Baltimore Colts of the late 1950s, and the San Diego Chargers of the early 1960s.

Brown retired after three seasons with the Rams, ending a career in which he was an NFL Pro Bowl player for 6 straight seasons (1962–1967) and a 2-time first-team All-Pro (1962 and 1963). Brown was one of the first NFL players to have a playing weight over 300 pounds, but his size and speed made him one of the most dynamic players of the time. Over his career, he had 75 or 78 sacks, two interceptions, and three safeties.

== Honors ==
In 1997, Brown was inducted into the Virginia Sports Hall of Fame. The Professional Football Researchers Association named Brown to the PRFA Hall of Very Good Class of 2007. Brown was inducted into the College Football Hall of Fame in 2009, and into the Black College Football Hall of Fame in 2015.

On Sunday, October 28, 2018, Brown was inducted into the Pride of the Lions at Ford Field during halftime of the game vs. the Seattle Seahawks.

In 2019, he was selected at No. 19 on the Detroit Free Press ranking of the Detroit Lions' top 100 all-time players. He was chosen for the team's 75th Anniversary Team in 2008.

== Personal life ==
After his playing career was over, Brown went into the restaurant business. He started a chain of eight restaurants in the Chicago area. Later, Brown became a regional personnel manager for McDonald's overseeing a staff of 65 people and operations at 289 franchises in 11 states. He also owned McDonald's franchise locations in Virginia. He owned Roger Brown's Restaurant and Sports Bar in Portsmouth, Virginia, the MoMac Brewing Company in Portsmouth, and the Cove Taverns in Williamsburg, and Newport News, Virginia. He was active in the Hampton Roads community, serving on 14 various local boards and committees. He was very involved with Portsmouth's Chamber of Commerce, its Olde Town Merchants Association, and Ronald McDonalds Charities.

== Death ==
Brown died on September 17, 2021. He was 84 years old.
