= Lou Creekmur =

American football player (1927–2009)

- Creekmur at Pro Football Hall of Fame induction

No. 76
- Position: Offensive tackle

Personal information
- Born: January 22, 1927; Hopelawn, New Jersey, U.S.
- Died: July 5, 2009 (aged 82); Tamarac, Florida, U.S.
- Listed height: 6 ft 4 in (1.93 m)
- Listed weight: 246 lb (112 kg)

Career information
- High school: Woodbridge (Woodbridge, New Jersey)
- College: William & Mary (1944; 1947–1949)
- NFL draft: 1948: 26th round, 243rd overall pick

Career history
- Detroit Lions (1950–1959)

Awards and highlights
- 3× NFL champion (1952, 1953, 1957); 6× First-team All-Pro (1951–1954, 1956, 1957); 2× Second-team All-Pro (1955, 1958); 8× Pro Bowl (1950–1957); Pride of the Lions; Detroit Lions 75th Anniversary Team; Detroit Lions All-Time Team; Second-team All-SoCon (1949)

Career NFL statistics
- Games played: 116
- Games started: 107
- Fumble recoveries: 3
- Stats at Pro Football Reference
- Pro Football Hall of Fame

Louis Creekmur (January 22, 1927 – July 5, 2009) was an American professional football offensive tackle who played for 10 years from 1950 to 1959 with the Detroit Lions of the National Football League (NFL). He was inducted into the Pro Football Hall of Fame in 1996.

Creekmur played his first two seasons in the NFL as a guard. He appeared in every pre-season, regular-season, and post-season game played by the Lions from 1950 to 1958—a streak of 165 consecutive games. He played in eight consecutive Pro Bowl games from 1950 to 1957 and was selected as an All-Pro player eight consecutive years from 1951 to 1958. During Creekmur's tenure with the team, the Lions advanced to the NFL championship game four times and won the championship in 1952, 1953, and 1957.

Creekmur played college football for the William & Mary Indians in 1944, then from 1947 to 1949.

== Early life and college ==
Creekmur was born in 1927 in Hopelawn, New Jersey. He attended Woodbridge High School in Woodbridge Township, New Jersey.

Creekmur attended the College of William & Mary, though his college education was interrupted by U.S. Army service in 1945 and 1946. He played for the William & Mary Indians football team in 1944 and from 1947 to 1949. He played for the #14-ranked 1947 William & Mary team that lost to Arkansas in the 1948 Dixie Bowl, and in the 1949 Delta Bowl, he returned an interception 70 yards to help the #17-ranked 1948 William & Mary team defeat Missouri Valley Conference champion Oklahoma A&M by a 20–0 score.

== Professional football ==
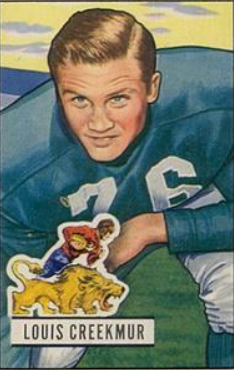
1951 Bowman card of Creekmur for Detroit Lions

Creekmur was drafted by the Philadelphia Eagles in the 26th round, 243rd overall pick, of the 1948 NFL draft, but continued playing college football in 1948 and 1949. He was acquired by the Detroit Lions prior to the 1950 NFL season and spent his entire NFL career with the Lions. Beginning with the 1950 season, Creekmur appeared in every pre-season, regular season, and post-season game played by the Lions from 1950 to 1958—a streak of 165 games. He played through multiple injuries, including dislocated shoulders, knee injuries, and one whole season with a crushed sternum.

Creekmur began his career with the Lions as an offensive guard for two years and then moved to the offensive tackle position, though he also played some on defense as well. He was considered an "outstanding blocker" for Detroit teams that featured backfield stars Bobby Layne and Doak Walker. He played in eight consecutive Pro Bowl games from 1950 to 1957 and was selected by the Associated Press as a first-team All-Pro player six times in seven years from 1951 to 1954 and 1956–1957. With Creekmur in the line, the Lions advanced to the NFL championship game four times and won the championship in 1952, 1953, and 1957.

During his rookie season, Creekmur was the victim of a highly publicized extortion attempt in which a "notorious hoodlum" schemed with others to falsely accuse him of sexual assault on a night club dancer. Two individuals were later convicted after a trial in the matter.

Near the end of the 1958 season, Creekmur, at age 31, announced that he would retire at the end of the season, ending his 168-game playing streak. The Lions held a "Lou Creekmur Day" for their December 14, 1958, game against the New York Giants. In October 1959, after the Lions lost their first four games, the Lions persuaded Creekmur to return to the club. Creekmur appeared in the final eight games of the 1959 season.

During his playing career, Creekmur worked a second job as the terminal manager for the Saginaw Transfer Company and made more money as terminal manager than he did as an All-Pro football player.

== Later years and honors ==
After retiring from football, Creekmur worked for a time in the 1960s and 1970s for Ryder Trucks as a director of labor relations and later as vice president of labor relations in Florida.

Creek received numerous honors, including the following:

- In 1975, sports writer Joe Falls named him one of his 11 greatest Lions.
- In 1976, sports writer George Puscas jokingly dubbed Creekmur as "perhaps the finest holder of all time". Puscas recalled that Creekmur would cup his hands in front of his chest to "grab a handful of jersey, or the edge of a shoulder pad" and noted: "I remember telling Creekmur in his late years that I would spend the entire game just watching him, to make note and study of his craftmanship and perhaps compose an essay on it."
- In 1983, Puscas included Creekmur on his all-time Lions team.
- In 1989, he was inducted into the Virginia Sports Hall of Fame.
- In 1996, he was inducted into the Pro Football Hall of Fame in his 32nd year of eligibility—at that time, a record wait for an inductee. Creekmur said at the time, "I kept falling through the cracks."

Creekmur died in 2009 at University Hospital in Tamarac, Florida. He was diagnosed post-mortem as having developed Chronic traumatic encephalopathy following a 30-year decline of cognition. He was one of at least 345 NFL players to be diagnosed after death with this disease, which is caused by repeated hits to the head.
