= Pride of the Lions =

Ring of honor for the Detroit Lions

The Pride of the Lions is a team-specific hall of fame, honoring former members of the Detroit Lions, an American football team in the National Football League (NFL). Considered to be the organization's highest individual honor, inductees' names, jersey numbers, and years played in Detroit are featured in a permanent display on the former Hudson's warehouse at Ford Field in Detroit, Michigan. The Pride of the Lions is sometimes referred to as the team's ring of honor.

Established in 2009, the Pride of the Lions' inaugural class featured 12 inductees, all of whom had already been inducted into the Pro Football Hall of Fame. There have been 22 former players inducted into the Pride of the Lions.

== Inductees ==
Key
Symbol	Meaning
†	Inducted into the Pro Football Hall of Fame

Inducted	Player	Position	Years with the Lions	Refs
2009	Lem Barney†	Cornerback	1967–1977	
2009	Jack Christiansen†	Safety	1951–1958	
2009	Dutch Clark†	Quarterback	1931–1932, 1934–1938	
2009	Dutch Clark†	General manager	1936–1938	
2009	Dutch Clark†	Head coach	1937–1938	
2009	Lou Creekmur†	Guard, tackle	1950–1959	
2009	Dick "Night Train" Lane†	Cornerback	1960–1965	
2009	Yale Lary†	Defensive back, punter	1952–1953, 1956–1964	
2009	Bobby Layne†	Quarterback	1950–1958	
2009	Barry Sanders†	Running back	1989–1998	
2009	Charlie Sanders†	Tight end	1968–1977	
2009	Joe Schmidt†	Linebacker	1953–1965	
2009	Joe Schmidt†	Head coach	1967–1972	
2009	Doak Walker†	Halfback	1950–1955	
2009	Alex Wojciechowicz†	Center, linebacker	1938–1946	
2010	Dick LeBeau†	Defensive back	1959–1972	
2013	Jason Hanson	Kicker	1992–2012	
2016	Dick Stanfel†	Guard	1952–1955	
2018	Roger Brown	Defensive tackle	1960–1966	
2018	Alex Karras†	Defensive tackle	1958–1962, 1964–1970	
2018	Herman Moore	Wide receiver	1991–2001	
2021	Chris Spielman	Linebacker	1988–1995	
2021	Chris Spielman	Executive	2020–present	
2023	Lomas Brown	Tackle	1985–1995	
2024	Calvin Johnson†	Wide receiver	2007–2015	
2025	Robert Porcher	Defensive end	1992–2004	
