= Yale Lary =

American football player, businessman, and politician (1930–2017)

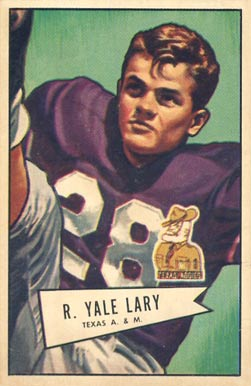
- Lary on a 1952 Bowman football card

No. 28
- Positions: Safety, punter, return specialist

Personal information
- Born: November 24, 1930; Fort Worth, Texas, U.S.
- Died: May 11, 2017 (aged 86); Fort Worth, Texas, U.S.
- Listed height: 5 ft 11 in (1.80 m)
- Listed weight: 185 lb (84 kg)

Career information
- High school: North Side (Fort Worth)
- College: Texas A&M (1948–1951)
- NFL draft: 1952: 3rd round, 34th overall pick

Career history
- Detroit Lions (1952–1953, 1956–1964)

Awards and highlights
- 3× NFL champion (1952, 1953, 1957); 3× First-team All-Pro (1956, 1958, 1962); 2× Second-team All-Pro (1957, 1959); 9× Pro Bowl (1953, 1956–1962, 1964); NFL 1950s All-Decade Team; Pride of the Lions; Detroit Lions 75th Anniversary Team; Detroit Lions All-Time Team; First-team All-SWC (1951)

Career NFL statistics
- Interceptions: 50
- Interception yards: 787
- Punts: 503
- Punting yards: 22,279
- Stats at Pro Football Reference
- Pro Football Hall of Fame

Robert Yale Lary Sr. (November 24, 1930 – May 11, 2017) was an American professional football player, businessman, and politician. He played for 11 seasons as a safety, punter and return specialist for the Detroit Lions of the National Football League (NFL). He was inducted into the Pro Football Hall of Fame in 1979 and was also selected for the NFL 1950s All-Decade Team.

A native of Fort Worth, Texas, Lary played college football for the Texas A&M Aggies from 1949 to 1951 and was selected as a first-team defensive back on the 1951 All-Southwest Conference football team. He also played baseball at Texas A&M, led his team to the 1951 College World Series, and set a Southwest Conference record for doubles. He was inducted into the Texas A&M Athletic Hall of Fame, the Texas Sports Hall of Fame, and the Michigan Sports Hall of Fame.

Lary played in the NFL with the Lions from 1952 to 1953 and from 1956 to 1964, missing the 1954 and 1955 seasons due to military service as an Army second lieutenant in Korea. He appeared in nine Pro Bowl games, and was a first-team All-NFL player five times. He led the NFL in punting three times, and at the time of his retirement in 1964, his 44.3-yard punting average ranked second in NFL history, trailing only Sammy Baugh. He also totaled 50 NFL interceptions for 787 return yards, both of which ranked fifth in NFL history at the time of his retirement.

== Early life ==
Lary was born in Fort Worth, Texas, in 1930. He attended North Side High School in Fort Worth, where he was a multi-sport athlete, receiving three letters each in football and baseball, two in track and field, and one in basketball.

== College career ==
Lary enrolled at Texas A&M University, where he played college football for the Texas A&M Aggies football team from 1949 to 1951. On November 29, 1951, in his last college football game, Lary ran 68 yards for a touchdown and caught a 37-yard touchdown pass, both in the third quarter, to lead Texas A&M to its first victory over Texas in 12 years. After the season, he was selected by the Associated Press as a first-team defensive back on the 1951 All-Southwest Conference football team.

Lary also starred in baseball as an outfielder for the Texas A&M baseball team. He set a Southwest Conference record for doubles and led the 1951 Texas A&M team to the Southwest Conference co-championship, a 20–9 record, and an appearance in the 1951 College World Series.

== Professional athlete ==
=== Detroit Lions (1952–1953) ===
Lary was selected by the Detroit Lions in the third round of the 1952 NFL draft. He signed with the Lions in June 1952, and played his entire NFL career for the Lions as a safety, punter, and return specialist.

As a rookie, Lary played all 12 regular-season games in the defensive backfield, intercepting four passes and recovering a fumble. He also returned 16 punts for an 11.4 yard average (including a 58-yard return for a touchdown against the Dallas Texans) and 12 kickoffs for a 25.2-yard average. The Lions defeated the Cleveland Browns, 17–7, in the 1952 NFL Championship Game.

In his second NFL season, Lary intercepted five passes in 11 regular season games, and returned a punt 74 yards for a touchdown against the Baltimore Colts on October 4, 1953. The Lions again defeated the Browns, 17–16, in the 1953 NFL Championship Game. Lary was selected to play in the 1953 Pro Bowl.

=== Professional baseball ===
Lary also played professional baseball in the summer during his first few years in the NFL. He had been offered a $20,000 bonus by the St. Louis Cardinals after his junior season, but he declined the offer and returned for his senior year at Texas A&M. In January 1953, within days after the Lions' NFL championship, Lary signed a contract to play professional baseball for the Beaumont Exporters of the Texas League. He appeared in at least seven games for Beaumont in 1953. Lary again played minor league baseball in the summer of 1953, batting .429 for the Lake Charles Lakers and also playing for the Macon Peaches. In 1956, he played for the Austin Senators of the Texas League. He concluded his baseball career in 1957, appearing in 24 games for Lake Charles and five games for Austin.

=== Military service ===
In May 1954, Lary, who had served in the Reserve Officers' Training Corps at Texas A&M and was a reserve lieutenant, was ordered to report for duty in the United States Army, effective in July. Lary was stationed at Fort Benning in Georgia, and missed the 1954 and 1955 seasons due to military service.

=== Detroit Lions (1956–1964) ===
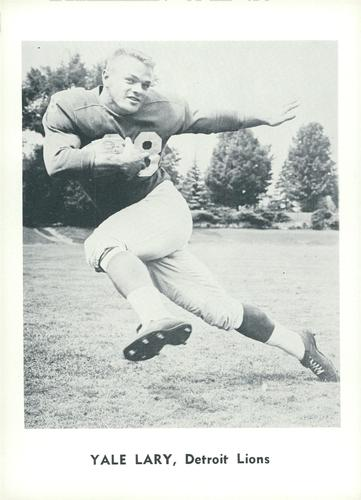
Lary in 1961

In January 1956, Lary signed a contract to return to the Lions after completing his military service in May 1956. Upon returning to the Lions, Lary became a regular in the Pro Bowl, playing in the all-star match every year from 1956 to 1962 and again in 1964. He also received first-team All-NFL honors in five years: 1956 (Associated Press [AP] and The Sporting News [TSN]); 1957 (TSN, United Press International [UPI], Newspaper Enterprise Association [NEA]); 1958 (AP, UPI, NEA); 1959 (TSN, NEA); and 1962 (AP, UPI, NEA).

During his NFL career, Lary played in Detroit's dominant defensive backfields that also included Hall of Fame inductees Jack Christiansen, Night Train Lane, and Dick LeBeau and six-time Pro Bowl selectee Jim David, with Hall of Famer Joe Schmidt filling in the gaps at middle linebacker. Playing at the right safety position, Lary ranked second in the NFL with eight interceptions in both 1956 and 1962. During his career, he totaled 50 interceptions, which ranked fifth in NFL history at the time of his retirement (trailing only Emlen Tunnell, Night Train Lane, Jack Butler, and Bobby Dillon). His 50 interception currently ranks third in Detroit Lions history behind Dick LeBeau and Lem Barney.

Lary was also known for his speed and evasiveness on interception returns. He returned an interception 73 yards for a touchdown in 1956, and his career total of 787 interception return yards ranked fifth in NFL history at the time of his retirement.

In 1957, Lary helped lead the Lions to a third NFL championship in his four years with the team. On October 13, 1957, he intercepted two passes against the Los Angeles Rams, including one which he returned 63 yards to set up the game-winning touchdown. The Lions defeated the Browns, 59–14, in the 1957 NFL Championship Game.

From 1959 to 1964, Lary was the most dominant punter in the NFL. He led the league in punting average in 1959 (45 punts for a 47.1 yard average and a long punt of 67 yards), 1961 (52 punts for an average of 48.4 yards and long punt of 71 yards) and 1963 (35 punts for an average of 48.9 yards and a long punt of 73 yards). Lary narrowly missed a fourth punting title in 1964, trailing Bobby Walden by one-tenth of a yard (or 3.6 inches) at 46.3 yards per punt. In 1962, he was two-tenths of a yard from the lead, losing the punting title due to a single blocked punt. Over the course of his 11-year NFL career, he punted 503 times for 22,279 yards for an average of 44.3 yards. His 48.9 yard average in 1963 was the second highest single-season total in NFL history, trailing only Sammy Baugh's 51.3 yard average in 1940. At the time of his retirement in 1964, Lary's 44.3 yard career punting average ranked second in NFL history, trailing only Sammy Baugh.

In addition to the length of his punts, Lary was also known for the hang time on his punts and once had a string of six games and 32 punts with no returns. Teammate Joe Schmidt later recalled, "Kicking from the end zone, Yale invariably put the ball across midfield with enough hang time to let us cover the kick. He made our defense look good because he always gave us room to work."

In 1992, sports writer Jack Saylor rated Lary as the second best punter in NFL history. Paul Hornung went further, saying in 2004 that Lary was the best punter ever.

Lary also handled punt returns for the Lions. He returned three punts for touchdowns and was among the NFL leaders in punt return yardage and yards per return in 1952, 1953, 1957, and 1958. He had the NFL's longest punt return in 1957 at 71 yards.

In July 1965, Lary announced that he was retiring from football. He said at the time that "it's too much to move my wife and kids twice a year. It's not fair to them."

== NFL career statistics ==
Legend
	Won the NFL championship
	Led the league
**Bold**	Career high

=== Regular season ===
Year	Team	Punting					
Year	Team	GP	Punts	Yds	Lng	Avg	Blk
1952	DET	12	5	181	43	36.2	0
1953	DET	11	28	1,112	61	39.7	0
1956	DET	12	42	1,698	41	40.4	0
1957	DET	12	54	2,156	66	39.9	0
1958	DET	12	59	2,524	62	42.8	1
1959	DET	10	45	2,121	67	47.1	0
1960	DET	12	64	2,802	63	43.8	**2**
1961	DET	14	52	2,519	71	48.4	0
1962	DET	14	52	2,354	68	45.3	1
1963	DET	10	35	1,713	**73**	**48.9**	0
1964	DET	14	**67**	**3,099**	**73**	46.3	0
Career		133	503	22,279	73	44.3	4

=== Playoffs ===
Year	Team	Punting					
Year	Team	GP	Punts	Yds	Lng	Avg	Blk
1953	DET	1	4	197	**72**	**49.3**	0
1957	DET	2	**8**	**318**	50	39.8	0
Career		3	12	515	72	42.9	0

== Personal life and later years ==
Lary and his wife, Mary Jane, were married in 1952. They had two children: Yale Jr., and Nancy Jane. Followed by four grandchildren Tara, and Tori Mathews Yale III, and Erin Lary.

Even before retiring from the NFL, Lary served in the Texas House of Representatives, as a Democrat, from 1959 to 1963. In February 1965, he also broke ground on a Ford Motor Company dealership in Fort Worth to be owned by Lary and a childhood friend. He operated the automobile dealership for nearly a decade. He later formed an investment company with interests in real estate, oil and gas leases, and oil and natural gas production. He died on May 11, 2017, at the age of 86.

== Honors ==
Lary has received numerous honors and awards since retiring from football. These include:

- In 1969, Lary was selected as a defensive back on the National Football League 1950s All-Decade Team.
- In 1973, he was inducted into the Texas A&M Athletic Hall of Fame for his contributions in both baseball and football.
- In 1979, he was inducted into the Pro Football Hall of Fame, becoming only the fifth defensive back to be inducted, and only the second to be inducted for contributions to punting (charter member Sammy Baugh being the first).
- In 1983, sports writer George Puscas of the Detroit Free Press included Lary on his all-time Lions team.
- In 1988, he was inducted into the Michigan Sports Hall of Fame.
- In 1994, Lary was inducted into the Texas Sports Hall of Fame.
