= NFL 1950s All-Decade Team =

Official list of the NFL's best players in the 1950s

This is a list of all NFL players who had outstanding performances throughout the 1950s and have been compiled together into this fantasy group. The team was selected by voters of the Pro Football Hall of Fame retroactively in 1969 to mark the league's 50th anniversary.

Information referenced from the Hall of Fame website
Position	Player	Team(s)	Years	Hall of Fame Class
== Offense ==
Quarterback	Otto Graham	Cleveland Browns ^{[N1]}	1946–55	1965
Quarterback	Bobby Layne	Chicago Bears	1948	1967
Quarterback	Bobby Layne	New York Bulldogs	1949	1967
Quarterback	Bobby Layne	Detroit Lions	1950–58	1967
Quarterback	Bobby Layne	Pittsburgh Steelers	1958–62	1967
Quarterback	Norm Van Brocklin	Los Angeles Rams	1949–57	1971
Quarterback	Norm Van Brocklin	Philadelphia Eagles	1958–60	1971
Halfback	Frank Gifford	New York Giants	1952–60, 1962–64	1977
Halfback	Ollie Matson	Chicago Cardinals	1952, 1954–58	1972
Halfback	Ollie Matson	Los Angeles Rams	1959–62	1972
Halfback	Ollie Matson	Detroit Lions	1963	1972
Halfback	Ollie Matson	Philadelphia Eagles	1964–66	1972
Halfback	Hugh McElhenny	San Francisco 49ers	1952–60	1970
Halfback	Hugh McElhenny	Minnesota Vikings	1961–62	1970
Halfback	Hugh McElhenny	New York Giants	1963	1970
Halfback	Hugh McElhenny	Detroit Lions	1964	1970
Halfback	Lenny Moore	Baltimore Colts	1956–67	1975
Fullback	Alan Ameche	Baltimore Colts	1955–60	Not Inducted
Fullback	Joe Perry	San Francisco 49ers^{[N1]}	1948–60, 1963	1969
Fullback	Joe Perry	Baltimore Colts	1961–62	1969
End	Raymond Berry	Baltimore Colts	1955–67	1973
End	Tom Fears	Los Angeles Rams	1948–56	1970
End	Bobby Walston	Philadelphia Eagles	1951–62	Not Inducted
Halfback-End	Elroy "Crazy Legs" Hirsch	Chicago Rockets ^{[N1]}	1946–48	1968
Halfback-End	Elroy "Crazy Legs" Hirsch	Los Angeles Rams	1949–57	1968
Tackle	Roosevelt Brown	New York Giants	1953–65	1975
Tackle	Bob St. Clair	San Francisco 49ers	1953–63	1990
Guard	Dick Barwegen	New York Yankees ^{[N1]}	1947	Not Inducted
Guard	Dick Barwegen	Baltimore Colts^{[N1]}	1948–49	Not Inducted
Guard	Dick Barwegen	Chicago Bears	1950–52	Not Inducted
Guard	Dick Barwegen	Baltimore Colts	1953–54	Not Inducted
Guard	Jim Parker	Baltimore Colts	1957–67	1973
Guard	Dick Stanfel	Detroit Lions	1952–55	2016
Guard	Dick Stanfel	Washington Redskins	1956–58	2016
Center	Chuck Bednarik	Philadelphia Eagles	1949–62	1967
Kicker	Lou Groza	Cleveland Browns^{[N1]}	1949–59, 1961–67	1974
== Defense ==
End	Len Ford	Los Angeles Dons^{[N1]}	1948–49	1976
End	Len Ford	Cleveland Browns	1950–57	1976
End	Len Ford	Green Bay Packers	1958	1976
End	Gino Marchetti	Dallas Texans^{[N1]}	1952	1972
End	Gino Marchetti	Baltimore Colts	1953–64, 1966	1972
Tackle	Art Donovan	Baltimore Colts	1950	1968
Tackle	Art Donovan	New York Yanks	1951	1968
Tackle	Art Donovan	Dallas Texans	1952	1968
Tackle	Art Donovan	Baltimore Colts	1953–61	1968
Tackle	Leo Nomellini	San Francisco 49ers	1950–63	1969
Tackle	Ernie Stautner	Pittsburgh Steelers	1950–63	1969
Linebacker	Joe Fortunato	Chicago Bears	1955–66	Not Inducted
Linebacker	Bill George	Chicago Bears	1952–65	1974
Linebacker	Bill George	Los Angeles Rams	1966	1974
Linebacker	Sam Huff	New York Giants	1956–63	1982
Linebacker	Sam Huff	Washington Redskins	1964–67, 1969	1982
Linebacker	Joe Schmidt	Detroit Lions	1953–1965	1973
Halfback	Jack Butler	Pittsburgh Steelers	1951–59	2012
Halfback	Richard "Night Train" Lane	Los Angeles Rams	1952–1953	1974
Halfback	Richard "Night Train" Lane	Chicago Cardinals	1954–59	1974
Halfback	Richard "Night Train" Lane	Detroit Lions	1960–65	1974
Safety	Jack Christiansen	Detroit Lions	1951–58	1970
Safety	Yale Lary	Detroit Lions	1952–53, 1956–64	1979
Safety	Emlen Tunnell	New York Giants	1948–58	1967
Safety	Emlen Tunnell	Green Bay Packers	1959–61	1967

Notes:

^{N1} Team that belonged to the All-America Football Conference for at least part of the player's tenure
