= Lem Barney =

American football player (born 1945)

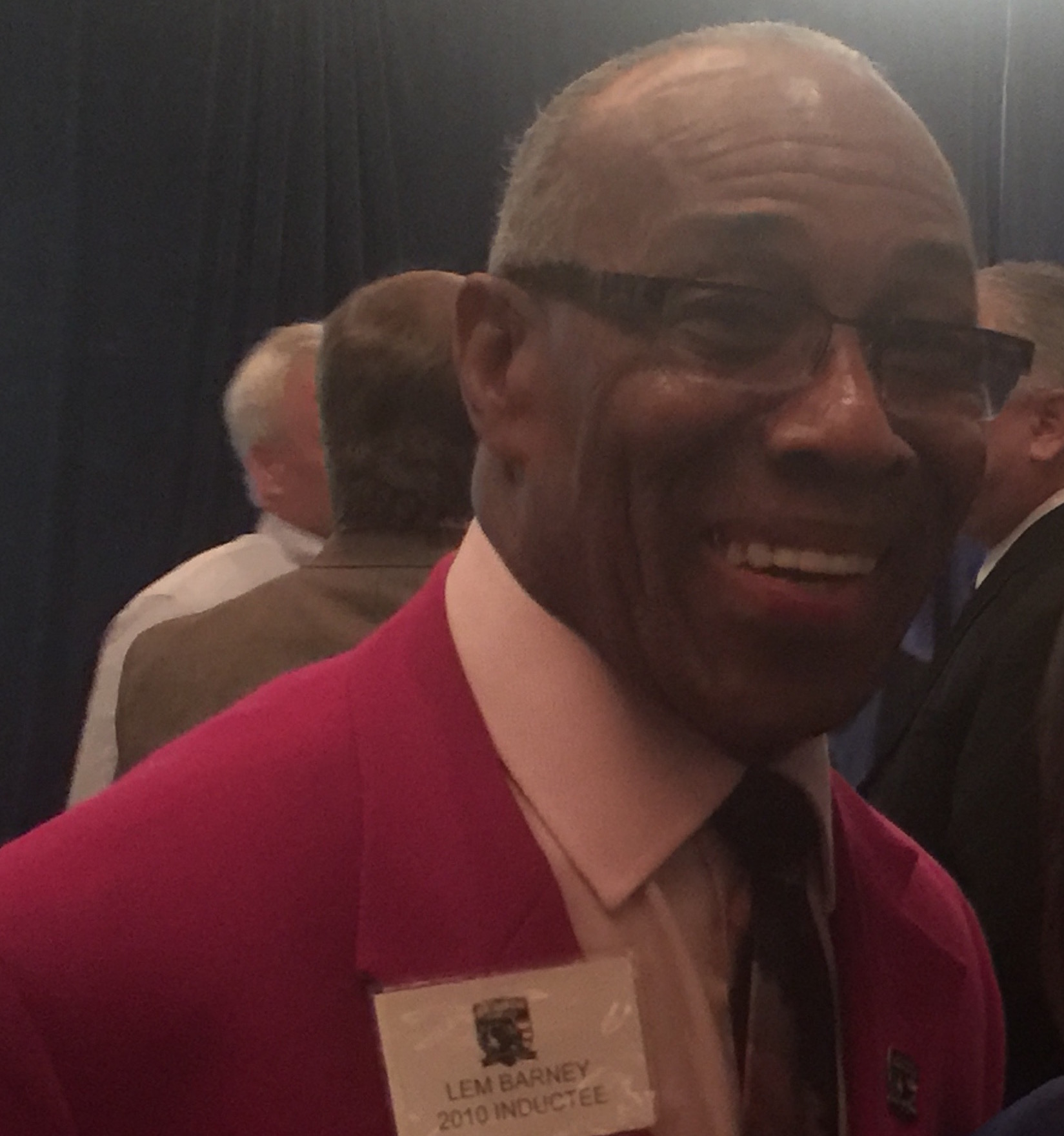
- Barney in 2015

No. 20
- Positions: Cornerback, return specialist

Personal information
- Born: September 8, 1945 (age 81); Gulfport, Mississippi, U.S.
- Listed height: 6 ft 0 in (1.83 m)
- Listed weight: 188 lb (85 kg)

Career information
- High school: 33rd Avenue (Gulfport)
- College: Jackson State (1964–1966)
- NFL draft: 1967: 2nd round, 34th overall pick

Career history
- Detroit Lions (1967–1977)

Awards and highlights
- NFL Defensive Rookie of the Year (1967); 2× First-team All-Pro (1968, 1969); Second-team All-Pro (1967); 7× Pro Bowl (1967–1969, 1972, 1973, 1975, 1976); NFL interceptions co-leader (1967); NFL 1960s All-Decade Team; Detroit Lions 75th Anniversary Team; Detroit Lions All-Time Team; Pride of the Lions; Detroit Lions No. 20 retired; NFL record: Most interceptions returned for touchdown in a rookie season: 3 (1967; tied) (Note: With Ronnie Lott and Janoris Jenkins)

Career NFL statistics
- Interceptions: 56
- Interception yards: 1,077
- Fumble recoveries: 17
- Defensive touchdowns: 8
- Return yards: 2,586
- Return touchdowns: 3
- Stats at Pro Football Reference
- Pro Football Hall of Fame

Lemuel Jackson Barney (born September 8, 1945) is an American former professional football player who was a cornerback and return specialist for the Detroit Lions of the National Football League (NFL) from 1967 to 1977, playing occasionally as a punter as well. He played college football for the Jackson State Tigers from 1964 to 1966. He was selected by the Lions in the 1967 NFL/AFL draft. He was named the NFL Defensive Rookie of the Year in 1967, played in seven Pro Bowls, and was selected as a first-team All-Pro player in 1968 and 1969. He was inducted into the Pro Football Hall of Fame in 1992. He has also been inducted into the Detroit Lions Hall of Fame, the Jackson State Sports Hall of Fame, the Michigan Sports Hall of Fame, and the Mississippi Sports Hall of Fame.

== Early life ==
Barney was born in Gulfport, Mississippi, on September 8, 1945. He attended the 33rd Avenue High School in Gulfport. He played at the quarterback position for his high school football team.

== College career ==
Barney attended Jackson State University, a historically black university in Jackson, Mississippi. His son Lem Barney III and grandson Lem Barney IV also followed in his footsteps and graduated from Jackson State. He played college football for the Tigers from 1964 to 1966 under head coach Rod Paige. He had 26 career interceptions at Jackson State, including nine in 1965 and 11 in 1966. He also had punt averages of 41.7 and 42.5 in those two seasons. Barney was an All-Southwestern Athletic Conference selection three straight years. He was also selected as an All-American by Ebony magazine and the Pittsburgh Courier.

== Professional career ==
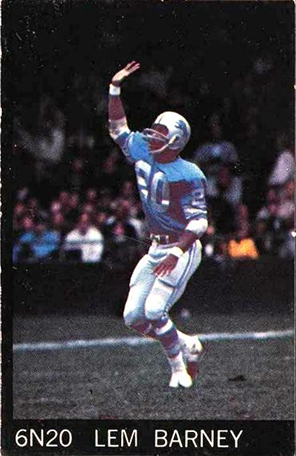
1968 Champion Corn Flakes card of Barney for Detroit Lions

Barney was selected by the Detroit Lions in the second round, 34th overall pick, of the 1967 NFL draft. As a rookie in 1967, Barney appeared in all 14 games as a starting cornerback and led the NFL with 10 interceptions, 232 interception return yards and three interceptions returned for touchdowns. After an injury to Pat Studstill, Barney also took over as the Lions' punter, punting 47 times for an average of 37.4 yards in 1967. On September 17, 1967, in the first quarter of his first NFL game, Barney intercepted the first pass thrown in his direction by Bart Starr and returned it 24 yards for a touchdown. In the final game of his rookie season, Barney intercepted three passes within ten minutes and returned one 71 yards for a touchdown. At the end of the 1967 season, he was selected by the Associated Press as the NFL Defensive Rookie of the Year.

After the 1967 season, Barney played in the 1968 Pro Bowl, and in the off-season, he was married and also served six months of active duty in the Navy.

Barney went on to be selected to seven Pro Bowls and was selected as a first-team All-NFL player in 1968 and 1969. During his 11 years in the NFL, Barney had 56 interceptions, 1,011 interception return yards, and seven interceptions returned for touchdowns. He also returned 143 punts for 1,312 yards and three touchdowns as well as 50 kickoff returns for 1,274 yards, including a 98-yard return for touchdown.

In March 1978, as part of a wiretap investigation into international drug smuggling, Barney's voice was heard allegedly discussing cocaine and amphetamines. Although investigators stated that Barney was not the focus of the investigation, the controversy received extensive press attention through the spring of 1978, as Barney was called to testify before a New York grand jury.

In August 1978, the Lions placed Barney on the injured waiver list. Barney's efforts to sign with another team were unsuccessful, and he did not play during the 1978 season. He was officially released by the Lions in February 1979.

== NFL career statistics ==
Legend
	NFL record
	Led the league
**Bold**	Career high

=== Regular season ===
Year	Team	Games		Interceptions					Fumbles					Returning				
Year	Team	GP	GS	Int	Yds	Avg	Lng	TD	Fum	FR	Yds	Avg	TD	Ret	Yds	Avg	Lng	TD
1967	DET	**14**	**14**	**10**	**232**	23.2	**71**	**3** (Note: Most interceptions returned for touchdown in a rookie season)	2	0	-5	-5.0	0	9	101	11.2	25	0
1968	DET	**14**	**14**	7	82	11.7	62	0	**5**	**5**	0	0.0	0	**38**	**749**	19.7	**98**	**1**
1969	DET	13	13	8	126	15.8	32	0	3	2	25	12.5	0	16	345	**21.6**	74	**1** (Note: Only leader in punt return touchdowns)
1970	DET	13	13	7	168	24.0	49	2	2	0	0	—	0	27	355	13.1	74	**1**
1971	DET	9	7	3	78	26.0	28	1	**5**	2	0	0.0	0	23	344	15.0	48	0
1972	DET	**14**	**14**	3	88	29.3	64	0	1	1	20	20.0	0	16	125	7.8	26	0
1973	DET	**14**	**14**	4	130	**32.5**	38	0	3	3	0	0.0	0	28	259	9.3	42	0
1974	DET	13	12	4	61	15.3	39	0	0	0	0	—	0	5	37	7.4	11	0
1975	DET	10	10	5	23	4.6	13	0	0	1	**74**	**74.0**	0	8	80	10.0	30	0
1976	DET	**14**	**14**	2	62	31.0	26	1	4	1	0	0.0	0	23	191	8.3	30	0
1977	DET	12	11	3	27	9.0	22	0	0	2	49	24.5	0	0	0	—	0	0
Career		140	136	56	1,077	19.2	71	7	25	17	163	9.6	0	193	2,586	13.4	98	3

=== Postseason ===
Year	Team	Games		Punt returns				
Year	Team	GP	GS	Ret	Yds	Avg	Lng	TD
1970	DET	1	1	5	20	4.0	8	0
Career		1	1	5	20	4.0	8	0

== Awards and honors ==
After retiring as a player, Barney received numerous honors, including the following:

- In 1980, he was inducted into the Detroit Lions Hall of Fame.
- In 1983, he was inducted into the Jackson State Sports Hall of Fame.
- In 1985, he was inducted into the Michigan Sports Hall of Fame.
- In 1986, he was inducted into the Mississippi Sports Hall of Fame.
- In 1992, he was inducted into the Pro Football Hall of Fame. Jim David, Barney's position coach with the Lions, gave the induction speech for Barney.
- In 1997, the Detroit Free Press selected Barney as the best cornerback in NFL history.
- In 1999, he was ranked 97th on The Sporting News' list of the 100 Greatest Football Players.
- In 2004, the Lions retired jersey #20 in tribute to three Lions greats who wore the number: Barney, Billy Sims and Barry Sanders.

== Entertainer ==
Barney is an accomplished singer who began singing with choirs in his youth and college. He befriended Motown recording artist Marvin Gaye, when Gaye unsuccessfully tried out for the Lions in 1970. Barney and teammate Mel Farr sang background vocals on Gaye's classic 1971 song "What's Going On". In 2015, Barney was invited to sing the national anthem at the Pro Football Hall of Fame induction ceremony.

Barney also had a brief acting career, beginning with a self-portrayal in the 1968 comedy, Paper Lion. In 1973, he was one of the stars of the blaxploitation biker film, The Black Six.

== Personal life ==
Barney and his wife, Martha, had a daughter, LaTrece, and a son, Lem III. After retiring from the NFL, Barney worked for many years, starting in 1979, in public affairs for Michigan Consolidated Gas Company. He also worked in the 1980s as a football broadcaster on BET and on pre-season games for the Detroit Lions.

In March 1993, after his car crashed into a guardrail on a Detroit freeway, Barney was arrested and charged with driving under the influence and possession of cocaine and marijuana. He was found not guilty of the drug charges following a jury trial in 1994.

In 2006, Barney published an autobiography titled, "The Supernatural: Lem Barney".

He held a public relations post at the Detroit Medical Center starting in 2006. After being fired from that position, he filed an age discrimination lawsuit in 2013. Also in 2013, Barney publicly declared that, in light of revelations about brain injuries resulting from football, he would not play football if he had the chance to live his life over again and predicted that the game of football would be gone in another 20 years.

His nephew Milton Barney also played in the NFL.

As of 2023, Barney was in failing health. He had been diagnosed with dementia and Alzheimer's disease in 2013 and had been under guardianship since 2018. On November 29, 2025, the Pro Football Hall of Fame erroneously released a statement announcing Barney's death.
