= 1942 Detroit Lions season =

NFL team season

- Head coach: Bill Edwards and Bull Karcis
- Home stadium: Briggs Stadium

Results
- Record: 0–11
- Division place: 5th NFL Western
- Playoffs: Did not qualify

The 1942 Detroit Lions season was the franchise's 13th season in the National Football League. The Lions suffered the first winless season since Cincinnati went 0–8 in 1934. This was the first NFL season during U.S. involvement in World War II, which led to player shortages, and thus a depletion of talent. The Lions were hit especially hard by the loss of star halfback Byron “Whizzer” White and tackle Tony Furst. Head coach Bill Edwards was sacked after three games, but the decision had no effect on the Lions’ fortunes.

While there were talks of suspending play, it was ultimately decided to allow all professional sports to continue as morale boosters on the home front. It would remain the only winless season for the Lions until 2008.

== Offseason ==
=== NFL Draft ===
1942 Detroit Lions draft
Round	Pick	Player	Position	College	Notes
1	5	Bob Westfall	FB	Michigan	
2	15	Alf Bauman	DT	Northwestern	
3	20	Bob Dethman	B	Oregon State	
4	30	Mickey Sanzotta	B	Case Western Reserve	
5	35	Joe Blalock	E	Clemson	
6	45	Murray Evans	BB	Hardin-Simmons	
7	55	Tom Colella	HB	Canisius	
8	65	Joeph Franceski	T	Scranton	
9	75	Emil Banjavic	WB	Arizona	
10	85	Bill Diehl	C	Iowa	
11	95	John Polanski	FB	Wake Forest	
12	105	Joe Stringfellow	HB	Southern Miss	
13	115	Tony Arena	C	Michigan State	
14	125	Wolf Heinberg	T	UC Santa Barbara	
15	135	Mac Speedie ^{†}	E	Utah	
16	145	Firman Bynum	T	Arkansas	
17	155	Dick Fisher	B	Ohio State	
18	165	George Speth	T	Murray State	
19	175	Blair Heaton	E	Susquehanna	
20	185	Ben Collins	B	West Texas A&M	
Made roster † Pro Football Hall of Fame

== Regular season ==
=== Schedule ===
Game	Date	Opponent	Result	Record	Venue	Attendance	Recap	Sources
1	September 20	at **Chicago Cardinals**	**L** 0–13	0–1	Comiskey Park	18,698	Recap	
2	September 27	**Cleveland Rams**	**L** 0–14	0–2	Briggs Stadium		Recap	
3	October 4	Brooklyn Dodgers	**L** 7–28	0–3	Briggs Stadium		Recap	
4	October 11	at **Green Bay Packers**	**L** 7–38	0–4	State Fair Park		Recap	
5	October 18	**Chicago Cardinals**	**L** 0–7	0–5	Briggs Stadium		Recap	
6	October 25	**Green Bay Packers**	**L** 7–28	0–6	Briggs Stadium		Recap	
7	November 1	at **Chicago Bears**	**L** 0–16	0–7	Wrigley Field		Recap	
8	November 8	Pittsburgh Steelers	**L** 7–35	0–8	Briggs Stadium		Recap	
9	November 15	at **Cleveland Rams**	**L** 7–27	0–9	League Park		Recap	
10	November 22	**Chicago Bears**	**L** 0–42	0–10	Briggs Stadium		Recap	
11	November 29	Washington Redskins	**L** 3–15	0–11	Briggs Stadium		Recap	
Note: Intra-division opponents are in **bold** text. September 20: Night game.

=== Standings ===
NFL Western Division
	W	L	T	PCT	DIV	PF	PA	STK
Chicago Bears	11	0	0	1.000	8–0	376	84	W11
Green Bay Packers	8	2	1	.800	6–2	300	215	W2
Cleveland Rams	5	6	0	.455	3–5	150	207	L1
Chicago Cardinals	3	8	0	.273	3–5	98	209	L6
Detroit Lions	0	11	0	.000	0–8	38	263	L11

Note: Tie games were not officially counted in the standings until 1972.

== Roster ==
1942 Detroit Lions final roster
Backs: 11 Emil Banjavic RB/CB/P; 25 Bill Callihan RB/S; 10 Lloyd Cardwell RB/CB; 46 Tommy Colella RB/CB/P; 23 Murray Evans RB/S; 31 Frank Grigonis FB/LB; 34 Elmer Hackney FB/LB; 14 Johnny Hall RB/CB; 44 Harry Hopp RB/CB; 12 Ned Mathews RB/CB; 42 Mickey Sanzotta FB/LB; 33 Harry Seltzer FB/LB; 40 Chet Wetterlund RB/CB/P	Linemen/Linebackers: 51 Sloko Gill C/LB; 72 Hank Goodman T/DT; 66 Bill Kennedy G/DG; 61 Augie Lio G/DG/K; 71 Ted Pavelec G/DG; 60 Larry Sartori G/DG; 52 John Schiechl C/LB; 73 George Speth T/DT; 75 Emil Uremovich T/DT; 68 Socko Wiethe G/DG	Ends/Receivers: 85 Charlie Behan; 80 Bill Fisk; 88 Larry Knorr; 82 Perry Scott; 81 Joe Stringfellow; 22 Paul Szakash; 50 Alex Wojciechowicz C/LB; Reserve: 52 Tony Arena LB/C (inactive); Stan Batinski G/DG (Military); Dave Diehl E (inactive); Tony Furst T/DT (Military); 32 John Polanski FB/LB (Military); Stillman Rouse E (Military); 79 Alex Schibanoff T/DT (Military); 65 Tony Zuzzio G/DG (Military); rookies in italics

== Awards and records ==
- Most giveaways, single game: 12 (vs. Chicago Bears)
