= Detroit Lions draft picks (1936–1969) =

The Detroit Lions are a professional American football team based in Detroit, Michigan. The Lions compete in the National Football League (NFL) as a member of the North Division of the National Football Conference. The franchise was founded in Portsmouth, Ohio, as the Portsmouth Spartans and joined the NFL on July 12, 1930. After being purchased by George A. Richards in 1934, the franchise was relocated to Detroit and renamed to the Detroit Lions in reference to the city's Major League Baseball franchise, the Detroit Tigers. The team plays its home games at Ford Field in Downtown Detroit.

The NFL draft, officially known as the "NFL Annual Player Selection Meeting", is an annual event which serves as the league's most common source of player recruitment. The draft order is determined based on the previous season's standings; the teams with the worst win–loss records receive the earliest picks. Teams that qualified for the NFL playoffs select after non-qualifiers, and their order depends on how far they advanced, using their regular season record as a tie-breaker. The final two selections in the first round are reserved for the Super Bowl runner-up and champion. Draft picks are tradable and players or other picks can be acquired with them.

In 1936, the Lions took part in the first NFL draft of college football players. With the eighth pick of the first round of that draft, Sid Wagner, a guard out of Michigan State University, became the Lions' first draft selection. In addition to the annual draft, the Lions took part in the 1950 All-America Football Conference (AAFC) dispersal draft. This draft was organized after the AAFC, which was formed as a competing league in 1946, merged with the NFL. Three teams from the AAFC were admitted into the NFL, while the remaining players from the five defunct teams became automatically eligible for selection by an existing NFL team in the dispersal draft. Thirteen of the players drafted by the Lions between 1936 and 1969 have been inducted into the Pro Football Hall of Fame. The Lions took part in every draft from 1936 to 1969, prior to the AFL–NFL merger and the formation of the modern draft in 1970.

== Key ==
Key
†	Indicates the player was inducted into the Pro Football Hall of Fame

== 1936 draft ==
Detroit Lions' selections in the 1936 NFL draftSource: Pro Football Reference
Round	Pick #	Overall	Name	Position (Note: Position reflects the source for each table (Pro Football Reference) and may not be representative of a player’s college position or a modern equivalent position.)	College
1	8	8	Sid Wagner	Guard	Michigan State
2	8	17	Chuck Cheshire	Back	UCLA
3	8	26	Andy Pilney	Back	Notre Dame
4	8	35	Sheldon Beise	Back	Minnesota
5	8	44	Kavanaugh Francis	Center	Alabama
6	8	53	Abe Mickal	Back	LSU
7	8	62	Charles Wasicek	Tackle	Colgate
8	8	71	Dale Rennebohm	Center	Minnesota
9	8	80	Bob Train	End	Yale

== 1937 draft ==
Detroit Lions' selections in the 1937 NFL draftSource: Pro Football Reference
Round	Pick #	Overall	Name	Position	College
1	7	7	Lloyd Cardwell	Wingback	Nebraska
2	7	17	Charley Hamrick	Tackle	Ohio State
3	7	27	Vern Huffman	Blocking back	Indiana
4	7	37	Bill Glassford	Guard	Pittsburgh
5	7	47	Maury Patt	End	Carnegie Mellon
6	7	57	George Bell	Guard	Purdue
7	7	67	John Sprague	End	SMU
8	7	77	Elvin Sayre	Center	Illinois
9	7	87	Larry Kelley	End	Yale
10	7	97	Kay Bell	Tackle	Washington State

== 1938 draft ==
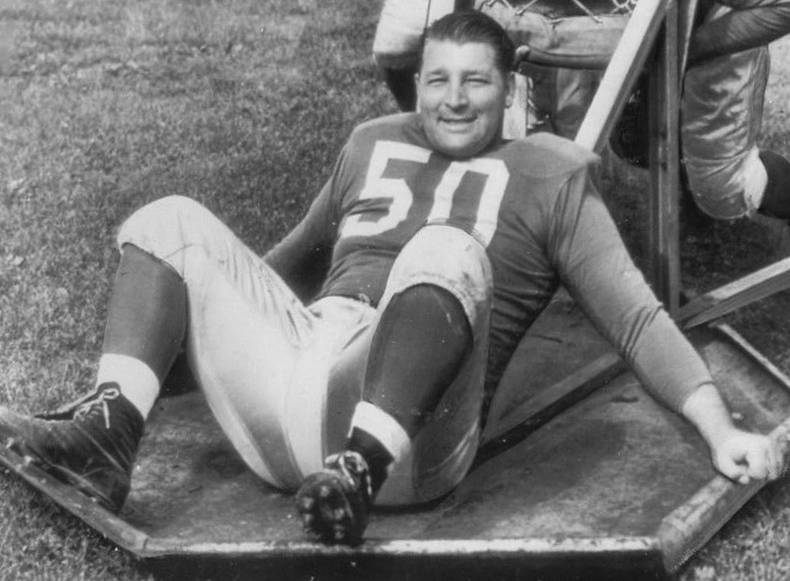
Hall of Famer Alex Wojciechowicz, a two-way player, was the Lions' first-round selection in the 1938 draft.

Detroit Lions' selections in the 1938 NFL draftSource: Pro Football Reference
Round	Pick #	Overall	Name	Position	College
1	6	6	Alex Wojciechowicz †	Center	Fordham
3	6	21	Pete Smith	End	Oklahoma
5	6	36	Andy Bershak	End	North Carolina
6	6	46	Karl Schleckman	Tackle	Utah
7	6	56	Paul Szakash	End	Montana
8	6	66	Dick Nardi	Back	Ohio State
9	6	76	Jim Sirtosky	Guard	Indiana
10	6	86	Ralph Wolf	Center	Ohio State
11	6	96	Clarence Douglass	Back	Kansas
12	6	106	Clint Frank	Back	Yale

== 1939 draft ==
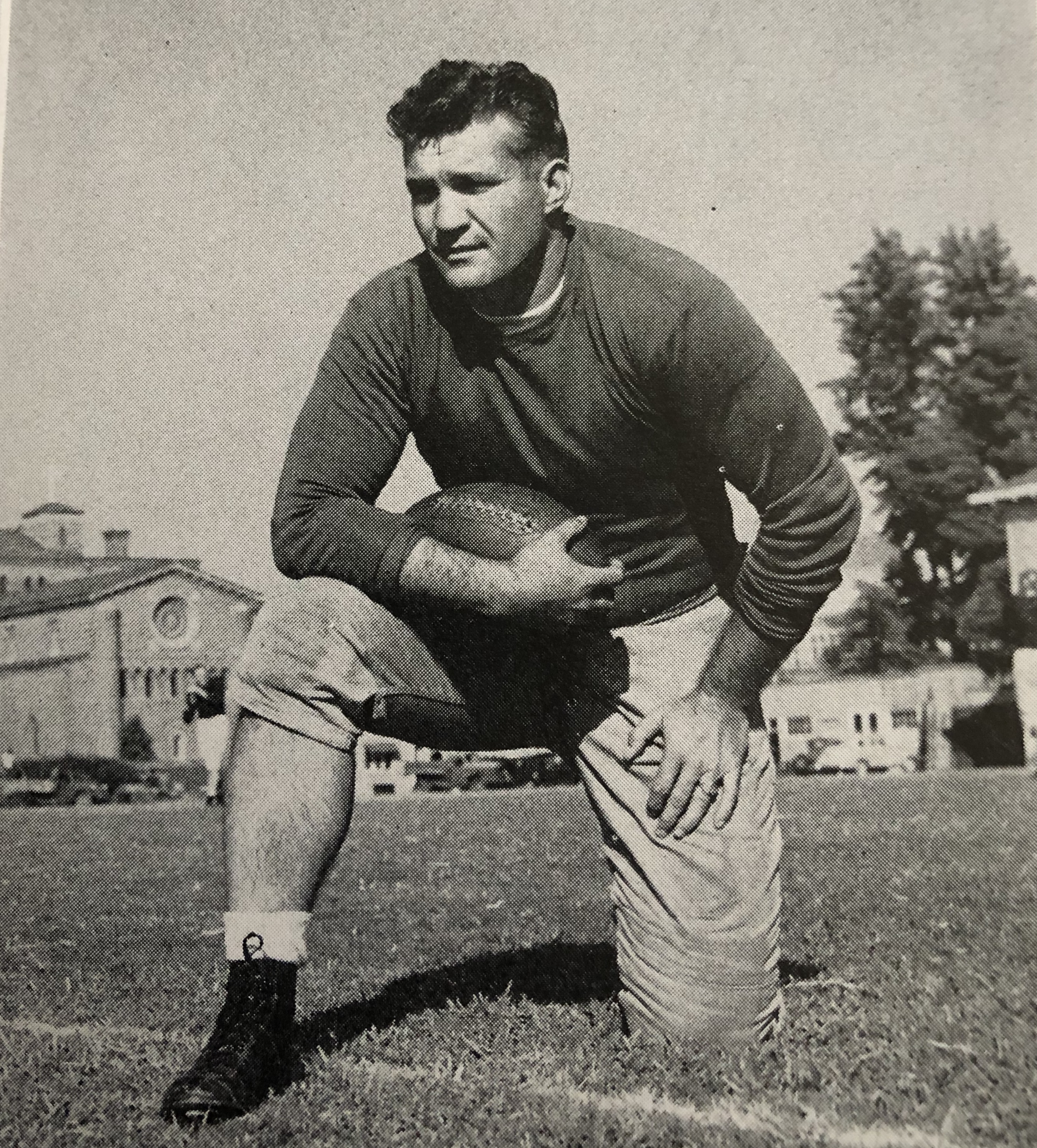
Raymond George was the Lions' tenth-round selection in the 1939 draft.

Detroit Lions' selections in the 1939 NFL draftSource: Pro Football Reference
Round	Pick #	Overall	Name	Position	College
1	7	7	John Pingel	Tailback	Michigan State
3	7	22	Howard Weiss	Fullback	Wisconsin
5	7	37	Steve Maronic	Tackle	North Carolina
6	7	47	Joe Wendlick	End	Oregon State
7	7	57	Darrell Tully	Tailback	Texas A&M–Commerce
8	7	67	Dick Trzuskowski	Tackle	Idaho
9	7	77	Bill Callihan	Back	Nebraska
10	7	87	Raymond George	Tackle	USC
11	7	97	Tony Calvelli	Center	Stanford
12	7	107	Jim Coughlan	End	Santa Clara
13	7	117	Prescott Hutchins	Guard	Oregon State
14	7	127	Art Means	Guard	Washington
15	7	137	Gene Hodge	End	Texas A&M–Commerce
16	7	147	Bill Lazetich	Wingback	Montana
17	7	157	Ralph Niehaus	Tackle	Dayton
18	7	167	Dutch Niemant	Back	New Mexico
19	7	177	Tony Tonelli	Center	USC
20	7	187	Jim McDonald	Center	Illinois
21	2	192	Merrill Waters	End	BYU
22	2	197	Al Howe	Tackle	Xavier

== 1940 draft ==
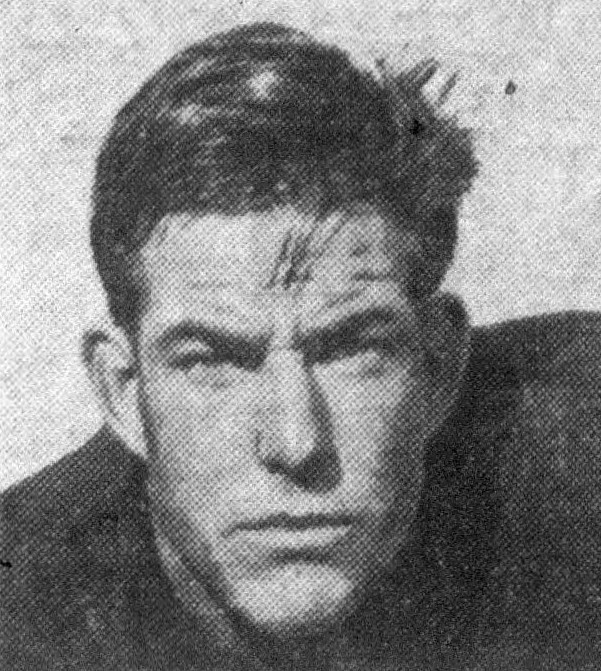
Bill Fisk was the Lions' third-round selection in the 1940 draft.

Detroit Lions' selections in the 1940 NFL draftSource: Pro Football Reference
Round	Pick #	Overall	Name	Position	College
1	6	6	Doyle Nave	Back	USC
3	6	21	Bill Fisk	End	USC
5	6	36	Harry Smith	Tackle	USC
6	6	46	Jim Rike	Center	Tennessee
7	6	56	Bob Winslow	Defensive end	USC
8	6	66	Bill Tranavitch	Back	Rutgers
9	6	76	Bob Haas	Tackle	Missouri
10	6	86	Leon DeWitte	Back	Purdue
11	6	96	Erwin Prasse	End	Iowa
12	6	106	Ken Binder	Back	Carnegie Mellon
13	6	116	Justin Bowers	Tackle	Oklahoma
14	6	126	Jack Morlock	Wingback	Marshall
15	6	136	Stillman Rouse	End	Missouri
16	6	146	Jack Padley	Back	Dayton
17	6	156	Johnny Hackenbruck	Tackle	Oregon State
18	6	166	Frank Ribar	Guard	Duke
19	6	176	Herb McCarthy	Back	Denver
20	6	186	Dub Parten	Tackle	Centenary
21	1	191	Malvern Morgan	Center	Auburn
22	1	196	Bob Orf	End	Missouri

== 1941 draft ==
Augie Lio was the Lions' fourth-round selection in the 1941 draft.

Alex Schibanoff was the Lions' fourteenth-round selection in the 1941 draft.

Detroit Lions' selections in the 1941 NFL draftSource: Pro Football Reference
Round	Pick #	Overall	Name	Position	College
1	5	5	Jim Thomason	Wingback	Texas A&M
2	5	15	Gene Goodreault	End	Boston College
3	5	20	Harry Hopp	Back	Nebraska
4	5	30	Augie Lio	Guard	Georgetown
5	5	35	Robert Nelson	Center	Baylor
6	5	45	John Tripson	Tackle	Mississippi State
7	5	55	John Jett	End	Wake Forest
8	5	65	Joseph Manzo	Tackle	Boston College
9	5	75	Jasper Davis	Back	Duke
10	5	85	Ted Pavelec	Guard	Detroit Mercy
11	5	95	Milt Piepul	Fullback	Notre Dame
12	5	105	Billy Jefferson	Halfback	Mississippi State
13	5	115	Maurice Britt	End	Arkansas
14	5	125	Alex Schibanoff	Tackle	Franklin & Marshall
15	5	135	Perry Scott	End	Muhlenberg
16	5	145	George Sarris	Center	Providence
17	5	155	Fred Gage	Back	Wisconsin
18	5	165	Charlie Ishmael	Back	Kentucky
19	5	175	Len Isberg	Back	Oregon
20	5	185	Paul Friedlander	Back	Carnegie Mellon

== 1942 draft ==
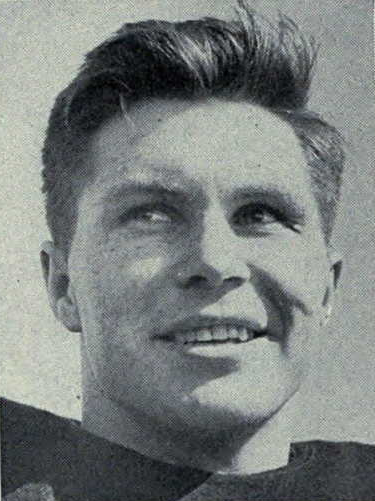
Bob Westfall was the Lions' first-round selection in the 1942 draft.

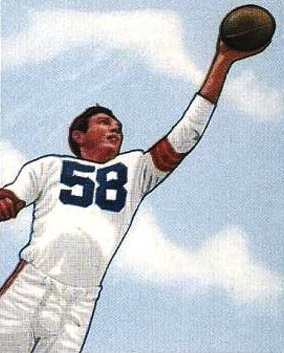
Hall of Fame end Mac Speedie was the Lions' fifteenth-round selection in the 1942 draft.

Detroit Lions' selections in the 1942 NFL draftSource: Pro Football Reference
Round	Pick #	Overall	Name	Position	College
1	5	5	Bob Westfall	Fullback	Michigan
2	5	15	Alf Bauman	Defensive tackle	Northwestern
3	5	20	Bob Dethman	Back	Oregon State
4	5	30	Mickey Sanzotta	Back	Case Western Reserve
5	5	35	Joe Blalock	End	Clemson
6	5	45	Murray Evans	Blocking back	Hardin–Simmons
7	5	55	Tommy Colella	Halfback	Canisius
8	5	65	Joe Franceski	Tackle	Scranton
9	5	75	Emil Banjavic	Wingback	Arizona
10	5	85	Bill Diehl	Center	Iowa
11	5	95	John Polanski	Fullback	Wake Forest
12	5	105	Joe Stringfellow	Tailback	Southern Miss
13	5	115	Tony Arena	Center	Michigan State
14	5	125	Wolf Heinberg	Tackle	UC Santa Barbara
15	5	135	Mac Speedie †	End	Utah
16	5	145	Firman Bynum	Tackle	Arkansas
17	5	155	Dick Fisher	Back	Ohio State
18	5	165	George Speth	Tackle	Murray State
19	5	175	Blair Heaton	End	Susquehanna
20	5	185	Ben Collins	Back	West Texas A&M

== 1943 draft ==
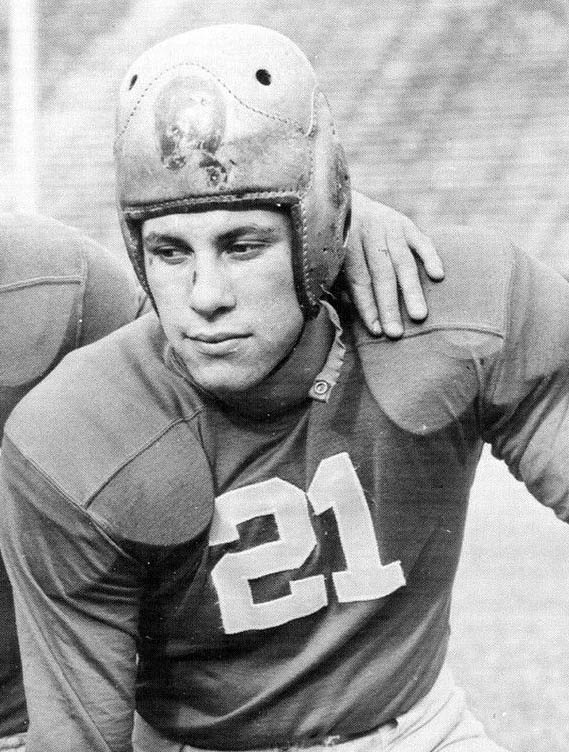
Frank Sinkwich was selected first overall in the 1943 draft.

Detroit Lions' selections in the 1943 NFL draftSource: Pro Football Reference
Round	Pick #	Overall	Name	Position	College
1	1	1	Frank Sinkwich	Back	Georgia
2	1	11	Dave Schreiner	End	Wisconsin
3	1	16	Dick Ashcom	Tackle	Oregon
4	1	26	Ralph Hamer	Back	Furman
5	1	31	Lloyd Wickett	Tackle	Oregon State
6	1	41	Jim Jones	Tackle	Union (TN)
7	1	51	Paul Sizemore	End	Furman
8	1	61	George Poschner	End	Georgia
9	1	71	Jack Irish	Tackle	Arizona
10	1	81	Jack Fenton	Back	Michigan State
11	1	91	Dick Renfro	Fullback	Washington State
12	1	101	Bob Kolesar	Guard	Michigan
13	1	111	Del Huntsinger	Back	Portland
14	1	121	Ellard Dernoncourt	End	Saint Louis
15	1	131	Dick Woodward	End	Colorado
16	1	141	Marv Bass	Tackle	William & Mary
17	1	151	Vic Peelish	Guard	West Virginia
18	1	161	Chet Maeda	Halfback	Colorado State
19	1	171	Bert Kuczynski	End	Pennsylvania
20	1	181	Al Scanland	Back	Oklahoma State
21	1	191	Ace Lohry	Back	Iowa State
22	1	201	Percy Holland	Guard	LSU
23	1	211	Mike Fitzgerald	Guard	Missouri
24	1	221	Bill Remington	Center	Washington State
25	1	231	Huel Hamm	Back	Oklahoma
26	1	241	Irv Konopka	Tackle	Idaho
27	1	251	Chuck Fears	Tackle	UCLA
28	1	261	Bert Ekern	End	Missouri
29	1	271	Virgil Wagner	Back	Millikin
30	1	281	Manny Kaplan	Back	Western Maryland

== 1944 draft ==
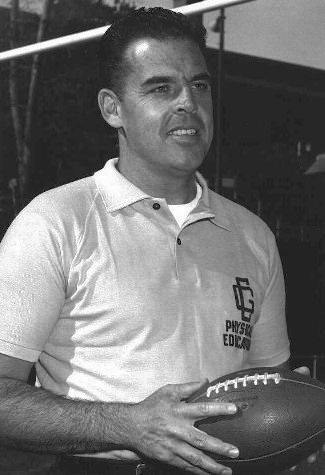
Hall of Fame quarterback Otto Graham was the Lions' first-round selection in the 1944 draft.

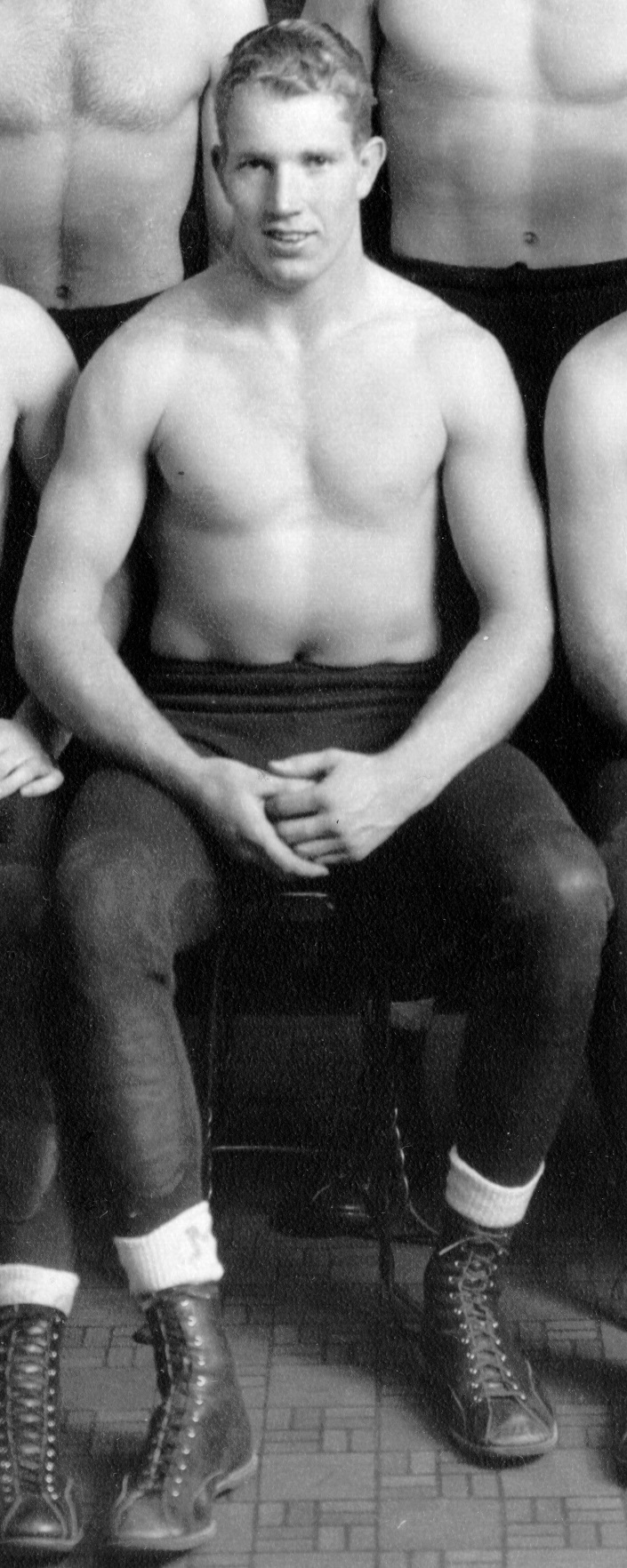
John Greene was the Lions' fifth-round selection in the 1944 draft.

Detroit Lions' selections in the 1944 NFL draftSource: Pro Football Reference
Round	Pick #	Overall	Name	Position	College
1	4	4	Otto Graham †	Quarterback	Northwestern
2	3	14	Bob Cifers	Halfback	Tennessee
3	3	19	Ralph Heywood	End	USC
4	3	30	George Bettridge	Back	Utah
5	3	35	John Greene	End	Michigan
6	3	46	Ed Alliquie	Tackle	Santa Clara
7	3	57	Paul Briggs	Tackle	Colorado
8	3	68	Red Giske	Guard	Washington State
9	3	79	Matthew Bolger	End	Notre Dame
10	3	90	Herb Hein	End	Minnesota
11	3	101	Paul White	Halfback	Michigan
12	3	112	Jack Lescoulie	Guard	UCLA
13	3	123	Doug Rehor	Back	Dickinson
14	3	134	Bill Pritula	Center	Michigan
15	3	145	Jim Molich	End	Fresno State
16	3	156	Jules Yakapovich	Back	Colgate
17	3	167	Jack Helms	Defensive end	Georgia Tech
18	3	178	Elmer Madarik	Halfback	Detroit Mercy
19	3	189	Bill Eubank	End	Mississippi State
20	3	200	Ray Ahlstrom	Back	Saint Mary's (CA)
21	3	211	Alex Kapter	Guard	Northwestern
22	3	222	Vic Clark	Back	Texas-El Paso
23	3	233	Max Fischer	Center	Oklahoma
24	3	244	Chuck Jacoby	Back	Indiana
25	3	255	Bob McCarthy	End	Saint Mary's (CA)
26	3	266	Stan Hendrickson	End	Colorado
27	3	277	Fred Bouldin	Back	Missouri
28	3	288	Dick McElwee	Back	West Virginia
29	3	299	Robert Derleth	Tackle	Michigan
30	3	310	George Dick	End	Kansas

== 1945 draft ==
Detroit Lions' selections in the 1945 NFL draftSource: Pro Football Reference
Round	Pick #	Overall	Name	Position	College
1	6	6	Frank Szymanski	Center	Notre Dame
3	8	24	Stan Mohrbacher	Guard	Iowa
5	7	39	Bob Wiese	Back	Michigan
6	6	49	Gene Fekete	Fullback	Ohio State
7	8	62	Mike Jarmoluk	Defensive tackle	Temple
8	7	72	Jackie Lowther	Back	Detroit Mercy
9	6	82	Les Joop	Tackle	Illinois
10	8	95	Paul Walker	End	Yale
11	7	105	Howie Hansen	Tackle	Utah State
12	6	115	Mike Kasap	Tackle	Purdue
13	8	128	Wally Hopp	Back	Nebraska
14	7	138	Ben Trickey	Back	Iowa
15	6	148	Windell Williams	End	Louisiana
16	8	161	Wayne Flanigan	End	Denver
17	7	171	O. J. Key	Back	Tulane
18	6	181	Jim McWhorter	Back	Alabama
19	8	194	Clyde LeForce	Quarterback	Tulsa
20	7	204	Mike Castronis	Guard	Georgia
21	6	214	Ken Currier	Guard	Wisconsin
22	8	227	Jack Verutti	Back	Saint Mary's (CA)
23	7	237	Ray Olsen	Back	Tulane
24	6	247	Russ Morrow	Center	Tennessee
25	8	260	Stan Green	Tackle	Oklahoma
26	7	270	Bob Ivory	Guard	Detroit Mercy
27	6	280	Dell Taylor	Back	Tulsa
28	8	293	Len Ciesla	Back	Creighton
29	7	303	Frank Lopp	Tackle	Wisconsin
30	6	313	Paul Limont	End	Notre Dame
31	3	321	Ben Schadler	Back	Northwestern
32	2	326	Tom Dorais	Back	Detroit Mercy

== 1946 draft ==
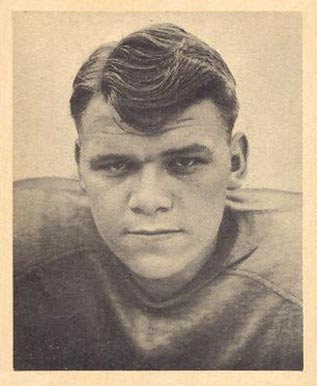
Russ Thomas was the Lions' third-round selection in the 1946 draft. In 1967, he become the general manager of the franchise. He held that position for 22 seasons, with his final season being in 1988.

Ned Maloney was the Lions' twenty-first-round selection in the 1946 draft.

Detroit Lions' selections in the 1946 NFL draftSource: Pro Football Reference
Round	Pick #	Overall	Name	Position	College
1	8	8	Bill Dellastatious	Back	Missouri
3	7	22	Russ Thomas	Tackle	Ohio State
5	8	38	Dave Harris	End	Wake Forest
6	7	47	Joe Eddins	Guard	Auburn
7	8	58	Pete Berezney	Tackle	Notre Dame
8	7	67	Keith DeCourcey	Back	Washington
9	8	78	Bill Hedges	Tackle	West Texas A&M
10	7	87	Thornton Dixon	Tackle	Ohio State
11	8	98	Bob Stevens	Back	Oregon State
12	7	107	Pat Farris	Tackle	Texas Tech
13	8	118	Paul Copoulos	Back	Marquette
14	7	127	Ty Irby	Back	Auburn
15	8	138	Pat Thrash	End	South Carolina
16	7	147	Kelley Mote	End	Duke
17	8	158	Bill Scrugg	Back	Rice
18	7	167	Ben Wall	Back	Central Michigan
19	8	178	Merlin Kispert	Back	Minnesota
20	7	187	Don Malmberg	Tackle	UCLA
21	8	198	Ned Maloney	End	Purdue
22	7	207	Jack Simmons	Center	Detroit Mercy
23	8	218	Joe Pulte	End	Detroit Mercy
24	7	227	Bob Funderberg	Back	Northwestern
25	8	238	Ed Stacco	Tackle	Colgate
26	7	247	Roger Anderson	Guard	Oregon State
27	8	258	Chuck Murdock	End	Georgia Tech
28	7	267	Dick Van Dusen	Center	Minnesota
29	8	278	Bill Agnew	Back	California
30	7	287	Tom Panos	Guard	Utah
31	3	293	Orlando Palesse	End	Marquette
32	2	297	Otis Schellstede	Guard	Oklahoma State

== 1947 draft ==
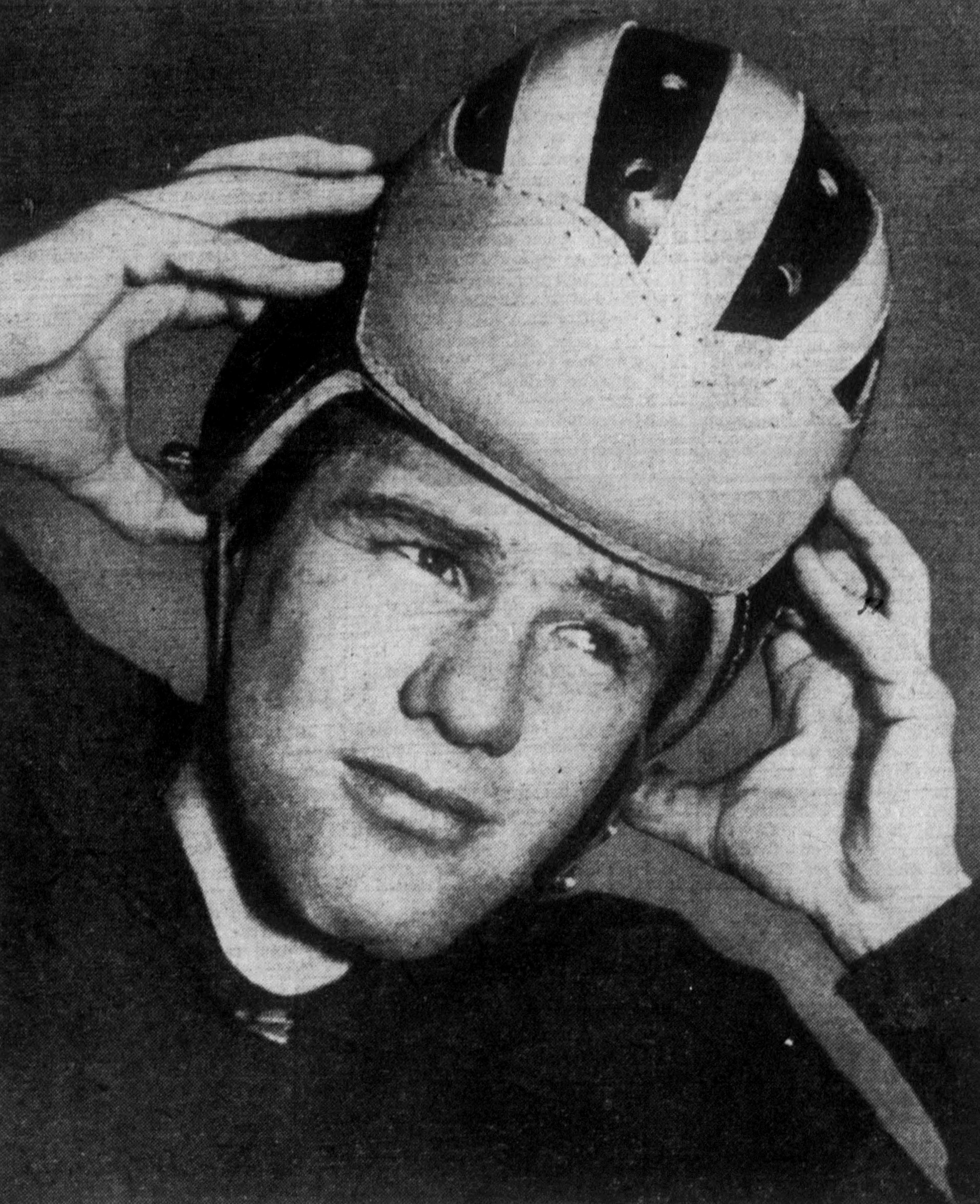
Bump Elliott was the Lions' tenth-round selection in the 1947 draft.

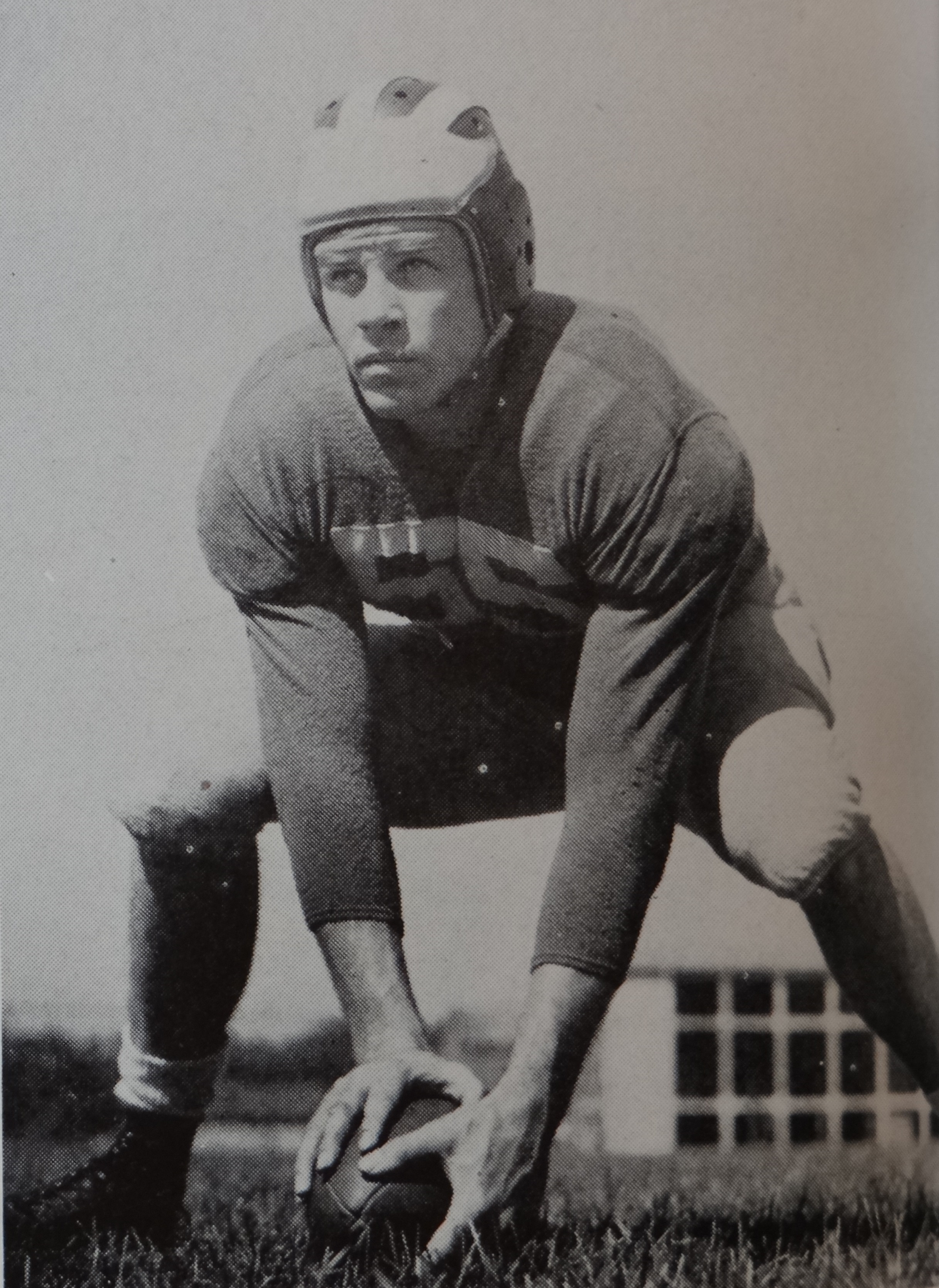
J. T. White was the Lions' twenty-first-round selection in the 1947 draft.

Detroit Lions' selections in the 1947 NFL draftSource: Pro Football Reference
Round	Pick #	Overall	Name	Position	College
1	2	2	Glenn Davis	Halfback	Army
2	1	12	Russ Thomas	Tackle	Ohio State
3	1	14	Jim Kekeris	Tackle	Missouri
4	1	24	Charley Hoover	Center	Vanderbilt
5	1	26	Bob Chappuis	Tailback	Michigan
6	1	36	Bernie Gallagher	Guard	Pennsylvania
7	1	46	Ed Grain	Guard	Pennsylvania
8	1	56	Harvey James	Center	Miami (FL)
9	1	66	Kale Alexander	Tackle	South Carolina
10	1	76	Bump Elliott	Back	Michigan
11	1	86	Pete Sullivan	Tackle	Detroit Mercy
12	1	96	LaVerne Camarata	Back	Iowa State
13	1	106	Walt Vezmar	Guard	Michigan State
14	1	116	Dick Hagen	End	Washington
15	1	126	J. W. Meeks	Back	Texas A&M–Commerce
16	1	136	Reed Nilsen	Center	BYU
17	1	146	Tommy James	Defensive back	Ohio State
18	1	156	Ralph Maughan	End	Utah State
19	1	166	Buryl Baty	Back	Texas A&M
20	1	176	Elmer Madar	End	Michigan
21	1	186	J. T. White	End	Michigan
22	1	196	Carl Schuette	Linebacker	Marquette
23	1	206	Steve Cipot	Tackle	St. Bonaventure
24	1	216	Bill Cadenhead	Back	Alabama
25	1	226	Jim Cody	Tackle	Texas A&M–Commerce
26	1	236	Earl Maves	Wingback	Wisconsin
27	1	246	Bill Hillman	Back	Tennessee
28	1	256	Arch Kelly	End	Detroit Mercy
29	1	266	Bob Tulis	Tackle	Texas A&M
30	1	276	Howard McAfee	Tackle	Tulane

== 1948 draft ==
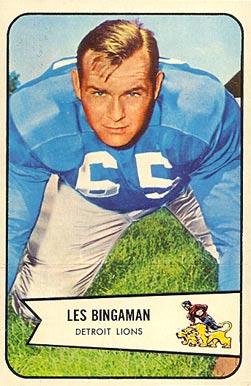
Les Bingaman was the Lions' third-round selection in the 1948 draft.

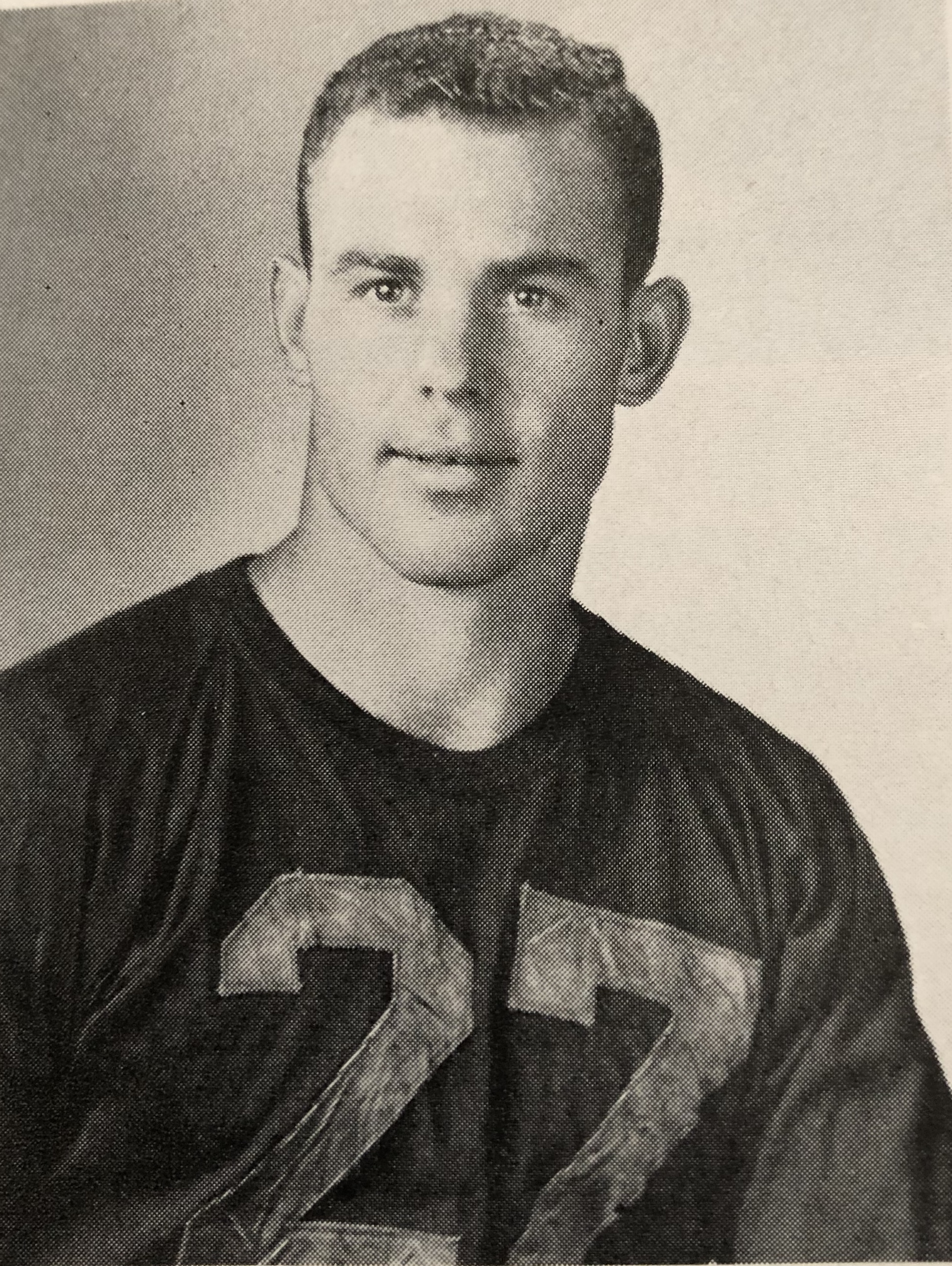
Don Doll was the Lions' ninth-round selection in the 1948 draft.

Detroit Lions' selections in the 1948 NFL draftSource: Pro Football Reference
Round	Pick #	Overall	Name	Position	College
1	6	6	Y. A. Tittle †	Quarterback	LSU
2	2	13	George Quist	Back	Stanford
3	2	15	Les Bingaman	Defensive guard	Illinois
4	2	25	Jim Minor	Tackle	Arkansas
6	2	37	Bob Williamson	Tackle	Hobart
7	2	47	Fred Enke	Quarterback	Arizona
7	8	53	Moroni Schwab	Tackle	Utah State
9	2	67	Don Doll	Defensive back	USC
10	2	77	Paul Cleary	End	USC
11	2	87	Fred Land	Tackle	LSU
13	2	107	Russ Steger	Back	Illinois
14	2	117	Hal Enstice	Back	Union (NY)
15	2	127	Pete Elliott	Back	Michigan
16	2	137	Dave Templeton	Guard	Ohio State
17	2	147	Quentin Sickels	Guard	Michigan
18	2	157	Jim Spruill	Tackle	Rice
19	2	167	Barney Hafen	Defensive end	Utah
20	2	177	Aldo Dellosobelle	Tackle	Loyola Marymount
21	2	187	Dean Dill	Back	USC
22	2	197	Jack McEwen	Back	Colorado
23	2	207	Rebel Steiner	End	Alabama
24	2	217	Joe Suarez	Guard	Saint Mary's (CA)
25	2	227	Coy McGee	Back	Notre Dame
26	2	237	Phil Alexander	Tackle	South Carolina
27	2	247	Frank Pizza	Tackle	Toledo
28	2	257	George Schutte	Tackle	USC
29	2	267	Tony Pabalis	Back	Central Michigan
30	2	277	Bob McCurry	Center	Michigan State

== 1949 draft ==
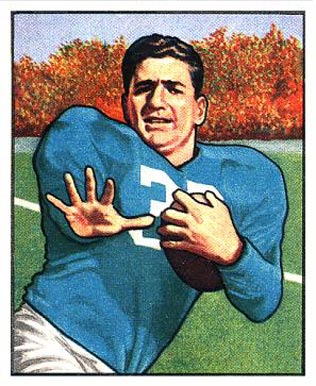
John Panelli was the Lions' second-round selection in the 1949 draft.

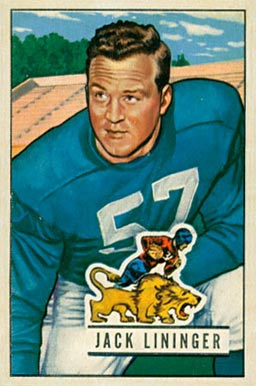
Jack Lininger was the Lions' twenty-first-round selection in the 1949 draft.

Detroit Lions' selections in the 1949 NFL draftSource: Pro Football Reference
Round	Pick #	Overall	Name	Position	College
1	2	2	John Rauch	Quarterback	Georgia
2	1	12	John Panelli	Linebacker	Notre Dame
3	1	22	Lou Kusserow	Linebacker	Columbia
4	1	32	Joe Sullivan	Back	Dartmouth
5	1	42	George Brodnax	End	Georgia Tech
6	1	52	Bob Meinert	Back	Oklahoma State
9	1	82	Chuck Drazenovich	Linebacker	Penn State
10	1	92	Bill Davis	Guard	Duke
11	1	102	Ernie Settembre	Tackle	Miami (FL)
12	1	112	Virgil Boteler	Center	New Mexico
13	1	122	Al Russas	Tackle	Tennessee
14	1	132	Dale Panter	Tackle	Utah State
15	1	142	Bob Pifferini	Center	San Jose State
16	1	152	Kimball Merrill	Tackle	BYU
17	1	162	Zealand Thigpen	Back	Vanderbilt
18	1	172	Bill Wehr	Center	Denison
19	1	182	Wallace Triplett	Halfback	Penn State
20	1	192	Joe Romano	Tackle	North Carolina
21	1	202	Jack Lininger	Linebacker	Ohio State
22	1	212	Gil Tobler	Back	Utah
23	1	222	R. B. Patterson	Guard	Mississippi State
24	1	232	Oswald Clark	End	Michigan
25	1	242	Les Cowan	End	McMurry

== 1950 draft ==
Leon Hart was selected first overall by the Lions in the 1950 draft.

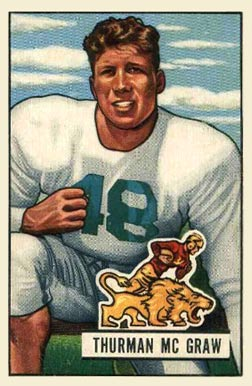
Thurman "Fum" McGraw was the Lions' second-round selection in the 1950 draft.

Detroit Lions' selections in the 1950 NFL draftSource: Pro Football Reference
Round	Pick #	Overall	Name	Position	College
1	1	1	Leon Hart	End	Notre Dame
1	5	5	Joe Watson	Center	Rice
2	13	27	Thurman McGraw	Defensive tackle	Colorado State
3	4	31	Art Murakowski	Fullback	Northwestern
4	4	44	Ernie Kiely	Guard	Texas-El Paso
5	4	57	Hal Fitkin	Back	Dartmouth
6	4	70	Floyd Jaszewski	Tackle	Minnesota
7	4	83	Bill Leverman	Back	St. Edward's
8	4	96	Ralph McAlister	Back	Minnesota
9	4	109	Ed Wood	Guard	Detroit Mercy
10	4	122	Roland Malcolm	Back	Gustavus Adolphus
11	4	135	Jack Wilson	Tackle	Ohio State
12	4	148	Bucky Walters	Tackle	Brown
13	4	161	Jim Ryan	Back	San Francisco
14	4	174	Cliff Squires	Center	Nebraska Wesleyan
15	4	187	Tom Worthington	Back	Northwestern
16	4	200	Jerry Greiner	Center	Detroit Mercy
17	4	213	Connie Callahan	Back	Morningside
18	4	226	Don Stansauk	Defensive tackle	Denver
19	4	239	Gus Cifelli	Tackle	Notre Dame
20	4	252	Fred Davis	End	Maryland
21	4	265	George Brewer	Back	Oklahoma
22	4	278	Jim Tate	Tackle	Purdue
23	4	291	Irv Heller	Tackle	Boston University
24	4	304	Jim McDowell	Guard	William & Mary
25	4	317	Gene Glick	Back	Michigan State
26	4	330	Bobby Coy Lee	Back	Texas
27	4	343	Elbert Johnson	End	Texas Tech
28	4	356	Johnny Karras	Back	Illinois
29	4	369	Russ Steger	Back	Illinois
30	4	382	Rube DeRoin	Center	Oklahoma State

== 1950 AAFC dispersal draft ==
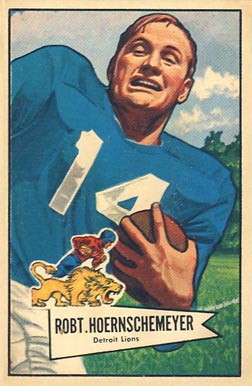
Robert Hoernschemeyer was the Lions' first-round selection in the 1950 AAFC dispersal draft.

Detroit Lions AAFC dispersal draft selections in 1950Source: ProFootballResearchers.org
Round	Pick #	Overall	Name	Position	AAFC Team
1	4	4	Robert Hoernschemeyer	Halfback	Chicago Hornets
2	4	17	Lou Creekmur	Tackle	Los Angeles Dons (Note: Lou Creekmur was drafted by the Philadelphia Eagles in the 1948 NFL draft and the Los Angeles Dons in the 1948 AAFC draft but never signed for either team, choosing instead to return to the College of William & Mary to complete his master's degree. As a result, Creekmur was placed into the player pool for the 1950 AAFC dispersal draft.)
3	4	30	Bob Jensen	End	Chicago Hornets
4	4	47	William Kay	Tackle	Buffalo Bills
5	4	60	Richard Rifenberg	End	New York Yankees
6	4	75	Joyce Pipkin	End	Los Angeles Dons
7	4	88	George Benigni	End	Chicago Hornets
8	4	103	Gerald Morrical	Tackle	New York Yankees
9	4	116	Warren Huey	End	Chicago Hornets
10	4	131	Ray Coates	Halfback	New York Giants

== 1951 draft ==
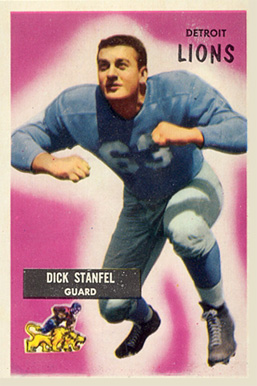
Hall of Fame guard Dick Stanfel was the Lions' second-round selection in the 1951 draft.

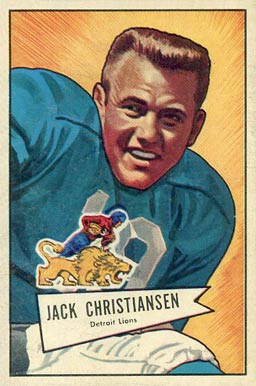
Hall of Fame defensive back Jack Christiansen was the Lions' sixth-round selection in the 1951 draft.

Detroit Lions' selections in the 1951 NFL draftSource: Pro Football Reference
Round	Pick #	Overall	Name	Position	College
2	5	19	Dick Stanfel †	Guard	San Francisco
3	7	33	Dorne Dibble	End	Michigan State
4	6	44	Pete D'Alonzo	Fullback	Villanova
5	5	55	Jim Doran	End	Iowa State
5	8	58	LaVern Torgeson	Linebacker	Washington State
6	7	69	Jack Christiansen †	Defensive back	Colorado State
7	6	80	Bob Momsen	Middle guard	Ohio State
8	5	91	Dick Raklovits	Back	Illinois
10	7	117	Jim Shoaf	Guard	LSU
11	5	128	Frankie Anderson	End	Oklahoma
13	6	153	Wayne Siegert	Tackle	Illinois
14	5	164	Lee Wittmer	Tackle	Detroit Mercy
15	7	178	Jim Hill	Defensive back	Tennessee
16	6	189	Ted Geremsky	End	Pittsburgh
17	5	200	Darrel Meisenheimer	Defensive back	Oklahoma State
18	7	214	Eddie Wolgast	Back	Arizona
19	6	225	Gordy Hanson	Tackle	Washington State
20	5	236	Harry Gibbons	Back	South Dakota State
21	7	250	King Block	Back	Idaho
22	6	261	Dan Foldberg	End	Army
23	5	272	Dick Gabriel	Back	Lehigh
24	7	286	George Buksar	Back	San Francisco
25	6	297	Dick Harris	Center	Texas
26	5	308	Frank Kazmierski	Center	West Virginia
27	7	322	Harry Allis	End	Michigan
28	6	333	Dick Peot	Tackle	South Dakota State
29	5	344	Bruce Womack	Guard	West Texas A&M
30	7	358	Ron Horwath	Back	Detroit Mercy

== 1952 draft ==
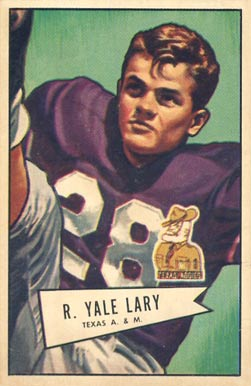
Hall of Fame safety and punter Yale Lary was the Lions' third-round selection in the 1952 draft.

Detroit Lions' selections in the 1952 NFL draftSource: Pro Football Reference
Round	Pick #	Overall	Name	Position	College
3	9	34	Yale Lary †	Defensive back	Texas A&M
4	8	45	Pat Summerall	Defensive end	Arkansas
5	9	58	Bob Miller	Defensive tackle	Virginia
6	8	69	Gordon Cooper	End	Denver
7	9	82	Wes Gardner	Center	Utah
8	8	93	Tom Dublinski	Quarterback	Utah
9	9	106	Sonny Gandee	Linebacker	Ohio State
10	8	117	Steve Dowden	Tackle	Baylor
11	9	130	Keith Flowers	Center	TCU
12	8	141	Jim Roshto	Back	LSU
13	9	154	Carroll McDonald	Center	Florida
14	8	165	Ray Oliverson	Back	BYU
15	9	178	John Burgamy	Guard	Georgia
17	9	202	Hank Lauricella	Halfback	Tennessee
18	8	213	Stan Campbell	Guard	Iowa State
19	9	226	Blaine Earon	Defensive end	Duke
20	8	237	Gil Mains	Defensive tackle	Murray State
21	9	250	Showboat Boykin	Back	Mississippi
22	8	261	Jim David	Defensive back	Colorado State
23	9	274	Hal Maxwell	End	Mississippi
24	8	285	Bob Werckle	Tackle	Vanderbilt
25	9	298	Byron Bailey	Halfback	Washington State
26	8	309	Buddy Terry	End	Stephen F. Austin
27	9	322	Bob Trout	End	Baylor
28	8	333	Hal Turner	Defensive end	Tennessee State
29	9	346	Art Hudson	Back	Western Illinois
30	8	357	Ray Don Dillon	Back	Prairie View A&M

== 1953 draft ==
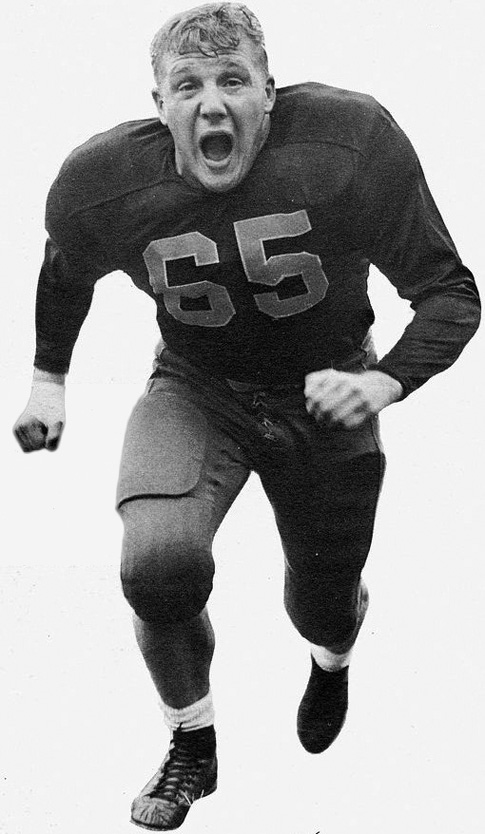
Hall of Fame linebacker Joe Schmidt was selected in the seventh round by the Lions in the 1953 draft.

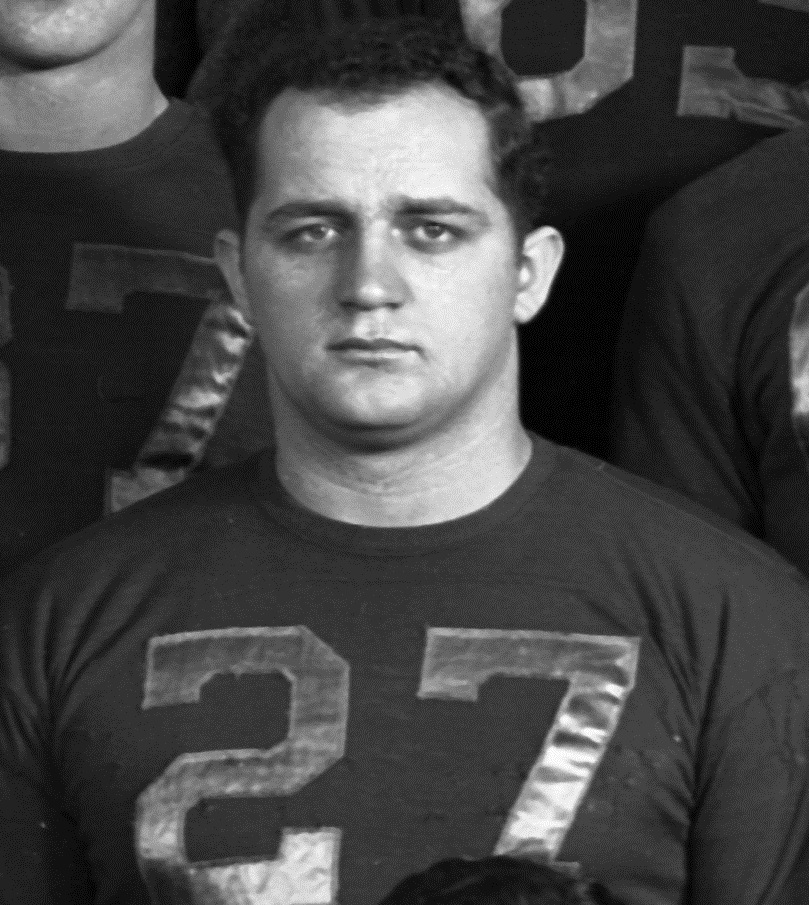
Ted Topor was the Lions' fifteenth-round selection in the 1953 draft.

Detroit Lions' selections in the 1953 NFL draftSource: Pro Football Reference
Round	Pick #	Overall	Name	Position	College
1	13	13	Harley Sewell	Guard	Texas
2	12	25	Gene Gedman	Halfback	Indiana
4	12	50	Charlie Ane	Tackle	USC
6	12	74	Ollie Spencer	Tackle	Kansas
7	12	86	Joe Schmidt †	Linebacker	Pittsburgh
8	12	98	Lew Carpenter	Halfback	Arkansas
9	12	110	Carlton McCormack	Center	TCU
10	12	122	Dreher Gaskin	End	Clemson
11	12	134	Elmer Messenger	Guard	Washington State
12	12	146	Larry Spencer	Back	Wake Forest
13	12	158	Bob Thomas	End	Washington and Lee
14	12	170	Jack Barger	Tackle	New Mexico
15	12	182	Ted Topor	Linebacker	Michigan
16	12	194	Bob Volonnino	Guard	Army/Villanova
17	12	206	Ray Green	Tackle	Duke
18	12	218	Ed Mioduszewski	Quarterback	William & Mary
19	12	230	Paul Held	Quarterback	San Jose State
20	12	242	Gerry Hart	Tackle	Army/Mississippi
21	12	254	Bob Tata	Back	Virginia
22	12	266	Pete Retzlaff	End	South Dakota State
23	12	278	Carl Karilivacz	Defensive back	Syracuse
24	12	290	Truett Grant	Tackle	Duke
25	12	302	Marv Brown	Halfback	Texas A&M–Commerce
26	12	314	Jim Dooley	Center	Penn State
27	12	326	Jackie Parker	Back	Mississippi State
28	12	338	Laurin Pepper	Back	Southern Miss
29	12	350	Harley Rector	Tackle	Wayne State (NE)
30	11	361	Hal Maus	End	Montana

== 1954 draft ==
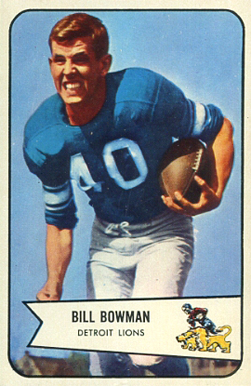
Bill Bowman was the Lions' third-round selection in the 1954 draft.

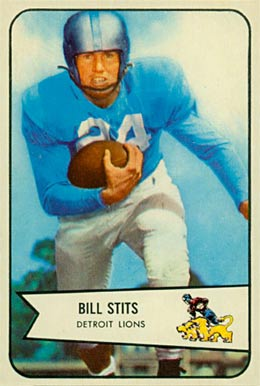
Bill Stits was the Lions' fourth-round selection in the 1954 draft.

Detroit Lions' selections in the 1954 NFL draftSource: Pro Football Reference
Round	Pick #	Overall	Name	Position	College
1	13	13	Dick Chapman	Tackle	Rice
2	12	25	Jim Neal	Center	Michigan State
3	12	37	Bill Bowman	Fullback	William & Mary
4	7	44	Bill Stits	Defensive back	UCLA
4	12	49	Howard McCants	End	Washington State
5	12	61	George Parozzo	Tackle	William & Mary
6	2	63	Pence Dacus	Back	Texas State
6	12	73	Dick Kercher	Halfback	Tulsa
7	12	85	Jack Cross	Back	Utah
8	12	97	Milt Davis	Defensive back	UCLA
9	12	109	Bob Lawson	Back	Cal Poly-San Luis Obispo
10	12	121	Jack Carroll	End	Holy Cross
11	12	133	Milt Schwenk	Tackle	Washington State
12	12	145	Bob Hartman	Tackle	Oregon State
13	12	157	Jim Swierczek	Back	Marshall
14	12	169	Ray Novak	Back	Nebraska
15	12	181	Kirk Hinderlider	End	Colorado State
16	12	193	Bob Chuoke	Tackle	Houston
17	12	205	Rick Kaser	Back	Toledo
18	12	217	Norm Hayes	Tackle	Idaho
19	12	229	Buster Graves	Tackle	Arkansas
20	12	241	Jim Durrant	Guard	Utah
21	12	253	Jack Kistler	Back	Duke
22	12	265	Dewey Brundage	Defensive end	BYU
23	12	277	Jack Shanafelt	Tackle	Pennsylvania
24	12	289	Bobby Burrows	Guard	Duke
25	12	301	Richie Woit	Defensive back	Arkansas State
26	12	313	Jim George	Tackle	Syracuse
27	12	325	Dick Rzeszut	Center	Benedictine
28	12	337	Dolph Rutschman	Back	Linfield
29	12	349	Mel Bertrand	Center	Idaho
30	11	360	Ellis Horton	Back	Eureka

== 1955 draft ==
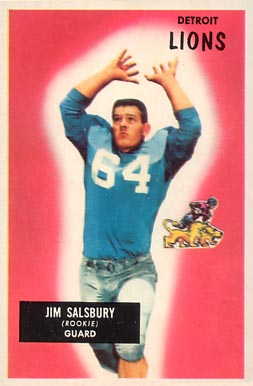
Jim Salsbury was the Lions' second-round selection in the 1955 draft.

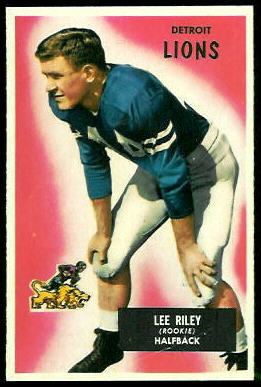
Lee Riley was one of the Lions' fourth-round selections in the 1955 draft.

Detroit Lions' selections in the 1955 NFL draftSource: Pro Football Reference
Round	Pick #	Overall	Name	Position	College
1	12	12	Dave Middleton	End	Auburn
2	11	24	Jim Salsbury	Guard	UCLA
3	11	36	Darris McCord	Defensive end	Tennessee
4	2	39	Gordon Malloy	Back	Miami (FL)
4	11	48	Lee Riley	Defensive back	Detroit Mercy
5	11	60	Bud Brooks	Guard	Arkansas
6	11	72	Elijah Childers	Tackle	Prairie View A&M
7	11	84	Bert Zagers	Defensive back	Michigan State
8	5	90	Leon Cunningham	Linebacker	South Carolina
8	11	96	Bill Walker	End	Maryland
8	12	97	Lamoine Holland	End	Rice
9	11	108	Walt Jenkins	Defensive end	Wayne State
10	11	120	Tom Gastall	Back	Boston University
11	11	132	Herb McDermott	Tackle	Iowa State
12	11	144	Dick Goist	Back	Cincinnati
13	11	156	Don Henderson	Tackle	Utah
14	11	168	Jerry Gajda	Back	Benedictine
15	11	180	George Atkins	Guard	Auburn
16	11	192	Al Marr	End	Bradley
17	11	204	Don Daly	Back	Eastern Kentucky
18	11	216	Pat Oleksiak	Back	Tennessee
19	11	228	Bob Muller	Center	Eastern Kentucky
20	11	240	Fred Mahaffey	Back	Denver
21	11	252	Jim Walters	Tackle	Mississippi
22	11	264	George Albrecht	Back	Maryland
23	11	276	George Galuska	Back	Wyoming
24	11	288	Bob Flacke	Guard	Holy Cross
25	11	300	Dick Miller	Tackle	Illinois
26	11	312	Duncan McDonald	Back	Michigan
27	11	324	Mike Troka	Back	Trinity (CT)
28	11	336	Harry Lovell	Guard	South Carolina
29	11	348	Bill Dearing	Back	Florida
30	10	359	Charley Hatch	End	Utah State

== 1956 draft ==
Detroit Lions' selections in the 1956 NFL draftSource: Pro Football Reference
Round	Pick #	Overall	Name	Position	College
1	3	3	Howard Cassady	Halfback	Ohio State
3	2	27	Don McIlhenny	Halfback	SMU
4	1	38	Jerry Reichow	End	Iowa
5	1	50	Tom Tracy	Halfback	Tennessee
6	1	62	Bob Lusk	Center	William & Mary
7	1	74	Gene Cronin	Defensive end	Pacific
8	1	86	Jack Powell	Tackle	Texas A&M
9	1	98	Calvin Jones	Guard	Iowa
10	1	110	Joe Silas	Defensive end	South Carolina
11	1	122	Lew Wacker	Back	Richmond
11	3	124	Tom Selep	Back	Maryland
12	1	134	R. B. Nunnery	Tackle	LSU
13	1	146	O. K. Ferguson	Back	LSU
14	1	158	Ronnie Falls	Linebacker	Duke
15	1	170	Buzzy Allert	Defensive end	Texas State
16	1	182	Len Zyzda	Defensive end	Purdue
17	1	194	Ken Wind	End	Houston
18	1	206	Emidio Petrarca	Back	Boston College
19	1	218	Dale Vaughn	Back	VMI
20	1	230	Joe Stephenson	End	Vanderbilt
21	1	242	Bob Blechen	Center	Whittier
22	1	254	Dick Marazza	Tackle	Clemson
23	1	266	Bob Garrard	Back	Georgia
24	1	278	Jarv Walz	End	Central Michigan
25	1	290	Jerry Hall	Back	Rice
26	1	302	Joe Walden	Back	West Texas A&M
27	1	314	Bryan Burnthorne	Guard	Tulane
28	1	326	John Smith	Guard	Northwestern
29	1	338	Doug Peters	Back	UCLA
30	1	350	John Gibbens	Tackle	Texas State

== 1957 draft ==
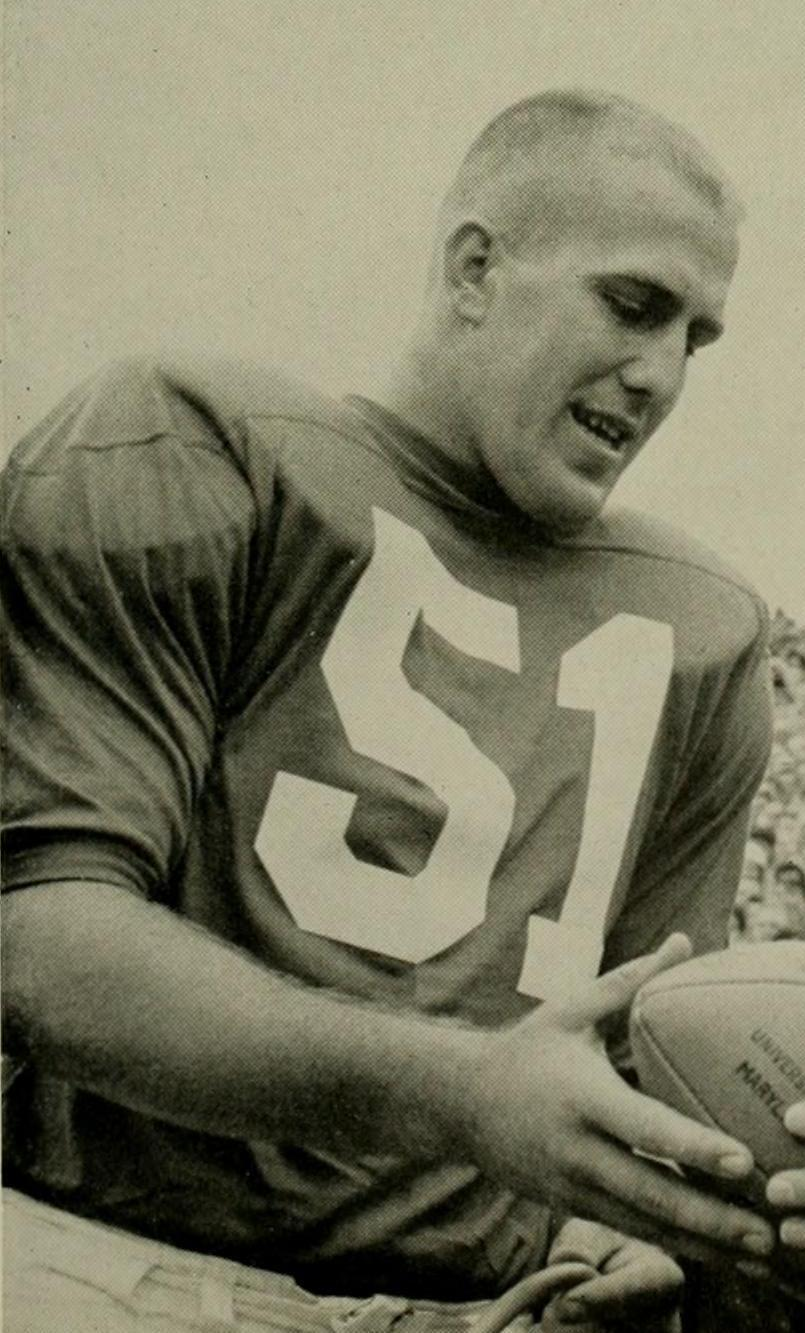
Gene Alderton was the Lions' fifteenth-round selection in the 1957 draft.

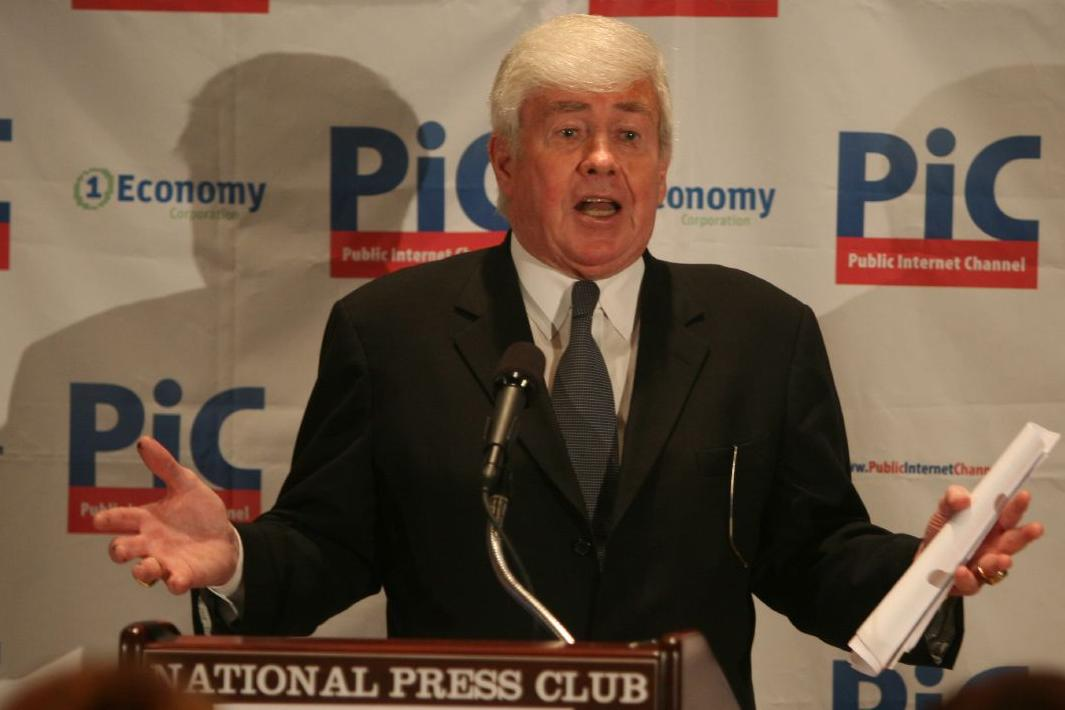
Jack Kemp, pictured here in 2008, was the Lions' seventeenth-round selection in the 1957 draft.

Detroit Lions' selections in the 1957 NFL draftSource: Pro Football Reference
Round	Pick #	Overall	Name	Position	College
1	12	12	Bill Glass	Defensive end	Baylor
2	11	24	John Gordy	Guard	Tennessee
3	11	36	Terry Barr	Halfback	Michigan
4	11	48	Steve Junker	End	Xavier (OH)
5	10	59	John Barrow	Guard	Florida
6	10	71	Ken Russell	Tackle	Bowling Green
7	10	83	Jerry Leahy	Tackle	Colorado
8	10	95	Dave Liddick	Defensive tackle	George Washington
9	10	107	John Nikkel	End	TCU
10	10	119	Tom Rychlec	End	American International
11	10	131	Carl Osterloh	Center	Missouri
12	10	143	Charlie O'Brien	End	Valparaiso
13	10	155	Bill West	Back	Eastern Oregon
14	10	167	Phil Smith	Back	Jacksonville State
15	10	179	Gene Alderton	Center	Maryland
16	10	191	Hillmer Olson	Center	Virginia Tech
17	10	203	Jack Kemp	Quarterback	Occidental
18	10	215	Jay Weenig	Guard	BYU
19	10	227	Bob Gunderman	End	Virginia
20	10	239	Alex Lazzerino	Tackle	South Carolina
21	10	251	Dudley Meredith	Defensive tackle	Lamar
22	10	263	Tom Schulte	End	Eastern Kentucky
23	10	275	George Gillar	Back	Texas A&M
24	10	287	Joe Scales	Back	Vanderbilt
25	10	299	Carl Johnson	Back	South Dakota
26	10	311	Chuck Muelhaupt	Guard	Iowa State
27	10	323	Dick Trafas	End	St. Thomas
28	10	335	Joe Smith	Back	Houston
29	10	347	Hugh Martin	Guard	Pomona
30	9	358	Mike Shill	Tackle	Furman

== 1958 draft ==
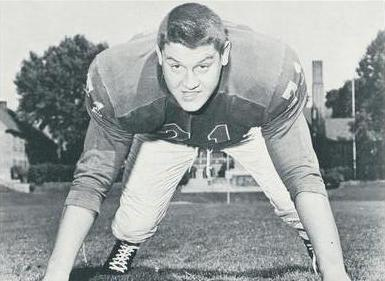
Hall of Fame defensive tackle Alex Karras was selected by the Lions' in the first round of the 1958 draft.

Detroit Lions' selections in the 1958 NFL draftSource: Pro Football Reference
Round	Pick #	Overall	Name	Position	College
1	10	10	Alex Karras †	Defensive tackle	Iowa
4	8	45	Wayne Walker	Linebacker	Idaho
6	12	73	Dan Lewis	Halfback	Wisconsin
7	10	83	Ralph Pfeifer	Back	Kansas State
7	12	85	Hal Outten	Tackle	Virginia
8	7	92	Karl Koepfer	Guard	Bowling Green
8	12	97	Phil Blazer	Guard	North Carolina
9	6	103	Jim Loftin	Back	Alabama
9	12	109	Ben Paolucci	Defensive tackle	Wayne State
10	12	121	Elliot Schaubach	Tackle	William & Mary
11	12	133	Claude Chaney	Back	Dayton
12	12	145	Hal Boutte	End	San Jose State
13	12	157	Barry Maroney	Back	Cincinnati
14	12	169	Ken Webb	Halfback	Presbyterian
15	10	179	John Scheldrup	End	Iowa State
15	12	181	Jerry Mohlman	Back	Benedictine
16	12	193	Gordon Ringquist	Tackle	Central Michigan
17	12	205	Walt Gurasich	Guard	USC
18	7	212	Bill Austin	Center	Auburn
18	12	217	Larry Carrier	Back	Kansas
19	12	229	Dave Bottos	Back	Murray State
20	12	241	Bill Curry	Tackle	Western Kentucky
21	12	253	Jim Wagstaff	Defensive back	Idaho State
22	12	265	Buddy Nidiffer	End	South Carolina
23	12	277	Frank Destino	Back	South Carolina
24	12	289	Dave Whitsell	Defensive back	Indiana
25	12	301	Jim Cook	Back	Auburn
26	12	313	Joe Bruce	Tackle	Middle Tennessee State
27	12	325	Don Agers	Tackle	Missouri S&T
28	12	337	Jack Pitt	End	South Carolina
29	12	349	Henry Herzog	Back	Kentucky
30	11	360	Tommy Bronson	Back	Tennessee

== 1959 draft ==
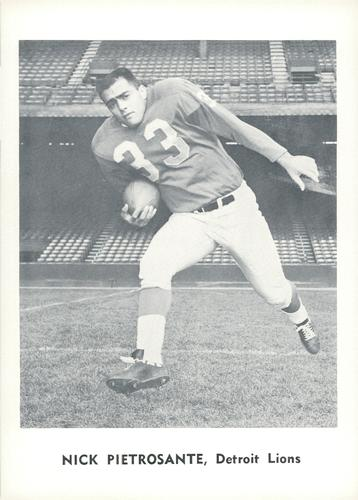
Nick Pietrosante was the Lions' first-round selection in the 1959 draft.

Detroit Lions' selections in the 1959 NFL draftSource: Pro Football Reference
Round	Pick #	Overall	Name	Position	College
1	6	6	Nick Pietrosante	Fullback	Notre Dame
2	6	18	Charley Horton	Guard	Baylor
2	7	19	Mike Rabold	Guard	Indiana
3	6	30	Ron Koes	Center	North Carolina
3	12	36	Ron Luciano	Tackle	Syracuse
4	6	42	Art Brandriff	Back	VMI
4	10	46	Bob Grottkau	Guard	Oregon
6	7	67	Dick Guesman	Defensive tackle	West Virginia
7	5	77	Ben Donnell	Defensive end	Vanderbilt
8	4	88	Jim Lenden	Tackle	Oregon
9	5	101	Carl Smith	Fullback	Tennessee
10	4	112	Jack Laraway	Linebacker	Purdue
11	5	125	Harry Jacobs	Linebacker	Bradley
12	4	136	Ron Stehouwer	Guard	Colorado State
13	5	149	Jim Steffen	Defensive back	UCLA
14	4	160	Jim Baldwin	Center	McMurry
15	5	173	Bruce Maher	Defensive back	Detroit Mercy
16	4	184	George McGee	Tackle	Southern
17	5	197	Jack Rudolph	Linebacker	Georgia Tech
18	4	208	Dave Holden	Tackle	Los Angeles State
19	5	221	Rufus Granderson	Defensive tackle	Prairie View A&M
20	4	232	Dan McGrew	Center	Purdue
21	5	245	Buddy Davis	Back	Richmond
22	4	256	Lebron Shields	Defensive end	Tennessee
23	5	269	Sal Cesario	Tackle	Denver
24	4	280	Fred Riddle	Back	Pittsburgh
25	5	293	Dan Chamberlain	End	Sacramento State
26	4	304	Jim Bradley	Back	Lincoln (MO)
27	5	317	Bill Jerry	Tackle	South Carolina
28	4	328	Vince Matthews	Back	Texas
29	5	341	Dave Sime	End	Duke
30	4	352	Ron Stover	End	Oregon

== 1960 draft ==
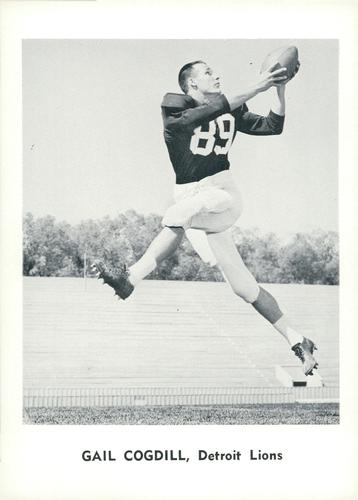
Gail Cogdill was the Lions' sixth-round selection in the 1960 draft.

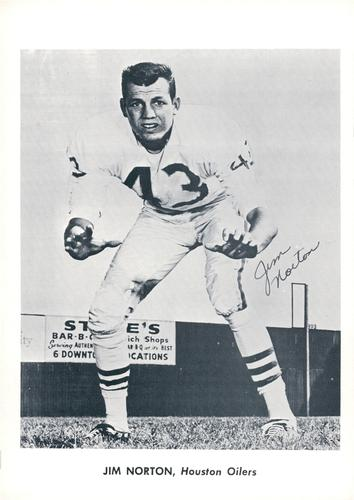
Jim Norton was the Lions' seventh-round selection in the 1960 draft.

Detroit Lions' selections in the 1960 NFL draftSource: Pro Football Reference
Round	Pick #	Overall	Name	Position	College
1	3	3	Johnny Robinson †	Defensive back	LSU
2	3	15	Warren Rabb	Quarterback	LSU
3	3	27	Bob Scholtz	Center	Notre Dame
4	3	39	Jim Andreotti	Center	Northwestern
4	6	42	Roger Brown	Defensive tackle	Maryland Eastern Shore
6	3	63	Gail Cogdill	Split end	Washington State
7	3	75	Jim Norton	Defensive back	Idaho
9	3	99	Max Messner	Linebacker	Cincinnati
10	3	111	Grady Alderman	Tackle	Detroit Mercy
10	9	117	Jim O'Brien	Tackle	Boston College
11	3	123	Ted Aucreman	End	Indiana
12	3	135	Dave Ross	End	Los Angeles State
13	3	147	Pete Tunney	Halfback	Occidental
14	3	159	Jim Glasgow	Tackle	Jacksonville State
15	3	171	Darrell Harper	Halfback	Michigan
16	3	183	Steve Rasso	Back	Cincinnati
17	3	195	Bob Hudson	End	Louisiana Tech
18	3	207	Frank Walton	Halfback	John Carroll
19	3	219	Gene Prebola	Tight end	Boston University
20	3	231	Dean Look	Quarterback	Michigan State

== 1961 draft ==
Detroit Lions' selections in the 1961 NFL draftSource: Pro Football Reference
Round	Pick #	Overall	Name	Position	College
2	9	23	Dan LaRose	Tackle	Missouri
3	6	34	Dick Mills	Guard	Pittsburgh
3	10	38	Houston Antwine	Defensive tackle	Southern Illinois
4	9	51	Ron Hartline	Fullback	Oklahoma
5	10	66	Earl Faison	Defensive end	Indiana
5	14	70	Ron Puckett	Tackle	Los Angeles State
8	9	107	Larry Muff	End	Benedictine
9	10	122	Bob Brooks	Fullback	Ohio
10	9	135	Errol Linden	Tackle	Houston
11	10	150	Larry Vargo	Defensive back	Detroit Mercy
12	9	163	Tom Rodgers	Back	Kentucky
13	10	178	Paul Hodge	Linebacker	Pittsburgh
14	9	191	Charley Bowers	Halfback	Arizona State
15	10	206	Mike Lauber	End	Wisconsin–River Falls
16	9	219	Gus Krantz	Tackle	Northern Michigan
17	10	234	Tom Goode	Center	Mississippi State
18	9	247	John Gregor	Tackle	Montana
19	10	262	Gene Valesano	Back	Northern Michigan
20	9	275	Tom Lewis	Back	Lake Forest

== 1962 draft ==
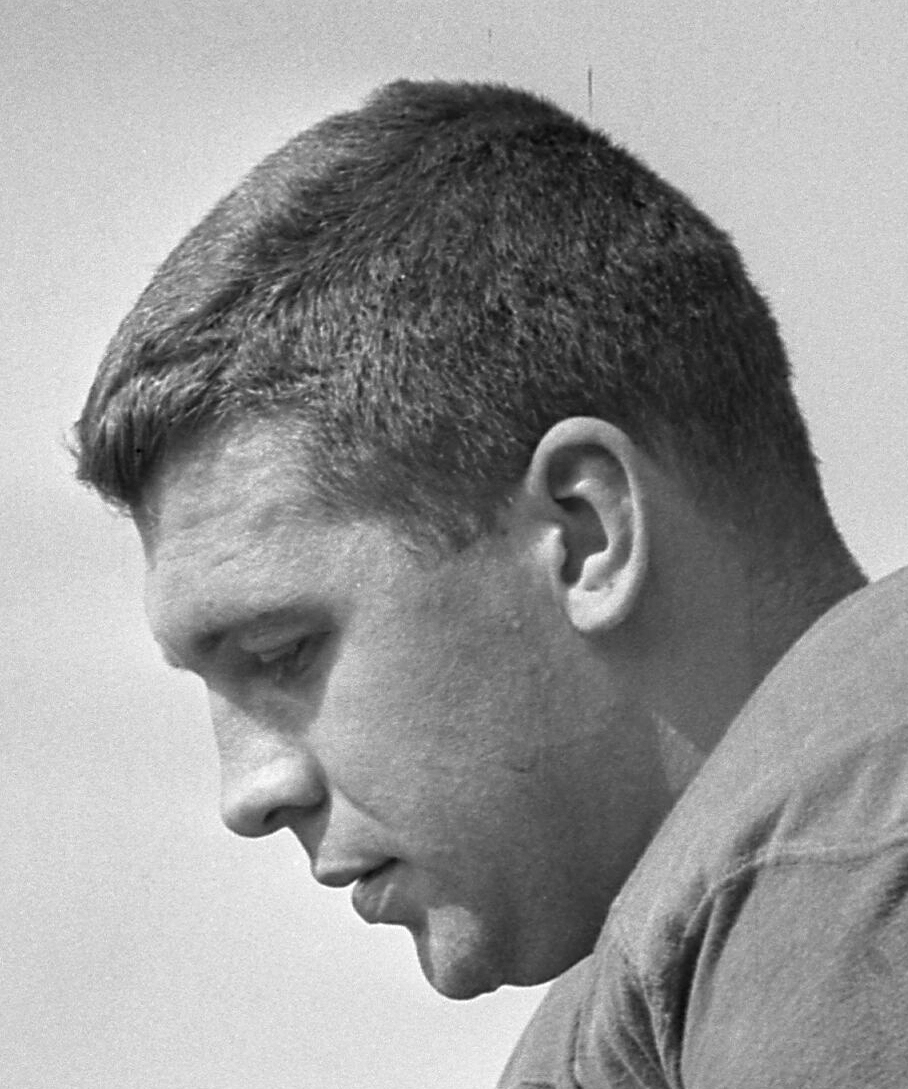
Mike Bundra was the Lions' sixth-round selection in the 1962 draft.

Detroit Lions' selections in the 1962 NFL draftSource: Pro Football Reference
Round	Pick #	Overall	Name	Position	College
1	10	10	John Hadl	Quarterback	Kansas
2	10	24	Eddie Wilson	Quarterback	Arizona
3	10	38	Bobby Thompson	Defensive back	Arizona
4	6	48	John Lomakoski	Tackle	Western Michigan
4	10	52	Larry Ferguson	Halfback	Iowa
5	10	66	Dan Birdwell	Defensive tackle	Houston
6	10	80	Mike Bundra	Defensive tackle	USC
7	10	94	Tom Hall	Wide receiver	Minnesota
8	10	108	Murdock Hooper	Tackle	Houston
8	11	109	Frank Imperiale	Guard	Southern Illinois
9	10	122	Todd Grant	Center	Michigan
10	10	136	Jerry Archer	Center	Pittsburg State
11	10	150	Karl Anderson	Tackle	Bowling Green
12	10	164	Gale Sprute	Center	Winona State
13	10	178	Sherlock Knight	Tackle	Central State (OH)
14	10	192	Jim Davidson	Back	Maryland
15	10	206	Dick Broadbent	End	Delaware
16	10	220	Tom Sestak	Defensive tackle	McNeese State
17	10	234	Rucker Wickline	Center	Marshall
18	10	248	Joe Zuger	Quarterback	Arizona State
19	10	262	Jim Bernhardt	Tackle	Linfield
20	10	276	Bob Brown	End	Michigan

== 1963 draft ==
Detroit Lions' selections in the 1963 NFL draftSource: Pro Football Reference
Round	Pick #	Overall	Name	Position	College
1	12	12	Daryl Sanders	Tackle	Ohio State
2	13	27	Roy Williams	Defensive tackle	Pacific
4	13	55	Chuck Walton	Guard	Iowa State
6	13	83	Don King	Halfback	Syracuse
7	12	96	John Gamble	Guard	Pacific
8	13	111	Dennis Gaubatz	Linebacker	LSU
9	12	124	Ken Dill	Linebacker	Mississippi
10	13	139	Nick Ryder	Fullback	Miami (FL)
11	12	152	Karl Kassulke	Defensive back	Drake
12	13	167	Tom Janik	Defensive back	Texas A&M–Kingsville
13	12	180	Ernie Clark	Linebacker	Michigan State
14	13	195	Bill O'Brien	Tackle	Xavier
15	12	208	Jim Simon	Guard	Miami (FL)
16	13	223	Charlie Johnson	Tackle	Villanova
17	12	236	Gene Frantz	Back	BYU
18	13	251	Al Greer	End	Jackson State
19	12	264	Lucien Reeberg	Tackle	Hampton
20	13	279	Gordon Scarborough	Back	Texas A&M–Commerce

== 1964 draft ==
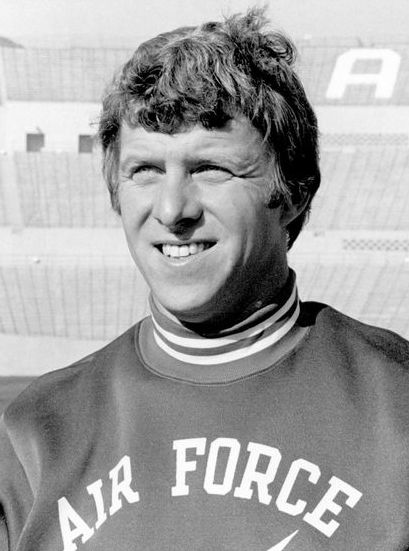
Hall of Fame coach Bill Parcells, pictured here in 1978, was the Lions' seventh-round selection in the 1964 draft.

Detroit Lions' selections in the 1964 NFL draftSource: Pro Football Reference
Round	Pick #	Overall	Name	Position	College
1	5	5	Pete Beathard	Quarterback	USC
2	6	20	Matt Snorton	Tight end	Michigan State
3	2	30	Pat Batten	Fullback	Hardin–Simmons
3	5	33	Gerry Philbin	Defensive end	Buffalo
4	6	48	Wally Hilgenberg	Linebacker	Iowa
5	5	61	Benny Nelson	Defensive back	Alabama
6	6	76	John Hilton	Tight end	Richmond
7	5	89	Bill Parcells	Tackle	Wichita State
9	5	117	Wayne Rasmussen	Defensive back	South Dakota State
10	6	132	Larry Hand	Defensive end	Appalachian State
10	8	134	Glenn Holton	Halfback	West Virginia
11	5	145	Don Hyne	Tackle	Baldwin Wallace
12	6	160	Warren Wells	Split end	Texas Southern
13	5	173	John Miller	Tackle	Idaho State
14	6	188	Doug Bickle	End	Hillsdale
15	5	201	Roger LaLonde	Defensive tackle	Muskingum
16	6	216	Allan Robinson	Halfback	BYU
17	5	229	Joe Provenzano	Tackle	Kansas State
18	6	244	Willis Langley	Tackle	LSU
19	5	257	Bruce Zellmer	Halfback	Winona State
20	6	272	Steve Barilla	Tackle	Wichita State

== 1965 draft ==
Detroit Lions' selections in the 1965 NFL draftSource: Pro Football Reference
Round	Pick #	Overall	Name	Position	College
1	11	11	Tom Nowatzke	Fullback	Indiana
2	11	25	Jerry Rush	Defensive tackle	Michigan State
3	11	39	Fred Biletnikoff †	Wide receiver	Florida State
4	4	46	Tom Myers	Quarterback	Northwestern
5	1	57	Tom Vaughn	Defensive back	Iowa State
5	8	64	Ed Flanagan	Center	Purdue
5	11	67	John Flynn	End	Oklahoma
6	11	81	Earl Hawkins	Back	Emory and Henry
7	8	92	Greg Kent	Tackle	Utah
7	11	95	Bob Kowalkowski	Guard	Virginia
8	11	109	Larry Harbin	Back	Appalachian State
9	11	123	Bruce McLenna	Halfback	Hillsdale
10	11	137	Frank Pennie	Tackle	Florida
11	11	151	Jim Kearney	Defensive back	Prairie View A&M
12	11	165	Jim Moore	Linebacker	North Texas
13	11	179	Jack Jacobson	Defensive back	Oklahoma State
14	11	193	Larry Brown	Back	Oklahoma
15	11	207	Wallace Dickey	Tackle	Texas State
16	11	221	John Smith	Tackle	Maryland Eastern Shore
17	11	235	Sonny Odom	Halfback	Duke
18	11	249	Karl Sweetan	Quarterback	Wake Forest
19	11	263	Preston Love	Back	Nebraska
20	11	277	George Wilson	Quarterback	Notre Dame

== 1966 draft ==
Detroit Lions' selections in the 1966 NFL draftSource: Pro Football Reference
Round	Pick #	Overall	Name	Position	College
2	8	24	Nick Eddy	Running back	Notre Dame
3	7	39	Bill Malinchak	Split end	Indiana
4	7	55	Doug Van Horn	Guard	Ohio State
4	11	59	Willie Walker	Wide receiver	Tennessee State
5	3	67	Bill Cody	Linebacker	Auburn
6	7	87	Wayne DeSutter	Tackle	Western Illinois
7	8	103	Johnnie Robinson	Defensive back	Tennessee State
8	7	117	John Pincavage	Halfback	Virginia
9	11	136	Dick Cunningham	Tackle	Arkansas
10	8	148	Bruce Yates	Tackle	Auburn
10	10	150	Tom Brigham	Defensive end	Wisconsin
11	9	164	Jack O'Billovich	Linebacker	Oregon State
12	8	178	Randy Winkler	Tackle	Tarleton State
13	7	192	Bill Maselter	Tackle	Wisconsin
14	11	211	Denis Moore	Defensive tackle	USC
15	10	225	Bill Sullivan	Defensive end	West Virginia
16	9	239	Jerry Gendron	End	Wisconsin–Eau Claire
17	8	253	Ralph Dunlap	Defensive end	Baylor
18	7	267	Bill Johnson	End	West Alabama
19	11	286	Bob Baier	Tackle	Simpson
20	10	300	Allen Smith	Halfback	Findlay

== 1967 draft ==
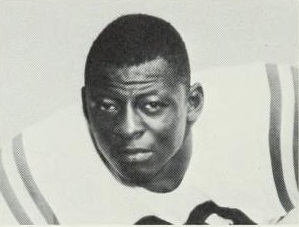
Mel Farr was the Lions' first-round selection in the 1967 draft.

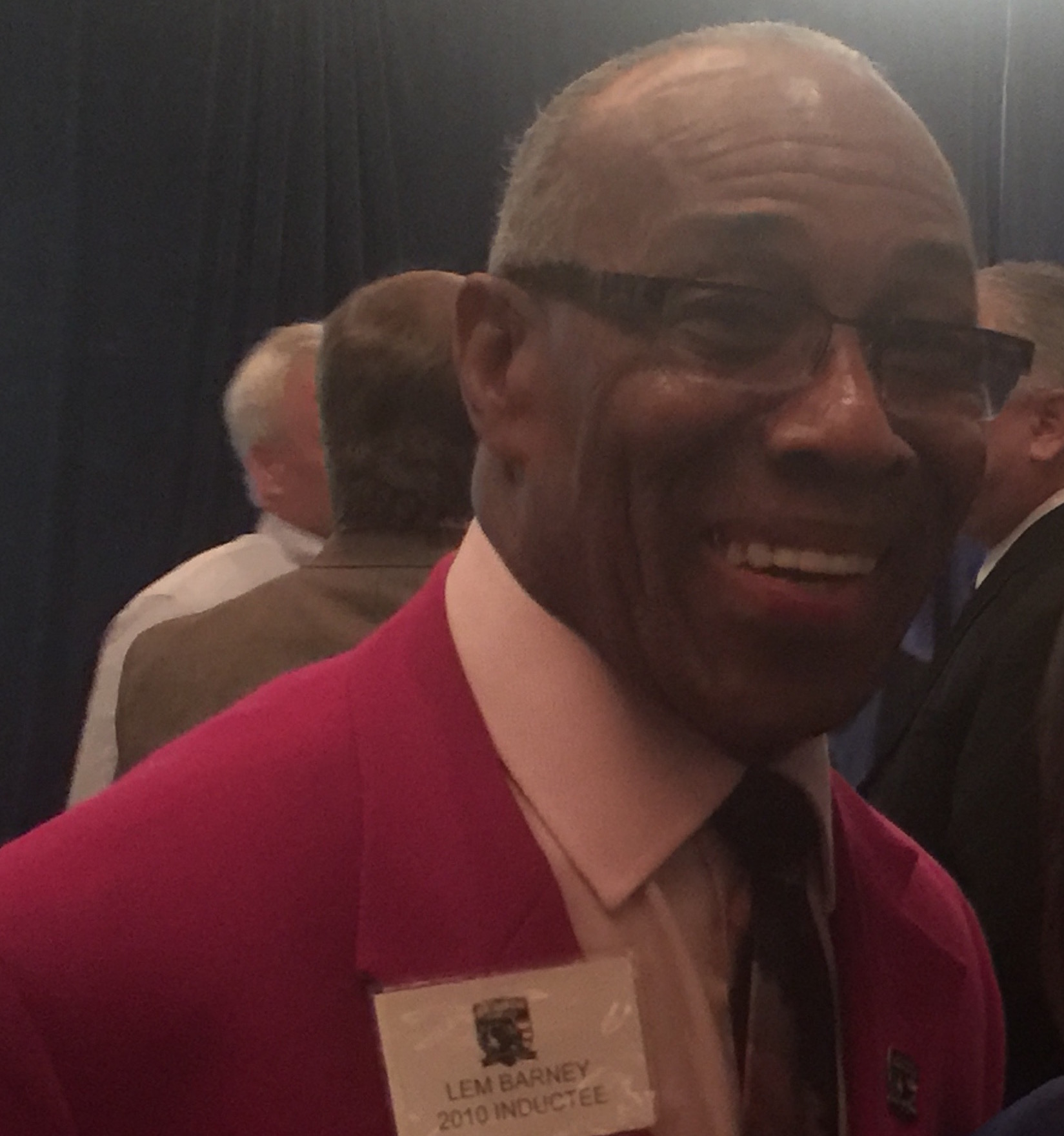
Hall of Fame cornerback Lem Barney, pictured here in 2015, was the Lions' second-round selection in the 1967 draft.

Detroit Lions' selections in the 1967 NFL draftSource: Pro Football Reference
Round	Pick #	Overall	Name	Position	College
1	7	7	Mel Farr	Running back	UCLA
2	8	34	Lem Barney †	Defensive back	Jackson State
3	7	60	Paul Naumoff	Linebacker	Tennessee
4	8	88	Lew Kamanu	Defensive end	Weber State
6	8	141	Tim Jones	Quarterback	Weber State
6	11	144	John McCambridge	Defensive end	Northwestern
7	7	166	Ted Tuinstra	Tackle	Iowa State
9	7	218	Mike Weger	Defensive back	Bowling Green
10	8	245	Jerry Hayhoe	Guard	USC
11	7	270	Ray Shirey	Tackle	Arizona State
12	7	297	Eric Watts	Defensive back	San Jose State
13	7	322	Lamar Wright	Guard	Georgia Tech
14	8	349	Cleveland Robinson	Defensive end	South Carolina State
15	7	374	Sam Burke	Defensive back	Georgia Tech
16	8	401	Jerry Zawadzkas	Tight end	Columbia
17	7	426	Ken Ramsey	Defensive tackle	Northwestern

== 1968 draft ==
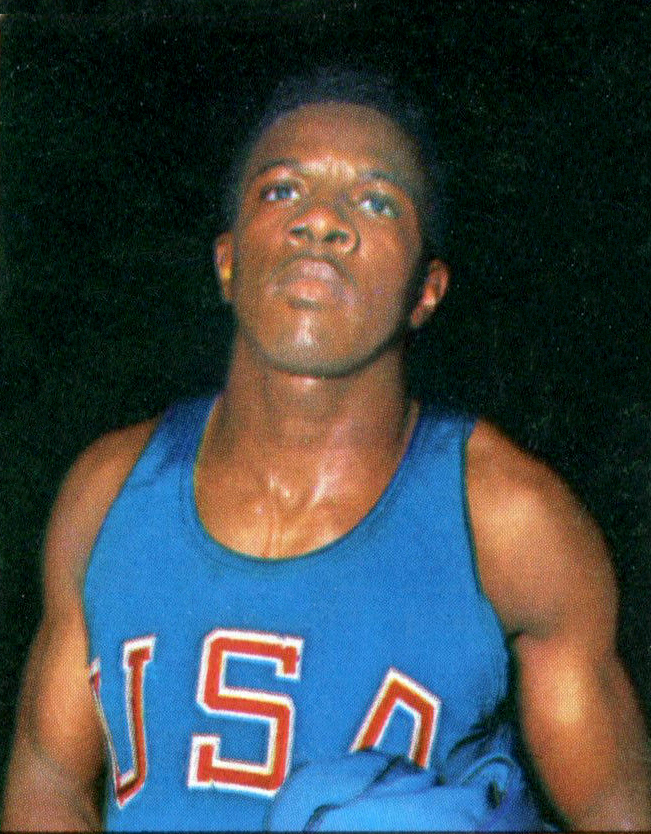
Earl McCullouch was one of the Lions' first-round selections in the 1968 draft.

Detroit Lions' selections in the 1968 NFL draftSource: Pro Football Reference
Round	Pick #	Overall	Name	Position	College
1	11	11	Greg Landry	Quarterback	Massachusetts
1	24	24	Earl McCullouch	Wide receiver	USC
2	10	37	Jerry DePoyster	Kicker	Wyoming
3	19	74	Charlie Sanders †	Tight end	Minnesota
4	10	93	Ed Mooney	Linebacker	Texas Tech
5	9	120	Phil Odle	Wide receiver	BYU
6	10	148	Mike Spitzer	Defensive end	San Jose State
8	10	202	Terry Miller	Linebacker	Illinois
9	10	229	Greg Barton	Quarterback	Tulsa
10	10	256	Granville Liggins	Linebacker	Oklahoma
11	10	283	Dwight Little	Guard	Kentucky
12	10	310	Ed Caruthers	Defensive back	Arizona
13	10	337	Chuck Bailey	Tackle	Humboldt State
14	10	364	Richie Davis	End	Upsala
15	10	391	Jim Oliver	Running back	Colorado State
16	10	418	Bob Rokita	Defensive end	Arizona State

== 1969 draft ==
Detroit Lions' selections in the 1969 NFL draftSource: Pro Football Reference
Round	Pick #	Overall	Name	Position	College
2	8	34	Altie Taylor	Running back	Utah State
2	21	47	Jim Yarbrough	Tackle	Florida
3	7	59	Larry Walton	Wide receiver	Arizona State
8	8	190	Jim Carr	Tackle	Jackson State
9	8	216	Rocky Rasley	Guard	Oregon State
10	8	242	Bob Bergum	Defensive end	Wisconsin–Platteville
11	8	268	Ron Walker	Defensive end	Morris Brown
12	8	294	Bob Hadlock	Defensive tackle	George Fox
13	3	320	Wilson Bowie	Running back	USC
14	8	346	George Hoey	Defensive back	Michigan
15	8	372	Fred Gough	Linebacker	Texas–Arlington
16	8	398	Ken Spain	Defensive end	Houston
16	17	407	John Stahl	Guard	Fresno State
17	8	424	Gary Steele	Tight end	Army
