= Speth =

Speth is a surname. Notable people with the surname include:

- George Speth, American football player
- Hans Speth, military commander
- James Gustave Speth, American environmental lawyer and activist
- Johann Speth, German composer
- Ralf Speth, automotive executive

== Other ==
- 28800 Speth, minor planet
