= 1942 Chicago Cardinals season =

American football team season

- Head coach: Jimmy Conzelman
- Home stadium: Comiskey Park

Results
- Record: 3–8
- Division place: 4th NFL Western
- Playoffs: Did not qualify

The 1942 Chicago Cardinals season was the 23rd season the team was in the league. The team failed to improve on their previous output of 3–7–1, losing eight games. They failed to qualify for the playoffs for the 17th consecutive season.

== Schedule ==
The Cards opened their 1942 regular season schedule playing the Cleveland Rams at Civic Stadium in Buffalo, New York. This was a regularly scheduled event. The team also played two regularly scheduled home games at night — September 20 against the Detroit Lions and October 4 against the Green Bay Packers.

The team also played an exhibition game during a bye week against the Wichita Aero Commandos, a team associated with a military materiel factory. The game was a mismatch won by the visiting professionals 35–7 in front of a crowd estimated at 4,000 — said to be the biggest of the year for the venue. During this game the Cardinals injured and ended the season of the star quarterback of the Aero Commandos, Ralph Miller — a three sport athlete drafted by the Brooklyn Dodgers in the 1942 NFL draft who later became a Hall of Fame basketball coach.

Game	Date	Opponent	Result	Record	Venue	Attendance	Recap	Sources
1	September 13	vs. **Cleveland Rams**	**W** 7–0	1–0	Buffalo Civic Stadium	18,698	Recap	
2	September 20	**Detroit Lions**	**W** 13–0	2–0	Comiskey Park	14,742	Recap	
3	October 4	**Green Bay Packers**	**L** 13–17	2–1	Comiskey Park	24,897	Recap	
4	October 11	at **Chicago Bears**	**L** 14–41	2–2	Wrigley Field	38,500	Recap	
5	October 18	at **Detroit Lions**	**W** 7–0	3–2	Briggs Stadium	14,100	Recap	
6	October 25	at **Cleveland Rams**	**L** 3–7	3–3	League Park	7,896	Recap	
7	November 1	at **Green Bay Packers**	**L** 24–55	3–4	City Stadium	14,782	Recap	
8	November 8	at Washington Redskins	**L** 0–28	3–5	Griffith Stadium	35,425	Recap	
—	November 15	at Wichita Aero Commandos	**W** 35–7	—	Lawrence Stadium	4,000		
9	November 22	at Pittsburgh Steelers	**L** 3–19	3–6	Forbes Field	20,711	Recap	
10	November 29	at New York Giants	**L** 7–21	3–7	Polo Grounds	20,354	Recap	
11	December 6	**Chicago Bears**	**L** 7–21	3–8	Comiskey Park	8,251	Recap	
Note: Intra-division opponents are in **bold** text. • September 20, October 4: Saturday night games

== Standings ==
NFL Western Division
	W	L	T	PCT	DIV	PF	PA	STK
Chicago Bears	11	0	0	1.000	8–0	376	84	W11
Green Bay Packers	8	2	1	.800	6–2	300	215	W2
Cleveland Rams	5	6	0	.455	3–5	150	207	L1
Chicago Cardinals	3	8	0	.273	3–5	98	209	L6
Detroit Lions	0	11	0	.000	0–8	38	263	L11

Note: Tie games were not officially counted in the standings until 1972.
