= Hank Goodman =

American football player (1919–2007)

Profile
- Position: Tackle

Personal information
- Born: March 18, 1919; Bradford, Pennsylvania, U.S.
- Died: March 25, 2007 (aged 88); Bradford, Pennsylvania, U.S.
- Listed height: 6 ft 4 in (1.93 m)
- Listed weight: 230 lb (104 kg)

Career information
- High school: Bradford (PA)
- College: St. Bonaventure, George Washington, West Virginia

Career history
- Detroit Lions (1942)

Career statistics
- Games: 11
- Stats at Pro Football Reference

Henry Joseph Goodman (March 18, 1919 – March 25, 2007) was an American football player.

A native of Bradford, Pennsylvania, Goodman attended Bradford High School and then played college football at St. Bonaventure, George Washington, and West Virginia.

He played professional football in the National Football League (NFL) as a tackle for the Detroit Lions. He appeared in 11 NFL games during the 1942 season.
