= Tony Furst =

American football player (1918–2009)

Profile
- Position: Tackle

Personal information
- Born: April 26, 1918; Dayton, Ohio, US
- Died: September 5, 2009 (aged 91)
- Listed height: 6 ft 1 in (1.85 m)
- Listed weight: 217 lb (98 kg)

Career information
- High school: Chaminade (OH)
- College: Dayton

Career history
- Detroit Lions (1940–1941, 1944)

Career statistics
- Games: 21
- Games started: 10
- Interceptions: 1
- Stats at Pro Football Reference

Anthony Raymond Furst (April 26, 1918 – September 5, 2009) was an American football player. He played college football at the University of Dayton and professional football for the Detroit Lions during the 1940, 1941, and 1944 seasons. He also served in the military during World War II and saw combat action during the Guadalcanal campaign.

== Early life ==
Furst was born in Dayton, Ohio, in 1918 and attended Dayton's Chaminade High School. He played college football for the University of Dayton and was part of the Dayton squad that snapped Western Reserve's 27-game winning streak. After his senior season, he was selected to play in the Chicago College All-Star Game.

== Professional football and military service ==
Furst arrives a second too late to stop Eagles quarterback Davey O'Brien from completing a 10-yard pass, 1940.

After graduating from Dayton, he played professional football in the National Football League (NFL) as a tackle for the Detroit Lions. He appeared in 19 NFL games, 10 as a starter, during the 1940 and 1941 seasons. During the 1940 season, he played the full 60 minutes in six games. At 215 pounds, he was one of the lightest tackles in the NFL.

Furst had served in the Reserve Officers' Training Corps at the University of Dayton and was a military reservist. After the attack on Pearl Harbor, he was called to active duty and attained the rank of first lieutenant. He saw combat action in the Guadalcanal campaign, underwent surgery on his veins in New Zealand, and returned to Dayton at the end of 1943.

Furst returned to the Lions in 1944, but appeared in only two games, neither as a starter.

== Later life ==
After retiring from football, he operated a flower shop (Furst Florist) in North Dayton that had been established by his family in 1905. He ran unsuccessfully for Montgomery County Sheriff in 1960 and for the state legislature in 1964. He was inducted into the University of Dayton Hall of Fame in 1965. He died in 2009 at age 91. He was buried at Calvary Cemetery in Dayton.
