= Harry Seltzer =

American football player (1919–1990)

- Harry Seltzer, 1942

Profile
- Position: Fullback

Personal information
- Born: March 26, 1919; Philadelphia
- Died: July 13, 1990 (aged 71); Camden, New Jersey
- Listed height: 5 ft 9 in (1.75 m)
- Listed weight: 195 lb (88 kg)

Career information
- College: Morris Harvey

Career history
- Detroit Lions (1942)

Career statistics
- Games: 6
- Stats at Pro Football Reference

Harry Seltzer (March 26, 1919 – July 13, 1990) was an American football player.

A native of Philadelphia, Seltzer played college football at West Philadelphia High School, Brown Prep, and Morris Harvey.

He played professional football in the National Football League (NFL) as a fullback for the Detroit Lions. He appeared in six NFL games, one as a starter, during the 1942 season.

He died in 1990 at Our Lady of Lourdes Medical Center in Camden, New Jersey, at age 71.
