= Mike Bundra =

American football player (1939–2009)

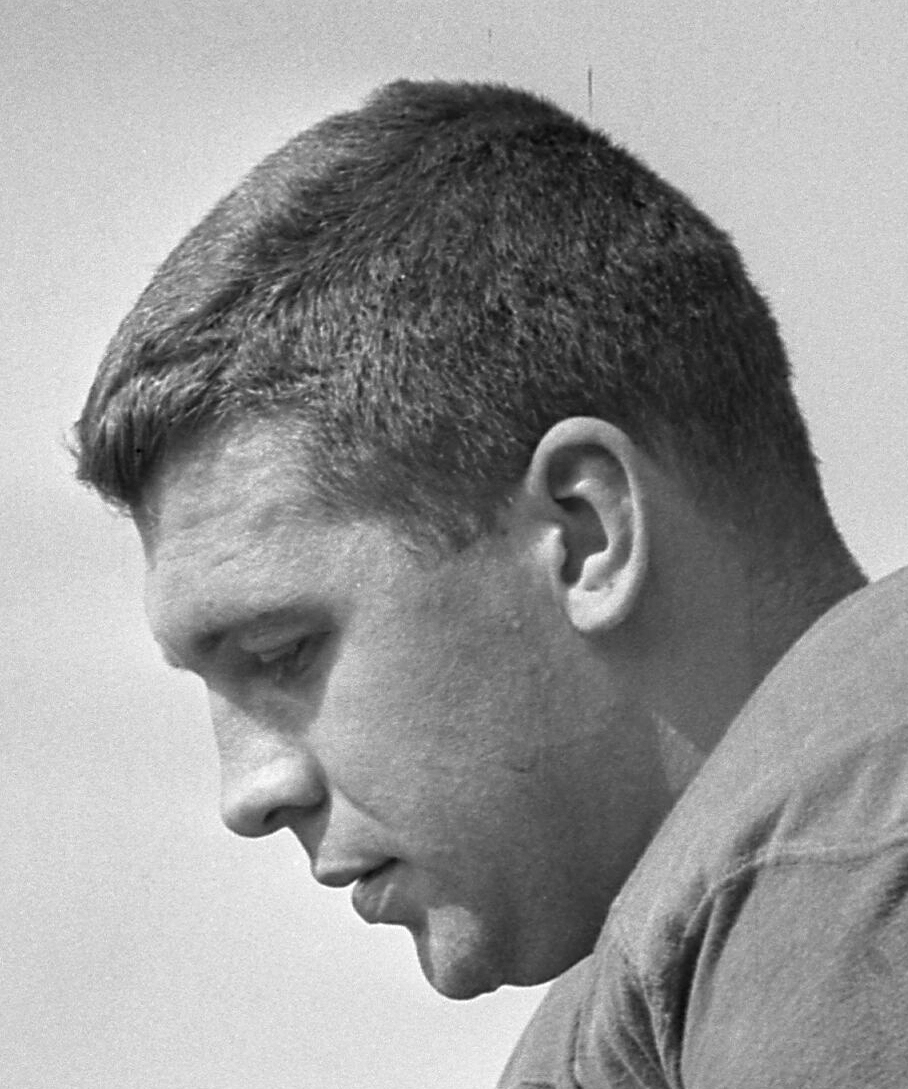
- Bundra as a USC player

No. 74, 75, 72
- Position: Defensive tackle

Personal information
- Born: June 24, 1939; Coplay, Pennsylvania, U.S.
- Died: August 1, 2009 (aged 70); Maryville, Tennessee, U.S.
- Listed height: 6 ft 3 in (1.91 m)
- Listed weight: 255 lb (116 kg)

Career information
- High school: Catasauqua
- College: USC
- NFL draft: 1962: 6th round, 80th overall pick

Career history
- Detroit Lions (1962–1963); Minnesota Vikings (1964); Cleveland Browns (1964); New York Giants (1965); Baltimore Colts (1966)*; Hartford Charter Oaks (1966)
- * Offseason or practice squad member only

Awards and highlights
- NFL champion (1964)

Career NFL statistics
- Fumble recoveries: 4
- Sacks: 2
- Stats at Pro Football Reference

Michael Paul Bundra (June 24, 1939 - August 1, 2009) was an American professional football player, selected by the Detroit Lions in 1962. He played with the Lions for two seasons before playing for both the Minnesota Vikings (4 games) and the Cleveland Browns (9 games) in the 1964 season, which earned him an NFL championship ring when the Browns beat the Baltimore Colts 27–0.

He played for the New York Giants the next season, playing 9 games before retiring. In 48 total career games, he recovered 4 fumbles.

On August 1, 2009, Bundra died at age 70 in Maryville, Tennessee.
