= John Polanski =

American football player (1918–1956)

- Polanski, 1944

No. 32, 73, 78
- Position: Fullback

Personal information
- Born: September 6, 1918; Buffalo, New York, U.S.
- Died: March 11, 1956 (aged 37); Ann Arbor, Michigan, U.S.
- Listed height: 6 ft 2 in (1.88 m)
- Listed weight: 211 lb (96 kg)

Career information
- College: Cornell (1937); Wake Forest (1938-1941); Fort Pierce Amphibs (1944)
- NFL draft: 1942: 11th round, 95th overall pick

Career history
- Detroit Lions (1942); Los Angeles Dons (1946)

Awards and highlights
- NCAA rushing yards leader (1939)

Career NFL/AAFC statistics
- Rushing yards: 144
- Rushing average: 3.2
- Receptions: 2
- Receiving yards: 15
- Total touchdowns: 2
- Stats at Pro Football Reference

John Bill Polanski (September 6, 1918 – March 11, 1956) was an American football fullback. He played college football for Wake Forest and led the NCAA in rushing in 1939. He also played professional football for the Detroit Lions in 1942 and Los Angeles Dons in 1946.

== Early life ==
Polanski was born in 1918 in Buffalo, New York. He attended Riverside High School in Buffalo. As a triple threat fullback at Riverside, he was selected by the Buffalo Courier Express as the outstanding and most versatile player of the year for 1936.

== College football ==
Polanski initially enrolled at Cornell University where he played freshman football in 1937. He then transferred to Wake Forest University and played college football for the Wake Forest Demon Deacons football team from 1939 to 1941. He led all players in the NCAA major colleges with 882 rushing yards during the 1939 season. He also led the Southern Conference in scoring with 91 points in 1939. He also scored 96 points for Wake Forest in 1941.

Polanski also played for the Wake Forest baseball and basketball teams.

== Professional football and military service ==
In August 1942, Polanski signed with the Detroit Lions. He appeared in three games for the Lions in 1942, but his professional football career was cut short when he was ordered in early October 1942 to report to the Naval Training School at South Bend, Indiana. Polanski played football in 1944 as the fullback for the undefeated 1944 Fort Pierce Amphibs football team. While in the Navy, he was promoted from ensign to lieutenant. After being released from the military, Polanski played for the Los Angeles Dons in 1946.

== Later life ==
Polanski lived in his later years in Redford Township, Michigan, working for a drug manufacturer. He married and had four children. He died of a blood disease in 1956 at age 37 at the University of Michigan Hospital.

== See also ==
- List of college football yearly rushing leaders
