= Emil Banjavic =

American football player (1915–1995)

- Emil Banjavic, 1942

No. 11
- Position: Back

Personal information
- Born: September 19, 1915; Staunton, Illinois, U.S.
- Died: December 1, 1995 (aged 80); Las Vegas, Nevada, U.S.
- Listed height: 6 ft 1 in (1.85 m)
- Listed weight: 194 lb (88 kg)

Career information
- High school: Staunton
- College: Arizona (1938-1941)
- NFL draft: 1942: 9th round, 75th overall pick

Career history
- Detroit Lions (1942)

Career NFL statistics
- Rushing yards: 67
- Rushing average: 6.1
- Receptions: 5
- Receiving yards: 50
- Total touchdowns: 1
- Stats at Pro Football Reference

Emil Thomas Banjavic (September 19, 1915 – December 1, 1995) was an American professional football player.

A native of Staunton, Illinois, Banjavic attended Staunton High School and then played college football at the University of Arizona from 1938 to 1941. He was a triple-threat player who was a good kicker, runner, and passer. He was also captain of the Arizona Wildcats football team. In a feature story on the first 56 years of Arizona football, Banjavic was called "the hard-driving star" of Arizona's 1939-1941 teams.

He was selected in the ninth round by the Detroit Lions with the 75th overall pick of the 1942 NFL draft. He was described as having "the ideal build for a wingback." He appeared in 10 NFL games as a back for the Lions during the 1942 season, rushing for 67 yards on 11 carries.

He later worked for an aircraft plant in Arizona and the Railroad Retirement Board in Texas. He died in Las Vegas, Nevada, in 1995 at age 80.
