= Ted Pavelec =

American football player (1918–2005)

- Ted Pavelec, 1940

No. 71, 17, 27, 11
- Positions: Guard, tackle

Personal information
- Born: November 4, 1918; Kalamazoo, Michigan, U.S.
- Died: April 15, 2005 (aged 86)
- Listed height: 6 ft 0 in (1.83 m)
- Listed weight: 218 lb (99 kg)

Career information
- High school: St. Augustine (MI)
- College: Detroit
- NFL draft: 1941: 10th round, 85th overall pick

Career history
- Detroit Lions (1941–1943); Los Angeles Bulldogs (1943, 1945-1946)

Career NFL statistics
- Games played: 25
- Games started: 14
- Field goals made: 1
- Stats at Pro Football Reference

Theodore Charles Pavelec (November 4, 1918 – April 15, 2005) was an American professional football player.

A native of Kalamazoo, Michigan, Pavelec attended St. Augustine High School in Kalamazoo where he won varsity letters in football, basketball, baseball, and golf. He then attended the University of Detroit and played college football as a tackle and place-kicker for Gus Dorais' Detroit Titans football teams from 1938 to 1940. He was rated as one of the best linemen in University of Detroit history. In November 1940, he kicked a 43-yard field goal to give the Titans a 3–0 victory over TCU. He also competed in Catholic Youth Organization boxing while attending the University of Detroit.

He was selected by the Detroit Lions in the tenth round with the 85th pick in the 1941 NFL draft, signed with the club in May 1941, and won a starting role with the club in September 1941. He played for the Lions during the 1941, 1942, and 1943 seasons, appearing in 25 NFL games, 14 as a starter.

In 1944, Pavelec played as a guard and place-kicker for the Hollywood Rangers of the American Football League (AFL), winning all-pro honors and kicked 67 out of 69 extra points and five field goals, including a 51-yarder. While playing for Hollywood, he also signed to play the role of a boxer in the feature film "The Great John L.".

Pavelec died in 2005.
