= Perry Scott =

American football player and coach (1917–1988)

- Scott, c. 1952

No. 82, 83
- Position: End

Personal information
- Born: August 27, 1917; East Orange, New Jersey, U.S.
- Died: April 4, 1988 (aged 70); Allentown, Pennsylvania, U.S.
- Listed height: 6 ft 2 in (1.88 m)
- Listed weight: 210 lb (95 kg)

Career information
- High school: Bernards (NJ)
- College: Muhlenberg
- NFL draft: 1941: 15th round, 135th overall pick

Career history
- Detroit Lions (1942); Bethlehem Bulldogs (1947–1949)

Career NFL statistics
- Receptions: 1
- Receiving yards: 7
- Stats at Pro Football Reference

Leonard Perry Scott Jr. (August 27, 1917 – April 4, 1988) was an American professional football player and coach. He played college football for Muhlenberg from 1937 to 1940 and professional football for the Detroit Lions in 1942 and the Bethlehem Bulldogs from 1947 to 1949. After his playing career ended, he coached high school football in Allentown, Pennsylvania.

== Early life ==
Scott was born in 1917 at East Orange, New Jersey. Raised in the Basking Ridge section of Bernards Township, New Jersey, he attended Bernards High School in Bernardsville, and played college football at Muhlenberg College from 1937 to 1940.

== Professional football and military service ==
Scott was selected by the Detroit Lions in the 15th round with the 135th pick of the 1941 NFL draft. He appeared in seven NFL games as an end and tackle for the Lions during the 1942 season.

Scott served in the Army Air Corps during World War II. During the war, he flew B-24 Liberator bombers. He flew 31 combat missions in Europe and attained the rank of major. After the war, he played professional football in the American Football League as an end for the Bethlehem Bulldogs from 1947 to 1949.

== Later life ==
Scott married Emma V. Marsden in 1951. He worked as a history teach and football coach at William Allen High School in Allentown, Pennsylvania, from 1948 until his retirement. He died in 1988 at Lehigh Valley Hospital in Allentown.
