= Alex Schibanoff =

American football player and track athlete (1919–1995)

No. 79, 78
- Positions: Offensive tackle, defensive tackle

Personal information
- Born: October 17, 1919; Freehold Township, New Jersey, U.S.
- Died: November 27, 1995 (aged 76); New Milford, Connecticut, U.S.
- Listed height: 6 ft 1 in (1.85 m)
- Listed weight: 218 lb (99 kg)

Career information
- High school: Freehold
- College: Franklin & Marshall
- NFL draft: 1941: 14th round, 125th overall pick

Career history
- Detroit Lions (1941–1942)

Awards and highlights
- First-team Little All-American (1940)

Career NFL statistics
- Games played: 8
- Games started: 6
- Stats at Pro Football Reference

Alex Schibanoff (October 17, 1919 – November 27, 1995) was an American professional football tackle and track-and-field athlete. He played professionally in 1941 and 1942 for the Detroit Lions of the National Football League (NFL).

== Biography ==
A native of Freehold Township, New Jersey, Schibanoff attended Freehold High School, where he played football and wrestled.

He attended Franklin & Marshall College, where he played football and ran track. There he set a Middle Atlantic records in the shot put and discus.

Schibanoff also played professional football in the National Football League (NFL) as a tackle for the Detroit Lions. He appeared in two games during the 1941 season and six games during the 1942 season.

In April 1942, following the attack on Pearl Harbor, Schibanoff enlisted in the U.S. Naval Reserve. After the 1942 season, he was called to active duty in the Navy, serving as executive officer on a PT boat in the South Pacific.

Schibanoff later worked for Blue Cross/Blue Shield in Manhattan for more than 30 years. He died November 27, 1995, in New Milford, Connecticut.
