= Tony Arena =

American football player (1918–1996)

No. 52
- Positions: Center, linebacker

Personal information
- Born: July 2, 1918; Detroit, Michigan, U.S.
- Died: August 18, 1996 (aged 78); Mattoon, Illinois, U.S.
- Listed height: 6 ft 0 in (1.83 m)
- Listed weight: 200 lb (91 kg)

Career information
- High school: Northwestern (Detroit)
- College: Michigan State (1938–1941)
- NFL draft: 1942: 13th round, 115th overall pick

Career history
- Detroit Lions (1942)

Career NFL statistics
- Games played: 1
- Stats at Pro Football Reference

Anthony Gerald Arena (July 2, 1918 – August 18, 1996) was an American professional football player. He played college football for the Michigan State College (later known as Michigan State University). He won the Governor of Michigan award as the most valuable player on the 1941 Michigan State Spartans football team. He also played professional football in the National Football League for the Detroit Lions in 1942.
