= Joe Stringfellow =

American football and baseball player (1918–1992)

No. 81
- Position: Tailback

Personal information
- Born: March 10, 1918; Meridian, Mississippi, U.S.
- Died: September 16, 1992 (aged 74); Savannah, Georgia, U.S.
- Listed height: 6 ft 0 in (1.83 m)
- Listed weight: 185 lb (84 kg)

Career information
- College: Mississippi Southern
- NFL draft: 1942: 12th round, 105th overall pick

Career history
- Detroit Lions (1942)

Career NFL statistics
- Rushing yards: 41
- Rushing average: 2.6
- Receptions: 8
- Receiving yards: 89
- Stats at Pro Football Reference

Joseph Elbert Stringfellow (March 10, 1918 – September 16, 1992) was an American professional football tailback who played one season with the Detroit Lions of the National Football League (NFL). He was selected by the Lions in the twelfth round of the 1942 NFL draft after playing college football at Mississippi Southern College. He also played minor league baseball.

== Early life ==
Joseph Elbert Stringfellow was born on March 10, 1918, in Meridian, Mississippi. He was a member of the Mississippi Southern Southerners of Mississippi Southern College from 1938 to 1941 and a three-year letterman from 1939 to 1941. He was inducted into the M-Club Alumni Association Hall of Fame on May 8, 1971.

== Professional football career ==
Stringfellow was selected by the Detroit Lions in the 12th round, with the 105th overall pick, of the 1942 NFL draft. He played in nine games, starting two, for the Lions during the 1942 season, totaling 16 rushes for 41 yards, eight receptions for 89 yards, five completions on 13 passing attempts for 67 yards and two interceptions, nine punts for 363 yards, and two kick returns for 54 yards.

== Professional baseball career ==
Stringfellow also played minor league baseball as a catcher, outfielder, and first baseman. He played for the Meridian Bears of the Class B Southeastern League in 1940, the Charleston Rebels of the Class B South Atlantic League (SAL) from 1941 to 1942, the Nashville Volunteers of the Class AA Southern Association from 1946 to 1947, and in the Class A SAL for the Macon Peaches from 1947 to 1948, the Augusta Tigers in 1948, the Charleston Rebels in 1948, the Savannah Indians from 1949 to 1950, and the Jacksonville Tars in 1951.

== Personal life ==
During World War II, he served in the United States Army Air Forces and played football for the service team at Maxwell Field. He was also the baseball coach at Gunter Field and Mississippi Southern. In 1950, he was named deputy sheriff of Chatham County, Georgia. Stringfellow died on September 16, 1992, in Savannah, Georgia.
