= George Speth =

American football player (1918–2011)

No. 73, 22, 27
- Position: Tackle

Personal information
- Born: July 25, 1918; Buffalo, New York, U.S.
- Died: August 24, 2011 (aged 93); Port Richey, Florida, U.S.
- Listed height: 6 ft 2 in (1.88 m)
- Listed weight: 220 lb (100 kg)

Career information
- High school: Seneca Vocational (Buffalo)
- College: Murray State (1938–1941)
- NFL draft: 1942: 18th round, 165th overall pick

Career history
- Detroit Lions (1942); Charlotte Clippers (1946–1949)

Career NFL statistics
- Games played: 10
- Games started: 5
- Stats at Pro Football Reference

George Carl Speth (July 25, 1918 – August 24, 2011) was an American professional football player.

Speth was born in Buffalo, New York, in 1918. He attended and played for Seneca Vocational High School and then played college football at Murray State from 1938 to 1941. He was named by the Associated Press to the 1941 All-Kentucky Intercollegiate Athletic Conference football team.

He was selected 165th overall by the Detroit Lions in the 18th round of the 1942 NFL draft. He signed with the Lions in March 1942. He appeared in 11 NFL games, five as a starter at tackle for the Lions during the 1942 season. He earned $2,500 per week while playing for the Lions.

Speth served as a lieutenant in the Marine Corps during World War II. He struck a deal with the Marines to allow him to play one year in the NFL before going on active duty, where he also played a season with the 1943 Camp Lejeune Marines team. He then served in the battles of Peleliu and Okinawa as a platoon commander with the 5th Marines. After the war, he played four seasons at tackle for the Charlotte Clippers of the Dixie Football League from 1946 to 1949. He appeared in more than 50 games for the Clippers. He was selected by the Associated Press for the All-Dixie League team in 1946.

After his playing career ended, he worked as a coach at McKinley High School in Buffalo, New York. After retiring, he moved to Florida, where he died in 2011 in Port Richey, Florida.
