= Colonia, New Jersey =

Place in Middlesex County, New Jersey, United States

- Census-designated place
- Location in Middlesex County (left) and the state of New Jersey (right)

- Location within Middlesex County, New Jersey Location within New Jersey Location within the United States
- Coordinates: 40.594133°N 74.31377°W
- Country: United States
- State: New Jersey
- County: Middlesex
- Township: Woodbridge

Area
  - Total: 4.03 sq mi (10.45 km^{2})
  - Land: 4.03 sq mi (10.44 km^{2})
  - Water: 0.0039 sq mi (0.01 km^{2}) 0.11%
- Elevation: 69 ft (21 m)

Population (2020)
  - Total: 18,609
  - Density: 4,617.9/sq mi (1,782.99/km^{2})
- Time zone: UTC−05:00 (Eastern (EST))
  - Summer (DST): UTC−04:00 (Eastern (EDT))
- ZIP Code: 07067
- Area codes: 732/848
- FIPS code: 34-14380
- GNIS feature ID: 02389346

Colonia is an unincorporated community and census-designated place (CDP) in Woodbridge Township in Middlesex County in the U.S. state of New Jersey. As of the 2020 United States census, the CDP's population was 18,609.

== History ==
In 1919, the New Jersey State Highway Commission built a new road that became part of the Lincoln Highway, an early plan to create a transcontinental highway. The stretch was constructed on the west side of the Pennsylvania Railroad (now the Northeast Corridor) from near the northeast of Dow Avenue between Colonia and Iselin to Cedar Street in Menlo Park, to avoid two railroad crossings. The old road is now Middlesex-Essex Turnpike and Thornall Street, on the east side of the tracks.

== Geography ==
Colonia is in northeastern Middlesex County, in the northwest corner of Woodbridge Township. It is bordered to the north by Clark, to the northeast by Rahway, to the east by Avenel, to the south by Iselin, and to the west by Edison. Union County borders the community to the north and northeast. Newark is 13 miles (21 km) to the northeast, and New Brunswick, the Middlesex county seat, is 11 miles (18 km) to the southwest.

According to the U.S. Census Bureau, the Colonia CDP has a total area of 4.034 square miles (10.45 km^{2}), including 0.004 square miles (0.010 km^{2}) of water (0.10%). The community is drained to the northeast by the South Branch of the Rahway River, part of the watershed of the Arthur Kill. Colonia has a humid subtropical climate (Cfa) and average monthly temperatures range from 33 °F (1 °C) in January to 78.1 °F (25.6 °C) in July.

The Garden State Parkway passes through the western portion of the CDP but does not interchange there. For northbound Garden State Parkway traffic only there is a service plaza in Colonia; it is the parkway's only area located on private property.

In 2018 the president of the Historical Association of Woodbridge, Daniel D'Arcy, stated that "Colonia is to Woodbridge like the Bronx is to NYC. People like the identity."

== Demographics ==
Historical population
Census	Pop.	Note	%±
1990	18,238		—
2000	17,811		−2.3%
2010	17,795		−0.1%
2020	18,609		4.6%
Population sources: 1950 1960 1970; 1980 1990 2000; 2010 2020

Colonia first appeared as a census designated place in the 1990 U.S. census.

=== Racial and ethnic composition ===
Colonia CDP, New Jersey – Racial and ethnic composition Note: the US Census treats Hispanic/Latino as an ethnic category. This table excludes Latinos from the racial categories and assigns them to a separate category. Hispanics/Latinos may be of any race.
Race / Ethnicity (NH = Non-Hispanic)	Pop 2000	Pop 2010	Pop 2020	% 2000	% 2010	% 2020
White alone (NH)	14,713	13,084	11,426	82.61%	73.53%	61.40%
Black or African American alone (NH)	828	888	966	4.65%	4.99%	5.19%
Native American or Alaska Native alone (NH)	13	16	29	0.07%	0.09%	0.16%
Asian alone (NH)	1,120	1,892	3,049	6.29%	10.63%	16.38%
Native Hawaiian or Pacific Islander alone (NH)	10	2	2	0.06%	0.01%	0.01%
Other race alone (NH)	37	34	87	0.21%	0.19%	0.47%
Mixed race or Multiracial (NH)	204	230	499	1.15%	1.29%	2.68%
Hispanic or Latino (any race)	886	1,649	2,551	4.97%	9.27%	13.71%
Total	17,811	17,795	18,609	100.00%	100.00%	100.00%

=== 2020 census ===
As of the 2020 census, Colonia had a population of 18,609. The median age was 42.7 years. 20.6% of residents were under the age of 18 and 17.8% of residents were 65 years of age or older. For every 100 females there were 95.7 males, and for every 100 females age 18 and over there were 93.1 males age 18 and over.

100.0% of residents lived in urban areas, while 0.0% lived in rural areas.

There were 6,403 households in Colonia, of which 34.7% had children under the age of 18 living in them. Of all households, 64.9% were married-couple households, 11.6% were households with a male householder and no spouse or partner present, and 20.1% were households with a female householder and no spouse or partner present. About 17.0% of all households were made up of individuals and 9.5% had someone living alone who was 65 years of age or older.

There were 6,599 housing units, of which 3.0% were vacant. The homeowner vacancy rate was 1.2% and the rental vacancy rate was 2.1%.

Racial composition as of the 2020 census
Race	Number	Percent
White	11,982	64.4%
Black or African American	1,036	5.6%
American Indian and Alaska Native	38	0.2%
Asian	3,077	16.5%
Native Hawaiian and Other Pacific Islander	6	0.0%
Some other race	760	4.1%
Two or more races	1,710	9.2%
Hispanic or Latino (of any race)	2,551	13.7%

=== 2010 census ===
The 2010 United States census counted 17,795 people, 6,160 households, and 4,977 families in the CDP. The population density was 4,551.4 people per square mile (1,757.3 people/km^{2}). There were 6,321 housing units at an average density of 1,616.7 units per square mile (624.2 units/km^{2}). The racial makeup was 80.37% (14,302) White, 5.26% (936) Black or African American, 0.12% (21) Native American, 10.70% (1,904) Asian, 0.04% (8) Pacific Islander, 1.54% (274) from other races, and 1.97% (350) from two or more races. Hispanic or Latino of any race were 9.27% (1,649) of the population.

Of the 6,160 households, 34.8% had children under the age of 18; 65.6% were married couples living together; 11.3% had a female householder with no husband present and 19.2% were non-families. Of all households, 16.4% were made up of individuals and 8.9% had someone living alone who was 65 years of age or older. The average household size was 2.89 and the average family size was 3.25.

22.8% of the population were under the age of 18, 7.5% from 18 to 24, 24.4% from 25 to 44, 30.0% from 45 to 64, and 15.3% who were 65 years of age or older. The median age was 42.3 years. For every 100 females, the population had 93.2 males. For every 100 females ages 18 and older there were 90.6 males.

=== 2000 census ===
As of the 2000 United States census there were 17,811 people, 6,184 households, and 5,077 families residing in the CDP. The population density was 1,772.4 people/km^{2} (4,590 people/mi^{2}). There were 6,254 housing units at an average density of 622.3 units/km^{2} (1,612 units/mi^{2}). The racial makeup of the CDP was 86.00% White, 4.76% African American, 0.10% Native American, 6.31% Asian, 0.06% Pacific Islander, 1.27% from other races, and 1.50% from two or more races. Hispanic or Latino of any race were 4.97% of the population.

There were 6,184 households, out of which 35.0% had children under the age of 18 living with them, 68.7% were married couples living together, 10.3% had a female householder with no husband present, and 17.9% were non-families. 15.2% of all households were made up of individuals, and 8.7% had someone living alone who was 65 years of age or older. The average household size was 2.88 and the average family size was 3.21.

In the CDP the population was spread out, with 23.7% under the age of 18, 6.2% from 18 to 24, 29.1% from 25 to 44, 24.8% from 45 to 64, and 16.2% who were 65 years of age or older. The median age was 40 years. For every 100 females, there were 93.0 males. For every 100 females age 18 and over, there were 88.4 males.

The median income for a household in the CDP was $67,372, and the median income for a family was $76,090. Males had a median income of $50,260 versus $36,657 for females. The per capita income for the CDP was $27,732. About 1.5% of families and 2.2% of the population were below the poverty line, including 2.0% of those under age 18 and 4.0% of those age 65 or over.

== Parks and recreation ==
Merrill Park is a Middlesex County park located on the South Branch of the Rahway River. The park was created as a "Progressive Playground" and spans 179 acres (72 ha). The park's maintenance is handled by funding from the municipality, local schools, community groups and local businesses. Merrill Park includes four tennis courts, three baseball fields, a soccer field, seven picnic groves that can be reserved in advance, the progressive playground, a football field, two basketball courts, two softball fields, two open picnic groves, and three other playgrounds. The football field and soccer field are surrounded by a walkway for joggers as well. There are numerous small trails around the park.

== Education ==
Public schools

Schools in Colonia operated as part of the Woodbridge Township School District are:

Elementary schools (K-5)

- Claremont Avenue Elementary School #20 - Claremont Avenue, Colonia
- Lynn Crest Elementary School #22 - New Dover Road, Colonia
- Oak Ridge Heights Elementary School #21 - Inman Avenue
- Pennsylvania Avenue Elementary School #27 - Pennsylvania Avenue

Middle school (6th-8th)

- Colonia Middle School - Delaware Avenue

High school (9th-12th)

- Colonia High School - East Street

Private/religious school (K-8th)

- St. John Vianney Grammar School - 420 Inman Avenue

== Notable people ==
People who were born in, residents of, or otherwise closely associated with Colonia include:

- Chad Baker-Mazara (born 2000), college basketball player for the Auburn Tigers
- John Carlson (born 1990), defenseman and Stanley Cup champion (2018) with the Washington Capitals
- John Gorka (born 1958), contemporary folk singer/songwriter
- Kelsey Grammer (born 1955), actor who appeared in Frasier and Cheers
- Tom Higgins (born 1954), former American and Canadian football player
- Stewart Krentzman (born 1951), CEO of Oki Data Americas, Inc.
- Eric LeGrand (born 1990), defensive tackle with the Rutgers Scarlet Knights football team who was paralyzed during a game
- Glen Mason (born 1950), NCAA football coach
- Laura McCullough (born 1960), poet
- Zack Rosen (born 1989), All-American basketball player at Penn; plays for Maccabi Ashdod in Israel
- Bret Schundler (born 1959), New Jersey Republican politician
- Tico Torres (born 1953), drummer for Bon Jovi
- Jimmy James (born 1959 as James Fyke), musician who performs with Tommy Tutone

== See also ==
- List of neighborhoods in Woodbridge Township, New Jersey
- List of neighborhoods in Edison, New Jersey
