= Hunterdon Central Regional High School =

School district in Hunterdon County, New Jersey, United States

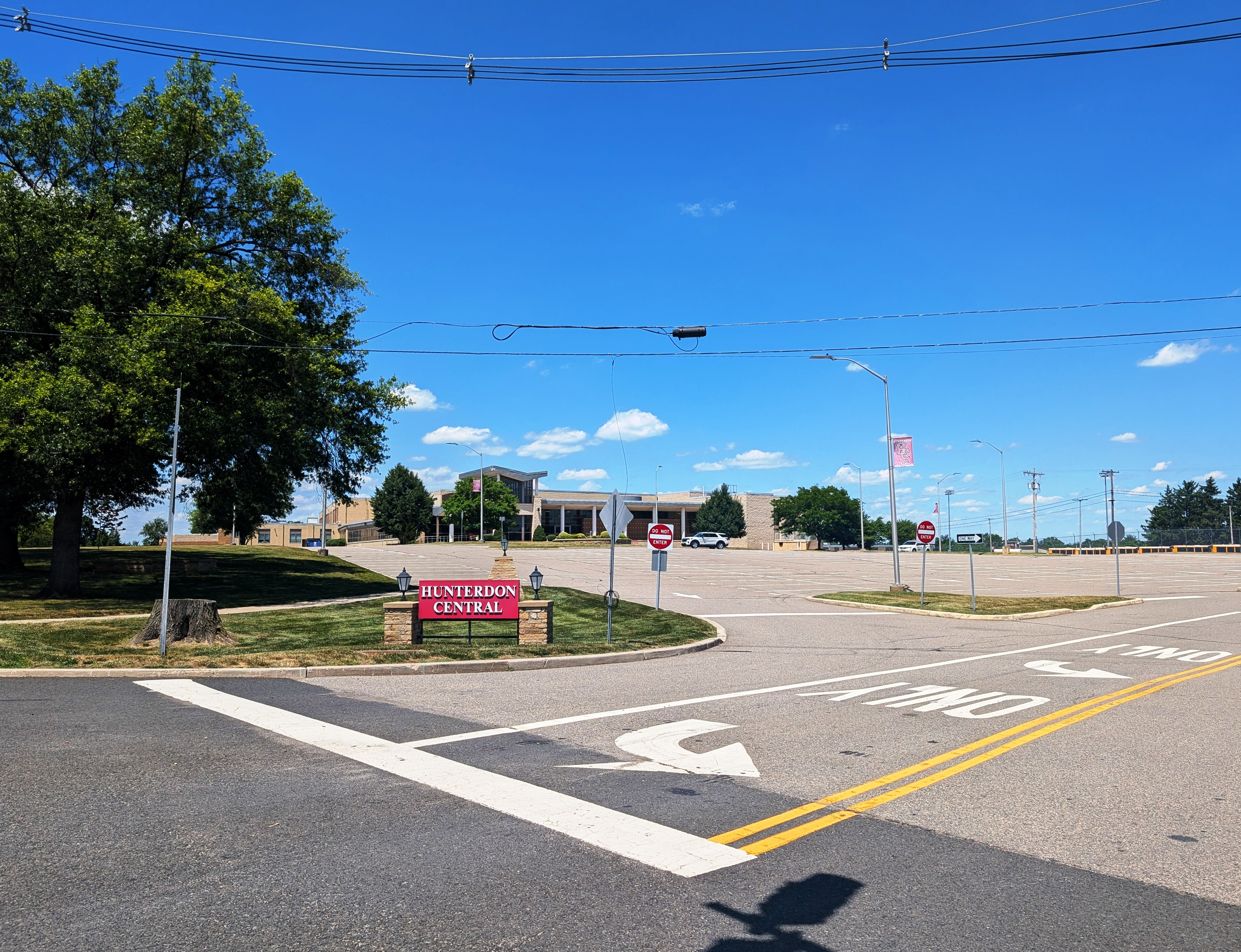

Address
- 84 Route 31 Flemington, Hunterdon County, New Jersey, 08822; United States

District information
- Grades: 9th-12th
- Superintendent: Jessica Cangelosi-Hade
- Business administrator: Heather Spitzer
- Schools: 1

Students and staff
- Enrollment: 2,246 (as of 2024–25)
- Faculty: 217.2 FTEs
- Student–teacher ratio: 10.3:1

Other information
- District Factor Group: I
- Website: www.hcrhs.org
Ind.	Per pupil	District spending	Rank (*)	9-12 average	%± vs. average
1A	Total Spending	$20,523	26	$18,891	8.6%
1	Budgetary Cost	17,569	38	15,592	12.7%
2	Classroom Instruction	9,557	33	8,807	8.5%
6	Support Services	3,319	44	2,294	44.7%
8	Administrative Cost	1,398	9	1,592	−12.2%
10	Operations & Maintenance	2,290	40	1,954	17.2%
13	Extracurricular Activities	809	21	873	−7.3%
16	Median Teacher Salary	65,131	17	71,726
Data from NJDoE 2014 Taxpayers' Guide to Education Spending. *Of 9-12 districts with any number of students. Lowest spending=1; Highest=47

Hunterdon Central Regional High School

Location
- 40.515813°N 74.852882°W

Information
- Type: Public
- Established: 1956
- NCES School ID: 340759003006
- Principal: Edward Brandt
- Faculty: 217.2 FTEs
- Grades: 9-12
- Enrollment: 2,238 (as of 2024–25)
- Student to teacher ratio: 10.3:1
- Colors: Red black
- Athletics conference: Skyland Conference (general); Big Central Football Conference (football)
- Team name: Red Devils
- Publication: The Lamp

Hunterdon Central Regional High School is a comprehensive, four-year public high school, and regional school district that serves students from five municipalities in east central Hunterdon County, in the U.S. state of New Jersey. Students from Delaware Township, East Amwell Township, Flemington, Raritan Township and Readington Township attend the school. It is the district's only school.

As of the 2024–25 school year, the school had an enrollment of 2,238 students and 217.2 classroom teachers (on an FTE basis), for a student–teacher ratio of 10.3:1. There were 347 students (15.5% of enrollment) eligible for free lunch and 82 (3.7% of students) eligible for reduced-cost lunch.

The district participates in the Interdistrict Public School Choice Program, which allows non-resident students to attend school in the district at no cost to their parents, with tuition covered by the resident district. Available slots are announced annually by grade.

== District and school history ==
The Hunterdon Central Regional High School School District was created by referendum on April 4, 1954, and the high school opened in the former Route 69 Elementary School in September 1956. There were a few impetuses that led to the creation of the district. Before 1956, public school students of the school districts of Delaware, East Amwell and Readington Townships were sent to Flemington High School as tuition students, but these districts had no voice on the Flemington-Raritan Board of Education, which administered the school. Additionally, Flemington High's facilities could no longer support the growing student population, nor could its plant support the offering of a more broad-based curriculum that was becoming standard among American high schools in the post-WWII era. A statute passed by the New Jersey Legislature in 1931 permitted two or more municipalities to create regionalized school districts so that all member municipalities had representation and authority as members of a regional board of education, as well as the benefit of being able to pool tax resources and share the cost of running a school district.

When the new HCRHS Board of Education purchased the Route 69 elementary school, its facilities were expanded to accommodate 1,000 students with the passage of a bond act in December 1954. The Board selected Robert Shoff to be the district's first superintendent. When the school opened in 1956 most of the program and faculty from the former Flemington High School was transported to the new school and district.

Throughout the 1960s, HCRHS expanded its curriculum to offer vocational training, work force and college education. The new facilities allowed for a more varied curriculum including an expanded world languages program, agricultural education programs, a music and performing arts program (curricular, co-curricular and extra-curricular) and continuing expansion of the Red Devils athletic program. Additionally, the physical plant was expanded in 1962 and then again in a massive expansion begun in 1969. By 1970 the campus consisted of the 9/10 building, the 11/12 building, a separate Instructional Media Center (library), a fieldhouse and separate fine arts building. Connecting all of these buildings to one another was a covered walkway to shield students from the elements when passing from class to class.

In 1974, radio station WCVH-FM 90.5 began broadcasting from the campus of Hunterdon Central, and it was the first NJ radio station to be part of the National Public Radio network. WCVH still features student programming as well as programs of local interest.

Since 1987, Hunterdon Central has had the word "Regional" as an official part of its name. Prior to that it was known as Hunterdon Central High School. Other plant renovations occurred in the 1980s, and in 1984 lights were installed on the football field.

In the 1990s Hunterdon Central embarked upon massive upgrades to the facility and infrastructure. Former superintendent Raymond Farley committed the district to embracing educational technology, and to this day the high school is known for embracing the use of technology as a tool of learning and education. In the late 1990s, the 11/12 building was expanded with the addition of 34 classrooms and the Commons. Elevators were also added to the 9/10 campus as the result of a lawsuit filed against the district by student who used a wheelchair and was unable to navigate all parts of that campus. In this decade WCVH moved to its present location in the newly renovated and expanded Communications Building (formerly the Fine Arts Building), and HCTV, Hunterdon Central's own cable television station, began broadcasting.

The 2000s saw the most recent expansion of the Hunterdon Central facilities with the addition of 23 new classrooms, a gymnasium and the complete renovation of all 47 classrooms in the 9/10 building. Air conditioning was also installed in the 9/10 building and athletic fields received upgrades. HCRHS also began random drug testing of students participating in athletics, co-curricular activities, extra-curricular activities and parking on campus. This was in response to indications that there was a dangerous level of drug use among students at HCRHS, including more than 30% who had indicated in surveys that they had used drugs in the previous year and 27 students who had tested positive after undergoing drug tests that had been performed based on reasonable suspicion that the students had been using drugs. Through this program the district attempts to get help and assistance to students who test positive for illegal drugs, as well as to further its commitment to anti-drug education. Some students and parent accepted the testing as a reasonable way to deter students from using drugs and participating in unhealthy lifestyles. The policy was challenged by members of the community and students who believed that it was unjustified and invaded student privacy, eventually taking the case to the Supreme Court of New Jersey. In Joye, et al. v Hunterdon Central HCRHS was found not to be in violation of a student's right to be free from search and seizure, but the court did not comment on the merits of the random drug testing policy. All HCRHS students wishing to participate in any of these activities, or to park on campus, must submit their names to the random drug testing pool. Other schools in the state and region have adopted policies similar to Hunterdon Central's.

Technology plays an important role in instruction at Hunterdon Central and its use in the classroom continues to grow. Teachers are required to use services such as Moodle, Wikispaces or Google Sites to maintain resources and materials for the courses that they teach. In March 2012 the district fully opened its bring your own device (BYOD) program to students, faculty and staff. In Spring 2013, work was completed on a second pedestrian bridge over the creek that separates the 11/12 campus from the rest of the buildings at Hunterdon Central, which alleviated congestion on the existing pedestrian bridge during passing times.

In December 2015, Sireen Hashem, a former history teacher at Hunterdon Central, made international news when she filed a lawsuit against her former employer alleging that the school discriminated against her as a Muslim American and American of Palestinian descent. In part, the suit alleges that Hashen was fired in April 2015 after the school received complaints from a "local rabbi and several parents" that Hashen had shown her class a video on the subject of Nobel Peace Prize winner Malala Yousafzai, a video a non-Muslim colleague had allegedly shown a different class without incident.

The district had been classified by the New Jersey Department of Education as being in District Factor Group "I", the second-highest of eight groupings. District Factor Groups organize districts statewide to allow comparison by common socioeconomic characteristics of the local districts. From lowest socioeconomic status to highest, the categories are A, B, CD, DE, FG, GH, I and J.

== Awards, recognition and rankings ==
In the 2024 Best U.S. High Schools rankings by U.S. News & World Report, Hunterdon Central Regional High School was ranked 14th among high schools in New Jersey. Excluding magnet and STEM schools, it was ranked second among general public high schools in the state. Additionally, the school was ranked 45th in the New York City Metropolitan Area and was ranked 258th nationally. According to the magazine's scorecard, 52% of students took at least one Advanced Placement (AP) Exam, with 81% passing at least one of those exams.

For the 1997–98 school year, Hunterdon Central Regional High School was recognized with the National Blue Ribbon Award of Excellence from the United States Department of Education, the highest honor that an American school can achieve, is awarded for excellence in instructional delivery and educational environment. In 2002, Hunterdon Central was awarded the Blue Ribbon School award for the second time, one of a limited number of schools across the state to be recognized on two separate occasions.

The school was the first in the State of New Jersey to be designated as a Star School by the New Jersey Department of Education, the highest honor that a New Jersey school can achieve, and has been recognized with this award three times, in 1993–94, 1994–95, and 1997–98.

The school was the 44th-ranked public high school in New Jersey out of 339 schools statewide in New Jersey Monthly magazine's September 2014 cover story on the state's "Top Public High Schools", using a new ranking methodology. The school had been ranked 84th in the state of 328 schools in 2012, after being ranked 85th in 2010 out of 322 schools listed. The magazine ranked the school 62nd in 2008 out of 316 schools. The school was ranked 57th in the magazine's September 2006 issue, which included 316 schools across the state. Schooldigger.com ranked the school 81st out of 376 public high schools statewide in its 2010 rankings (an increase of 4 positions from the 2009 rank) which were based on the combined percentage of students classified as proficient or above proficient on the language arts literacy and mathematics components of the High School Proficiency Assessment (HSPA).

For the 2005–06 school year, the district was recognized with the "Best Practices Award" by the New Jersey Department of Education for its "Books Breaking Barriers: The ESL Literature Circle" World Languages program at Hunterdon Central Regional High School.

In a February 2004 radio address, President George W. Bush credited random drug testing at Hunterdon Central as resulting in significant cuts in drug use and quoted the school's principal as saying that the school now had "a tool that was making a large difference", cutting drug use by students in half in the three years since the random selection and testing plan had been implemented. On December 11, 2007, President Bush thanked Hunterdon Central for "feeling as passionate as we do and working as hard as we do" at a meeting with Principal Christine Steffner and Superintendent Lisa Brady at the White House as part of a round table discussion with other individuals who have been active in programs that cut drug use by teens.

In 2011, the FIRST Robotics Competition Team 3637 was awarded the Rookie Inspiration Award and in 2012 made it to the MAR Regional Championships.

== School facilities ==
Hunterdon Central has a 72-acre (290,000 m^{2}) campus that consists of two large classroom buildings (9/10 campus and 11/12 campus), a centrally located library called the Instructional Media Center (IMC), a Music building, a Communications Building and a Field House which can accommodate 2000 people. Its Auditorium can hold 900 people and its Little Theatre can seat 280. Its athletic facilities consist of the Stewart Athletic Complex in addition to other playing fields, and tennis courts, throughout the campus.

== Administration ==
District and school administration members include:

District

- Jessica Cangelosi-Hade, superintendent
- Heather Spitzer, business administrator and board secretary

Cangelosi-Hade, who was previously the district's assistant superintendent, was appointed in August 2024 in a unanimous vote by the school board to succeed Jeffrey Moore, who became the assistant superintendent in the Mamaroneck Union Free School District in New York. Charles Michael Shaddow served as interim superintendent from March 2024 to August 2024.

The school's principal is Edward Brandt. His core administration team includes four vice principals, one for each grade.

=== Board of education ===
The district's board of education, comprised of nine members, sets policy and oversees the fiscal and educational operation of the district through its administration. As a Type II school district, the board's trustees are elected directly by voters to serve three-year terms of office on a staggered basis, with three seats up for election each year held (since 2012) as part of the November general election. The board appoints a superintendent to oversee the district's day-to-day operations and a business administrator to supervise the business functions of the district. All Board of Education Members serve as volunteers. Seats on the board of education are allocated based in the population of the five constituent municipalities who participate in the school district, with four members elected from Raritan Township, two from Readington Townships, and one each from Delaware Township, East Amwell Township and the Borough of Flemington; based on the results of the 2020 census, Raritan Township gained one seat and Readington Township lost one.

== Staff ==
The faculty are divided among eight academic departments: English, Mathematics, Science, Social Studies, World Language, Business/Fine Arts/Music/Design Technology, Health and Physical Education & Family and Consumer Sciences, and Special Services.

== Academics and curriculum ==
Hunterdon Central offers a broad curriculum that consists of the core required courses for graduation as legislated by the State of New Jersey. In addition, it offers students electives in each academic department, including Advanced Placement and honors courses. The Program of Studies provides details on graduation requirements and individual course curriculum for students attending Hunterdon Central.

== Extracurricular activities ==
Extracurricular activities at the high school include baseball, boys' and girls' basketball, boys' and girls' bowling, cheerleading, boys' and girls' cross country, boys' and girls' fencing, field hockey, football, boys' and girls' golf, gymnastics, boys' and girls' lacrosse, ice hockey, boys' and girls' soccer, softball, boys' and girls' swimming, boys' and girls' tennis, boys' and girls' track and winter track, boys' and girls' volleyball, color guard, and wrestling. Other activities offered include dramatics, student government, publications, service organizations, clubs, marching band and orchestra, an Air Force Junior Reserve Officers' Training Corps program, a chapter of the Junior Statesmen of America, a chapter of Amnesty International, a chapter of Future Business Leaders of America, choral programs, and a FIRST Robotics Competition Team (Team 3637).

The Marching Band, or Marching Red Devils has won awards in state, regional and all-state competitions.

The school's radio station, 90.5 FM WCVH, features current country music. The call letters stand for "Community Voice of Hunterdon (county)".

== Athletics ==
Hunterdon Central Regional High School Red Devils compete in the Skyland Conference, which is comprised of public and private high schools in Hunterdon, Somerset and Warren counties, and operates under the supervision of the New Jersey State Interscholastic Athletic Association (NJSIAA). With 2,178 students in grades 10-12, the school was classified by the NJSIAA for the 2019–20 school year as Group IV for most athletic competition purposes, which included schools with an enrollment of 1,060 to 5,049 students in that grade range. The football team competes in Division 5B of the Big Central Football Conference, which includes 60 public and private high schools in Hunterdon, Middlesex, Somerset, Union and Warren counties, which are broken down into 10 divisions by size and location. The school was classified by the NJSIAA as Group V South for football for 2024–2026, which included schools with 1,333 to 2,324 students.

The NJSIAA recognized the school as Group IV winner of the ShopRite Cup in 2007–08, with first-places finishes in baseball, football, boys lacrosse and girls volleyball; second place in field hockey (tied), boys golf, girls golf and winter track relays and fourth place in gymnastics, plus bonus points for having no disqualifications for the winter and spring seasons. They won again in Group IV in 2010–11, awarded for first-place finishes in softball and boys' golf; second in boys' soccer, football, boys' lacrosse and girls' golf; third in girls' cross country, girls' volleyball (tied) and wrestling (tied), and fourth in boys' fencing, plus bonus points for having no disqualifications for the fall and spring seasons.

The varsity cheerleading team has had success, both within the state of New Jersey and at the national level. The team won first place in their division at the 2012 UCA National High School Championships, while the junior varsity ranked third in their division. The team taken the title of New Jersey Group IV State Champion in 09–10, 02–03, 00–01, and 98-99 and took 2nd Place nationally at UCA National High School Finals in 2003 and 2011. The cheerleading team won the NJCDCA Group IV state championship title in 2017. Both Junior Varsity and Varsity took first place at the 2017 UCA High School Cheerleading National Championship.

The football team won the Central Jersey Group IV state sectional championships in 1979, 1998, 1999 and 2006, and repeated in 2007 in North II Group IV and in 2013 in Central Jersey Group V. The team won the program's first playoff-era title in 1979 with a 27-16 win against Matawan Regional High School in the Central Jersey Group IV playoff finals to finish the season with a 10-1 record. In 1998, the team finished at 12-0 after winning the Central Jersey Group IV state sectional title with a 42–6 victory over Piscataway High School in the tournament final at Giants Stadium. Down 21-14 at the half, the 1999 team roared back to defeat Piscataway by a score of 42-14 in the Central Jersey Group IV final to finish the season at 11-1. The team won the 2006 Central Jersey Group IV championship, beating Howell High School, 42–24, and was ranked #2 in Central New Jersey by the Courier News. The 2007 team won the North II, Group IV sectional title, defeating Piscataway High School 23–13 in a game played at Rutgers Stadium. The team finished the 2013 season with an 8-4 record after winning the Central Jersey Group V state sectional championship at Rutgers University against Manalapan High School by a score of 21–0, which had come unbeaten into the tournament final.

The girls cross country team won the Group IV state championship in 1979, 1994 and 2000. The girls cross country team won the Meet of Champions in 1979, 1993 and 2000; the program's four state team titles are tied for fifth-most in the state.

The boys' wrestling team won the Central Jersey Group IV state sectional title in 1980-1984, 1987, 1988, 1993-1995, 1997-2000 and 2003, won the North Jersey II Group IV title in 2010, 2011 and 2013, and won the Central Jersey Group V title in 2015, 2017 and 2019. The team won the Group IV state title in 1989. The team became a state powerhouse under coach Russell Riegel who won 533 matches with Hunterdon Central. The Hunterdon Central Invitational Wrestling Tournament (HCIWT) is the longest running holiday tournament in the nation.

The baseball team won the Group IV state championship in 1987 (defeating Elizabeth High School in the tournament final), 2008 (vs. North Hunterdon High School), 2009 (vs. Randolph High School), 2016 (vs. Morristown High School) and 2018 (vs. Westfield High School). The program's five state titles are tied for tenth-most in the state. The team finished the 2018 season with a record of 28-2 after winning the Group IV title with a 7-0 win against Westfield in the tournament final.

The field hockey team won the Central Jersey Group IV state sectional championship in 1992-1994 and 1996-1998, the team won the North II Group IV title in 2001-2004, 2007, 2011, 2013 and 2019. The team won the Group IV state title in 1993 (defeating runner-up Vernon Township High School in the finals), 1994 (vs. Randolph High School) and 1996 (vs. Vernon Township). In 2007, the field hockey team won the North II, Group IV state sectional championship with a 2–1 win over Middletown High School North in the tournament final. The team won the Group IV title in 1996 with a 2-0 win against Vernon Township.

The softball team won the Group IV state championship in 1999 (defeating Paramus High School in the tournament final) and 2011 (vs. Howell High School). The team finished the 1999 season with a 24-4 record after winning the Group IV title in with a 3-2 win against Paramus.

The girls' volleyball team has won the Group IV state championship six times; in 2002 over Westfield High School, in 2006 against East Brunswick High School, in 2007 vs. North Hunterdon High School, in 2014 vs. Ridge High School, 2015 vs. Williamstown High School and 2016 vs. Bridgewater-Raritan High School. In both 2006 and 2007, the team advanced to the finals of the Tournament of Champions, losing in 2006 to Northern Valley Regional High School at Demarest and to Immaculate Heart Academy in 2007.

The boys' lacrosse team won the Group IV state championship in 2005 (against runner-up Montclair High School in the tournament final), 2006 (vs. Montclair), 2007 (vs. Montclair) and 2008 (vs. Bridgewater-Raritan High School), becoming the first public school to win four consecutive state titles, and won in 2021 (vs.Southern Regional High School). The program's five state titles are tied for eighth in the state. In 2006, number-three seed Hunterdon Central defeated top-seed Montclair in the Group IV final, by a score of 10–9 in overtime. The team won its fourth straight title in 2008 with a 9–8 win against Bridgewater-Raritan in the tournament final, making a fourth-quarter comeback after being down by as many as four goals.

The men's foil team captured the state squad title in fencing from 2010 to 2013.

The girls' swimming team won the Public A state championship in 2014.

The girls' soccer team won the Group IV state title in 2016 (against runner-up Ridge High School in the championship game) and 2019 (vs. Scotch Plains-Fanwood High School).

The boys' soccer team finished the 2016 season with a record of 20-1 after winning the Group IV state championship by defeating Scotch Plains-Fanwood High School by a score of 1-0 at Kean University in the tournament final.

The ice hockey team won the Public A state championship in 2018 and had won the Monsignor Kelly Cup in 2009. The team finished the 2018 season with a 16-7-3 record after winning the Public A championship game at the Prudential Center by a score of 5-1 against the Woodbridge Township co-op team (comprised of Colonia High School, John F. Kennedy Memorial High School and Woodbridge High School).

== Notable alumni ==
- Hannah Altman (born 1995), photographer, whose artwork explores lineage, memory, ritual and storytelling
- Emma Bell (born 1986), actress
- Jen Bryant (born 1960, class of 1978), poet, novelist and children's author
- Jason Cabinda (born 1996, class of 2014), free agent fullback who most recently played for the Detroit Lions of the National Football League
- Lauren Cho (1990–2021, class of 2009), who disappeared and was later found dead in the Yucca Valley of California
- Vera Farmiga (born 1973, class of 1991), Academy-Award nominated actress whose films include The Departed and Up in the Air
- Danny Federici (1950–2008), musician, player for Bruce Springsteen's E Street Band
- Ryan Godown (born 1975, class of 1994), professional dirt modified racing driver
- Kimi Goetz (born 1994, class of 2012), speed skater who represented the United States at the 2022 Winter Olympics
- Matt Ioannidis (born 1994), retired defensive end who played for the Washington Redskins / Football Team and Carolina Panthers of the National Football League
- Marcia A. Karrow (born 1959, class of 1977), former member of the New Jersey Legislature who represented the 23rd legislative district in the General Assembly from 2006 to 2009 and the State Senate in 2009. She is currently the mayor of Flemington, New Jersey (2023–present)
- Tom Keeley (class of 1997), guitarist for the band Thursday
- Robyn Kenney (born 1979, class of 1997), field hockey player
- Garrett LeRose (born c. 1985), college football coach who is head coach for Washington and Lee Generals football team
- Tom Malloy (born 1974, class of 1993), actor/writer/producer, of the films The Alphabet Killer and Love N' Dancing
- Emily Mason (born 2002), professional soccer player who plays as a defender for Seattle Reign FC of the National Women's Soccer League
- Mallory McMorrow (born 1986, class of 2004), politician who has served in the Michigan Senate since 2019
- Darrin Miller (born 1965, class of 1983), former professional football player who played in the NFL for the Seattle Seahawks
- Kent Osborne (born 1969), screenwriter, animator, actor, and director who worked on SpongeBob SquarePants, Kiff, and The SpongeBob SquarePants Movie
- Mark Osborne (born 1970, class of 1988), movie director, Kung Fu Panda and More
- Billy Pauch (born 1957), racecar driver
- Timothy Piazza (1997–2017), Pennsylvania State University student who was killed as a result of hazing taken place at Beta Theta Pi fraternity
- Lansing Pilch (class of 1989), retired United States Air Force major general
- Michael Steven Pohle Jr. (class of 2002), killed in the 2007 Virginia Tech massacre
- Gabby Provenzano (born 1999), professional soccer player who plays as a midfielder or center back for Portland Thorns FC in the National Women's Soccer League
- Tucker Richardson, college basketball player for the Colgate Raiders
- Richard Rubin (born 1983, class of 2001), actor and television personality best known for starring on the first season of the Ashton Kutcher-produced reality TV series Beauty and the Geek
- Tucker Rule (class of 1997), drummer for the band Thursday
- Gerhard Schwedes (born 1938, class of 1956), football player
- Alex Shaffer (born 1993), actor featured in the 2011 film Win Win
- Frank Snook (born 1949), former relief pitcher who played for the San Diego Padres
- Marc Tedeschi (born 1956, class of 1974), martial artist, designer, photographer, writer and educator
- Brian White (born 1996), soccer player who plays as a forward for Vancouver Whitecaps FC in Major League Soccer
- Sam Zeloof (born 1999 or 2000, class of 2018), autodidact who, at the age of 17, constructed a home microchip fabrication facility in his garage
