= Angel Say No =

1980 single by Tommy Tutone

Single by Tommy Tutone

from the album Tommy Tutone
- B-side: "The Blame"
- Released: 1980
- Genre: New wave, pop rock
- Length: 3:10
- Label: Columbia
- Songwriters: Jim Keller; Tommy Heath
- Producers: Ed Thacker; Brian Leshon; Phil Jost

Tommy Tutone singles chronology
"Angel Say No" (1980)	"867-5309/Jenny" (1981)

"Angel Say No" is a song by American rock band Tommy Tutone and the lead single from their self-titled debut studio album (1980). A new wave song, it peaked at number 38 on the Billboard Hot 100 in June 1980.

== Composition ==
Mark Deming of AllMusic wrote the song "recalls Tom Petty's earlier sides with its lean but muscular arrangement and pleading lyric". The lyrics find the narrator urging a woman to heed his warnings.

== Track listing ==
No.	Title	Length
1.	"Angel Say No"	3:10
2.	"The Blame"	3:02

== Personnel ==
Tommy Tutone

- Tommy Heath – rhythm guitar, lead vocals, keyboards
- Jim Keller – lead guitar, backing vocals
- Terry Nails – bass, backing vocals
- Micky Shine – drums, backing vocals, percussion

Production

- Ed Thacker – production, engineering
- Brian Leshon – production
- Phil Jost – production

== Charts ==
Chart (1980)	Peak position
US Billboard Hot 100	38
