= Steal Away (disambiguation) =

Steal Away might refer to:

- "Steal Away", an American spiritual from prior to 1860
- "Steal Away" (Jimmy Hughes song), a 1964 song
- "Steal Away" (Robbie Dupree song), a 1980 song
- "Steal Away (The Night)", a 1980 song by Ozzy Osbourne
- "Steal Away", a 1980 song from Ambient 2: The Plateaux of Mirror by Harold Budd and Brian Eno
- "Steal Away", a 1981 song from Tommy Tutone 2 by Tommy Tutone
- Steal Away (album), a 2012 album by pianist Hank Jones and bassist Charlie Haden
- Steal Away (film), a 2025 film directed by Clement Virgo and starring Angourie Rice and Mallori Johnson
