= Tommy Tutone 2 =

Studio album by Tommy Tutone
- Released: September 23, 1981
- Recorded: 1981
- Genres: Power pop; pop rock
- Length: 38:29
- Label: Columbia/CBS Records
- Producers: Chuck Plotkin; Tommy Tutone; Jim Keller; Geoff Workman

Tommy Tutone chronology
Tommy Tutone (1980)	Tommy Tutone 2 (1981)	National Emotion (1983)

Professional ratings
Review scores
Source	Rating
AllMusic	3.5/5 stars

Tommy Tutone 2 is the second album by rock band Tommy Tutone, released in 1981. It features its biggest hit, "867-5309/Jenny". The first two albums by the band were re-released by the Collectable label as a two-albums-on-one-CD release in 1997. John Cowsill of the Cowsills appears on backing vocals and plays percussion on the album.

In October 2006, VH1 listed "867-5309/Jenny" as the 36th-greatest song of the 1980s.

== Track listing ==
=== Side one ===
1. "867-5309/Jenny" (Alex Call, Jim Keller) – 3:46
2. "Baby It's Alright" (Tommy Heath, Keller) – 3:23
3. "Shadow on the Road Ahead" (Rita Abrams, Heath) – 3:36
4. "Bernadiah" (Heath, Keller) – 5:29
5. "Why Baby Why" (Heath, Keller) – 2:58

=== Side two ===
1. "Which Man Are You" (Heath, Keller) – 2:50
2. "No Way to Cry" (Heath) – 3:07
3. "Steal Away" (David Gilman, Keller) – 3:50
4. "Tonight" (Brian Dalton, Heath) – 2:41
5. "Only One" (Keller) – 3:24
6. "Not Say Goodbye" (Keller) – 3:26

== Personnel ==
- Tommy Heath – lead vocals, rhythm guitar, piano
- Jim Keller – lead guitar, vocals; bass guitar (on Side 2)
- Jon Lyons – bass guitar (on Side 1)
- Victor Carberry – drums (on Side 1)

=== Additional musicians ===
- Steve LeGassick – keyboards (became an official member of the band by 1982)
- Rick Cutler – drums (on Side 2)
- Lonnie Turner – bass guitar (on Side 2)
- John Cowsill – percussion, harmony vocals (tracks A1-2)
- Sam Clayton – percussion (track A4)

== Production ==
- Tracks A1-A5: Produced by Chuck Plotkin and Tutone-Keller (sic), engineered by Toby Scott
- Tracks B1-B6: Produced and engineered by Geoff Workman
- Assistant engineers: Catharina Masters, John Weaver

== Charts ==
=== Weekly charts ===
Chart (1982)	Peak position
Canada Albums	44
U.S. Billboard Top LPs & Tape	20

=== Year-end charts ===
Chart (1982)	Peak position
U.S. Billboard Top Pop Albums	88

=== Singles ===
Single	Chart	Position
"867-5309 (Jenny)"	Canada (RPM)	2
"867-5309 (Jenny)"	Official New Zealand Music Chart	32
"867-5309 (Jenny)"	U.S.Billboard Hot 100	4
"867-5309 (Jenny)"	U.S. Billboard Rock Tracks	1
"Which Man Are You?"	U.S. Billboard Bubbling Under Hot 100	1
