= Colonia High School =

High school in Middlesex County, New Jersey, United States

Location
- 180 East Street; Woodbridge Township, Middlesex County, New Jersey 07067; United States; 40°35′31″N 74°19′15″W

Information
- Type: Public high school
- Established: 1967
- School district: Woodbridge Township School District
- NCES School ID: 341812003668
- Principal: Christopher Chiera
- Faculty: 122.0 FTEs
- Grades: 9th-12th
- Enrollment: 1,354 (as of 2024–25)
- Student to teacher ratio: 11.1:1
- Colors: Blue and Gold
- Athletics conference: Greater Middlesex Conference (general); Big Central Football Conference (football)
- Mascot: The Patriot
- Team name: Patriots
- Accreditation: Middle States Association of Colleges and Schools
- Newspaper: The Declaration
- Yearbook: The Arch
- Website: www.woodbridge.k12.nj.us/o/chs

Colonia High School is a four-year comprehensive public high school that serves students in ninth through twelfth grades in the Colonia section of Woodbridge Township in Middlesex County, in the U.S. state of New Jersey. It operates as part of the Woodbridge Township School District, along with two other high schools, John F. Kennedy Memorial High School and Woodbridge High School. The school has been accredited by the Middle States Association of Colleges and Schools Commission on Elementary and Secondary Schools since 1973; In Fall 2018, the school's accreditation status was extended for seven years, through July 2026.

As of the 2024–25 school year, the school had an enrollment of 1,354 students and 122.0 classroom teachers (on an FTE basis), for a student–teacher ratio of 11.1:1. There were 455 students (33.6% of enrollment) eligible for free lunch and 116 (8.6% of students) eligible for reduced-cost lunch.

In 2022, Woodbridge investigated an apparent cluster of more than 100 brain tumor patients who were Colonia High School employees or students since its construction in 1967. State health officials found that the tumors were somewhat more prevalent than expected, but no radiation hazards were detected in or around the school. An environmental scientist who is a school parent conducted her own testing in 2022, which revealed the presence of PCBs above permitted levels and of banned pesticides.

== History ==
Colonia High School was established in 1967.

== Awards, recognition and rankings ==
The school was the 127th-ranked public high school in New Jersey out of 339 schools statewide in New Jersey Monthly magazine's September 2014 cover story on the state's "Top Public High Schools", using a new ranking methodology. The school had been ranked 182nd in the state of 328 schools in 2012, after being ranked 192nd in 2010 out of 322 schools listed. The magazine ranked the school 188th in 2008 out of 316 schools. The school was ranked 208th in the magazine's September 2006 issue, which surveyed 316 schools across the state. Schooldigger.com ranked the school tied for 93rd out of 381 public high schools statewide in its 2011 rankings (an increase of 61 positions from the 2010 ranking) which were based on the combined percentage of students classified as proficient or above proficient on the mathematics (86.2%) and language arts literacy (97.6%) components of the High School Proficiency Assessment (HSPA).

== Athletics ==
The Colonia High School Patriots compete in the Greater Middlesex Conference, which is comprised of public and private high schools located in the greater Middlesex County area and operates under the supervision of the New Jersey State Interscholastic Athletic Association (NJSIAA). With 1,023 students in grades 10-12, the school was classified by the NJSIAA for the 2019–20 school year as Group III for most athletic competition purposes, which included schools with an enrollment of 761 to 1,058 students in that grade range. The football team competes in Division 4 of the Big Central Football Conference, which includes 60 public and private high schools in Hunterdon, Middlesex, Somerset, Union and Warren counties, which are broken down into 10 divisions by size and location. The school was classified by the NJSIAA as Group IV North for football for 2024–2026, which included schools with 893 to 1,315 students. In the 07–08 school year, Colonia High School introduced three new sports: volleyball (boys and girls), ice hockey and swimming.

The school has operated as the host school / lead agency for a cooperative ice hockey program with John F. Kennedy Memorial High School and Woodbridge High School, under an agreement scheduled to expire at the end of the 2023–24 school year.

The girls' bowling team won the overall state championship in 1981.

The boys' bowling team won the overall state championship in 1984 and won the Group II title in 2012.

Dagmara Wozniak was the state sabre champion in 2005.

The boys' basketball team won the 1985 Central Jersey, Group III Sectional Championship beating Franklin High School 53-51 in the finals. The team won the 2007 North II, Group III state sectional championship, edging Union Hill High School 84–83 in the tournament final. In 2008, the Patriots won 61-57 in the state semifinals against Rahway High School, the seventh-ranked team in the state, before losing 59-39 to Scotch Plains-Fanwood High School in the North II Group III finals to finish their basketball season with a record of 22–7. In 2018, the team won the 2018 North II, Group III state sectional championship, with a 57-33 victory over West Morris Central High School. In 2022, the team won the North II Group III sectional championship, defeating South Plainfield High School by a score of 56-52 in double overtime in the finals. The Patriots finished the season 25-5 and their second sectional title since 2019 in their third straight appearance in the sectional championship. The 2022-23 team finished with record of 22-9 and won their second straight sectional title against Henry Snyder High School in the North II Group III sectional final by a score of 64-51.

In 2015, the football team finished the season with an 11–1 record and went to the North II, Group III state sectional championship before losing to Phillipsburg High School in overtime by a score of 28–21 in the tournament final.

In 2020, John Poznanski won the individual NJSIAA state wrestling championship in the 182-pound weight class.

In the 2021–22 and 2022-23 hockey seasons, the co-op hockey team won the GMC Kolodney Cup championships, marking the school's first Kolodey Cup titles. The 2022-23 team had one of the best seasons the program has ever had, finishing the season with an overall record of 19-1-1, with their only lost coming in the NJSIAA Group C state championship game against Governor Livingston High School that went into quadruple-overtime, the longest high school hockey championship game ever played in New Jersey.

== Publications ==
Colonia High School's official student newspaper is The Declaration.

The Arch is Colonia High School's annual yearbook. In addition to the physical yearbook, the yearbook club has developed an interactive digital yearbook.

== Administration ==
The school's principal is Christopher Chiera. His core administration team includes two vice principals and the athletic director.

== Notable alumni ==
- Antonio Alfano (born 2000), defensive tackle for the Edmonton Elks of the Canadian Football League
- Chad Baker-Mazara (born 2000), basketball player for the USC Trojans
- Jordan Derkack (born 2003), college basketball player for the Rutgers Scarlet Knights men's basketball team
- John Gorka (born 1958), folk musician
- Tom Higgins (born 1954), NFL and Canadian football player and coach
- Jimmy James (born 1959 as James Fyke), musician who performed with Tommy Tutone
- Stewart Krentzman (born 1951, class of 1969), business executive
- Eric LeGrand (born 1990, class of 2008), college football player who suffered a severe spinal injury during a game for the Rutgers Scarlet Knights football team
- Glen Mason (born 1950), sports commentator and football coach
- Jazlyn Moya (born 1997), footballer who plays as a forward for United Women's Soccer club New Jersey Copa FC and the Dominican Republic women's national team
- Zack Rosen (born 1989), basketball player for Maccabi Ashdod in the Israeli Basketball Premier League
- Dagmara Wozniak (born 1988, class of 2006), sabre fencer named to the U.S. Olympic team for the 2008, 2012 and 2016 Summer Olympics
