= Death of Lauren Cho =

2021 disappearance of a Korean American

- 로렌 조
- Born: Lauren Cho; December 20, 1990; South Korea, Kyungpook National University Hospital
- Disappeared: June 28, 2021 (aged 30); Between Morongo Valley, California and Yucca Valley, California, U.S.
- Status: Found deceased
- Body discovered: October 9, 2021; Yucca Valley, California, U.S.
- Education: Westminster Choir College, New Jersey

Lauren "El" Cho (December 20, 1990 – 2021 (between June 28 and October 9)) was last seen on June 28, 2021, in the area between Morongo Valley, California, and Yucca Valley, California, United States. On October 28, 2021, investigators confirmed that the remains found on October 9 on the open desert at Yucca Valley belonged to Cho.

== Background ==
Cho grew up in Hunterdon County, New Jersey. She graduated from Hunterdon Central Regional High School in 2009. She studied music education at Westminster Choir College. Cho went by the nickname "El."

Prior to her disappearance, Cho had quit her job as a high school music teacher over the winter of 2020, and joined her friend, Cody Orell, on a cross-country road trip. She had met Orell on Memorial Day, and joined his trip with the intention of running a food truck at their final destination; Bombay Beach, California. By June 2021, Cho was working as the private chef for an Airbnb property called “The Whole”, owned by Tao Ruspoli, between Yucca Valley and Morongo Valley outside of Joshua Tree National Park.

== Disappearance ==
The housekeeper at the Airbnb where Cho worked claimed that both Cho and Orell had begun drinking early in the day and that Cho and Orell had gotten into an argument when Orell refused to let Cho drive away.

According to Orell, Cho had gotten upset and walked away from the converted bus without her phone, food, or water, when he had gone inside the bus around 3 pm. He called the local sheriff's office around 5:13 pm for additional help after searching with some friends for Cho. The original search party reportedly never found any of Cho's tracks, and responding law enforcement found only the tracks of the search party. This led Orell to believe that Cho got into a vehicle with someone, as she had been planning on meeting an unknown individual later in the week.

When she was last seen, she was walking away from the place where she was staying. She was last seen wearing a yellow T-shirt and jean shorts near Benmar Trail and Hoopa Road, off of California State Route 62.

== Investigation ==
Police and rescue searched the area on foot, including with K9 teams. The area was also searched from the air with fixed wing aircraft. The Morongo Basin Sheriff's station told reporters that the sheriff's helicopter and members of the search and rescue unit were searching for Cho since her disappearance, although they believed she was voluntarily missing, due to no evidence of foul play. The Specialized Investigations division of the San Bernardino County Sheriffs Department, began assisting the Morongo Basin Station in the search for Cho in September 2021.

Orell and other friends attempted to bring awareness to Cho's disappearance using social media to spread her missing poster and hung missing person flyers around Bombay Beach.

On October 9, 2021, investigators found unidentified human remains in the rugged terrain of the open desert of Yucca Valley during their search for Cho. On October 28, 2021, investigators confirmed those remains belonged to Cho. The autopsy listed the cause and manner of death as "undetermined" and "unknown"; toxicology revealed only caffeine and alprazolam.

== Response ==
The lack of media interest in the case led to accusations of bias. The death of Gabby Petito brought about renewed media interest in the disappearance of Cho and other unsolved missing persons cases.

A Facebook page about her disappearance, run by her family, responded to comments made about the similarities between Cho's case and that of Gabby Petito stating, "We realize that on the surface, the public information for both cases share some similarities. We understand the frustration many of you have expressed about how and why certain cases receive national coverage. Ultimately, these two cases are NOT the same and the differences run deeper than what meets the public eye."

== See also ==
- List of solved missing person cases (2020s)
