= National Emotion =

Studio album by Tommy Tutone
- Released: 1983
- Label: Columbia
- Producers: Ed Thacker; Bill Drescher; David Paich; Terry Powell

Tommy Tutone chronology
Tommy Tutone 2 (1981)	National Emotion (1983)	Nervous Love (1996)

National Emotion is an album by the American band Tommy Tutone, released in 1983. The band broke up after its release; it reunited in 1996.

The album peaked at No. 179 on the Billboard 200. It was barely promoted by Columbia Records, due in part to staff turnover. "Get Around Girl" was released as a single.

== Production ==
Members of Toto played on National Emotion. It was intended to be a concept album.

== Critical reception ==
Professional ratings
Review scores
Source	Rating
AllMusic	2.5/5 stars
The Philadelphia Inquirer	4/5 stars

The Philadelphia Inquirer wrote that "Tommy Heath and Jim Keller rough up their heretofore smooth style, but their music is no less ingratiating ... This has always been a band that is simultaneously charming and derivative." The Philadelphia Daily News called the band "one of the best practitioners of West Coast 'skinny tie' pop rock."

The Sun-Sentinel deemed "Get Around Girl" "a punchy rocker full of angry, slicing guitars." The San Francisco Chronicle noted "a swipe of grit, a certain mannerism that comes off as style, not excuse, on a base of writing that contains a germ of interest beyond the four-chord, get-the-girl mentality."

AllMusic wrote that the album "finds the band going through the motions, half-heartedly repeating the formula of Tommy Tutone-2, rocking harder in places but generally lacking inspiration." In 1991, The Palm Beach Post labeled "Get Around Girl" one of the 1980s' "hits-that-should-have-been."

== Track listing ==
Side 1
No.	Title	Writer(s)	Length
1.	"Dumb But Pretty"	Jim Keller; Tommy Heath; B. Dalton	3:34
2.	"Someday Will Come"	Heath; S. LeGassick; M. Holden	3:54
3.	"Laverne"	Keller; D. Gilman
4.	"National Emotion"	Keller; Heath	4:02
5.	"Get Around Girl"	N. Rupar	3:20

Side 2
No.	Title	Writer(s)	Length
1.	"I Believe"	Keller; Greg Sutton; Heath	3:32
2.	"Money Talks"	Heath; T. Britten; S. Shifrin	3:14
3.	"Imaginary Heart"	Heath; Keller	3:02
4.	"Sticks and Stones"	Keller	4:54
5.	"I Wanna Touch Her"	Keller; J. Henderson	3:32
