= 1955 All-Southern Conference football team =

The 1955 All-Southern Conference football team consists of American football players chosen by the Associated Press (AP) and United Press (UP) for the All-Southern Conference football team for the 1955 college football season.

== All-Southern Conference selections ==
=== Backs ===
- Fred Wyant, West Virginia (AP-1)
- Bobby Moss, West Virginia (AP-1)
- Mike Sommer, George Washington (AP-1)
- Frank Pajaczkowski, Richmond (AP-1)
- Tom Theodose, Richmond (AP-2)
- Joe Marconi, West Virginia (AP-2)
- Dick Belton, Davidson (AP-2)
- Dickie Beard, Virginia Tech (AP-2)

=== Ends ===
- Paul Thompson, George Washington (AP-1)
- Walt Brodie, William & Mary (AP-1)
- Grover Jones, Virginia Tech (AP-2)
- Tom Newton, Davidson (AP-2)

=== Tackles ===
- Bruce Bosley, West Virginia (AP-1)
- Bob Lusk, William & Mary (AP-1)
- Sam Huff, West Virginia (AP-2)
- Erik Christensen, Richmond (AP-2)

=== Guards ===
- Gene Lathey, West Virginia (AP-1)
- Jim Locke, Virginia Tech (AP-1)
- Chuck Howley, West Virginia (AP-2)
- Conrad Tuza, The Citadel (AP-2)

=== Centers ===
- Jack Prater, Virginia Tech (AP-1)
- Dick Gaspari, George Washington (AP-2)

== Key ==
AP = Associated Press

== See also ==
- 1955 College Football All-America Team
