= K-Quarantine =

South Korean COVID-19 control strategy

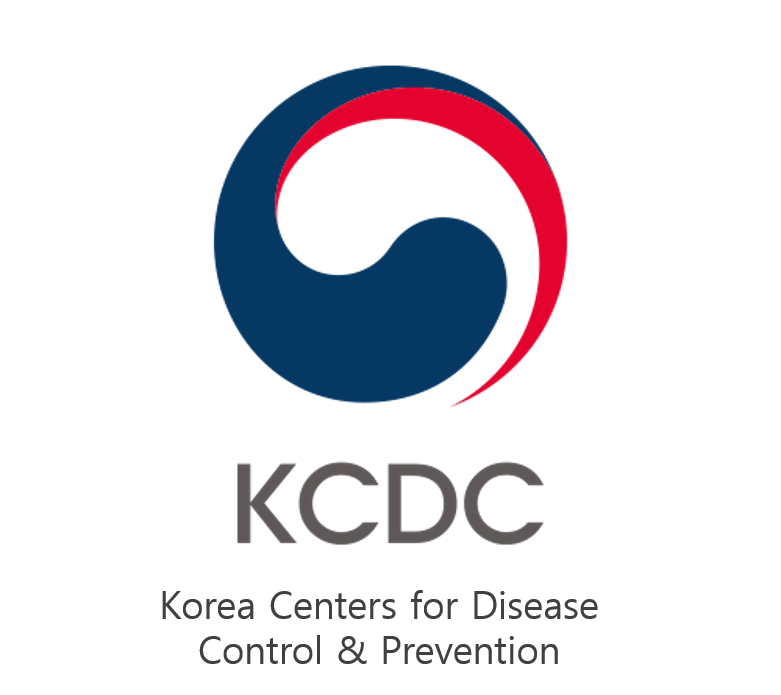
K-Quarantine is conduced by the Korea Centers for Disease Control and Prevention.

Epidemic curve of COVID-19 in South Korea

K-Quarantine (Korean: K-방역; RR: K-bangyeok) is a term introduced in 2020 to describe the strategy used by South Korea during the COVID-19 pandemic to limit the spread of the virus, including a quarantine system, outreach campaigns, testing, and contact tracing. The term "K-Quarantine" was first introduced by the South Korean Ministry of Health and Welfare.

== Initial surge ==
South Korea's first COVID-19 case was confirmed on January 20, 2020: A 35-year-old Chinese woman who had traveled from Wuhan, China, through Incheon International Airport was confirmed positive. The patient was immediately quarantined at Incheon Medical Center, and the city activated its countermeasures, including opening a screening clinic and designating a health official to manage the patient's direct contacts.

By February 24, an outbreak at the Shincheonji Daegu Church caused the government to declare a "severe" crisis stage. By the 27th, South Korea was ranked second in the world for confirmed cases and countries around the world began banning or restricting Korean travelers and instituting travel warnings.

=== Efforts of Korea's Centers for Disease Control and Prevention ===
With support from President Moon Jae-in, the Korea Disease Control and Prevention Agency worked to prevent the spread of the disease, conducting daily briefings and creating a system to track South Korean cases in real time.

== Quarantine ==
South Korea's advanced quarantine system was initially implemented by Prime Minister Goh Kun during the SARS epidemic, when he acted as a "prevention control tower", was re-implemented.

In March 2020, the number of confirmed COVID-19 cases began to decrease and many South Koreans continued to wear masks and remain at home. According to Na Baek-ju, the quarantine control officer at the Seoul Disaster and Safety Countermeasures Headquarters, new cases in Seoul experienced a decrease for several reasons: Careful inspection of travelers into South Korea; general community self-isolation; and social distancing.

By late April, daily case numbers were decreasing. The identification and management of "quarantine blind spots" began in earnest, drawing health department attention to group such as undocumented residents and people experiencing homelessness who would struggle to isolate.

At a speech on the third anniversary of his inauguration, President Moon said "K quarantine has become the world standard. Korea's national stature and national pride have grown more than ever. It is the power of the people who unfortunately demonstrated the dedication of the quarantine authorities and medical staff, the voluntary participation of numerous volunteers, and the spirit of solidarity and cooperation. We have securely defended the quarantine front with the power of the people and have won the war against the virus. As the domestic situation enters the stabilization stage, it has transformed into a new daily life where quarantine and daily life coexist."

However, cases soon began to rise and government efforts to balance economic recovery and virus containment led Moon to declare the quarantine system to be "faced with a crisis." The relaxing of regulations during the summer in an effort to stimulate the economy, as well as increasing anti-government sentiments, led Moon to again ban church gatherings and large outdoor events.

== Outreach campaigns ==
=== Healthcare worker appreciation ===
Medical staff worked around the clock, from overnight to during the holidays. Personal protective equipment, including masks, was a job requirement through the summer. In surveys conducted in October and November, higher than average numbers of healthcare workers were experiencing significant levels of depression. During April and May, expressions of gratitude toward medical staff began online and spread throughout South Korea. The "thank-you challenge" eventually included President Moon Jae-in, BTS, Kim Yu-na, Park Na-rae, Lee Hyo-ri, and other celebrities.

== Testing and tracing ==
=== Drive-through testing ===
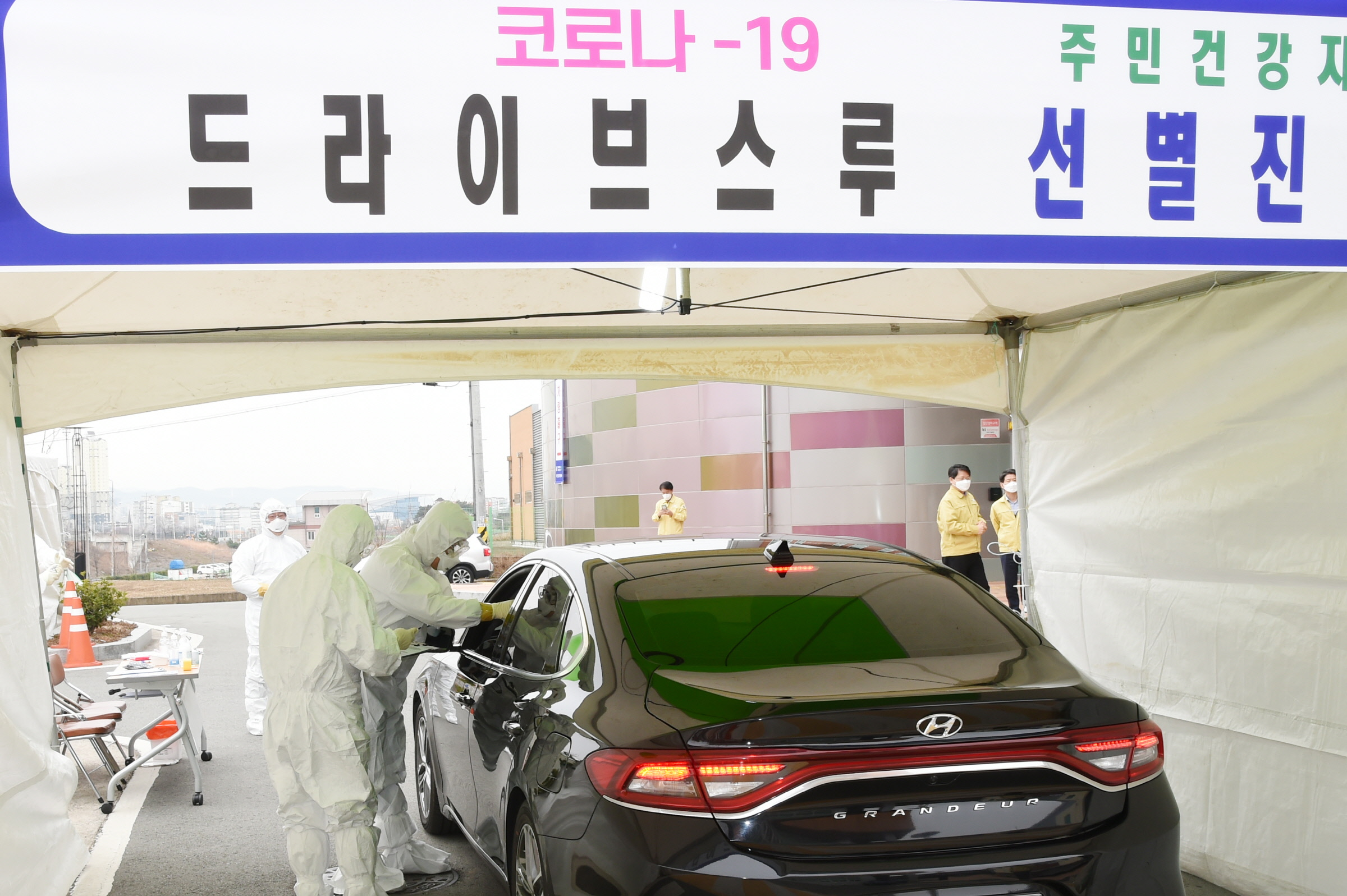
A drive-through testing site in South Korea

On February 23, 2020, South Korea developed the world's first drive-through COVID-19 testing sites, which were initially conceived by Kim Jin-yong, director of Infectious Diseases at Incheon Medical Center, and installed at Chilgok Kyungpook National University Hospital. At a drive-through test site at Daegu Yeungnam University Hospital, staff were able to complete reception, examination, temperature measurement, sample collection from nose and mouth, and disinfection in 5–10 minutes per vehicle.

Drive-through testing expanded to 50 drive-through testing locations in operation.

=== Contact tracing and information disclosure ===
Until May 2020, South Korean health officials used a transparent information disclosure system to make the public aware of outbreaks and potential spread. New confirmed cases would be announced with the individual's age, gender, movement, neighborhood, and even sometimes their last name and occupation. This information disclosure was re-examined after an outbreak in the Itaewon area of Seoul led to doxxing and other privacy invasions for infected individuals.

=== QR code–based vaccine pass ===
Koreans have used the individual's QR code on NAVER or KAKAO app to track the individual who visited indoor spaces without disclosing private information. After Omicron variant spreads, the Korean government announced that the COVID-19 vaccine pass (방역패스) is mandatory to enter indoor spaces, including restaurants, cafes, pubs, etc. Vaccine pass system has expanded to department stores, large retailers, and hagwon in January 2022. Either proof of vaccination on the app or a negative PCR test result is required to enter for most of the multi-use facilities. Over 1,000 lawsuits against the vaccine pass were filed on concerns over discrimination against unvaccinated people. Expanded Vaccine pass is criticized for lacking scientific grounds and fairness. Most of the lawsuits are still underway and written judgment over Vaccine pass suspension varied according to each local court.

== International partnerships ==
=== China ===
South Korea's Foreign Ministry held a videoconference with representatives from China on March 13, 2020, to discuss responses to the SARS-CoV-2/COVID-19 pandemic and modes of potential future cooperation, including "quarantine, exchange of clinical information, supply of quarantine materials, and supporting business activities." As a result, masks were exchanged between Korea and China.

Additionally, the former chairman of Alibaba, a Chinese e-commerce company, donated 1 million masks to Korea.

=== United States ===
Following a phone call between US President Donald Trump and President Moon, South Korea exported 750,000 testing reagents to the US, followed by two test kit shipments totaling 750,000 units. Shipments were also sent directly to Colorado via Congressman Cory Gardner and to Maryland via Governor Larry Hogan. The tests were some of the first to clear the United States Food and Drug Administration's approval process and the first significant shipment of testing kits to be ordered by the US government.

=== Worldwide market ===
As of April 7, 2020, 126 countries had inquired about purchasing diagnostic tests from South Korea.

Korean diagnostic kits have been exported to 106 countries worldwide, including the United States, Colombia, India, Italy, and the United Arab Emirates. The amount sold reached about $156.7 million by April 20, 2020. The Korean government prioritized streamlining the import of the test kit components, hoping that the market for these tests would help improve South Korea's pandemic-impacted economy.

In late April, Deputy Prime Minister and Finance Minister Hong Nam-ki told economic ministers that "In light of the COVID-19 situation, we shall make the best use of the K-quarantine model as an asset to advance economic cooperation, to pioneer new markets and to improve the country's reputation in the international community." The government announced it would pledge $400 million to health projects in developing countries.

== See also ==
- COVID-19 pandemic in South Korea
- Jeong Eun-kyeong
- Moon Jae-in
