= WCVH =

- Flemington, New Jersey; United States
- Frequency: 90.5 MHz

Programming
- Format: Country music
- Affiliations: USA Radio Network

Ownership
- Owner: Hunterdon Central Regional High School Board of Education
- Sister stations: HCTV-27/Comcast Cable

History
- First air date: 1974
- Call sign meaning: W Community Voice of Hunterdon (County)

Technical information
- Licensing authority: FCC
- Facility ID: 28129
- Class: A
- ERP: 78 watts
- HAAT: 137.0 meters
- Transmitter coordinates: 40°33′25.00″N 74°54′18.00″W

Links
- Public license information: Public file; LMS
- Website: Official website

WCVH (90.5 FM) is a radio station broadcasting from Hunterdon Central Regional High School. The station first went on the air in April 1974. The station features country music and specialty programming. Starting in 2007, the station began airing play-by-play for Hunterdon Central Football and Basketball.

From 3:00 PM to 9:00 PM on school nights, the station is run by student DJs who work in pairs of two or three for 2-hour shifts. The shifts are from 3:00 PM to 5:00 PM, 5:00 PM to 7:00 PM, and 7:00 PM to 9:00 PM. The students are able to learn about radio operations while practicing it themselves.
