= 867-5309/Jenny =

1981 single by Tommy Tutone

- US single label

Single by Tommy Tutone

from the album Tommy Tutone 2
- B-side: "Not Say Goodbye"
- Written: 1981
- Released: 1981
- Genre: Power pop; new wave
- Length: 3:45
- Label: Columbia
- Songwriters: Alex Call; Jim Keller
- Producers: Jim Keller; Chuck Plotkin; Tommy Tutone

Tommy Tutone singles chronology
"Angel Say No" (1980)	"867-5309/Jenny" (1981)	"Get Around Girl" (1983)

Audio sample
- file; help

Music video
- "867-5309/Jenny" on YouTube

"867-5309/Jenny" is a song written by Alex Call and Jim Keller and performed by Keller's band Tommy Tutone. It was released on the album Tommy Tutone 2 (1981) through Columbia Records. It peaked at number four on the Billboard Hot 100 and number one on the Rock Top Tracks chart in April 1982.

The song led to a fad of people prank calling unsuspecting victims by dialing 867-5309 and asking for "Jenny".

== Creation ==
According to lead guitarist Jim Keller, interviewed by People in 1982: "Jenny is a regular girl, not a hooker. Friends of mine wrote her name and number on a men's room wall at a bar. I called her on a dare, and we dated for a while. I haven't talked with her since the song became a hit, but I hear she thinks I'm a real jerk for writing it."

The band's lead singer Tommy Heath had a different version of the song's origin, but also with a real girl and number. He claims the number belonged to a girl he knew, and that he wrote it on a bathroom wall in a motel where they were staying, as a joke. "We laughed about it for years," he said.

However, co-writer Alex Call explained his version of the song's origins in a June 2004 interview with Songfacts:

Despite all the mythology to the contrary, I actually just came up with the 'Jenny,' and the telephone number and the music and all that just sitting in my backyard. There was no Jenny. I don't know where the number came from, I was just trying to write a 4-chord rock song and it just kind of came out. This was back in 1981 when I wrote it, and I had at the time a little squirrel-powered 4-track in this industrial yard in California, and I went up there and made a tape of it. I had the guitar lick, I had the name and number, but I didn't know what the song was about. This buddy of mine, Jim Keller, who's the co-writer, was the lead guitar player in Tommy Tutone. He stopped by that afternoon and he said, 'Al, it's a girl's number on a bathroom wall,' and we had a good laugh. I said, 'That's exactly right, that's exactly what it is.'

Tommy Tutone's been using the story for years that there was a Jenny and she ran a recording studio and so forth. It makes a better story but it's not true. That sounds a lot better than I made it up under a plum tree in my backyard.

I had the thing recorded. I had the name and number, and they were in the same spots, 'Jenny... 867-5309.' I had all that going, but I had a blind spot in the creative process, I didn't realize it would be a girl's number on a bathroom wall. When Jim showed up, we wrote the verses in 15 or 20 minutes, they were just obvious. It was just a fun thing, we never thought it would get cut. In fact, even after Tommy Tutone made the record and '867-5309' got on the air, it really didn't have a lot of promotion to begin with, but it was one of those songs that got a lot of requests and stayed on the charts. It was on the charts for 40 weeks.

I've met a few Jennys who've said, "Oh, you're the guy who ruined my high school years." But for the most part, Jennys are happy to have the song.

"There was no Jenny," Call also told a Tampa, Florida, columnist in June 2009. "The number? It came to me out of the ether."

The song's music video alternates band performance footage with a narrative showing Tommy Heath being smitten by a seductive woman who he pursues. The "Jenny" character is played by model Karen Elaine Morton. Keller appears briefly as a psychotherapist to whom Heath describes his fixation with Jenny, before Heath is arrested and imprisoned for voyeurism.

== Popularity and litigation ==
The song, released in 1981, initially gained popularity; many who had the number soon abandoned it because of unwanted calls.

When we'd first get calls at 2 or 3 in the morning, my husband would answer the phone. He can't hear too well. They'd ask for Jenny, and he'd say "Jimmy doesn't live here any more." ... Tommy Tutone was the one who had the record. I'd like to get hold of his neck and choke him.

— Lorene Burns, an Alabama householder formerly at +1-205-867-5309; she changed her number in 1982.

Asking telephone companies to trace the calls was of no use, as Charles and Maurine Shambarger (then in West Akron, Ohio, at +1-216-867-5309) learned when Ohio Bell explained: "We don't know what to make of this. The calls are coming from all over the place." A little over a month later, they disconnected the number and the phone became silent.

In some cases, the number was picked up by commercial businesses and organizations, or acquired for use in radio promotions.

- In 1982, WLS radio obtained the number from a Chicago woman, receiving 22,000 calls in four days.
- In 1982, Southwest Junior High School received up to two hundred calls daily asking for Jenny in area code 704.
- Brown University obtained the +1-401-867 prefix in 1999, assigning 867-5309 to a student dormitory room that was promptly inundated with nuisance calls. The number was subsequently assigned to the Rhode Island company Gem Plumbing & Heating, which registered it as a trademark in 2005.
- A February 2004 auction for the number in a New York City code was shut down by eBay after objections from Verizon; bidding had reached $80,000. The US Federal Communications Commission takes the position that most phone numbers are "public resources" that "are not owned by carriers or their customers" but did not rule out the number being sold as part of a business.
- A subsequent February 2004 auction for the number in area code 800 and 888 listed Jeffrey Steinberg's Philadelphia business JSS Marketing for sale, including both numbers as part of the bundle. This circumvents eBay restrictions, which prevent selling the numbers on their own.
- In 2004, Weehawken, New Jersey, resident Spencer Potter picked up the number for free after discovering to his surprise that it was available in the 201 area code, hoping it would improve his DJ business. Unable to handle the overwhelming volume of calls, he sought to sell the number on eBay in February 2009. Although bids reached $1 million, his inability to confirm the identity of the bidders led him to sell it privately to Retro Fitness, a gym franchise with a location in Secaucus, New Jersey, that felt the 1980s origin of the number tied in with their business's retro theme.
- In 2006, Benjamin Franklin Franchising, a large national plumbing franchise, began using a toll-free version of the number (+1-866-867-5309), which it advertised as "867-5309/Benny". In 2007, Gem Plumbing & Heating brought suit against Clockwork Home Services, the parent company of Benjamin Franklin Franchising, alleging a violation of its trademark. Clockwork contended that Gem's trademark was invalid. Effective in May 2007, Clockwork was ordered by a court to stop using the number in New England. According to Tommy Heath, lead singer of Tommy Tutone: "It's ridiculous. If I wanted to get into it, I could probably take the number away from both of them."
- In 2009, nutrition firm Natrient LLC leased +1-800-867-5309 from 5309 Partners Ltd for $25 million as part of a radio ad campaign.
- In July 2009, Jason Kaplan had +1-267-867-5309 assigned to a Vonage phone line in the name of a small business and then listed the entire business for sale on eBay. The auction closed at $5,500.
- In January 2013, Five309 LLC announced plans to use 855-867-5309 and 888-867-5309 to promote the website JennySearch.com.
- In 2013, Florida realtor Carrie Routt was still receiving fifty prank calls daily at +1-850-867-5309.
- A Fort Collins, Colorado, restaurant, Totally 80's Pizza, uses +1-970-867-5309 as part of its 1980s theme.
- In 2026, the Cancer Support Community and Gilda's Club, co-signed by Tutone, adopted +1 272-867-5309 as the phone number for a cancer support helpline.

=== Bruce Springsteen controversy ===
Singer-songwriter Bruce Springsteen's 2007 single "Radio Nowhere" features a set of guitar riffs at the beginning that many fans considered particularly similar to "867-5309/Jenny", although the lyrics and the tone of the two songs are quite different. Regarding legal action, Heath said, "I think it's close enough that if I wanted to, I could work with it... I don't really get into that sort of thing, but the kids do need braces, so maybe I will." He later clarified that he had no interest in suing and felt "really honored at a similarity, if any".

== Personnel ==
Tommy Tutone

- Tommy Heath – lead vocals, rhythm guitar
- Jim Keller – lead guitar, vocals
- Jon Lyons – bass guitar
- Victor Carberry – drums

Additional musician

- John Cowsill – percussion, harmony vocals

== Charts ==
=== Weekly charts ===
Chart (1982)	Peak position
Australia (Kent Music Report)	22
Canada Top Singles (RPM)	2
New Zealand (Recorded Music NZ)	32
US Billboard Hot 100	4
US Mainstream Rock Airplay (Billboard)	1
US Cash Box Top 100	5

=== Year-end charts ===
Chart (1982)	Rank
Canada Top Singles (RPM)	20
US Billboard Hot 100	16
US Cash Box Top 100	38

== See also ==
- Denial-of-service attack § Telephony denial-of-service
- Fictitious telephone number
- List of Billboard Mainstream Rock number-one songs of the 1980s
