= Jimmy James (musician) =

American songwriter (born 1959)

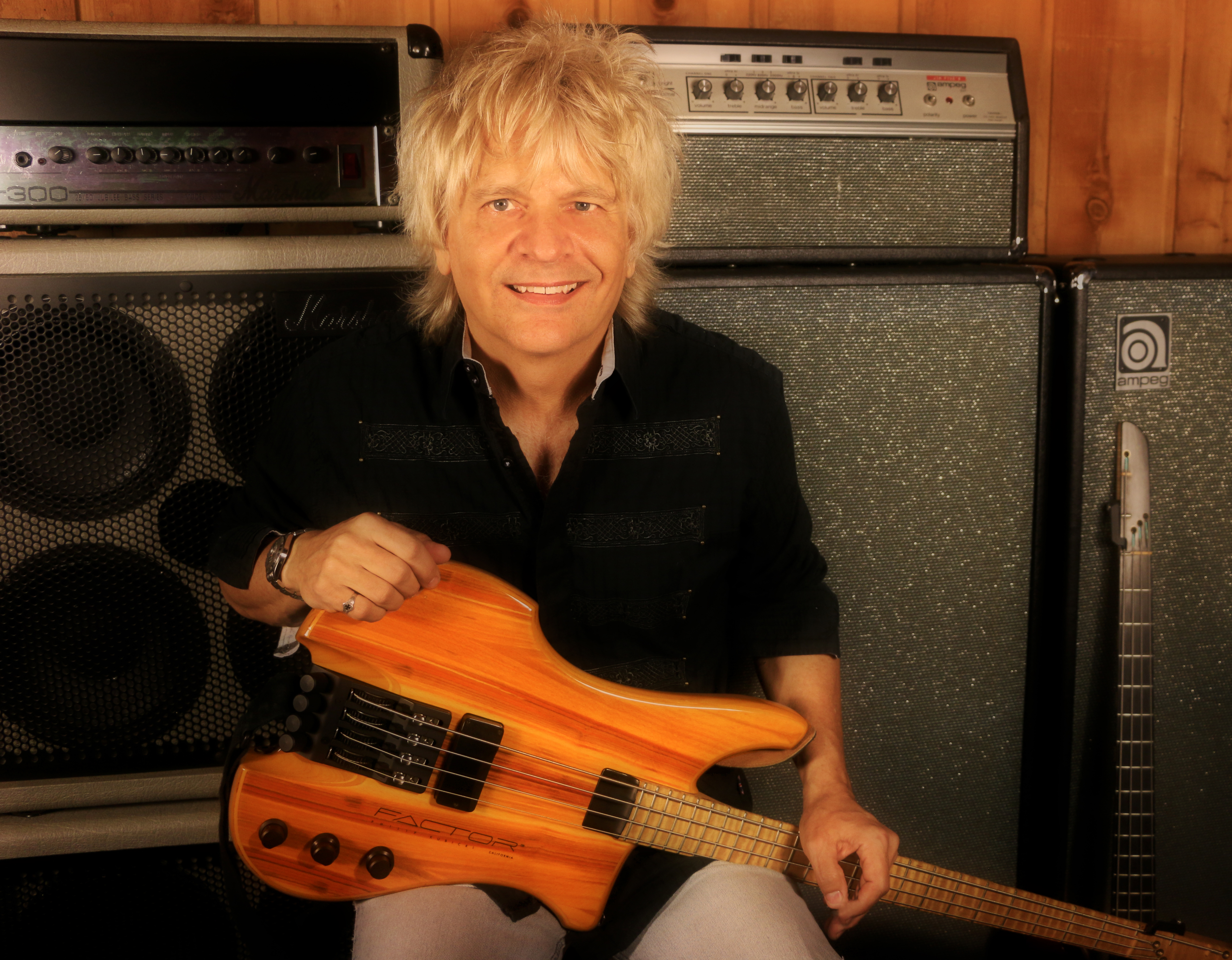

Background information
- Born: James A Fyke; June 27, 1959 (age 67)
- Origin: Colonia, New Jersey, U.S.
- Genres: Rock, power pop
- Occupation: Musician
- Instruments: Vocals, guitar, drums, bass, keyboards
- Years active: 1981–present
- Website: jimmyjames.us

James A. Fyke (born June 27, 1959), better known as Jimmy James, is an American musician. He is a multi instrumentalist and a singer-songwriter.

== Early life, family and education ==
James graduated from Colonia High School in Colonia, New Jersey, and received a bachelor of Music degree from the University of Tampa in 1981. In college, he was president of the honorary music fraternity Kappa Kappa Psi.

== Career ==
James originally played the bass in the rock band of Tommy Tutone, later switching to guitar and drums and performing the role of band leader.

He has played bass with Animotion, keyboards with Mike Tramp (White Lion), and guitar with Bad Company featuring Brian Howe. James has written rock music shows for theme parks such as Busch Gardens, Opryland, Fiesta Texas and for Disney. He has performed with acts that include Fabian, The Coasters, The Marvellettes, and Lou Christie. He has performed solo acoustic guitar throughout Europe, supporting acts such as Kip Winger and Eric Martin (Mr. Big). Additionally, James has had a solo singer-songwriter career.

== Product endorsements ==
James has product endorsements with Orange Amplifiers, Marshall Amplifiers, Ampeg Amplifiers, Gibson Guitars, Kubicki basses, Hammond organs, Rick Turner guitars and Clayton guitar picks.

== Personal life ==
Jimmy James resides in Tampa, Florida.

== Solo albums ==
- All Talk / No Action (1999)
- Solace in the Sun (2015)
- 80's Remaster (2021)

== Collaborations ==
- 80's Hits Stripped (2005)
- Santa I Got Your Number Tommy Tutone (2010)
