= St Rose Music =

- Company type: Music Publishing and Management
- Industry: Music & entertainment
- Founded: 1999
- Headquarters: New York, New York, United States
- Key people: Jim Keller: Director; Philip Glass: Founder
- Number of employees: 10
- Website: strosemusic.com

St. Rose Music is a music management and publishing company representing a select and diverse roster of composers and artists. The company was founded in 1999 by Jim Keller and Philip Glass.

== Current clients ==
- Nico Muhly
- Rufus Wainwright
- Jeff Beal
- Paul Leonard-Morgan
- Ravi Shankar
- Anoushka Shankar
- Rachel Portman
- Tom Waits
