= Kyle Johnson (American football) =

American football player (born 1978)

Kyle D. Johnson
No. 39
- Position: Fullback

Personal information
- Born: December 15, 1978 (age 47); Woodbridge Township, New Jersey, U.S.
- Listed height: 6 ft 0 in (1.83 m)
- Listed weight: 242 lb (110 kg)

Career information
- High school: Woodbridge
- College: Syracuse
- NFL draft: 2002: 5th round, 145th overall pick

Career history
- Carolina Panthers (2002)*; New York Giants (2002)*; Detroit Lions (2002)*; Denver Broncos (2002–2007)
- * Offseason or practice squad member only

Career NFL statistics
- Receptions: 33
- Receiving yards: 323
- Receiving touchdowns: 8
- Rushing attempts: 9
- Rushing yards: 39
- Rushing touchdowns: 1
- Stats at Pro Football Reference

Albert Kyle Johnson (born December 15, 1978) is an American former professional football player who was a fullback in the National Football League (NFL). He was selected by the Carolina Panthers in the fifth round of the 2002 NFL draft. He played college football for the Syracuse Orange.

== Early life ==
As a senior at Woodbridge High School in Woodbridge Township, New Jersey, Johnson won second-team All-State recognition, All-County honors, and All-Area honors.

== College career ==
Johnson played college football at Syracuse University. However, an ankle injury ended his season in the Oranges' opener but still had 20 touchdowns; he was subsequently granted a sixth year of eligibility by the NCAA.

== Professional career ==
=== Carolina Panthers ===
Johnson was selected by the Carolina Panthers as the 10th pick in the 5th round of the 2002 NFL draft. He was cut by the team on September 1, 2002.

=== New York Giants ===
Johnson was signed to the practice squad of the New York Giants on September 3, 2002. He was released on October 23, 2002.

=== Detroit Lions ===
Johnson was signed to the practice squad of the Detroit Lions on November 13, 2002.

=== Denver Broncos ===
Johnson was signed to the Denver Broncos' active roster off of the Lions' practice squad on December 10, 2002, but was inactive for the remainder of the season and spent the next year being shuffled between the active roster and the practice squad. He began 2004 with the Broncos as a backup and special teams player; however, injuries led to starting fullback Reuben Droughns being moved to tailback, leaving the fullback spot to Johnson. However, after three starts, he suffered a season-ending injury to his right ankle. Thereafter, Johnson was the starting fullback for the next several years serving as a valuable run blocker and pass catcher within the Mike Shanahan offense. During the 2006 regular season with the Denver Broncos, Johnson scored a career-high 6 touchdowns (5 catching and 1 rushing). His touchdowns often ended in his signature "Bucking Bronco" celebration dance.

On September 1, 2007, Johnson was cut from the Denver Broncos. He re-signed with the Broncos on November 22, 2007, when guard Isaac Snell was cut to make room for Johnson due to the injuries of Travis Henry, Selvin Young and Paul Smith. He was cut again on November 27, 2007.
