= Woodbridge High School (New Jersey) =

High school in Middlesex County, New Jersey, United States

Location
- 1 Samuel Lupo Place; Woodbridge Township, Middlesex County, New Jersey 07095; United States; 40.566448°N 74.284695°W

Information
- Type: Public high school
- Established: 1956
- School district: Woodbridge Township School District
- NCES School ID: 341812003672
- Principal: Scott Osborne
- Faculty: 129.6 FTEs
- Grades: 9-12
- Enrollment: 1,654 (as of 2023–24)
- Student to teacher ratio: 12.8:1
- Colors: Red and Black
- Athletics conference: Greater Middlesex Conference (general); Big Central Football Conference (football)
- Team name: Barrons
- Accreditation: Middle States Association of Colleges and Schools
- Newspaper: Barron Perspective
- Yearbook: Baronet
- Website: www.woodbridge.k12.nj.us/o/whs

Woodbridge High School is a four-year comprehensive public high school located in Woodbridge Township, in Middlesex County, New Jersey, United States, serving students in ninth through twelfth grades as part of the Woodbridge Township School District. The high school is one of three in the district, together with Colonia High School and John F. Kennedy Memorial High School. The school is accredited until July 2025 and has been accredited by the Middle States Association of Colleges and Schools Commission on Elementary and Secondary Schools since 1928.

As of the 2023–24 school year, the school had an enrollment of 1,654 students and 129.6 classroom teachers (on an FTE basis), for a student–teacher ratio of 12.8:1. There were 596 students (36.0% of enrollment) eligible for free lunch and 201 (12.2% of students) eligible for reduced-cost lunch.

== History ==
The township's first school building was constructed in 1876 on School Street in Woodbridge Proper and was designated Public School No. 1 (PS 1). Built at a cost of $25,000, The school opened in January 1877, and high school classes were initially held there. The clock, bell, and bell tower have since been removed, along with other renovations that have been done to the building. The bell now resides at Parker Press Park. The building now serves as the headquarters of the Woodbridge Board of Education. The first high school graduation took place in 1883, with two graduates.

In 1948, a football field and stadium were built on the site of the former Woodbridge Speedway, a wooden auto racetrack. The facility was dedicated as "The Stadium" and later renamed "Nick Priscoe Field" in the 1970s in honor of a football coach Nick Prisco.

The original Woodbridge High School building opened in 1911 at Barron and Grove Avenues, and was replaced in 1956 by a building constructed adjacent to a new football stadium, at which time the former high school building was repurposed as Woodbridge Middle School. The previous stadium, known as Legion Field, was vacated to make way for the southbound lanes of the New Jersey Turnpike. Even with the new building, rapid growth in the township meant that the high school held split sessions until 1964, with freshmen and sophomores attending in the afternoon, and juniors and seniors in the morning.

The 1956 high school construction included what was then Kelly Street, later renamed Samuel Lupo Place in the 1980s in recognition of another former football coach. The class of 1956, consisting of 317 students, was the last to graduate from the Barron Avenue building.

== Governance ==
The school's principal is Scott Osborne. His core administration team includes the three vice principals.

== Athletics ==
The Woodbridge High School Barrons compete in the Greater Middlesex Conference, which includes public and private schools in Middlesex County, and operates under the supervision of the New Jersey State Interscholastic Athletic Association (NJSIAA). With 1,052 students in grades 10–12, the school was classified by the NJSIAA as Group III for the 2019–20 school year, covering schools with enrollments between 761 and 1,058 students.

The football team competes in Division 4 of the Big Central Football Conference, which includes 60 schools from Hunterdon, Middlesex, Somerset, Union, and Warren counties. For 2024–2026, the NJSIAA classified the team as Group IV North for football, which includes schools with 893 to 1,315 students.

Woodbridge and John F. Kennedy Memorial High School participate in a cooperative ice hockey program with Colonia High School as the host school, under an agreement scheduled to end after the 2023–24 school year.

The football team has won nine state championships—1930, 1938, 1939, 1960, 1970, and 1971 prior to the playoff era, and the NJSIAA Central Jersey Group IV sectional titles in 1980, 1993, and 1997.

The boys' basketball team won the NJSIAA Group IV state championship in 1975, finishing 29–2 after defeating Eastside Paterson 73–58 in the title game.

The school's boys' and girls' bowling teams have combined for 15 state championships. The boys' team won overall titles in 1981, 1983, and 1992, and Group III championships in 2007, 2011, 2012, 2018, and 2019, along with Tournament of Champions titles in 2012 and 2018. The girls' team won overall titles in 1989, 1993, 1998, 1999, 2001, and 2006, and the Group III and Tournament of Champions titles in 2007. The 2001 team won the state championship with 2,653 pins, five ahead of Central Regional High School.

The softball team won the Group IV state title in 1978, defeating Westfield High School, and was runner-up in 1979 against Ridgewood High School.

The boys' shuttle hurdle relay team won the Group IV state title in 1995 with a time of 31.27 seconds.

== Awards and recognition ==
The school was the 159th-ranked public high school in New Jersey out of 339 schools statewide in New Jersey Monthly magazine's September 2014 cover story on the state's "Top Public High Schools", using a new ranking methodology. The school had been ranked 170th in the state of 328 schools in 2012, after being ranked 229th in 2010 out of 322 schools listed. The magazine ranked the school 231st in 2008 out of 316 schools. The school was ranked 222nd in the magazine's September 2006 issue, which surveyed 316 schools across the state. Schooldigger.com ranked the school tied for 40th out of 381 public high schools statewide in its 2011 rankings (a decrease of 14 positions from the 2010 ranking) which were based on the combined percentage of students classified as proficient or above proficient on the mathematics (93.8%) and language arts literacy (97.3%) components of the High School Proficiency Assessment (HSPA).

== Notable alumni ==
- Percy Edgar Brown, (1885–1937), soil scientist at Iowa State University, best known for the book, Soils of Iowa
- Erik Christensen (born 1931), wide receiver who played for the Washington Redskins. Christensen attended Woodbridge High School before transferring to Fork Union Military Academy.
- Lou Creekmur (born 1927), offensive lineman (eight Pro Bowl appearances) with the Detroit Lions, inducted into the Pro Football Hall of Fame in 1996
- Libell Duran, Miss New Jersey USA 2013
- Edward M. Hundert (born 1957), medical ethicist.
- Jack H. Jacobs (born 1945, class of 1962), Medal of Honor Recipient, awarded 1969
- Kyle Johnson (born 1978, class of 1996), fullback with the Denver Broncos
- Michael Jones (born 1987), actor and internet personality
- Pat Lamberti (1937–2007), American football linebacker who played for the New York Titans and Denver Broncos in 1961
- Praise Martin-Oguike (born 1993), American football defensive end who played in the XFL for the Seattle Dragons
- Harding Peterson (1929–2019), professional baseball player and general manager
- Jack Protz (born 1948), American football linebacker who played for the San Diego Chargers in 1970
- Dawn Marie Psaltis (born 1970), former female professional wrestler and WWE Diva
- Richie Sambora (born 1959), former lead guitarist of the rock band Bon Jovi who was honored by having the street leading to the school named "Richie Sambora Way"
- Tommy Thompson (1927-1990), American football linebacker and center who played for the Cleveland Browns in the All-America Football Conference and the NFL in the late 1940s and early 1950s

== Notable staff ==
- Nick Prisco (1909–1981), former NFL player who was the head football coach
