= Woodbridge Township School District =

School district in Middlesex County, New Jersey, US

Address
- School Street Woodbridge Township, Middlesex County, New Jersey, 08863; United States
- Coordinates: 40.55521°N 74.280274°W

District information
- Grades: PreK-12
- Superintendent: Joseph Massimino
- Business administrator: Brian Wolferman
- Schools: 24

Students and staff
- Enrollment: 13,982 (as of 2023–24)
- Faculty: 1,197
- Student–teacher ratio: 12:1

Other information
- District Factor Group: DE
- Website: www.woodbridge.k12.nj.us
| Ind. | Per pupil | District spending | Rank (*) | K-12 average | %± vs. average |
|---|---|---|---|---|---|
| 1A | Total Spending | $15,989 | 14 | $18,891 | −15.4% |
| 1 | Budgetary Cost | 12,959 | 23 | 14,783 | −12.3% |
| 2 | Classroom Instruction | 8,186 | 28 | 8,763 | −6.6% |
| 6 | Support Services | 1,859 | 24 | 2,392 | −22.3% |
| 8 | Administrative Cost | 1,453 | 52 | 1,485 | −2.2% |
| 10 | Operations & Maintenance | 1,143 | 8 | 1,783 | −35.9% |
| 13 | Extracurricular Activities | 206 | 35 | 268 | −23.1% |
| 16 | Median Teacher Salary | 69,270 | 76 | 64,043 |
Data from NJDoE 2014 Taxpayers' Guide to Education Spending. *Of K-12 districts with more than 3,500 students. Lowest spending=1; Highest=103

The Woodbridge Township School District is a comprehensive community public school district that serves students in pre-kindergarten through twelfth grade from Woodbridge Township in Middlesex County, in the U.S. state of New Jersey. All schools are accredited by the Middle States Association of Colleges and Schools.

As of the 2023-24 school year, the district, comprising 24 schools, had an enrollment of 13,982 students and 1,197 classroom teachers, for a student–teacher ratio of 12:1. The high schools offer more than 150 courses, including Advanced Placement, college preparatory, business, vocational and cooperative work/study programs.

== History ==
Voters approved a referendum in March 2020 that would raise $87 million for renovations that would include the replacement of the 100-year-old Avenel Street School and the closure of Ford Avenue School, whose students would be shifted to Lafayette Estates School.

The district had been classified by the New Jersey Department of Education as being in District Factor Group "DE", the fifth-highest of eight groupings. District Factor Groups organize districts statewide to allow comparison by common socioeconomic characteristics of the local districts. From lowest socioeconomic status to highest, the categories are A, B, CD, DE, FG, GH, I and J.

== Awards and recognition ==
During the 2008-09 school year, Kennedy Park School #24 was recognized with the Blue Ribbon School Award of Excellence by the United States Department of Education, the highest award an American school can receive. Lynn Crest School was recognized as a "Blue Ribbon" School during the 2009-10 school year. In 2023, Claremont Avenue Elementary School was one of nine schools in New Jersey that was recognized as a National Blue Ribbon School.

For the 2005-06 school year, the district was recognized with the "Best Practices Award" by the New Jersey Department of Education for its "Blooming Buddies-The Garden Club" Science program at Matthew Jago Elementary School.

For the 2004-05 school year, Matthew Jago Elementary School was named a "Star School" by the New Jersey Department of Education, the highest honor that a New Jersey school can achieve.

== Schools ==
Schools in the district (with 2022–23 enrollment data from the National Center for Education Statistics) are:

Elementary schools

- Mawbey Street School #1 (350; K-5 - built 1962)
- Avenel Street School #4&5 (427; K-5 - #4 built 1912, #5 built 1948)
- Port Reading School #9 (361; K-5 - built 1962)
- Ross Street School #11 (564; K-5 - Original built 1920, renovated 2019)
- Indiana Avenue School #18 (445; K-5 - built 1955)
- Menlo Park Terrace #19 (360; K-5 - built 1958)
- Claremont Avenue School #20 (319; K-5 - built 1958)
- Oak Ridge Heights School #21 (276; K-5 - built 1959)
- Lynn Crest School #22 (316; K-5 - built 1959)
- Woodbine Avenue School #23 (401; K-5 - built 1960)
- Kennedy Park School #24 (263; PreK-5 - built 1960)
- Lafayette Estates School #25 (410; K-5 - built 1960)
- Robert Mascenik School #26 (321; K-5 - built 1960)
- Pennsylvania Avenue School #27 (402; K-5 - built 1964)
- Matthew Jago School #28 (411; K-5 - built 1969)
- Oak Tree Road School #29 (425; K-5 - built 1952, opened 2018)

Middle schools

- Avenel Middle School (587; 6-8)
  - Thomas Leusen, principal
- Colonia Middle School (560; 6-8)
  - Joseph Short, principal
- Fords Middle School (593; 6-8) opened on January 18, 1960
  - Jennifer Murphy, principal
- Iselin Middle School (849; 6-8)
  - Kelly Cilento, principal
- Woodbridge Middle School (517; 6-8)
  - Jamison Panko, principal

High schools

- Colonia High School (1,356; 9-12)
  - Christopher Chiera, principal
- John F. Kennedy Memorial High School (1,371; 9-12)
  - James Parry, principal
- Reaching Individual Student Excellence (RISE) (NA; 9-12)
- Woodbridge High School (1,558; 9-12)
  - Scott Osborne, principal

== Administration ==
Core members of the district's administration are:

- Joseph Massimino, superintendent
- Brian Wolferman, business administrator and board secretary

== Board of education ==
The district's board of education, comprised of nine members, sets policy and oversees the fiscal and educational operation of the district through its administration. As a Type II school district, the board's trustees are elected directly by voters to serve three-year terms of office on a staggered basis, with three seats up for election each year held (since 2012) as part of the November general election. The board appoints a superintendent to oversee the district's day-to-day operations and a business administrator to supervise the business functions of the district.

=== Controversy ===
Lois Rotella, former assistant superintendent of curriculum and instruction, left her position in early August 2012. After her departure, "the district has been notoriously tight-lipped about matters since various schools have been under investigation by the State Board of Education's Office of Fiscal Accountability and Compliance... because of a high number of wrong-to-right erasures on the New Jersey Assessment of Skills and Knowledge (NJASK) standardized tests."

In 2015, it was found out that Ford Avenue School #14 principal Cathie Bedosky was encouraging students to cheat on the NJASK standardized test. She also poorly trained test proctors, and hired unqualified people to administer the test. She was later suspended by vote at the Woodbridge Board of Education.
