= Erik Christensen (American football) =

American football player (1931–2022)

No. 72, 61
- Position: Defensive end

Personal information
- Born: October 31, 1931; Elizabeth, New Jersey, U.S.
- Died: March 18, 2022 (aged 90); Newark, Delaware, U.S.
- Listed height: 6 ft 3 in (1.91 m)
- Listed weight: 235 lb (107 kg)

Career information
- High school: Woodbridge (NJ); Fork Union Military Academy (VA)
- College: Richmond
- NFL draft: 1955: 7th round, 76th overall pick

Career history
- Washington Redskins (1956); Calgary Stampeders (1956-1957)

Career NFL statistics
- Games played: 2
- Stats at Pro Football Reference

Erik Robert Christensen Jr. (October 31, 1931 – March 18, 2022) was an American professional football defensive end who played professionally for the National Football League (NFL) for the Washington Redskins. He played college football at the University of Richmond and was selected 76th overall in the seventh round of the 1955 NFL draft.

Christensen played high school football at Woodbridge High School in Woodbridge Township, New Jersey, before transferring to Fork Union Military Academy.

Christensen died on March 18, 2022, at the age of 90.
