= John F. Kennedy Memorial High School (New Jersey) =

High school in Middlesex County, New Jersey, United States

Location
- 200 Washington Avenue; Iselin, Middlesex County, New Jersey 08830; United States; 40.57311°N 74.306177°W

Information
- Type: Public high school
- Established: 1964
- School district: Woodbridge Township School District
- NCES School ID: 341812003670
- Principal: James Parry
- Faculty: 114.0 FTEs
- Grades: 9-12
- Enrollment: 1,370 (as of 2025–26)
- Student to teacher ratio: 12.02:1
- Colors: Dartmouth Green; White
- Athletics conference: Greater Middlesex Conference (general); Big Central Football Conference (football)
- Team name: Mustangs
- Rival: Colonia High School
- Accreditation: Middle States Association of Colleges and Schools
- Newspaper: The Torch
- Yearbook: Camelot
- Website: www.woodbridge.k12.nj.us/o/jfk

John F. Kennedy Memorial High School (J.F.K.) is one of three four-year comprehensive public high schools that serve students in ninth through twelfth grades from Woodbridge Township in Middlesex County, in the U.S. state of New Jersey, operating as part of the Woodbridge Township School District. The other two high schools in the district are Colonia High School and Woodbridge High School. The school has been accredited by the Middle States Association of Colleges and Schools Commission on Elementary and Secondary Schools since 1968 and expires in July 2033.; In Fall 2018, the school's accreditation status was extended for seven years.

J.F.K., like the other two high schools in the district, uses block scheduling, instead of having eight periods a day.

As of the 2025–26 school year, the school had an enrollment of 1,370 students and 114.0 classroom teachers (on an FTE basis), for a student–teacher ratio of approx. 12.02:1. There were 532 students (38.8% of enrollment) eligible for free lunch and 119 (8.7% of students) eligible for reduced-cost lunch.

== History ==
Originally intended to be named Iselin High School, the school was constructed in time for the 1964–65 school year to alleviate overcrowding in the district's two existing high schools that had 5,600 students in double sessions during the 1962–63 school year. After President John F. Kennedy was assassinated, the Board of Education voted to change the name of the school from Iselin High School to John F. Kennedy Memorial High School at their meeting on November 26, 1963. The school opened in September 1964.

== Awards, recognition and rankings ==
The school was the 129th-ranked public high school in New Jersey out of 339 schools statewide in New Jersey Monthly magazine's September 2014 cover story on the state's "Top Public High Schools", using a new ranking methodology. The school had been ranked 132nd in the state of 328 schools in 2012, after being ranked 146th in 2010 out of 322 schools listed. The magazine ranked the school 171st in 2008 out of 316 schools. The school was ranked 142nd in the magazine's September 2006 issue, which surveyed 316 schools across the state. Schooldigger.com ranked the school 63rd out of 381 public high schools statewide in its 2011 rankings (a decrease of 5 positions from the 2010 ranking) which were based on the combined percentage of students classified as proficient or above proficient on the mathematics (91.2%) and language arts literacy (96.4%) components of the High School Proficiency Assessment (HSPA). In 2023–24, it ranked 146 out of all high schools in the state and first among the schools in the district. It has a graduation rate of 94% with a diverse student body (46.8% Asian, 26.5% Hispanic, 17.9% White, 7.7% African-American).

== Athletics ==
The John F. Kennedy Memorial High School Mustangs compete in the Greater Middlesex Conference, which is comprised of public and private high schools located in the greater Middlesex County area, operating under the supervision of the New Jersey State Interscholastic Athletic Association (NJSIAA). With 1,008 students in grades 10-12, the school was classified by the NJSIAA for the 2019–20 school year as Group III for most athletic competition purposes, which included schools with an enrollment of 761 to 1,058 students in that grade range. The football team competes in Division 5D of the Big Central Football Conference, which includes 60 public and private high schools in Hunterdon, Middlesex, Somerset, Union and Warren counties, which are broken down into 10 divisions by size and location. The school was classified by the NJSIAA as Group IV North for football for 2024–2026, which included schools with 893 to 1,315 students.

Together with Woodbridge High School, the school has participated in a cooperative ice hockey program with Colonia High School as the host school / lead agency, under an agreement scheduled to expire at the end of the 2023–24 school year.

The 1978 football team finished the season with an 8-3 record after winning the Central Jersey Group III state sectional title by defeating North Hunterdon High School by a score of 23-6 in a game in which the team's kicker tied a state record for successful field goals.

The softball team won the Group III state championship in 1988, defeating runner-up Ramsey High School in the tournament finals.

The 2009 boys' baseball team finished the season with a 24-4 record after defeating Shawnee High School by a score of 5-2 in the tournament final to win the Group III state championship, which is the only group state title in the program's history.

The boys' soccer team won the 2005 Central Jersey Group II state sectional championship with a victory over Roselle Park High School, the first soccer state title in the school's history, and earning Ed Bobal honors from the Home News Tribune as its coach of the year.

The softball team won the 2007 North II Group III state sectional championship with a 2–1 win over South Plainfield High School. The team repeated as the 2008 North II Group III state sectional champions with a 5–0 win in the tournament final over crosstown rival Colonia High School.

== Administration ==
The school's principal is James Parry. His administration team includes two vice principals.

== Notable alumni ==
- Dina Hashem (class of 2007), stand-up comedian, voice actress and writer
- Michele Ross (born 1982, class of 2008), neuroscientist and media personality
- Robert Stone (born 1983), professional wrestler and manager with WWE, who has appeared on their NXT brand
- Tico Torres (born 1953), drummer and percussionist for rock band Bon Jovi
- Joe F. Vitale (born 1954), New Jersey State Senator and interim mayor of Woodbridge Township
