= Tommy Tutone =

American rock/power pop band

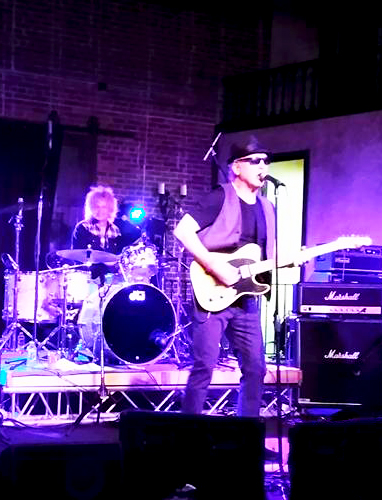
- Tommy Tutone in 2017

Background information
- Origin: California, U.S.
- Genres: Power pop; pop rock; new wave
- Years active: 1978–1984; 1996–present
- Labels: Columbia; CBS Records; Spectra Records
- Members: Tommy Heath; Jimmy James; Greg Georgeson; Christy Lichtenstein
- Past members: Jerry Angel; Victor Carberry; Pete Costello; John Cowsill; Mona Gnader; Jim Keller; Joe Lamond; Michael Traylor; Jon Lyons; Terry Nails; Mickey Shine; Greg Sutton; Steve Fister; Kerry Movassagh; Garfield Redden; Andy Gauthier; John Herrington
- Website: tutone.com

Tommy Tutone is an American rock/power pop band, known for its 1981 song "867-5309/Jenny", which peaked at number four on the Billboard Hot 100. The band's lead singer and rhythm guitarist is Tommy Heath. Heath grew up in Philadelphia, Texas, and Montana before moving to San Francisco during the Summer of Love to become a hippie. There, he formed the band with Jim Keller and Terry Nails in 1978, naming it after his nickname. The band's first single, "Angel Say No", was released in 1980 and reached the top 40, and they opened for Tom Petty and the Heartbreakers on his US tour for Damn the Torpedoes.

The band's second album, Tommy Tutone 2, was released in 1981 and featured "867-5309/Jenny". The song became so popular it inspired a nationwide fad for prank calls to the telephone number. In 2006, VH1 named it the 36th-greatest song of the 1980s.

== History ==
Tommy Heath and Jim Keller founded the band in 1978 along with bassist Terry Nails, with Heath acting as the lead vocalist and rhythm guitarist. Keller played lead guitar and Nails played bass and provided supporting vocals. Heath and Keller were the only constant members of Tommy Tutone, while the lineup featured a rotating membership of bassists and drummers.

Bassist Jon Lyons, who performed on "867-5309/Jenny", replaced founding member Terry Nails, but was soon himself replaced by Greg Sutton, Pete Costello, and in 1988 Jimmy James. Mona Gnader, the bassist in Sammy Hagar's The Waboritas band, played with the band as well. Original drummer Kenny Johnson (of Chris Isaak's band) was replaced by Mickey Shine (Clover and the first Elvis Costello album), then Victor Carberry for the band's second album, and later Jerry Angel. John Cowsill of The Cowsills played percussion (and sang) on "867-5309/Jenny".

From 2001 to 2010, the band consisted of Heath, Jimmy James, guitarist Greg Georgeson, and drummer Andy Gauthier. In 2007, the band signed a recording contract with Spectra Records. By 2012, Tommy Heath had become a computer analyst and software engineer and moved to Portland, Oregon.

In 2017, with the addition of Steve Fister (Steppenwolf, Lita Ford) on guitar, Jimmy James switched to drums and the band released the single "My Little Red Book".

Jim Keller went on to become the director of Philip Glass's publishing company, Dunvagen Music Publishers. He still performs in New York City.

In 2019, the band released their first studio album since 1998, Beautiful Ending.

The band is still touring in 2026.

== Discography ==
=== Studio albums ===
Year	Album details	Peak chart positions	
Year	Album details	US	CAN
1980	Tommy Tutone: Release date: February 17, 1980; Label: Columbia/CBS Records	68	82
1981	Tommy Tutone 2: Release date: September 23, 1981; Label: Columbia/CBS Records	20	44
1983	National Emotion: Release date: April 16, 1983; Label: Columbia/CBS Records	179	—
1996	Nervous Love: Release date: January 22, 1996; Label: Appaloosa Records; Note: re-released in 2011 as A Long Time Ago	—	—
1998	Tutone.rtf: Release date: July 28, 1998; Label: Secret Disc Records	—	—
2007	The Singles: Release date: November 4, 2007; Label: Spectra Records	—	—
2019	Beautiful Ending: Release date: May 9, 2019; Label: One Music Group	—	—
"—" denotes releases that did not chart

=== Singles ===
Year	Single	Peak chart positions					Certifications (sales threshold)	Album
Year	Single	US	US Main	CAN	AUS	NZ	Certifications (sales threshold)	Album
1980	"Angel Say No"	38	—	—	—	—		Tommy Tutone
1980	"Cheap Date"	—	—	—	—	—		Tommy Tutone
1980	"Girl in the Back Seat"	—	—	—	—	—		Tommy Tutone
1981	"867-5309/Jenny"	4	1	2	22	32	US: Gold	Tommy Tutone 2
1982	"Which Man Are You"	—	—	—	—	—		Tommy Tutone 2
1983	"Get Around Girl"	—	—	—	—	—		National Emotion
2009	"Santa I Got Your Number"	—	—	—	—	—		Non-album singles
2017	"My Little Red Book"	—	—	—	—	—		Non-album singles
2018	"Time Won't Let Me"	—	—	—	—	—		Non-album singles
2018	"When You Walk in the Room "	—	—	—	—	—		Non-album singles
"—" denotes releases that did not chart
