= Kyungpook National University Hospital =

Hospital in Daegu, South Korea

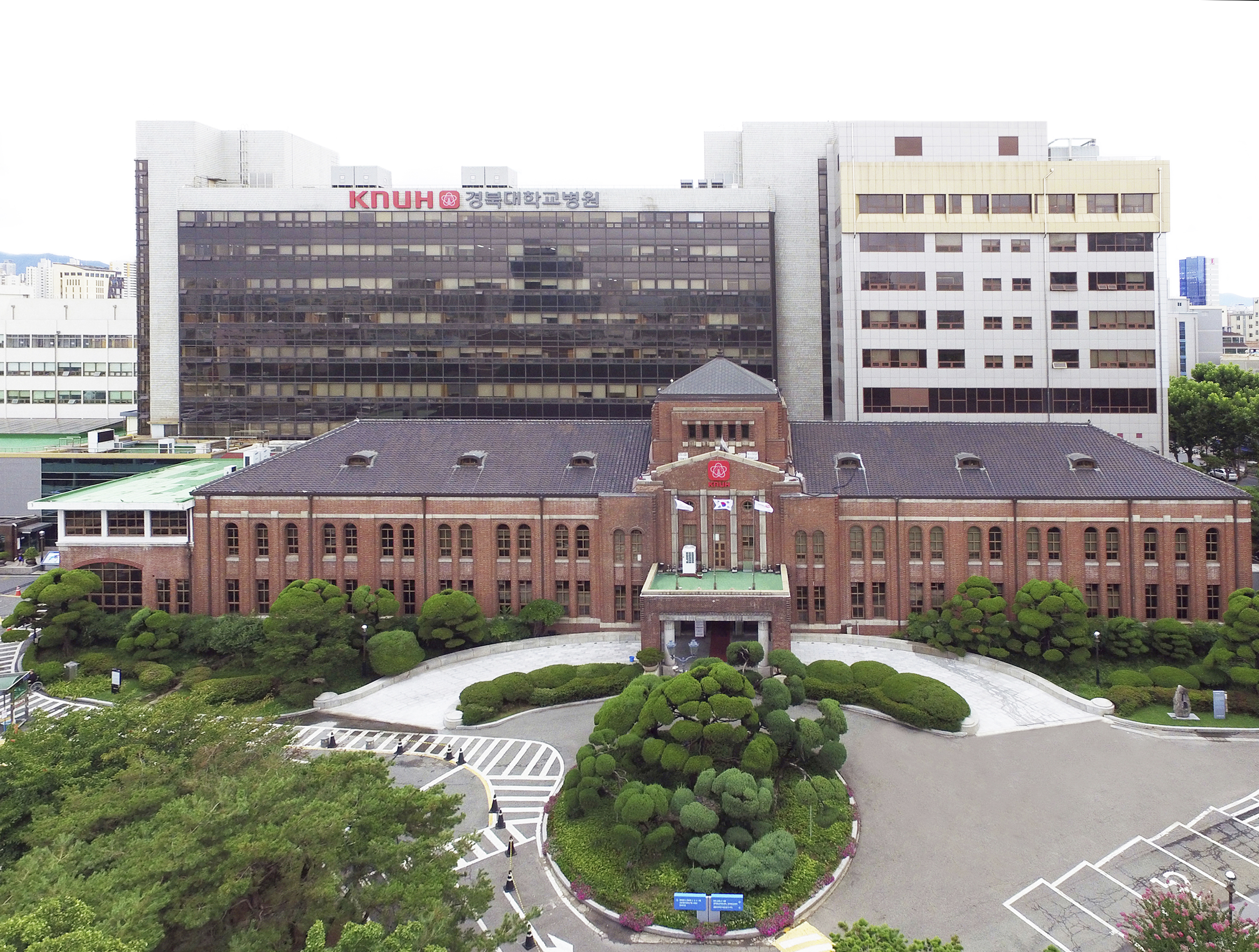

Geography
- Location: Daegu, South Korea
- Coordinates: 35°51′58.97″N 128°36′15.33″E

History
- Opened: 1907; 119 years ago

Links

Korean name
- Hangul: 경북대학교병원
- Hanja: 慶北大學校病院
- RR: Gyeongbuk daehakgyo byeongwon
- MR: Kyŏngbuk taehakkyo pyŏngwŏn

Kyungpook National University Hospital (Korean: 경북대학교병원) is located in Daegu, South Korea. It was derived from the DongIn Clinic which opened in 1908. It is the central hospital of Gyeongsangbuk-do. In 1952 Kyungpook National University was established, followed by the creation of the Kyungpook National University Hospital.

The hospital director is Yong-Lim Kim.

Former hospital president Chung Ho-young was nominated to the position of Minister of Health and Welfare in Yoon Suk-yeol's cabinet, but withdrew his nomination due to allegations of abuses of power. The second nomination for the position, former president Kim Seung-hee, also withdrew her nomination, due to allegations of misappropriating government funds.
