= Jim Keller =

American guitarist

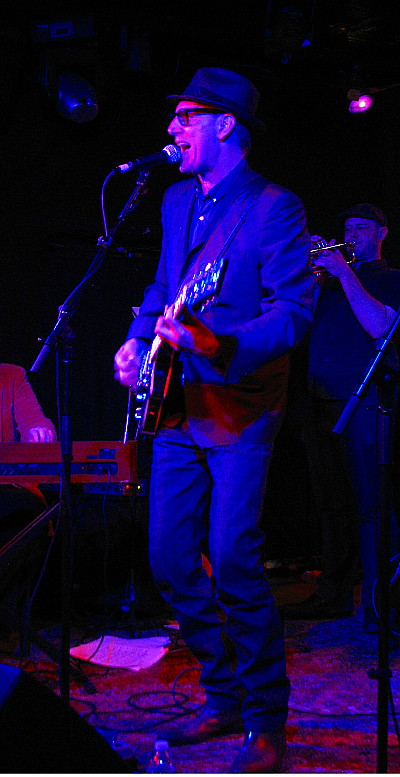
- Jim Keller in 2012

Background information
- Born
- Genres: Blues, pop, alternative rock
- Occupations: Songwriter, musician, music publisher, music manager
- Instruments: Vocals, guitar
- Years active: 1978–present
- Labels: Elisha James Music, Orange Mountain Music
- Website: jimkellermusic.com

Jim Keller is an American musician, producer, manager, publisher, and composer whose work in the music business spans more than 40 years. He was the co-founder, lead guitarist, and primary songwriter for the American rock band Tommy Tutone based in San Francisco, California, and was co-writer of that band's most famous single, 867-5309/Jenny. Since 1992, Keller has worked with Philip Glass, first running Glass's publishing company and eventually managing his career as director of Dunvagen Music. In 1999, Keller founded St. Rose Music as a publishing and management company for friends and associates. Their roster has grown to include Nico Muhly, Rachel Portman, Angélica Negrón, the music theater works of Tom Waits, Jeff Beal, Paul Leonard-Morgan, Ravi Shankar, and Anoushka Shankar.

== Career ==
In 1978, Keller and Tommy Heath began playing around the greater San Francisco area with a variety of backup musicians under the billing Tommy Tutone. By 1979, Heath and Keller were invited to play a label showcase that brought the attention of the Warner Bros. record label. They entered the studio with bassist Terry Nails and drummer Micky Shine to record the band's first album, Tommy Tutone. Three singles were released including Angel Say No which peaked at No. 38 on the Billboard Hot 100 Charts. In early 1981, the band had begun recording their second LP, when Keller approached Heath with a song he had co-written with former Clover frontman Alex Call. Neither expected that the song would become a hit. In 1982, the song was number 4 on the Billboard charts for 27 weeks. After the band's third album, National Emotion, failed to produce a hit single, they went their separate ways. For several years, Keller played in bands, wrote jingles, and helped friends and colleagues with music publishing.

Keller stopped performing and recording in 1994. A project around that time had led him to calling Philip Glass's office. When he called a second time the person he had been speaking with had left the company. He asked if they were looking to replace him which landed Keller an interview. Glass recalled in The New Yorker, "he had none of the conventional qualifications that I thought someone should have. I asked, ‘What do you know about the music business?,’ and he said, ‘Only what I learned on the street,’ but that’s how I learned, so it didn’t sound bad to me. He said, ‘What did you pay the last guy?,’ and I told him, and he said, ‘I’ll come and work for you for that, and, if I double your income in the first year, you’ll double my salary.’ I thought about that for about thirty seconds, and I realized, That could be great for me, and he did it.”

After a ten-year hiatus, Keller began writing songs and performing again in 2005. He has recorded three solo albums since he left Tommy Tutone, including Sunshine in my Pocket (2009), Soul Candy (2011), and Heaven Can Wait (2014). His most recent album, produced by Mitchell Froom, was released in February 2021. The record, titled "By No Means," features Los Lobos' David Hidalgo on guitar, Bob Glaub on bass, and Michael Urbano on drums. Of the record, Jim Beviglia of American Songwriter writes that "it’s Keller’s songwriting, wry and understated, yet always gently stirring, that holds center court." Jon Freeman and Joseph Hudak of Rolling Stone, discussing the album's second single "Mistakes," write "Mixing Dr. John’s New Orleans shuffle with the eerie openness of Kiko-era Lobos, it’s a shadowy environment perfect for surveying one’s psychic damage and trying to purge a few demons."

Jim continues to play regularly with the Jim Keller Band.
