= Stewart Krentzman =

- Born: 1951 (age 74–75)
- Occupations: Educator; Business executive
- Employer(s): Unilever; Oki Electric

Stewart Krentzman (born 1951) is an American educator and business executive who serves as an adjunct professor at the New York University Stern School of Business in the executive, full and part-time graduate business programs in New York and Washington D.C., teaching the Marketing Planning and Strategy and the Digital Marketing Strategy in Practice courses. Previously, he served as the president and chief executive officer of Oki Data Americas, Inc. with responsibility for North and South America. He was a member of the board of directors of Oki Data Corporation from 2003 to 2010.

== Early life and education ==
Krentzman was born in 1951. He earned a BA in psychology from Fairleigh Dickinson University in 1973 and an MA in human resources from The New School in 1977.

== Career ==
Krentzman began his career at Unilever, where he served in various sales and marketing roles, including director of marketing for Unilever's flagship brand Lipton tea during the Tetley and Snapple tea wars. He was previously director of marketing for condiments and snack brands, including Wish-Bone salad dressings and helped create and then managed the fruit snack segment, including Sunkist, Nintendo, Disney, and Warner Bros brands. He also developed the national sales strategy for Equal, a sugar substitute.

In 1997, Krentzman joined Oki Data Americas, Inc., a 1200-employee division of $3B Tokyo-based Oki Electric LTD., an imaging and biometric company in Mount Laurel, New Jersey as the vice president of the inkjet printers division. In 2001, he became the senior vice president of sales and marketing and a year later he was appointed as the chief operating officer of the company. From 2003 until 2010, Krentzman was the president and chief executive officer of the company. He was named to the "Top 100 Most Influential People in Technology" in 2009 by CRN Magazine. He served as a board director of Oki Data Corporation in Tokyo, Japan.

Later in his career, Krentzman developed an expansion strategy for the healthcare segment at the Jay Monahan Center for Gastrointestinal Health at New York Presbyterian Hospital - Weill Cornell Medical Center. Additionally, he worked on a project exploring implementing a concierge medicine model in the United Arab Emirates.

Since 2009, Krentzman has been the president of The BBQ Cleaner, LLC in Hackensack, New Jersey, with 317 locations across the United States and Canada.

In 2017, Krentzman and his wife co-founded the New Jersey Friends of Memorial Sloan Kettering. In October 2023, they established Survival+ for Schools, Inc., a non-profit organization focused on addressing school violence.

In September 2025, they will launch https://ClassNeighbors.com, an innovative AI tool designed for elementary school teachers to non-invasively monitor student interactions, thereby helping to provide a safe learning environment for all students.

== Board memberships ==
Krentzman has been a member of the Board of Trustees at Fairleigh Dickinson University since 2008. From 2018 - 2024 he was a member of Advisory Council of Studio Samuel, an organization that creates pathways for girls in Ethiopia In 1999, Krentzman was elected into the Bergen County Boys Soccer Coaches Association Hall of Fame for his service to youth soccer, having served as the President of the Northern Counties Soccer Association, a league comprised of 80+ youth soccer clubs with over 1000 teams and as a director of the NJ State Youth Soccer Association from 1997-1999.
