= Tommy Heath =

American singer

- Born: Thomas Allen Heath; Peoria, Illinois, U.S.
- Genre: Rock music
- Occupation: Musician; Computer analyst
- Instruments: Vocals; Guitar; Keyboard
- Years active: 1978–present
- Website: www.mr8675309.com

Thomas Allan Heath is an American musician best known as the lead singer, rhythm guitarist, and occasional keyboardist of the band Tommy Tutone, who are most famous for their 1981 single, "867-5309/Jenny." A common misconception is that "Tommy Tutone" is Heath's stage name, rather than the name of the band. The band was originally known as "Tommy and the Tu-tones", which was shortened to "Tommy Tutone". Heath left the band after the release of their third album, 1983's National Emotion. In 1994, Heath released the album Nervous Love under the Tommy Tutone name, but without the involvement of any of the other original band members. The band is back on tour in 2024 with a new studio album planned for release in the fall.

Heath has said of the enduring popularity of "867-5309/Jenny" overshadowing the band's other output, "I'm proud to be a one-hit wonder. I'd rather be a three-hit wonder, but it's better than being a no-hit wonder."

Heath later became a computer analyst and software engineer and moved to Portland, Oregon. He married his girlfriend, Lisa Scholtz, on June 9, 2008 while on vacation in Lake Tahoe, California. Heath was diagnosed with 'minor' skin cancer prior to March 2026.
