= 1973 Green Bay Packers season =

NFL team season

- Head coach: Dan Devine
- Home stadium: Lambeau Field; Milwaukee County Stadium

Results
- Record: 5–7–2
- Division place: 3rd NFC Central
- Playoffs: Did not qualify

The 1973 Green Bay Packers season was their 55th season overall and their 53rd season in the National Football League. The defending division champions posted a 5–7–2 record under third-year head coach Dan Devine, earning them a third-place finish in the NFC Central division.

To date, the 1973 Packers along with the Kansas City Chiefs, Cleveland Browns, and Denver Broncos are the last teams to record 2 ties in a single season. Overtime for regular season games was introduced the following year, and the occurrence of tie games decreased.

== Offseason ==
Pro Football Hall of Fame linebacker Ray Nitschke retired during training camp in late August. Bart Starr left as quarterbacks coach to other business interests, which included a network broadcasting position with CBS.

=== NFL draft ===
1973 Green Bay Packers draft
Round	Pick	Player	Position	College	Notes
1	21	Barry Smith	Wide receiver	Florida State	
3	74	Tom MacLeod	Linebacker	Minnesota	
6	152	Tom Toner	Linebacker	Idaho State	
7	177	John Muller	Tackle	Iowa	
8	202	Hise Austin	Cornerback	Prairie View A&M	
9	230	Rick Brown	Linebacker	Iowa	
10	255	Larry Allen	Linebacker	Illinois	
11	280	Phil Engle	Defensive tackle	South Dakota State	
12	308	Larry McCarren *	Center	Illinois	
13	333	Tim Alderson	Defensive back	Minnesota	
14	358	James Anderson	Defensive tackle	Northwestern	
15	386	Reggie Echols	Wide receiver	UCLA	
16	411	Keith Pretty	Tight end	Western Michigan	
17	436	Harold Sampson	Defensive tackle	Southern	
Made roster * Made at least one Pro Bowl during career

=== Undrafted free agents ===
1973 undrafted free agents of note
Player	Position	College
James Bulger	Quarterback	Notre Dame
Steve Hammitt	Center	Nevada

== Roster ==
1973 Green Bay Packers roster
Quarterbacks (QB): 12 Jim Del Gaizo; 17 Jerry Tagge; Running backs (RB): 42 John Brockington; 25 Les Goodman; 30 Larry Krause; 36 MacArthur Lane; 31 Perry Williams; Wide receivers (WR): 46 Leland Glass; 80 Barry Smith; 22 Jon Staggers; 85 Paul Staroba P; 37 Ike Thomas CB; Tight ends (TE): 86 Mike Donohoe; 81 Rich McGeorge	Offensive linemen (OL): 57 Ken Bowman C; 71 Kent Branstetter T; 68 Gale Gillingham G; 72 Dick Himes T; 62 Bill Lueck G; 54 Larry McCarren C; 67 Malcolm Snider T; 58 Cal Withrow C; Defensive linemen (DL): 74 Aaron Brown DE; 78 Bob Brown DT; 76 Mike McCoy DT; 75 Dave Pureifory DE; 87 Alden Roche DE; 83 Clarence Williams DE	Linebackers (LB): 53 Fred Carr OLB; 50 Jim Carter MLB; 51 Larry Hefner MLB; 55 Noel Jenke OLB; 59 Tom Toner OLB; Defensive backs (DB): 27 Hise Austin CB; 48 Ken Ellis CB; 21 Charlie Hall CB/FS; 39 Jim Hill FS; 29 Al Matthews SS; 45 Perry Smith CB; Special teams (ST): 13 Chester Marcol K	Practice squad: 7 Dick Gordon WR; 16 Scott Hunter QB; 24 Ron McBride RB; 11 Charlie Napper QB; 70 Lee Nystrom G; Reserve: 28 Willie Buchanon CB (IR); 77 Bill Hayhoe T (IR); 44 Bob Kroll CB (IR); 56 Tom MacLeod LB (IR); 73 Carleton Oats DT (IR); 20 Ron Widby P (IR); 65 Keith Wortman G (IR); Rookies in italics

== Regular season ==
=== Schedule ===
Week	Date	Opponent	Result	Record	Venue	Attendance
1	September 17	New York Jets	**W** 23–7	1–0	Milwaukee County Stadium	47,124
2	September 23	**Detroit Lions**	**T** 13–13	1–0–1	Lambeau Field	55,495
3	September 30	at **Minnesota Vikings**	**L** 3–11	1–1–1	Metropolitan Stadium	48,176
4	October 7	at New York Giants	**W** 16–14	2–1–1	Yale Bowl	70,050
5	October 14	Kansas City Chiefs	**T** 10–10	2–1–2	Milwaukee County Stadium	46,583
6	October 21	at Los Angeles Rams	**L** 7–24	2–2–2	Los Angeles Memorial Coliseum	80,558
7	October 28	at **Detroit Lions**	**L** 0–34	2–3–2	Tiger Stadium	43,616
8	November 4	**Chicago Bears**	**L** 17–31	2–4–2	Lambeau Field	56,267
9	November 11	St. Louis Cardinals	**W** 25–21	3–4–2	Lambeau Field	52,922
10	November 18	at New England Patriots	**L** 24–33	3–5–2	Schaefer Stadium	60,525
11	November 26	at San Francisco 49ers	**L** 6–20	3–6–2	Candlestick Park	49,244
12	December 2	New Orleans Saints	**W** 30–10	4–6–2	Milwaukee County Stadium	46,092
13	December 8	**Minnesota Vikings**	**L** 7–31	4–7–2	Lambeau Field	53,830
14	December 16	at **Chicago Bears**	**W** 21–0	5–7–2	Soldier Field	29,157

Monday (September 17, November 26), Saturday (December 8)

Note: Intra-division opponents are in bold text.

=== Game summaries ===
==== Week 1 ====
Team	1	2	3	4	Total
Jets	0	0	0	7	7
• Packers	3	10	3	7	23

- Date: September 17
- Location: Milwaukee County Stadium, Milwaukee, Wisconsin
- Game start: 8:00 p.m.
- Game weather: 54 °F (12 °C), wind 16 mph (26 km/h)
- TV announcers (ABC): Howard Cosell, Frank Gifford & Don Meredith.

Scoring summary
1	GB	Chester Marcol 9-yard field goal	Packers 3–0
2	GB	Rich McGeorge 19-yard pass from Scott Hunter (Chester Marcol kick)	Packers 10–0
2	GB	Chester Marcol 37-yard field goal	Packers 13–0
3	GB	Chester Marcol 10-yard field goal	Packers 16–0
4	GB	John Brockington 1-yard run (Chester Marcol kick)	Packers 23–0
4	NYJ	David Knight 17-yard pass from Al Woodall (Bobby Howfield kick)	Packers 23–7

==== Week 4 ====
Team	1	2	3	4	Total
• Packers	7	0	6	3	16
Giants	7	0	0	7	14

- Date: October 7
- Location: Yale Bowl, New Haven, Connecticut
- Game start: 1:00 p.m.
- Game weather: 58 °F (14 °C), wind 5 mph (8.0 km/h)

Scoring summary
1	NYG	Don Herrmann 17-yard pass from Norm Snead (Pete Gogolak kick)	Giants 7–0
1	GB	Jon Staggers 20-yard run (Chester Marcol kick)	Tie 7–7
3	GB	Chester Marcol 20-yard field goal	Packers 10–7
3	GB	Chester Marcol 11-yard field goal	Packers 13–7
4	NYG	Bob Grim 10-yard pass from Norm Snead (Pete Gogolak kick)	Giants 14–13
4	GB	Chester Marcol 32-yard field goal	Packers 16–14

==== Week 9 ====
Team	1	2	3	4	Total
Cardinals	7	0	0	14	21
• Packers	10	12	0	3	25

- Date: November 11
- Location: Lambeau Field, Green Bay, Wisconsin
- Game start: 1:00 p.m.
- Game weather: 34 °F (1 °C), wind 12 mph (19 km/h)

Scoring summary
1	GB	John Brockington 1-yard run (Chester Marcol kick)	Packers 7–0
1	GB	Chester Marcol 12-yard field goal	Packers 10–0
1	STL	Donny Anderson 30-yard pass from Jim Hart (Jim Bakken kick)	Packers 10–7
2	GB	Jerry Tagge 1-yard run (kick failed)	Packers 16–7
2	GB	Chester Marcol 32-yard field goal	Packers 19–7
2	GB	Chester Marcol 24-yard field goal	Packers 22–7
4	STL	Ahmad Rashad 23-yard pass from Jim Hart (Jim Bakken kick)	Packers 22–14
4	STL	Terry Metcalf 2-yard run (Jim Bakken kick)	Packers 22–21
4	GB	Chester Marcol 9-yard field goal	Packers 25–21

==== Week 12 ====
Team	1	2	3	4	Total
Saints	0	3	7	0	10
• Packers	3	10	7	10	30

- Date: December 2
- Location: Lambeau Field, Green Bay, Wisconsin
- Game start: 1:00 p.m.
- Game weather: 36 °F (2 °C), wind 12 mph (19 km/h)

Scoring summary
1	GB	Chester Marcol 14-yard field goal	Packers 3–0
2	GB	Al Matthews 58-yard interception return (Chester Marcol kick)	Packers 10–0
2	GB	Chester Marcol 39-yard field goal	Packers 13–0
2	NO	Bill McClard 22-yard field goal	Packers 13–3
3	NO	Jubilee Dunbar 29-yard pass from Archie Manning (Bill McClard kick)	Packers 13–10
3	GB	Jerry Tagge 41-yard run (Chester Marcol kick)	Packers 20–10
4	GB	Jim Carter 42-yard interception return (Chester Marcol kick)	Packers 27–10
4	GB	Chester Marcol 33-yard field goal	Packers 30–10

==== Week 14 ====
Team	1	2	3	4	Total
• Packers	7	7	0	7	21
Bears	0	0	0	0	0

- Date: December 16
- Location: Soldier Field, Chicago
- Game start: 1:00 p.m.
- Game weather: 24 °F (−4 °C), wind 13 mph (21 km/h)

Scoring summary
1	GB	Jon Staggers 20-yard pass from Jerry Tagge (Chester Marcol kick)	Packers 7–0
2	GB	Les Goodman 3-yard run (Chester Marcol kick)	Packers 14–0
4	GB	Jon Staggers 36-yard pass from Jerry Tagge (Chester Marcol kick)	Packers 21–0

=== Standings ===
NFC Central
	W	L	T	PCT	DIV	CONF	PF	PA	STK
Minnesota Vikings	12	2	0	.857	6–0	10–1	296	168	W2
Detroit Lions	6	7	1	.464	3–2–1	6–4–1	271	247	L1
Green Bay Packers	5	7	2	.429	1–4–1	4–6–1	202	259	W1
Chicago Bears	3	11	0	.214	1–5	1–9	195	334	L6
