= 1972 Green Bay Packers season =

NFL team season

- Head coach: Dan Devine
- Home stadium: Lambeau Field; Milwaukee County Stadium

Results
- Record: 10–4
- Division place: 1st NFC Central
- Playoffs: Lost Divisional Playoffs (at Redskins) 3–16

The 1972 Green Bay Packers season was their 54th season overall and their 52nd season in the National Football League. This for first time since 1955 Bart Starr was not on the opening day roster. The team finished with a 10–4 record under second-year head coach Dan Devine, earning them the NFC Central division title. The Packers returned to the playoffs after a four-year drought (and qualified for the first time since Vince Lombardi departed as head coach); their most recent division title was in 1967, completing that postseason with a decisive win in Super Bowl II in January 1968.

In 1972, Green Bay entered the penultimate regular season game at Minnesota on December 10 with an 8–4 record. The Vikings (7–5) had won the season's earlier game at Lambeau Field in Green Bay by breaking a fourth quarter tie with two interceptions for touchdowns. This time, the Packers overcame a 7–0 halftime deficit at Metropolitan Stadium with 23 unanswered points to clinch the division title. Running back John Brockington became the first in NFL history to rush for 1,000 yards in each of his first two seasons, and did it again the following season.

Placekicker Chester Marcol established an NFL rookie record for field goals in a season (since broken). It was the fifteenth and final season of hall of fame linebacker Ray Nitschke.

The Packers' next playoff appearance would come in 1982, however their last playoff appearance in a full season came in 1993, and their next division title came 23 years later, in 1995.

== Offseason ==
In February 1972, running back (and punter) Donny Anderson was traded to the St. Louis Cardinals for MacArthur Lane. Hall of Fame quarterback Bart Starr retired as a player in July; he was the quarterbacks coach and play caller in 1972. (He then pursued business interests and was a color analyst for CBS, then returned to the Packers as their head coach in the 1975 season.)

=== NFL draft ===
1972 Green Bay Packers draft
Round	Pick	Player	Position	College	Notes
1	7	Willie Buchanon *	Cornerback	San Diego State	
1	11	Jerry Tagge	Quarterback	Nebraska	From San Diego
2	34	Chester Marcol *	Kicker	Hillsdale	
4	86	Eric Patton	Linebacker	Notre Dame	
6	138	Nathaniel Ross	Cornerback	Bethune-Cookman	
6	147	Bob Hudson	Running back	Northeastern State	
7	163	Bill Bushong	Defensive tackle	Kentucky	
8	190	Leland Glass	Wide receiver	Oregon	
10	242	Keith Wortman	Guard	Nebraska	
11	266	David Bailey	Wide receiver	Alabama	
12	294	Mike Rich	Running Back	Florida	
13	319	Jesse Lakes	Running Back	Central Michigan	
14	346	Larry Hefner	Linebacker	Clemson	
15	371	Rick Thone	Wide receiver	Arkansas Tech	
16	398	Charles Burrell	Defensive Tackle	Arkansas AM&N	
Made roster * Made at least one Pro Bowl during career

=== Undrafted free agents ===
1972 undrafted free agents of note
Player	Position	College
Bob Kroll	Safety	Northern Michigan
Bill Johanningmeier	Defensive end	Colorado State

== Roster ==
1972 Green Bay Packers roster
Quarterbacks: 16 Scott Hunter; 17 Jerry Tagge; Running backs: 42 John Brockington; 23 Bob Hudson; 40 David Kopay; 36 MacArthur Lane; 31 Perry Williams; Wide receivers: 84 Carroll Dale; 47 Dave Davis; 41 Paul Gibson; 46 Leland Glass; 22 Jon Staggers; Tight ends: 88 Len Garrett; 86 Pete Lammons	Offensive linemen: 57 Ken Bowman C; 77 Bill Hayhoe T; 72 Dick Himes T; 64 Kevin Hunt T; 62 Bill Lueck G; 71 Francis Peay T; 67 Malcolm Snider T; 58 Cal Withrow C; 65 Keith Wortman G; Defensive linemen: 78 Bob Brown DT; 76 Mike McCoy DT; 75 Dave Pureifory DE; 87 Alden Roche DE; 73 Vernon Vanoy DT; 83 Clarence Williams DE	Linebackers: 53 Fred Carr OLB; 50 Jim Carter OLB; 56 Tommy Joe Crutcher OLB; 51 Larry Hefner OLB; 66 Ray Nitschke MLB; 89 Dave Robinson OLB; Defensive backs: 28 Willie Buchanon CB; 48 Ken Ellis CB; 21 Charlie Hall CB/S; 39 Jim Hill FS; 44 Bob Kroll FS; 29 Al Matthews SS; 37 Ike Thomas CB; Special teams: 13 Chester Marcol K; 20 Ron Widby P	Reserve lists: 68 Gale Gillingham DT (IR); 30 Larry Krause RB (IR); 81 Rich McGeorge TE (IR); 10 Frank Patrick QB (IR); Practice squad: 11 Charlie Napper QB; 11 Charlie Pittman RB; 26 Ward Walsh RB

== Regular season ==
=== Schedule ===
In week 3, the Packers defeated the defending Super Bowl champion Dallas Cowboys in Milwaukee, improving their all-time record to 7–1 over Dallas; the sole loss was in 1970.

Week	Date	Opponent	Result	Record	Venue	Attendance
1	September 17	at Cleveland Browns	**W** 26–10	1–0	Cleveland Stadium	75,771
2	September 24	Oakland Raiders	**L** 14–20	1–1	Lambeau Field	56,263
3	October 1	Dallas Cowboys	**W** 16–13	2–1	Milwaukee County Stadium	47,103
4	October 8	**Chicago Bears**	**W** 20–17	3–1	Lambeau Field	56,263
5	October 16	at **Detroit Lions**	**W** 24–23	4–1	Tiger Stadium	54,418
6	October 22	Atlanta Falcons	**L** 9–10	4–2	Milwaukee County Stadium	47,967
7	October 29	**Minnesota Vikings**	**L** 13–27	4–3	Lambeau Field	56,263
8	November 5	San Francisco 49ers	**W** 34–24	5–3	Milwaukee County Stadium	47,897
9	November 12	at **Chicago Bears**	**W** 23–17	6–3	Soldier Field	55,701
10	November 19	at Houston Oilers	**W** 23–10	7–3	Astrodome	41,752
11	November 26	at Washington Redskins	**L** 16–21	7–4	RFK Stadium	53,039
12	December 3	**Detroit Lions**	**W** 33–7	8–4	Lambeau Field	56,263
13	December 10	at **Minnesota Vikings**	**W** 23–7	9–4	Metropolitan Stadium	49,784
14	December 17	at New Orleans Saints	**W** 30–20	10–4	Tulane Stadium	65,881

Monday (October 16)

Note: Intra-division opponents are in bold text.

=== Playoffs ===
Green Bay met the NFC East champion Washington Redskins (11–3) in the divisional playoffs on Christmas Eve at RFK Stadium. The Packers practiced the week before at Wake Forest University in Winston-Salem, North Carolina. The two teams had played four weeks earlier at the same venue; the Redskins won by five points on November 26, and were favored by in the playoff game by 4½ points. The results were similar, as Green Bay scored first but lost again in D.C., this time by thirteen points, 16–3.

Week	Date	Opponent	Result	Record	Venue	Attendance
Divisional	December 24	at Washington Redskins	**L** 3–16	0–1	RFK Stadium	53,140

=== Standings ===
NFC Central
	W	L	T	PCT	DIV	CONF	PF	PA	STK
Green Bay Packers	10	4	0	.714	5–1	8–3	304	226	W3
Detroit Lions	8	5	1	.607	2–4	6–5	339	290	W1
Minnesota Vikings	7	7	0	.500	4–2	6–5	301	252	L2
Chicago Bears	4	9	1	.321	1–5	3–7–1	225	275	L1

== Awards, records, and honors ==
- Chester Marcol, NFL rookie record (since broken), most Field Goals in one year by a rookie, (32)
- Willie Buchanon – AP Defensive Rookie of the Year
