= 1970 Green Bay Packers season =

NFL team season

- Head coach: Phil Bengtson
- Home stadium: Lambeau Field; Milwaukee County Stadium

Results
- Record: 6–8
- Division place: 3rd NFC Central
- Playoffs: Did not qualify

The 1970 Green Bay Packers season was their 52nd season overall and their 50th season in the National Football League. The team finished with a 6–8 record earning them a third consecutive third-place finish in the four-team NFC Central division. It was the third and final season for Phil Bengtson as head coach; he resigned shortly after the season ended.

== Offseason ==
The Packers' 1970 season began in a state of mourning. After a summer in and out of Georgetown Hospital, Vince Lombardi succumbed to cancer on September 3, at the age of 57. Over 3,500 people attended Lombardi's funeral in New York City, including pallbearers Bart Starr, Paul Hornung, and Willie Davis. Three days after his funeral, NFL commissioner Pete Rozelle announced that the Super Bowl trophy would be renamed in Lombardi's honor.

=== NFL draft ===
In the 1970 NFL draft, the Packers used their two picks in the first-round to choose Mike McCoy and Rich McGeorge. The first pick was obtained from the Chicago Bears in a January trade that sent Lee Roy Caffey and Elijah Pitts to Chicago. In total, the Packers selected 20 players in the draft, nine of those being in the first seven rounds.

1970 Green Bay Packers draft
Round	Pick	Player	Position	College	Notes
1	2	Mike McCoy	Defensive tackle	Notre Dame	
1	16	Rich McGeorge	Tight end	Elon	
2	41	Al Matthews	Safety	Texas A&I	
3	68	Jim Carter *	Linebacker	Minnesota	
4	93	Ken Ellis *	Cornerback	Southern	
4	96	Skip Butler	Kicker	Texas–Arlington	
5	120	Cecil Pryor	Defensive end	Michigan	
6	145	Ervin Hunt	Cornerback	Fresno State	
7	172	Cleo Walker	Linebacker	Louisville	
8	197	Tim Mjos	Running back	North Dakota State	
9	224	Bob Reinhard	Guard	Stanford	
10	248	Russ Melby	Defensive tackle	Weber State	
10	251	Frank Patrick	Quarterback	Nebraska	
11	276	Dan Hook	Linebacker	Humboldt State	
12	301	Frank Foreman	Wide receiver	Michigan State	
13	328	Dave Smith	Running back	Utah	
14	353	Bob Lints	Guard	Eastern Michigan	
15	380	Mike Carter	Wide receiver	Sacramento State	
16	405	Jim Heacock	Defensive back	Muskingum	
17	432	Larry Krause	Running back	St. Norbert	
Made roster * Made at least one Pro Bowl during career

=== Undrafted free agents ===
1970 undrafted free agents of note
Player	Position	College
Max Croshaw	Linebacker	Weber State
Tony Fornczak	Kicker	Milwaukee Area Technical College
Les Perry	Running back	Concordia (Moorhead)
Bob Swanson	Running back	Lea (Minnesota)

== Roster ==
1970 Green Bay Packers roster
Quarterbacks: 11 Rick Norton; 10 Frank Patrick; 15 Bart Starr; Running backs: 44 Donny Anderson P; 33 Jim Grabowski; 25 Dave Hampton; 30 Larry Krause; 31 Perry Williams; Wide receivers: 80 Jack Clancy; 84 Carroll Dale; 85 John Spilis; Tight ends: 86 John Hilton; 81 Rich McGeorge	Offensive linemen: 57 Ken Bowman C; 61 Dave Bradley G; 68 Gale Gillingham G; 75 Forrest Gregg T; 77 Bill Hayhoe T; 72 Dick Himes T; 62 Bill Lueck G; 71 Francis Peay T; 54 Malcolm Walker C; Defensive linemen: 82 Lionel Aldridge DE; 87 Marty Amsler DE; 78 Bob Brown DT/DE; 73 Kevin Hardy DT; 76 Mike McCoy DT; 83 Clarence Williams DE	Linebackers: 53 Fred Carr OLB; 50 Jim Carter OLB; 59 Rudy Kuechenberg MLB; 66 Ray Nitschke MLB; 52 Cleo Walker OLB; Defensive backs: 48 Ken Ellis CB; 28 Leon Harden SS; 43 Doug Hart SS; 21 Bob Jeter CB; 29 Al Matthews CB; 24 Willie Wood FS; Special teams: 37 Dale Livingston K	Reserve lists: 13 Don Horn QB (IR); 70 Rich Moore DT (IR); 89 Dave Robinson LB (IR); 23 Travis Williams RB (IR); Taxi squad: 36 Mike Carter WR; 45 Ervin Hunt CB; -- Jerry Warren K

== Regular season ==
=== Schedule ===
The Packers finished 6–8 in the regular season, failing to reach the playoffs for the third consecutive season. The schedule had the Packers play their final five games on the road and they lost four of them. For the first time, the Packers lost to the Dallas Cowboys; this year's game was on Thanksgiving on the artificial turf of the Cotton Bowl. Green Bay had won the first six meetings, four in the regular season (1960, 1964, 1965, 1968) and two in NFL championship games (1966, 1967). The Packers won the next meeting in Green Bay in 1972.

Week	Date	Opponent	Result	Record	Venue	Attendance
1	September 20	**Detroit Lions**	**L** 0–40	0–1	Lambeau Field	56,263
2	September 27	Atlanta Falcons	**W** 27–24	1–1	Lambeau Field	56,263
3	October 4	**Minnesota Vikings**	**W** 13–10	2–1	Milwaukee County Stadium	47,967
4	October 12	at San Diego Chargers	**W** 22–20	3–1	San Diego Stadium	53,064
5	October 18	Los Angeles Rams	**L** 21–31	3–2	Lambeau Field	56,263
6	October 25	Philadelphia Eagles	**W** 30–17	4–2	Milwaukee County Stadium	48,022
7	November 1	at San Francisco 49ers	**L** 10–26	4–3	Kezar Stadium	59,335
8	November 9	Baltimore Colts	**L** 10–13	4–4	Milwaukee County Stadium	48,063
9	November 15	**Chicago Bears**	**W** 20–19	5–4	Lambeau Field	56,263
10	November 22	at **Minnesota Vikings**	**L** 3–10	5–5	Metropolitan Stadium	47,900
11	November 26	at Dallas Cowboys	**L** 3–16	5–6	Cotton Bowl	67,182
12	December 6	at Pittsburgh Steelers	**W** 20–12	6–6	Three Rivers Stadium	46,418
13	December 13	at **Chicago Bears**	**L** 17–35	6–7	Wrigley Field	44,957
14	December 20	at **Detroit Lions**	**L** 0–20	6–8	Tiger Stadium	57,387
Note: Intra-division opponents are in **bold** text.

=== Game summaries ===
==== Week 4: at San Diego Chargers ====
Week Four: Green Bay Packers at San Diego Chargers – Game summary

Quarter	1	2	3	4	Total
**Packers**	3	3	13	3	**22**
Chargers	0	6	0	14	**20**

at San Diego Stadium, San Diego, California

- Date: October 12
- Game time: 8:00 p.m. CST/6:00 p.m. PDT
- Game weather: 68 °F (20.0 °C), relative humidity 72%, wind 8 mph
- Game attendance: 53,064
- Box score

Game information

**First quarter**

- GB – Dale Livingston 16-yard field goal. Packers 3–0.

**Second quarter**

- GB – Dale Livingston 27-yard field goal. Packers 6–0.
- SDG – Mike Mercer 16-yard field goal. Packers 6–3.
- SDG – Mike Mercer 39-yard field goal. Tied 6–6.

**Third quarter**

- GB – Jack Clancy 4-yard pass from Bart Starr (kick blocked). Packers 12–6.
- GB – John Hilton 2-yard pass from Bart Starr (Dale Livingston kick). Packers 19–6.

**Fourth quarter**

- SDG – Willie Frazier 24-yard run (Mike Mercer kick). Packers 19–13.
- SDG – Jeff Queen 1-yard run (Mike Mercer kick). Chargers 20–19.
- GB – Dale Livingston 14-yard field goal. Packers 22–20.

**Top passers**

- GB – Bart Starr – 16/20, 158 yards, 2 TD
- SDG – John Hadl – 6/19, 53 yards, 3 INT

**Top rushers**

- GB – Travis Williams – 21 rushes, 109 yards
- SDG – Willie Frazier – 2 rushes, 94 yards, TD

**Top receivers**

- GB – Carroll Dale – 8 receptions, 90 yards
- SDG – Dave Smith – 1 reception, 42 yards

=== Standings ===
NFC Central
	W	L	T	PCT	DIV	CONF	PF	PA	STK
Minnesota Vikings	12	2	0	.857	5–1	10–1	335	143	W3
Detroit Lions	10	4	0	.714	4–2	7–4	347	202	W5
Green Bay Packers	6	8	0	.429	2–4	4–7	196	293	L2
Chicago Bears	6	8	0	.429	1–5	5–6	256	261	W2

Note: Tie games were not officially counted in the standings until 1972.

== Aftermath ==
After a turbulent season filled with labor disputes, blowout losses, and the final merger of the AFL and NFL, the Packers had only their second losing season (1968) since 1958. Thoroughly frustrated, third-year head coach Phil Bengtson resigned two days after being shut out in the season finale against the Detroit Lions. His overall record was 20–21–1 during three seasons as Lombardi's handpicked successor. Obviously the organization and the community craved the high standards of winning established a decade earlier; Lombardi did not have a losing season but Bengston had two in three years and finished in third place in the four-team division each season.

The 1970 season was also the final season of Forrest Gregg as a Packer, a year later the Hall of Fame right tackle returned home to Texas to play for the Dallas Cowboys, where he joined his former teammates Herb Adderley and Lee Roy Caffey. The former Packer trio helped the Cowboys to win their 1st Super Bowl victory in franchise history.

== Statistical leaders ==
The following players led the Packers in the following statistical categories in 1970.

Passing
Leader	Comp	Att	Yds	Td	Int
Bart Starr	144	255	1645	8	13
Rushing
Leader	Att	Yds	YPA	Tds	
Donny Anderson	222	853	3.8	5	
Travis Williams	74	276	3.7	1	
Receiving
Leader	Rec	Yds	YPC	Tds	
Carroll Dale	49	814	16.6	2	
Donny Anderson	36	414	11.5	0	
John Hilton	25	350	14.0	4	
