= 1975 Green Bay Packers season =

NFL team season

- Head coach: Bart Starr
- Home stadium: Lambeau Field; Milwaukee County Stadium

Results
- Record: 4–10
- Division place: 4th NFC Central
- Playoffs: Did not qualify

The 1975 Green Bay Packers season was their 57th season overall and their 55th season in the National Football League. Under new head coach Bart Starr, they finished at 4–10, last in the four-team NFC Central division.

The Packers opened with four losses, then beat the Super Bowl-bound Dallas Cowboys on the road for Starr's first coaching win. After a 1–8 start, Green Bay ended the season on a positive note, winning three of their final five games.

== Offseason ==
=== NFL draft ===
1975 Green Bay Packers draft
Round	Pick	Player	Position	College	Notes
2	47	Bill Bain	Guard	USC	
3	58	Willard Harrell	Running back	Pacific	
4	88	Steve Luke	Safety	Ohio State	
7	165	Tony Giaquinto	Wide receiver	Central Connecticut State	
9	217	Jay Hodgin	Running back	South Carolina	
10	244	Bill Cooke	Defensive end	UMass	
11	269	Bob Martin	Defensive end	Washington	
12	296	Alan Autry	Quarterback	Pacific	
13	321	Bob Fuhriman	Defensive back	Utah State	
14	348	Stan Blackmon	Tight end	North Texas State	
15	373	Randy Allen	Wide receiver	Southern	
16	400	Bob McCaffrey	Center	USC	
17	425	Tom Ray	Defensive back	Central Michigan	
Made roster

=== Undrafted free agents ===
1975 undrafted free agents of note
Player	Position	College
Ernie DeChellis	Wide receiver	Villanova
Johnnie Gray	Safety	Cal State Fullerton
Bill Kairit	Defensive tackle	Brown
Steve Lainhart	Quarterback	Vanderbilt
Donn Pierce	Linebacker	St. Norbert
Charlie Uillimer	Defensive tackle	Wisconsin-Milwaukee
Dave Wehmeyer	Fullback	Texas Lutheran

== Roster ==
Green Bay Packers roster
Quarterbacks: 19 Carlos Brown; 21 John Hadl; 12 Don Milan; Running backs: 42 John Brockington; 40 Willard Harrell; 33 Barty Smith; 26 Eric Torkelson; 27 Terry Wells; Wide receivers: 84 Steve Odom; 85 Ken Payne; 80 Barry Smith; 82 Gerald Tinker; Tight ends: 88 Bert Askson; 81 Rich McGeorge	Offensive linemen: 69 Bill Bain T; 72 Dick Himes T; 62 Pat Matson G; 58 Bob McCaffrey C; 54 Larry McCarren C; 70 Ernie McMillan T; 61 Bruce Van Dyke G; 65 Keith Wortman G; Defensive linemen: 76 Mike McCoy DT; 73 Steve Okoniewski DT; 75 Dave Pureifory DT; 87 Alden Roche DE; 74 Dave Roller DE; 83 Clarence Williams DE	Linebackers: 57 Ron Acks MLB/OLB; 53 Fred Carr OLB; 50 Jim Carter MLB; 55 Tom Hull MLB; 59 Tom Toner OLB; 52 Gary Weaver OLB; Defensive backs: 48 Ken Ellis CB; 24 Johnnie Gray FS; 44 Charlie Hall CB/S; 46 Steve Luke SS; 29 Al Matthews SS; 38 Hurles Scales CB; 45 Perry Smith CB; Special teams: 11 David Beverly P; 18 Joe Danelo K	Reserve lists: 28 Willie Buchanon CB (IR); 78 Bill Cooke DE (IR); 86 Kent Gaydos WR (IR); 51 Larry Hefner LB (IR); -- Ken Hutcherson LB (IR); -- Randy Jackson T (IR); 13 Chester Marcol K (IR); 64 Bart Purvis T (IR); 89 Charlie Wade WR (IR); Rookies in italics

== Regular season ==
=== Schedule ===
In week 5, the Packers defeated the Dallas Cowboys on the road, improving their all-time record to 8–1 over the Cowboys; the sole loss was in 1970. Dallas was the eventual NFC champion and advanced to Super Bowl X.

Week	Date	Opponent	Result	Record	Venue	Attendance
1	September 21	**Detroit Lions**	**L** 16–30	0–1	Milwaukee County Stadium	52,613
2	September 29	at Denver Broncos	**L** 13–23	0–2	Mile High Stadium	52,621
3	October 5	Miami Dolphins	**L** 7–31	0–3	Lambeau Field	56,267
4	October 12	at New Orleans Saints	**L** 19–20	0–4	Louisiana Superdome	51,371
5	October 19	at Dallas Cowboys	**W** 19–17	1–4	Texas Stadium	64,189
6	October 26	Pittsburgh Steelers	**L** 13–16	1–5	Milwaukee County Stadium	52,815
7	November 2	**Minnesota Vikings**	**L** 17–28	1–6	Lambeau Field	56,267
8	November 9	at **Chicago Bears**	**L** 14–27	1–7	Soldier Field	48,738
9	November 16	at **Detroit Lions**	**L** 10–13	1–8	Pontiac Silverdome	76,946
10	November 23	New York Giants	**W** 40–14	2–8	Milwaukee County Stadium	50,150
11	November 30	**Chicago Bears**	**W** 28–7	3–8	Lambeau Field	56,267
12	December 7	at **Minnesota Vikings**	**L** 3–24	3–9	Metropolitan Stadium	46,147
13	December 14	at Los Angeles Rams	**L** 5–22	3–10	Los Angeles Memorial Coliseum	66,496
14	December 21	Atlanta Falcons	**W** 22–13	4–10	Lambeau Field	56,267

Monday (September 29)

Note: Intra-division opponents are in bold text.

=== Game summaries ===
==== Week 10 ====
Team	1	2	3	4	Total
Giants	0	0	14	0	14
• **Packers**	14	10	0	16	40

- Date: November 23
- Location: Milwaukee County Stadium, Milwaukee, Wisconsin
- Game start: 1:00 p.m. CST
- Game weather: Clear, 29 °F (−2 °C), wind 7 mph (11 km/h)
- Source: Pro-Football-Reference.com

Scoring summary
1	Packers	Willard Harrell 36-yard pass from John Hadl (Joe Danelo kick)	Packers 7–0
1	Packers	Eric Torkelson 2-yard run (Joe Danelo kick)	Packers 14–0
2	Packers	Joe Danelo 28-yard field goal	Packers 17–0
2	Packers	Steve Odom 23-yard pass from Willard Harrell (Joe Danelo kick)	Packers 24–0
3	Giants	Walker Gillette 12-yard pass from Craig Morton (George Hunt kick)	Packers 24–7
3	Giants	Doug Kotar 10-yard run (George Hunt kick)	Packers 24–14
4	Packers	Safety, Dave Jennings stepped out of end zone	Packers 26–14
4	Packers	Barty Smith 3-yard run (Joe Danelo kick)	Packers 33–14
4	Packers	Gerald Tinker 35-yard pass from John Hadl (Joe Danelo kick)	Packers 40–14

==== Week 11 ====
Team	1	2	3	4	Total
Bears	0	0	7	0	7
• Packers	7	21	0	0	28

- Date: November 30
- Location: Lambeau Field, Green Bay, Wisconsin
- Game start: 1:00 p.m.
- Game weather: 39 °F (4 °C), wind 18 mph (29 km/h)

Scoring summary
1	GB	John Brockington 1-yard run (Joe Danelo kick)	Packers 7–0
2	GB	John Brockington 1-yard run (Joe Danelo kick)	Packers 14–0
2	GB	Steve Odom 14-yard pass from Willard Harrell (Joe Danelo kick)	Packers 21–0
2	GB	John Brockington 8-yard run (Joe Danelo kick)	Packers 28–0
3	CHI	Walter Payton 1-yard run (Bob Thomas kick)	Packers 28–7

=== Standings ===
NFC Central
	W	L	T	PCT	DIV	CONF	PF	PA	STK
^{(1)} Minnesota Vikings	12	2	0	.857	5–1	8–2	377	180	W1
Detroit Lions	7	7	0	.500	4–2	6–5	245	262	L1
Chicago Bears	4	10	0	.286	2–4	4–7	191	379	W1
Green Bay Packers	4	10	0	.286	1–5	4–7	226	285	W1

== Awards and records ==
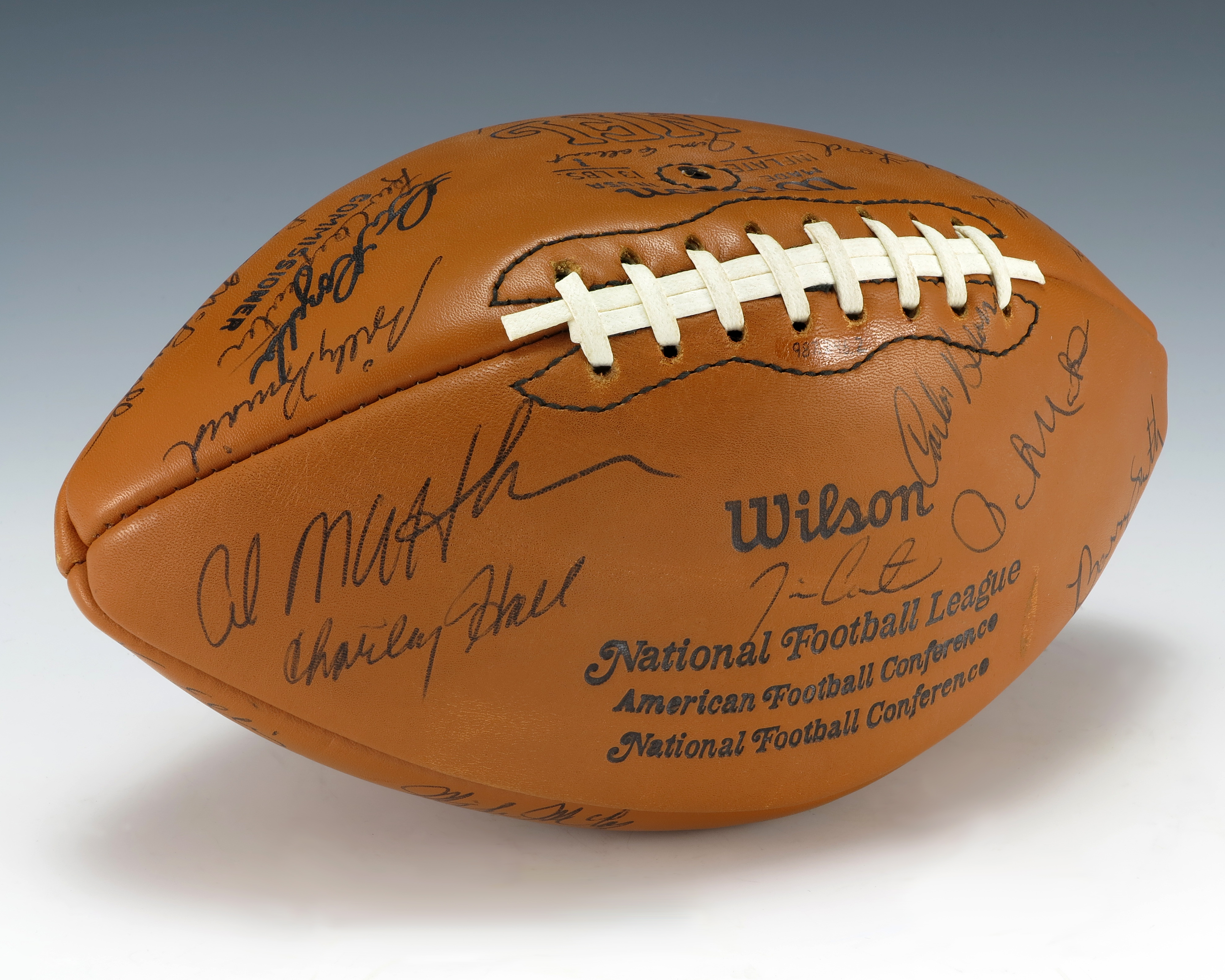
A football signed by the 1975 Green Bay Packers
