= Bob Kroll =

Bob Kroll may refer to:

- Bob Kroll (American football) (born 1950), defensive back with the Green Bay Packers
- Bob Kroll (police officer) (born c. 1965), former president of the Police Officers Federation of Minneapolis

== See also ==
- Robert Henderson Croll
