= Ray Nitschke =

American football player (1936–1998)

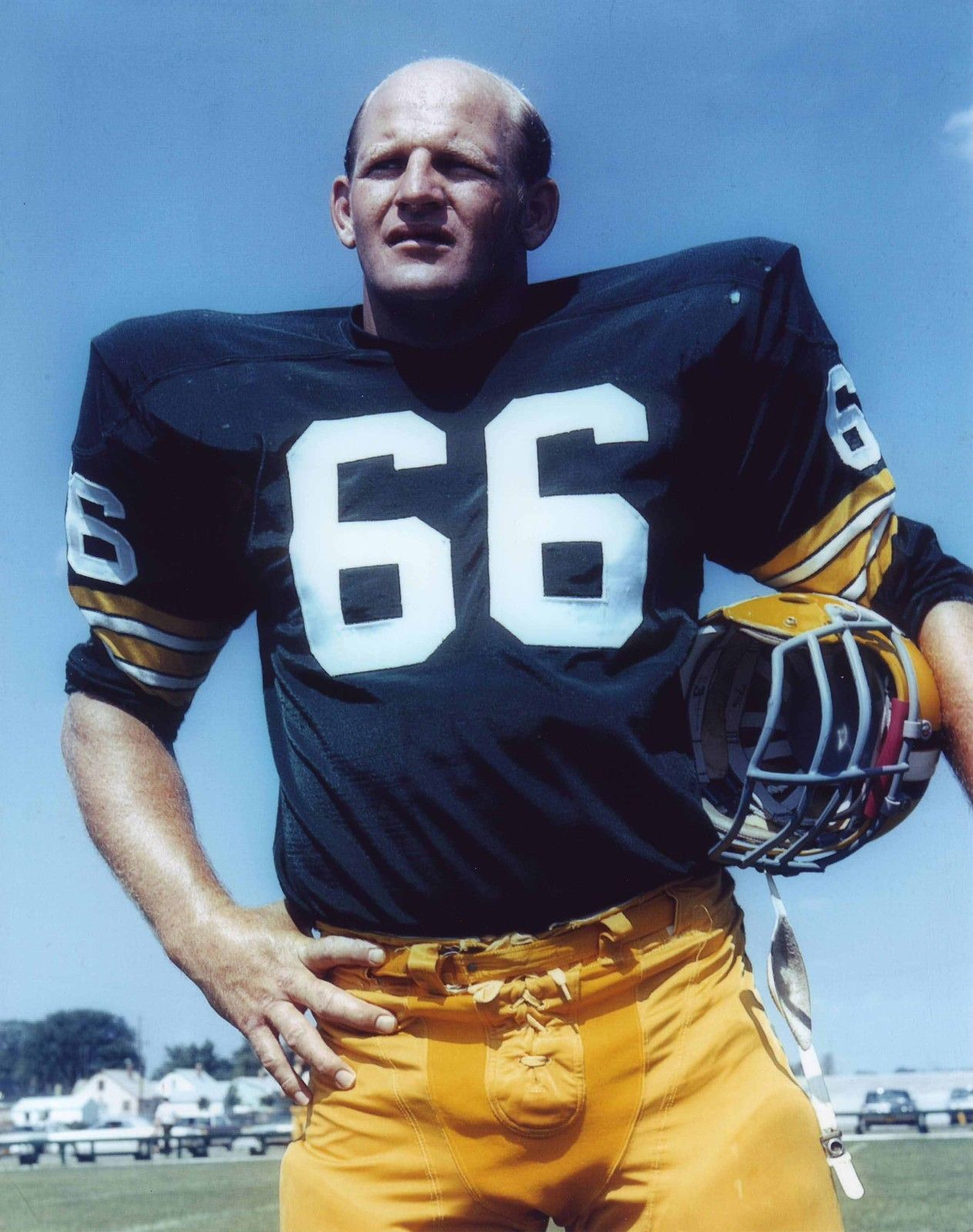
- Nitschke circa 1966

No. 33, 66
- Position: Linebacker

Personal information
- Born: December 29, 1936; Elmwood Park, Illinois, U.S.
- Died: March 8, 1998 (aged 61); Venice, Florida, U.S.
- Listed height: 6 ft 3 in (1.91 m)
- Listed weight: 235 lb (107 kg)

Career information
- High school: Proviso Township (Maywood, Illinois)
- College: Illinois
- NFL draft: 1958: 3rd round, 36th overall pick

Career history
- Green Bay Packers (1958–1972)

Awards and highlights
- 2× Super Bowl champion (I, II); 5× NFL champion (1961, 1962, 1965–1967); 2× First-team All-Pro (1964, 1966); 5× Second-team All-Pro (1962, 1963, 1965, 1967, 1969); 1× Pro Bowl (1964); NFL 1960s All-Decade Team; NFL 50th Anniversary All-Time Team; NFL 75th Anniversary All-Time Team; Green Bay Packers Hall of Fame; Green Bay Packers No. 66 retired; Second-team All-Big Ten (1957)

Career NFL statistics
- Interceptions: 25
- Interception yards: 385
- Defensive touchdowns: 2
- Stats at Pro Football Reference
- Pro Football Hall of Fame

Raymond Ernest Nitschke (December 29, 1936 – March 8, 1998) was an American professional football player who spent his entire 15-year career as a linebacker in the National Football League (NFL) with the Green Bay Packers. Enshrined in the Pro Football Hall of Fame in 1978, he was the anchor of the defense for head coach Vince Lombardi in the 1960s, leading the Packers to five NFL championships and victories in the first two Super Bowls.

== Early life ==
Nitschke was born in Elmwood Park, Illinois, the youngest of three sons to Robert and Anna Nitschke. His father was killed in a car accident in 1940, and his mother died of a blood clot when Ray was 13. Older brothers Robert Jr. (age 21) and Richard (age 17) decided they would raise Ray on their own.

Nitschke entered Proviso Township High School in Maywood shortly before his mother's death. The loss of both parents enraged Nitschke, and the lack of a parental disciplinarian to quell his rage caused him to engage in fights with other kids in the neighborhood. During his freshman year at Proviso, he played fullback on one of the school's three football teams. He was a poor student and his grades eventually caught up with him as he was declared academically ineligible to play sports his sophomore year. He would lament this embarrassment for the rest of his life.

He succeeded in raising his grades enough in his sophomore year to allow him to play sports his junior year, when he had grown significantly (to six feet tall). He starred on the varsity football team, playing quarterback on offense and safety on defense for coach Andy Puplis. He played varsity basketball and was a pitcher and left fielder for the varsity baseball team. His baseball skills brought him an offer from the professional St. Louis Browns with a $3,000 signing bonus. Nitschke was also offered scholarships from college football programs around the country. Puplis advised him to accept a football scholarship. Wanting to play at a Big Ten university, with a chance to appear in the Rose Bowl, he accepted a football scholarship to the University of Illinois in 1954.

== College career ==
While at Illinois, Nitschke smoked, drank heavily, and fought at the drop of a hat. Never a good student in high school, his grades suffered at college. In his sophomore year in 1955, due to a depletion of players in the offensive backfield, Illini head coach Ray Eliot moved Nitschke from quarterback to fullback, shattering his childhood dream of quarterbacking a team to a victory in the Rose Bowl. At this time, college football had reverted to primarily single-platoon football, meaning those players that were on offense had to switch to defense, and vice versa, when ball possession changed. On defense, Nitschke played linebacker. He proved to be a very skilled player and tackler as a linebacker, so much so that, by his senior year, Paul Brown considered him the best linebacker in college football.

In his junior year in 1956 Nitschke lost his four front teeth on the opening kick-off against Ohio State. Nitschke never wore a face mask and one of the Buckeye's player's helmets hit him in the mouth knocking out two teeth initially; the other two were hanging by the roots. He played the rest of the game.

== Professional career ==
Growing up in the outskirts of Chicago, Nitschke had idolized the Bears and he hoped to be chosen by them in the 1958 NFL draft, held on December 2, 1957. However, he was chosen by the Green Bay Packers late in the third round (36th overall) of what is considered the greatest draft in the franchise's history. It included three other significant Packers of the 1960s, linebacker Dan Currie of Michigan State (3rd overall), fullback Jim Taylor of LSU (15th overall) and right guard Jerry Kramer of Idaho (39th overall). Their rookie season in 1958 under first-year head coach Ray "Scooter" McLean was dismal, with just one win and one tie for the worst record in the 12-team league. Nitschke wore number 33 in 1958 and 66 the rest of his career with the Packers.

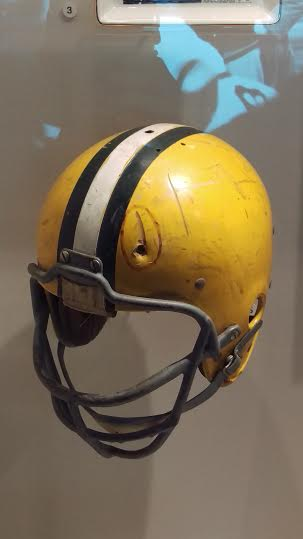
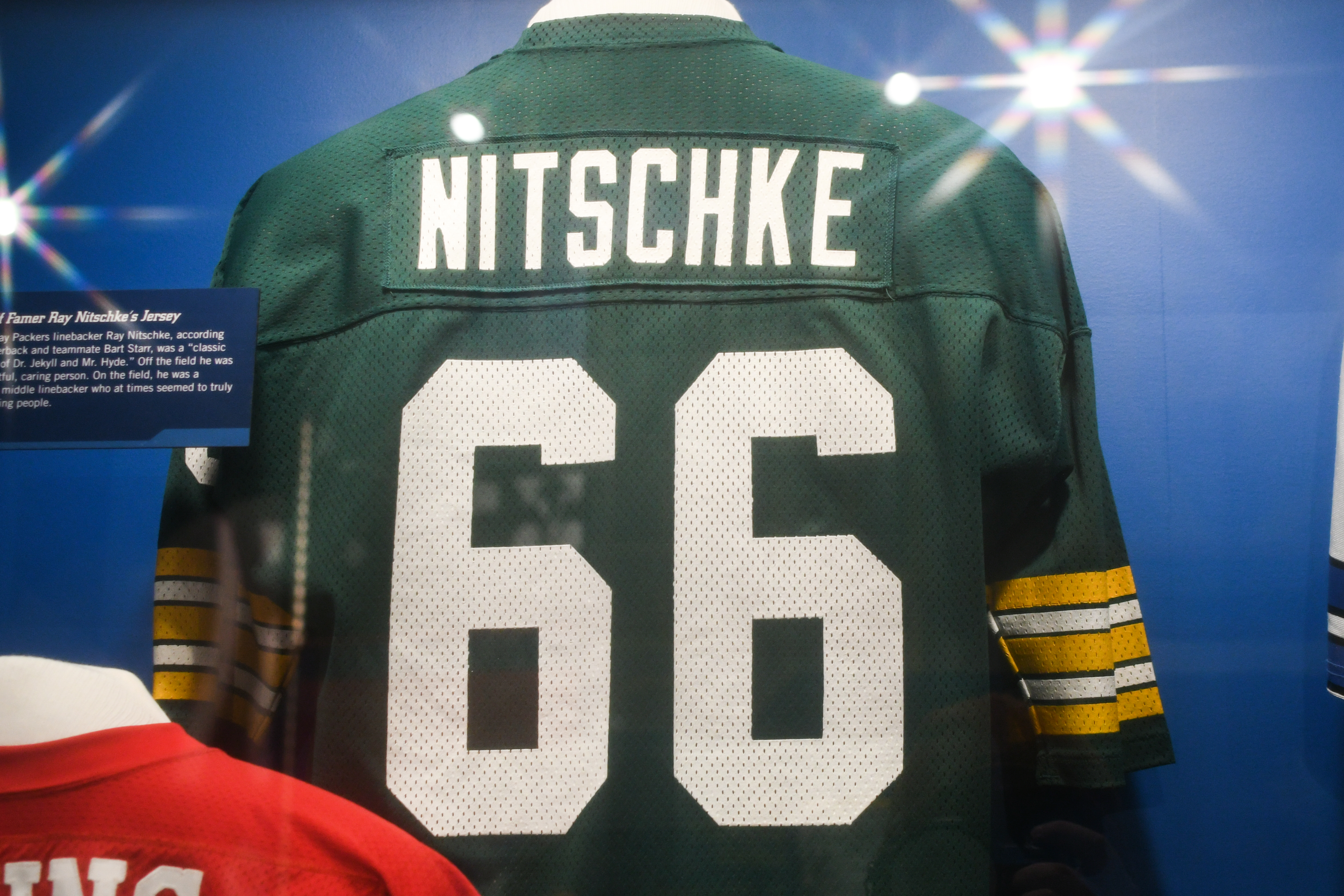
Left: Nitschke's helmet from the coaching tower incident in September 1960; right: his #66 jersey exhibited at the Pro Football Hall of Fame

A month after the 1958 season ended, Vince Lombardi was hired as head coach. Nitschke became a full-time starter in 1962, the anchor of a disciplined defense that helped win five NFL titles and the first two Super Bowls in the 1960s. He was the MVP of the 1962 NFL Championship Game, accepting the prize of a 1963 Chevrolet Corvette. In the game, Nitschke recovered two fumbles and deflected a pass that was intercepted. The Packers won 16–7 and finished the season with a 14–1 record. In Super Bowl I, Nitschke contributed six tackles and a sack. In Super Bowl II, Nitschke led Green Bay's defense with nine tackles.

Nitschke remained a starter through the 1970 season, but in 1971 he was benched by new coach Dan Devine and became a reserve to Jim Carter. At the end of the 1972 season, the 9–4 Packers traveled to New Orleans to play the 2–10–1 Saints on December 17 at Tulane Stadium, which turned out to be Nitschke's last regular season game. He recorded the only pass reception of his career, a 34-yard gain after a blocked Packer field goal attempt, and they won 30–20 to finish at 10–4, their best regular season record since 1966. Green Bay had clinched the NFC Central division title the week before at Minnesota for their first playoff berth in five seasons. In the divisional round of the playoffs on Christmas Eve, Green Bay lost 16–3 at Washington. Nitschke returned for a 16th training camp in 1973, then retired in late August.

Nitschke was known for his strength and toughness, exhibited prior to his third season in 1960. On the Packers' practice field on September 1, a 1,000-pound (450 kg) steel coaching tower was blown over by a strong gust of wind, on top of Nitschke. (It was erroneously first reported as 5,000 lb (2,270 kg).) Lombardi ran over to see what had happened, but when told it had fallen on Nitschke, said, "He'll be fine. Get back to work!" According to Nitschke's biography, a spike was driven into his helmet, but did not injure him. The helmet (with the hole) is currently on display in the Packer Hall of Fame in Green Bay. Although Nitschke was known for his hard hitting, he was an athletic all-around linebacker who also intercepted 25 passes over his career.

== Personal life ==
Nitschke was married on June 26, 1961, to Jackie Forchette. Jackie was unable to have children, so they adopted three: John in 1963, Richard in 1966, and Amy in 1972. Ray and Jackie had a winter home in Naples, Florida. Lombardi gave partial credit for Nitschke's success to Nitschke's wife, whose calming influence helped Ray focus on his career. Nitschke remained popular in Green Bay after retiring, even having his phone number and home address published in the Green Bay phone book.

In 1973, Mean on Sunday: The Autobiography of Ray Nitschke ("as told to Robert W. Wells") was published by Doubleday. The review in Kirkus Reviews concluded, "This lacks the wider appeal of, say, an Instant Replay and it's antithetical to the juicy Ball Four genre. But Packer fans and others around the league who admired Nitschke's professional skills might pick this up as a reminder of the man beneath the armor."

In the late 1980s, Nitschke owned an automobile dealership in Green Bay. He performed several of his own TV commercials in which he brought out his dog, "Butkus", named in honor of his Chicago Bears nemesis, Dick Butkus (who like Nitschke, grew up in the Chicago area and played for the Illinois Fighting Illini). He appeared in the comic film Head, starring The Monkees, as a football player who repeatedly tackles Peter Tork in a mock war movie sequence. His character is listed in the credits as "Private One" because his jersey is emblazoned with the number "1". Nitschke also appeared in the 1974 football comedy The Longest Yard as Guard Bogdanski.

Nitschke died of a heart attack in Venice, Florida at the age of 61 in 1998. He had been driving to the home of a family friend, according to his daughter, Amy Klaas, who was with him when he was stricken. He was pronounced dead at Venice Hospital.

== Honors ==
Nitschke's number was retired by the Packers in 1983.

His No. 66 was retired in 1983, the fourth of six numbers retired by the Packers. The only other Lombardi-era player to have his number retired is quarterback Bart Starr, whose number 15 was retired in 1973. Also, the team has named one of its two outdoor practice fields "Ray Nitschke Field". Prior to its retirement, number 66 had remained in circulation and was last worn in 1983 by offensive lineman Lawrence Pfohl, who would go on to fame as a professional wrestler under the ring name Lex Luger.

In 1969, he was named the NFL's all-time top Linebacker by the NFL in honor of the NFL's 50th Anniversary. Thus he is the only linebacker to have made both the NFL's 50th and 75th Anniversary Teams.

He was elected to the Pro Football Hall of Fame in 1978. Every year, the Pro Football Hall of Fame has a luncheon the day before its induction ceremony, attended by most of the living members and honoring the new inductees. Nitschke always spoke at this luncheon, telling the new inductees what a great honor they were receiving, and that they were now members of the greatest team of them all. Following his death, the Hall named the luncheon after him. He was elected to the Wisconsin Athletic Hall of Fame in 1981. He was inducted into the Green Bay Packers Hall of Fame in 1978.

Upon the election of former teammate Henry Jordan to the Pro Football Hall of Fame on the eve of Super Bowl XXIX in Miami Gardens, Florida, Nitschke flew down to Florida to participate in the game's coin-toss ceremonies, joining three other 75th Anniversary Team representatives--Otto Graham (1950s), Mean Joe Greene (1970s) and Gale Sayers (1960s), all three of whom had been announced as representatives of their respective decades in the ceremony months prior to the PFHOF election—as well as three of Jordan's fellow Class of 1995 newcomers, all of whom represented the 1980s: Kellen Winslow, Lee Roy Selmon, and then-U.S. Congressman Steve Largent, who ended the pregame ceremonies by flipping the coin.

In 1999, he was ranked number 18 on The Sporting News' list of the 100 Greatest Football Players, making him the highest-ranked player coached by Vince Lombardi, second among Packers behind Don Hutson, and third among linebackers behind Lawrence Taylor and Dick Butkus.

== Legacy ==
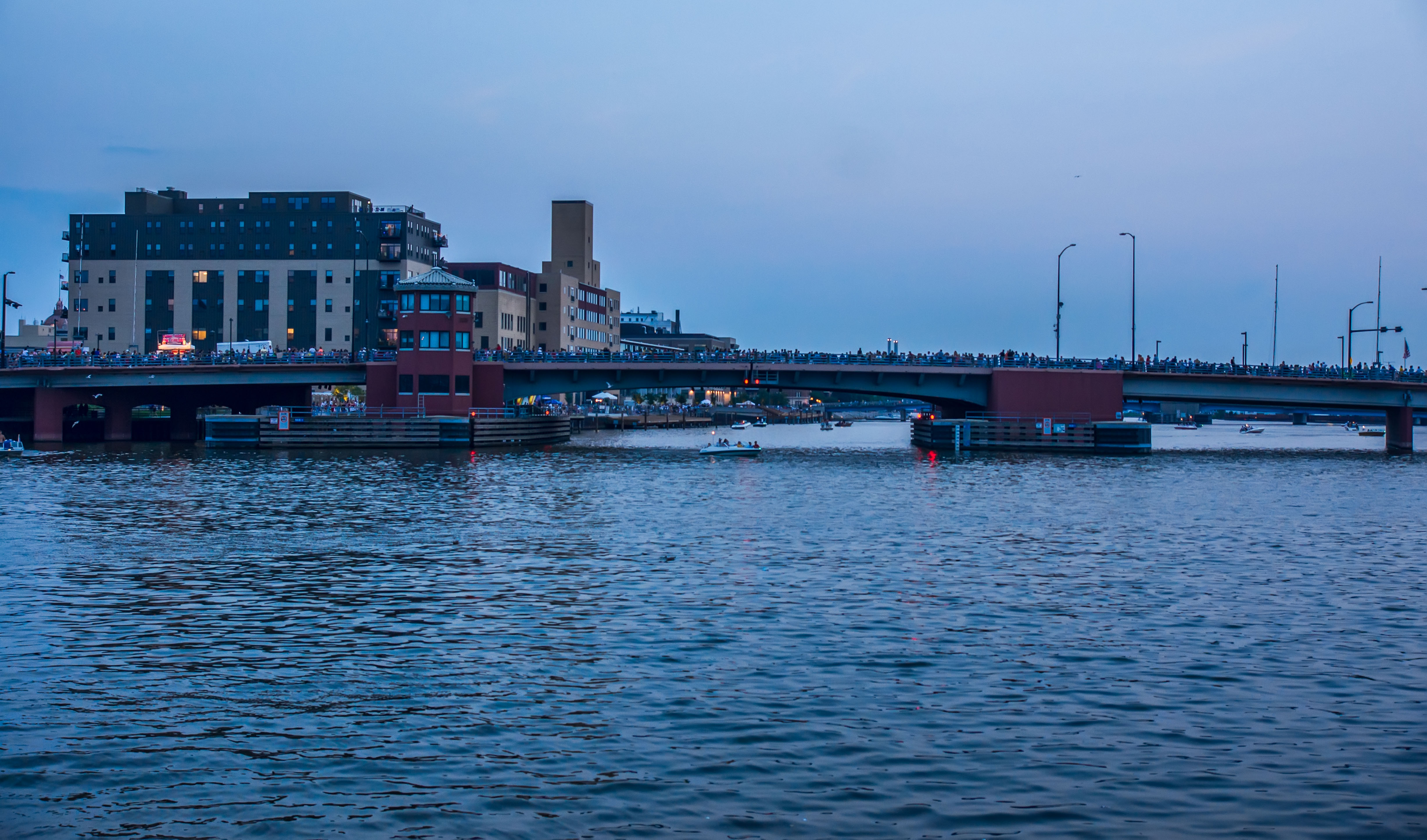
Ray Nitschke Memorial Bridge

The Ray Nitschke Memorial Bridge, a twin-leaf bascule bridge over the Fox River on Main Street (US 141) in Green Bay, was named in honor of Nitschke. The bridge was constructed in 1998 to replace the former Main Street Bridge built in 1923.

He was a guest on "What's My Line" on December 30, 1962.
