= Rich McGeorge =

American football player (1948–2025)

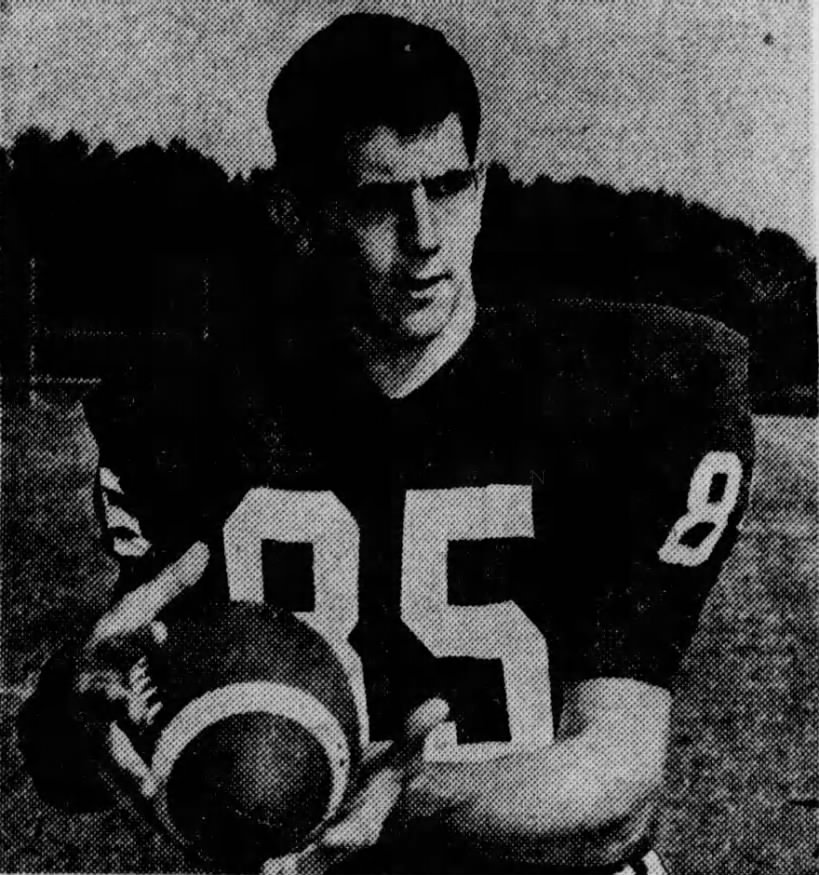
- McGeorge c. 1968

No. 81
- Position: Tight end

Personal information
- Born: September 14, 1948; Roanoke, Virginia, U.S.
- Died: December 20, 2025 (aged 77); Durham, North Carolina, U.S.
- Listed height: 6 ft 4 in (1.93 m)
- Listed weight: 235 lb (107 kg)

Career information
- High school: Jefferson (Roanoke)
- College: Elon (1966–1969)
- NFL draft: 1970: 1st round, 16th overall pick

Career history

Playing
- Green Bay Packers (1970–1978); Detroit Lions (1979)*
- * Offseason or practice squad member only

Coaching
- Duke (1981–1982) Tight ends coach; Birmingham Stallions (1983–1984) Wide receivers coach & tight ends coach; Tampa Bay Bandits (1985) Offensive line coach; Duke (1987–1989) Offensive line coach; Florida (1990–1992) Offensive line coach; Miami Dolphins (1993–1995) Tight ends coach & assistant offensive line coach; Miami Dolphins (1996–1999) Assistant offensive line coach; Green Bay Packers (2000) Assistant offensive line coach; Memphis Maniax (2001) Assistant head coach & offensive coordinator; Duke (2002) Offensive line coach; North Carolina Central (2003–2005) Offensive line coach; Shaw (2006–2011) Offensive line coach

Awards and highlights
- 3× First-team All-CIAC (1967–1969)

Career NFL statistics
- Receptions: 175
- Receiving yards: 2,370
- Receiving touchdowns: 13
- Stats at Pro Football Reference
- College Football Hall of Fame

Richard Eugene McGeorge (September 14, 1948 – December 20, 2025) was an American professional football player who was a tight end for nine seasons with the Green Bay Packers of the National Football League (NFL). He played college football for the Elon Fightin' Christians and was selected by the Packers in the first round of the 1970 NFL draft.

== Early life ==
Richard Eugene McGeorge was born on September 14, 1948, to Aubrey E. McGeorge and his wife. McGeorge attended Jefferson High School in Roanoke, Virginia, where he played baseball, basketball, and football. He lettered seven times during his high school career, and was noted for his prowess in both basketball and football.

== College playing career ==
After graduating from Jefferson, McGeorge enrolled and played football at Elon College (now Elon University). He had originally intended to play basketball, but head coach Bill Miller was not on campus when McGeorge took his initial campus tour. He was discovered by an assistant football coach while he passed a ball with a friend, and was offered a scholarship to Elon soon after.

After his freshman year, McGeorge was quickly noted as a player to be watched, achieving success as a starting end. In his sophomore season, McGeorge took in 53 receptions for 882 yards and eight touchdowns, leading to him breaking eight all-time records among Elon players at his position with two years of eligibility left. He was named the "Carolinas Conference Player of the Year" by Football Forecast following his sophomore season. He joined the first-team all-Conference roster three years in a row; 1967, 1968, and 1969. He was named Lineman of the Year for the CC during his junior year, and was named to the Associated Press Little All-America Team his senior year in 1969. He broke the national NAIA record for receptions, and all other reception records among Elon players.

While playing football, McGeorge continually wanted to play with the basketball team, a decision his coaches discouraged. He joined the team during his junior year, winning all-Conference honors. Only a select few Elon players had been named to all-Conference teams in two different sports up to that point.

== Professional playing career ==
McGeorge was selected 16th overall in the first round by the Green Bay Packers in the 1970 NFL draft, the first tight end selected. Other tight ends who would also go on to play in the NFL who were drafted after McGeorge in 1970 include Raymond Chester, Rich Caster and Stu Voigt.

While he did not start in any of the 14 games he played in his rookie season, he would go on to start 101 games for the Packers. He was the Packers' starting tight end in every 1971 game and in all Packers games between 1973 and 1978 but one. He caught 175 passes for 2,370 yards and 13 touchdowns in his NFL career. McGeorge had also started the first two games in 1972 but was lost for the season to a knee injury in the second regular season game, against the Oakland Raiders. He was therefore unavailable to play for the Packers in their playoff loss against the Washington Redskins—the only time the Packers made the playoffs in McGeorge's years there. McGeorge bounced back the next season and was named the Packers' offensive player of the year in 1973.

McGeorge was released by head coach Bart Starr in 1979, citing his age as the main reason for the decision. He was signed off of waivers by the Detroit Lions, but left the team after just two weeks.

== Post-playing career ==
McGeorge spent most of his post-NFL career as an assistant football coach and offensive coordinator. He was an assistant coach in three different pro football leagues: the NFL (with the Miami Dolphins), the USFL (with the Birmingham Stallions and Tampa Bay Bandits) and the XFL, where he was the offensive coordinator for the Memphis Maniax in the XFL's only season, 2001. He worked under Steve Spurrier at both Duke University and the University of Florida, and was his offensive coordinator with the Bandits. In addition, he worked as an assistant coach at North Carolina Central University and Shaw University. He was inducted into the College Football Hall of Fame in 2012 for his college football career at Elon University.

== Personal life and death ==
McGeorge received his BA degree in Health and Physical Education from Elon in 1971. He married his wife, Bonnie Moore, on December 14, 1969. They had two sons, Randy and Jason.

McGeorge died in Durham, North Carolina, on December 20, 2025, at the age of 77.

== NFL career statistics ==
Legend
**Bold**	Career high

Year	Team	Games		Receiving				
Year	Team	GP	GS	Rec	Yds	Avg	Lng	TD
1970	GNB	14	0	2	32	16.0	16	2
1971	GNB	14	14	27	**463**	**17.1**	50	**4**
1972	GNB	2	2	4	50	12.5	23	2
1973	GNB	14	14	16	260	16.3	44	1
1974	GNB	14	14	30	440	14.7	**51**	0
1975	GNB	14	14	**32**	458	14.3	43	1
1976	GNB	14	14	24	278	11.6	28	1
1977	GNB	14	13	17	142	8.4	18	1
1978	GNB	**16**	**16**	23	247	10.7	25	1
Career		116	101	175	2,370	13.5	51	13
