= John Spilis =

American football player (born 1947)

No. 85
- Position: Wide receiver

Personal information
- Born: October 14, 1947 (age 79); Chicago, Illinois, U.S.
- Listed height: 6 ft 3 in (1.91 m)
- Listed weight: 205 lb (93 kg)

Career information
- High school: Thornridge (Dolton, Illinois)
- College: Northern Illinois
- NFL draft: 1969: 3rd round, 64th overall pick

Career history
- Green Bay Packers (1969–1971)

Career NFL statistics
- Receptions: 27
- Receiving yards: 446
- Touchdowns: 1
- Stats at Pro Football Reference

John Arthur Spilis (born October 14, 1947) is a former wide receiver in the National Football League (NFL). He was drafted by the Green Bay Packers in the third round of the 1969 NFL/AFL draft and played three seasons with the team.

== College ==
Spilis played college football at Northern Illinois University from 1966 to 1968, where he was a split end and kickoff returner, and wore number 87. He led the Huskies twice (1967 and 1968) in receiving and scoring, and in 1968 led the team in all-purpose yards and kickoff returns. His 22 career touchdowns set an NIU record. Curiously, he caught the same number of passes—46—in each of his three years at NIU. He was honored as team co-captain and co-MVP in 1968, and was a selection for the College All-Star Game in 1969. He was also selected to play in the All-American Bowl, but was unable to play due to a broken leg.

== The Packers and the 1969 draft ==
Spilis was chosen by the Green Bay Packers in the third round of the 1969 NFL draft. He was the 8th wide receiver selected, one round before the Houston Oilers chose Hall of Fame wide receiver Charlie Joiner. Spilis went, by far, the highest any Northern Illinois player had been taken in the NFL draft; the previous high had been the 16th round. No other NIU Huskie would go as early as the third round until running back LeShon Johnson was also drafted by the Green Bay Packers in the third round in 1994. No Huskie would be taken as a higher overall pick until the San Diego Chargers picked defensive end Larry English in the first round in 2009.

The Packers' wide receivers corps had changed little during Vince Lombardi's last several years as head coach, but by 1969 change was in the air. Max McGee had retired after the 1967 season, and the remaining leading receivers, Boyd Dowler and Carroll Dale, were 31 and 32 years old respectively. In both the 1967 and 1968 drafts, the Packers had invested a pick in a wide receiver in the first four rounds--Dave Dunaway in the 2nd round in 1967 and John Robinson in the 4th round in 1968. But neither panned out for the Packers. Dunaway appeared in just two games with the Packers with zero catches before playing in only more 11 games elsewhere in the NFL after that. Robinson never appeared in an NFL regular season game at all.

== NFL years ==
Spilis played for the Packers in 1969, 1970 and 1971. He played in 12 of the team's 14 games in 1969, and played in all 14 games in both 1970 and 1971. His final year, 1971, was easily his most productive pro season. He started in 11 of 14 Packers games, after starting only six games total in the previous two seasons. He gained playing time that had been given the previous year to Jack Clancy at wide receiver, playing split end opposite Carroll Dale. Spilis scored his only NFL touchdown in the sixth Packers season game of 1971, a road loss to the Los Angeles Rams. Spilis caught a 32-yard touchdown pass from Zeke Bratkowski in the 4th quarter, the only Packers touchdown in a 30–13 defeat. Spilis spent the entire 1972 preseason with the Packers, but in spite of his increased role in 1971, some felt he would have to fight for a job for 1972. He was released in the team's final roster cuts before the start of the regular season. The Packers replaced Spilis with rookie Leland Glass. The 1971 Packers had been one of the weakest teams in the league in the passing game. Out of 26 teams, they were last in pass attempts, 25th in completions, 25th in first downs by passing, 24th in passing yards, and 23rd in touchdown passes.

== Honors ==
After his playing days, Spilis received multiple honors from his alma mater. He was named to NIU's All-Century Team and Century's Five Best Players in 1999 and was named the #9 player in Huskie Stadium history in 2015. Spilis was also honored in 2015 as part of the 50th anniversary celebration of Huskie Stadium by being commemorated on one of 22 full-size window clings honoring NIU football greats displayed on businesses in downtown DeKalb.
