= Ervin Hunt =

American football player (born 1947)

No. 45
- Position: Defensive back

Personal information
- Born: July 1, 1947 (age 79); Fowler, California, U.S.
- Listed height: 6 ft 2 in (1.88 m)
- Listed weight: 190 lb (86 kg)

Career information
- High school: Edison (California)
- College: Fresno State
- NFL draft: 1970: 6th round, 145th overall pick

Career history
- Green Bay Packers (1970)

Career NFL statistics
- Games played: 6
- Stats at Pro Football Reference

Ervin Jacob Hunt (born July 1, 1947) is an American former defensive back in the National Football League (NFL). Hunt was born in Fowler, California. He graduated from Edison High School in Fresno, California, in 1965. He played at the collegiate level at California State University, Fresno.

Hunt was drafted 145th overall by the Green Bay Packers in the sixth round of the 1970 NFL draft. Hunt was given a number of opportunities to develop and play with the Packers. Veteran players had threatened to strike in 1970, so only rookies were allowed at training camp, Hunt included. A little later, Herb Adderley, the Packers' star cornerback, retired from football and opened up the possibility of more playing time for Ervin, who had impressed the team's coaching staff. He played six games for the Packers in 1970.
