= Hise Austin =

American football player (1950–2019)

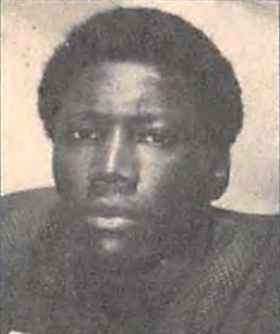
- Austin in 1973

No. 27, 21
- Position: Cornerback

Personal information
- Born: September 8, 1950; Houston, Texas, U.S.
- Died: June 4, 2019 (aged 68)
- Listed height: 6 ft 4 in (1.93 m)
- Listed weight: 191 lb (87 kg)

Career information
- High school: M. C. Williams (Texas)
- College: Wiley (1969); Prairie View A&M (1969–1972)
- NFL draft: 1973: 8th round, 202nd overall pick

Career history
- Green Bay Packers (1973); Portland Storm (1974); Dallas Cowboys (1975)*; Kansas City Chiefs (1975); San Francisco 49ers (1977)*
- * Offseason or practice squad member only

Career NFL statistics
- Games played: 12
- Stats at Pro Football Reference

Hise Austin (September 8, 1950 – June 4, 2019) was an American professional football player who was a cornerback for two seasons in the National Football League (NFL) with the Green Bay Packers and Kansas City Chiefs. He played college football and ran track for the Prairie View A&M Panthers, winning the Southwestern Athletic Conference (SWAC) championship in the 440-yard dash while being an All-SWAC performer in football. Austin was selected by the Packers in the eighth round of the 1973 NFL draft and played one season for them. He spent the 1974 season with the Portland Storm of the World Football League (WFL) before returning to the NFL in 1975, briefly being a member of the Dallas Cowboys before appearing in the final three games of the season for the Kansas City Chiefs. He was later a member of the San Francisco 49ers.

== Early life and college career ==
Austin was born on September 8, 1950, in Houston, Texas, United States. He attended M. C. Williams High School in Houston where he played football and ran track. In football, he played as a back before switching to end as a senior in 1968. He was an honorable mention All-Zone II performer at Williams. Austin graduated from high school in January 1969 and afterwards enrolled at Wiley College in Marshall, Texas, as "it was the nearest school to Houston to offer me a scholarship". He competed for Wiley's track team that year, but when the school announced that they were discontinuing their football program, he transferred to Prairie View A&M College following the spring semester.

At Prairie View A&M, Austin played for the football team as a cornerback and safety. After starting three games at cornerback as a freshman in 1969, he became the full-time starter in 1970 and was selected honorable mention All-Southwestern Athletic Conference (SWAC). He remained a starter and was named second-team All-SWAC as a senior in 1972. Austin was also selected to small college All-America teams in both football and track. In track, he served as the anchor of the school's mile relay team and helped them rank second nationally for a time. During the 1971 season, he was part of a Prairie View mile relay team that set the college division record, while in one meet he recorded a relay leg time of 45.4-seconds in the event. He also competed in the 220-yard dash and the 440-yard dash in college, winning the 1972 SWAC championship in the latter with a time of 45.2. Austin was later inducted into the Prairie View A&M Sports Hall of Fame in 1998.

== Professional career ==
Austin was selected by the Green Bay Packers in the eighth round (202nd overall) of the 1973 NFL draft. He was reported to have been able to run the 40-yard dash in 4.4-seconds, which the Wisconsin State Journal described as "the kind of statistic that makes pro scouts' mouths water". He also ran the 100-yard dash in 9.3-seconds. Standing at 6 feet 4 inches (1.93 m) and weighing 187 pounds (85 kg), Austin made the team for the 1973 season and appeared in nine games as a backup, while the Packers compiled a record of 5–7–2. On July 21, 1974, he signed a future contract with the Portland Storm of the World Football League (WFL), agreeing to join the team in 1975 while staying with the Packers in 1974. He signed with the Storm over frustration of not seeing significant playing time with the Packers, saying that, "I was unhappy. I was young and wanted to play. I was in a situation where they had Willie Buchanon and Ken Ellis and both are young ... If I had to sit around and wait for them to get old, I would have been old and still waiting because I am only a year behind them in age. So I decided the best thing for me to do was leave and try to go someplace else. The World Football League came up and I signed ... with them".

Austin was later released by the Packers at the start of the 1974 season, leading to him to join the Storm for the rest of the year. He appeared in nine games for the Storm, posting one interception while returning three kickoffs for 82 yards, as the team compiled a record of 7–12–1. He did not return to the team for the 1975 season. He told the Fort Worth Star-Telegram that he did not return due to the issues the league had in paying its players, saying that he did not receive any money for the entire 1974 WFL season. He said he only received half of a promised bonus for signing with the team: "Supposedly I was supposed to get the other half when I went back in '75. But I decided not to go back. So I just played all of last year for nothing". Nevertheless, Austin said he had no regrets joining the league: "No. I'm not bitter. It was a new league and a new experience and I was able to play and start. And that was a privilege".

Austin returned to the NFL and signed with the Dallas Cowboys on March 4, 1975. Gil Brandt, who led the team's scouting department, said that, "In our evaluation, he was the best defensive back in the WFL". He was limited by a pinched nerve in his hip and was waived by the Cowboys before the regular season. Afterwards, he began working in Houston as a substitute teacher. On December 3, 1975, he signed with the Kansas City Chiefs after several of the team's cornerbacks were injured. Austin saw significant playing time in the Chiefs' last three games of the 1975 season, posting one fumble recovery. He was initially re-signed for 1976 but was then released before the regular season. Austin was later briefly a member of the San Francisco 49ers during the 1977 offseason to conclude his career. He finished with 12 NFL games played.

== Later life and death ==
After his playing career, Austin worked at Wheatley High School in Houston, where he led the history department and served as assistant football coach under Ken Houston. He also was a pastor. Austin died on June 4, 2019, at the age of 68.
