= Dave Smith (running back) =

American football player (born 1947)

No. 42
- Position: Running back

Personal information
- Born: December 9, 1947; Salt Lake City, Utah, U.S.
- Listed height: 6 ft 1 in (1.85 m)
- Listed weight: 210 lb (95 kg)

Career information
- High school: Davis (Utah)
- College: Utah
- NFL draft: 1970: 13th round, 328th overall pick

Career history
- Green Bay Packers (1970)*; San Diego Chargers (1970)
- * Offseason or practice squad member only

Career NFL statistics
- Rushing attempts: 14
- Rushing yards: 42
- Receptions: 4
- Receiving yards: 65
- Stats at Pro Football Reference

Dave Smith (born December 9, 1947, in Salt Lake City, Utah) is a former running back in the National Football League (NFL).

== Career ==
Smith was drafted by the Green Bay Packers in the 13th round of the 1970 NFL draft. He played that season with the team. He played at the collegiate level at the University of Utah.
