= Cleo Walker =

American football player (born 1948)

No. 52, 51
- Positions: Linebacker, center

Personal information
- Born: February 7, 1948 (age 78); Columbus, Georgia, U.S.
- Listed height: 6 ft 3 in (1.91 m)
- Listed weight: 219 lb (99 kg)

Career information
- High school: William H. Spencer (Columbus)
- College: Louisville
- NFL draft: 1970: 7th round, 172nd overall pick

Career history
- Green Bay Packers (1970); Atlanta Falcons (1971)
- Stats at Pro Football Reference

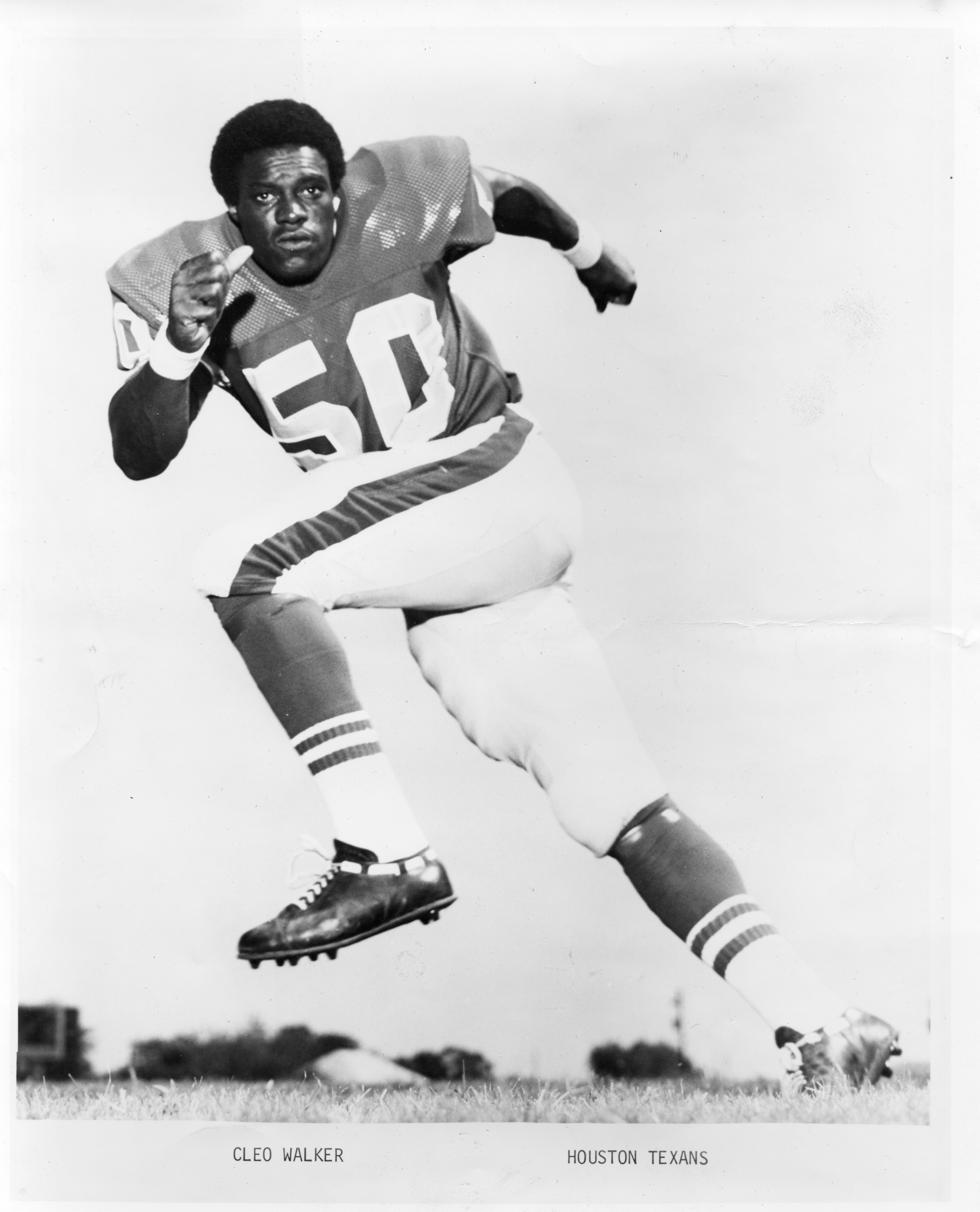
1974 publicity still of Cleo Walker with the Houston Texans of the WFL

Cleo Walker (born February 7, 1948) is an American former professional football linebacker and center in the National Football League (NFL) and the World Football League (WFL).

== Biography ==
Walker was born Cleo Franklin Walker on February 7, 1948, in Columbus, Georgia. He attended the William H. Spencer high school. Cleo Walker wrote of himself. [" In the last pre season game of the 1970 season Green Bay Vs Oakland @ Oakland. Then rookie Cleo Walker intercepted Kenny [ The Snake ] Stabler three times in the 4th Qtr. These steals not only sealed the game for Green Bay, but also assured Walker a place on the Green Bay Packers roster."

== Career ==
Walker was drafted by the Green Bay Packers in the seventh round of the 1970 NFL draft and played that season with the team. The following season, 1971, he played with the Atlanta Falcons. He later played in the World Football League, in 1974 for the Houston Texans (which later that year became the Shreveport Steamer), and in 1975 again for Shreveport (until the WFL folded in mid-season).

He played at the collegiate level at the University of Louisville. He played for the Cardinals from 1967 to 1970. After retiring from football, he worked as a comptroller for Ryder Trucks and then for the FBI.

In 2001 he was inducted to the Cardinals Athletics Hall of Fame.
