= Bart Starr =

American football player, coach, and executive (1934–2019)

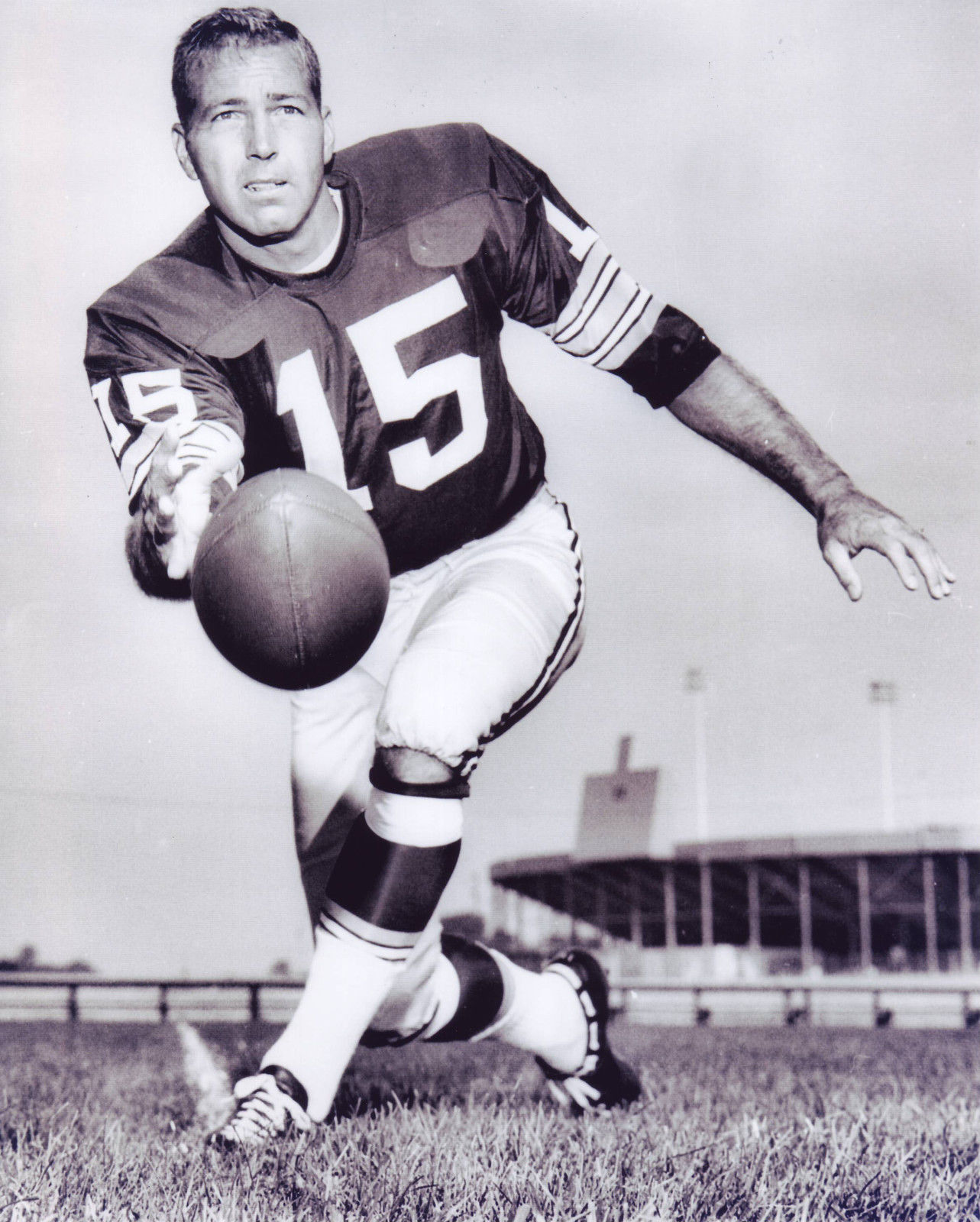
- Starr in the 1960s

No. 15
- Position: Quarterback

Personal information
- Born: January 9, 1934; Montgomery, Alabama, U.S.
- Died: May 26, 2019 (aged 85); Birmingham, Alabama, U.S.
- Listed height: 6 ft 1 in (1.85 m)
- Listed weight: 197 lb (89 kg)

Career information
- High school: Sidney Lanier (Montgomery)
- College: Alabama (1952–1955)
- NFL draft: 1956: 17th round, 200th overall pick

Career history

Playing
- Green Bay Packers (1956–1971)

Coaching
- Green Bay Packers (1972) Quarterbacks coach; Green Bay Packers (1975–1983) Head coach

Operations
- Green Bay Packers (1975–1980) General manager

Awards and highlights
- 2× Super Bowl champion (I, II); 2× Super Bowl MVP (I, II); 5× NFL champion (1961, 1962, 1965–1967); NFL Most Valuable Player (1966); First-team All-Pro (1966); 3× Second-team All-Pro (1961, 1962, 1964); 4× Pro Bowl (1960–1962, 1966); 4× NFL passer rating leader (1964, 1966, 1968, 1969); 4× NFL completion percentage leader (1962, 1966, 1968, 1969); NFL 1960s All-Decade Team; Green Bay Packers Hall of Fame; Green Bay Packers No. 15 retired

Career NFL statistics
- Passing attempts: 3,149
- Passing completions: 1,808
- Completion percentage: 57.4%
- TD–INT: 152–138
- Passing yards: 24,718
- Passer rating: 80.5
- Rushing yards: 1,308
- Rushing touchdowns: 15
- Stats at Pro Football Reference
- Coaching profile at Pro Football Reference
- Executive profile at Pro Football Reference
- Pro Football Hall of Fame

Bryan Bartlett Starr (January 9, 1934 – May 26, 2019) was an American professional football quarterback and head coach for the Green Bay Packers of the National Football League (NFL). He played college football for the Alabama Crimson Tide, and was selected in the 17th round of the 1956 NFL draft by the Packers, for whom he played for 16 seasons until 1971. Starr is the only quarterback in NFL history to lead a team to three consecutive league championships (1965–1967). He led his team to victories in the first two Super Bowls: I and II. As the Packers' head coach, he was less successful, compiling a 52–76–3 (.408) record from 1975 through 1983.

Starr was named the Most Valuable Player (MVP) of the first two Super Bowls and during his career earned four Pro Bowl selections. He won the league MVP (MVP) award in 1966. He was inducted into the Pro Football Hall of Fame and the Packers Hall of Fame in 1977. Starr has the third highest postseason passer rating (104.8), after Baker Mayfield (105.6) and Patrick Mahomes (105.4), of any quarterback in NFL history and a postseason record of 9–1. His career completion percentage of 57.4 was an NFL best when he retired in 1972. For 32 years (through the 2003 season), Starr also held the Packers' franchise record for games played (196).

== Early life ==
Starr was born and raised in Montgomery, Alabama to parents Benjamin Bryan Starr (1910–1985), a labor foreman with the state highway department, and Lula (Tucker) Starr (1916–1995). Starr's early life was marked by hardships. Shortly after the start of World War II, his father's reserve unit was activated and in 1942 he was deployed to the Pacific Theater. He was first in the U.S. Army but transferred to the U.S. Army Air Forces for his military career.

Starr had a younger brother, Hilton E. "Bubba" Starr. In 1946, Bubba stepped on a dog bone while playing in the yard and three days later died of tetanus. Starr's relationship with his father deteriorated after Hilton's death. He was an introverted child who rarely showed his emotions and his father pushed Starr to develop more of a mean streak.

Starr attended Sidney Lanier High School in Montgomery, and tried out for the football team in his sophomore year, but decided to quit after two weeks. His father gave him the option of playing football or working in the family garden; Starr chose to return to the football field.

In his junior year, the starting quarterback broke his leg and Starr became the starter. He led Lanier to an undefeated season. In his senior season, Starr was named all-state and All-American, and received college scholarship offers from universities across the country. He seriously considered the University of Kentucky, coached by Bear Bryant, where his idol, quarterback Babe Parilli, played. Starr's high school sweetheart, Cherry Louise Morton, was planning to attend Auburn and Starr wished to attend a college close to her. Starr changed his mind and committed to the University of Alabama.

== College career ==
During Starr’s freshman year at Alabama, the Southeastern Conference allowed freshmen to play varsity football. Starr did not start for Alabama as a freshman, but he did play enough minutes to earn a varsity letter. His high point of the season came in quarterback relief in the Orange Bowl, when he completed 8 of 12 passes for 93 yards and a touchdown against Syracuse.

Starr entered his sophomore year as Alabama's starting quarterback, safety and punter. His punting average of 41.4 yards per kick ranked second in the nation in 1953, behind Zeke Bratkowski. Alabama recorded a 6–2–3 record and lost in the Cotton Bowl to Rice by a score of 28–6. Starr completed 59 of 119 passes for 870 yards, with eight touchdowns that season.

In May 1954, Starr eloped with Cherry Morton. The couple chose to keep their marriage a secret. Colleges often revoked the scholarships of married athletes in the 1950s, believing their focus should remain on sports. Cherry remained in Jackson, Alabama, while Starr returned to the University of Alabama.

That summer, Starr suffered a severe back injury during a hazing incident for his initiation into the A Club. He covered up the cause by fabricating a story about being hurt while punting a football. He rarely played during his junior year due to the injury. The back injury disqualified him later from military service, and would occasionally bother him the rest of his football career. After a disappointing season of 4–5–2, Harold Drew was replaced by Jennings B. Whitworth as coach of Alabama.

Whitworth conducted a youth movement at Alabama for the 1955 season and only two seniors started for the team. Supposedly healed from the back injury, Starr rarely played in his senior season. Starr's decision to play football for Alabama rather than for Bear Bryant at the University of Kentucky did not sit well with Bryant, and four years later as head coach of the Blue–Gray Football Classic in 1955, Bryant hardly let Bart play at all.

Johnny Dee, the basketball coach at Alabama, was a friend of Jack Vainisi, the personnel director of the Green Bay Packers. Dee recommended Starr as a prospect to Vainisi. The Packers were convinced that Starr had the ability to succeed in the NFL and would learn quickly. In the 17th round of the 1956 NFL draft, Starr was selected by the Packers, with the 200th overall pick.

Starr spent the summer of 1956 living with his in-laws and throwing footballs through a tire in their backyard in order to prepare for his rookie season. The Packers offered $6,500 (equivalent to $59,000 in 2025) to sign Starr and he accepted, with the added condition, requested by Starr, that he receive $1,000 up front.

== Professional career ==
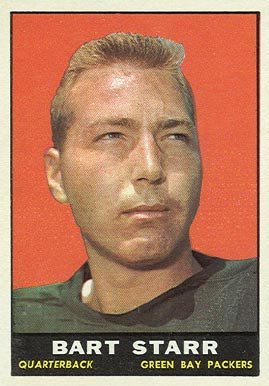
Starr in 1961

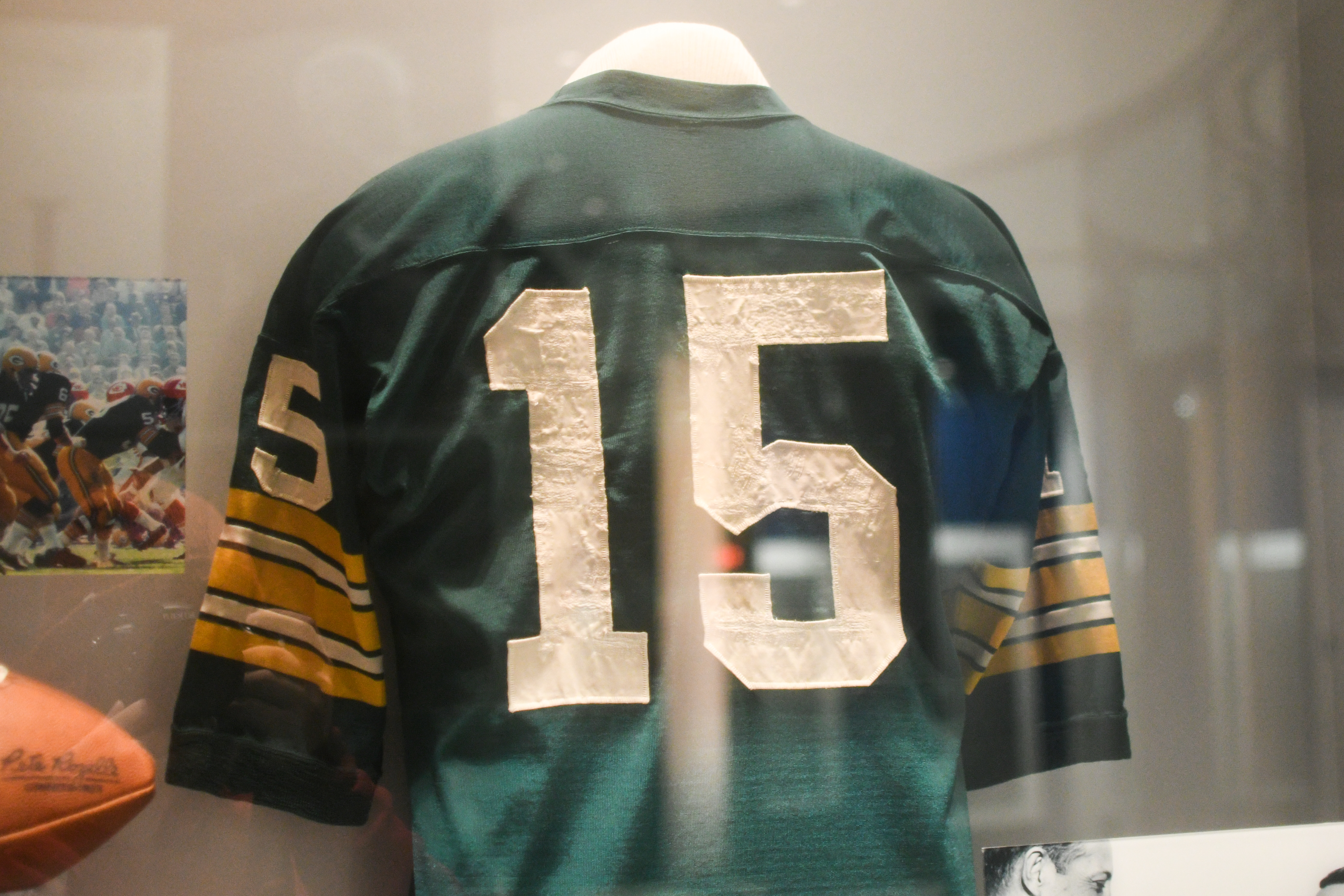
Starr's #15 uniform on display at the Pro Football Hall of Fame in Canton, Ohio

Starr began as a backup to Tobin Rote in 1956 and split time with Babe Parilli until 1959, Vince Lombardi's first year as the Packers head coach. In that season, Lombardi pulled starter Lamar McHan in favor of Starr, and he held the starting job henceforth. The following season, the Packers advanced to the 1960 NFL Championship Game, but lost to the Philadelphia Eagles in Lombardi's only post-season loss as a head coach.

The 1961 season was Starr's first season as a full-time starting quarterback for the Packers, throwing for over 2,400 yards and 16 touchdown passes, leading the Packers to an 11–3 record and a return to the NFL Championship Game, this time against the New York Giants. Starr threw for 164 yards and 3 touchdowns in a 37–0 Packers victory. Starr and the Packers continued their success in 1962, going 13–1. Even though Starr was not the focal point of the Packers' offense, which was the running duo of Jim Taylor and Paul Hornung, he still provided a solid passing attack, throwing for a career-high 2,438 yards and 14 touchdowns, leading the league with a completion percentage of 62.5. The Packers repeated as NFL champions, beating the Giants again in the NFL Championship Game, 16–7. While not as impressive with his passing in these earlier years of his career, Starr was responsible for calling plays on the Packers' offense (which was then the norm), proving to be an effective strategist on offense.

In 1963, the Packers fell short of qualifying for their fourth consecutive NFL Championship Game appearance, with injuries to Starr keeping him from finishing a few games. Even so, Starr still threw for 1,855 yards and 15 touchdowns. In 1964, with Jim Taylor and Paul Hornung struggling to continue their strong running game, Starr started to become more of the focus of the Packers' offensive attack. Vince Lombardi would help this shift by acquiring more capable pass catchers to the offense, trading for receiver Carroll Dale to join with Boyd Dowler and Max McGee, replacing tight end Ron Kramer with Marv Fleming, and drafting more pass-catching running backs in Elijah Pitts and Donny Anderson. With these new offensive weapons, Starr would put up his best passing seasons from 1964 to 1969. In 1964, despite the Packers only going 8–5–1, Starr threw for 2,144 yards, 15 touchdown passes, and only 4 interceptions. He led the league with a 97.1 passer rating.

In 1965, the Packers went 10–3–1, led by Starr's 2,055 passing yards and 16 touchdown passes, a career-high. The Packers and their Western Conference foe, the Baltimore Colts, finished the season with identical records, so the two teams met in a playoff game to determine the division winner. Starr was knocked out of the game after the first play when he suffered a rib injury from a hard hit, but the Packers managed to win in overtime, 13–10, led by Starr's backup, Zeke Bratkowski. Starr came back and started the 1965 NFL Championship Game against the Cleveland Browns. On a sloppy Lambeau field, the Packers went back to their classic backfield tandem of Taylor and Hornung, with the pair running for over 200 yards. Starr threw for only 147 yards, but that included a 47-yard touchdown pass to Carroll Dale in a 23–12 Packers victory.

In 1966, Starr had arguably the best season of his career, throwing for 2,257 yards, 14 touchdown passes, and only 3 interceptions. He led the NFL with a completion percentage of 62.2 and a 105 passer rating, while leading the Packers to a dominating 12–2 record. Starr would be named the NFL's Most Valuable Player by the Associated Press (AP), the Sporting News, the Newspaper Enterprise Association (NEA), and the UPI In the NFL Championship Game against the Dallas Cowboys, Starr had his best postseason performance, throwing for 304 yards and 4 touchdown passes, leading the Packers to a 34–27 victory, and the right to represent the NFL in the first ever Super Bowl, against the AFL champion Kansas City Chiefs. Starr had another solid game against the Chiefs, throwing for 250 yards and two touchdowns, both to Max McGee, in a decisive 35–10 Packers win. Starr was named the first-ever Super Bowl MVP for his performance.

1967 was a down year for Starr, especially when compared to his previous three seasons. Bothered by a hand injury for most of the season, Starr threw for only 1,823 yards and 9 touchdowns, with a career-high 17 interceptions thrown. Helped in large part by their defense, the Packers still finished 9–4–1, which was good enough for the Packers to reach the postseason. In the divisional playoff against the Los Angeles Rams, Starr was back in form, throwing for 222 yards and a touchdown pass in a 28–7 Packers triumph. This victory would set the stage for the infamous Ice Bowl against the Dallas Cowboys in the 1967 NFL Championship Game. At the end of the game, down by 3 points, the ball in the Packers' possession just inside the Cowboys' 1-yard line with 16 seconds left, during the Packers' final timeout, Starr consulted with Lombardi on the sideline and suggested a basic wedge play ― with a twist. Instead of handing off to Chuck Mercein as the play dictated (and unbeknownst to his teammates), Starr suggested running it in himself. Having enough of the bitterly cold weather, Lombardi said, "Then do it, and let's get the hell out of here!" Starr almost broke down in laughter as he ran back to the huddle, but held his composure. The quarterback sneak play worked and the Packers went on to beat the Cowboys 21–17. Even in the cold conditions, Starr was still able to throw for 191 yards in the Ice Bowl, with two touchdown passes to Boyd Dowler.

At the Orange Bowl in Miami, the Packers defeated the AFL champion Oakland Raiders 33–14 in Super Bowl II, Lombardi's final game as head coach of the Packers. Starr won his second consecutive Super Bowl MVP award for his performance, where he threw for 202 yards and a touchdown pass, a 62-yard strike to Boyd Dowler. The 1967 Packers remain the only team to win a third consecutive NFL title since the playoff system was instituted in 1933.

Starr had originally planned to retire after the second Super Bowl win in January 1968, but without a clear successor and new head coach, he stayed on. After Lombardi's departure, Starr continued to be a productive quarterback under new Packers coach Phil Bengtson, though injuries hampered him. Starr threw for 15 touchdown passes in 1968, leading the NFL once again in completion percentage (63.7) and passer rating (104.3). Starr struggled to stay healthy again in 1969, but still once again led the league with a 62.2 completion percentage and an 89.9 passer rating, though he only threw for 9 touchdowns and 1,161 yards. Starr was able to stay healthy for most of the entire 1970 season, but his age was showing, throwing for only 1,645 yards and 8 touchdowns, the last touchdown passes of his career. In an attempt to prolong his career, Starr had surgeries on his long-ailing throwing arm in July and August 1971. This nearly ended Starr's life, as the initial surgery was botched, nearly causing Starr to bleed to death. The surgeries ended up damaging the nerves in Starr's right arm, causing him to struggle to even grip a football, and while he stayed on the Packers' roster for the entire 1971 season, he only played in three games, usually with a glove on his throwing hand to try to regain his grip on the ball. In February 1972 Starr was set for one last year. He participated in the team's spring camp in Arizona in April, but his throwing shoulder and arm were no longer effective. Starr announced his retirement in July 1972 at age 38.

Starr's playing career ended with the 1971 season, having posted the fourth-best career passer rating of 80.5 (first at the time was Otto Graham with 86.6).

== Coaching career ==
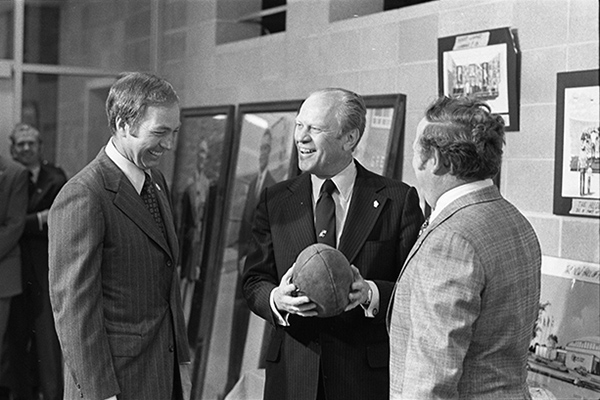
Starr with President Gerald Ford during the dedication of the Green Bay Packers Hall of Fame in 1976.

Immediately following his retirement as a player, Starr served as the Packers' quarterbacks coach and called plays in 1972 under head coach Dan Devine, when the Packers won the NFC Central division title at 10–4 with Scott Hunter under center. He pursued business interests and was then a broadcaster for CBS for two seasons. When Devine left for Notre Dame after the 1974 season, Starr was hired as head coach of the Packers on Christmas Eve. Upon taking the job, he recognized the long odds of a Hall of Fame player becoming a successful head coach. Initially given a three-year contract, he led the Packers for nine years, the first five as his own general manager.

His regular season record was a disappointing 52–76–2 (.408), with a playoff record of 1–1. Posting a 5–3–1 record in the strike-shortened season of 1982, Starr's Packers made their first playoff appearance in ten years (and their last for another 11 years). They defeated the St. Louis Cardinals 41–16 in the expanded wild card round of 16 teams on January 8, 1983–their first home playoff game since 1967. However, they then lost to the Dallas Cowboys 37–26 in the divisional round the following week. He tallied only three other non-losing seasons as Packers coach. After a disappointing 8–8 finish the following year, Starr was dismissed in favor of his former teammate Forrest Gregg, who previously led the Cincinnati Bengals to Super Bowl XVI in the 1981 season and had coached the Cleveland Browns prior to that.

On January 13, 1984, Starr was named the head coach of the Arizona Firebirds, a proposed expansion team for the NFL in Phoenix. The NFL never granted the would-be ownership group of the Firebirds a team (Phoenix would get the Cardinals in 1988).

== Career statistics ==
=== Playing career ===
Legend
	AP NFL MVP
	Super Bowl MVP
	Won the NFL championship
	Won the Super Bowl
	Led the league
**Bold**	Career high
Underline	Incomplete data

==== Regular season ====
Year	Team	Games			Passing									Rushing					Sacked		Fum
Year	Team	GP	GS	Record	Cmp	Att	Pct	Yds	Y/A	Lng	TD	Int	Rtg	Att	Yds	Y/A	Lng	TD	Sck	SckY	Fum
1956	GB	9	1	0–1	24	44	54.5	325	7.4	39	2	3	65.1	5	35	7.0	14	0	—	—	0
1957	GB	12	11	3–8	117	215	54.4	1,489	6.9	77	8	10	69.3	**31**	98	3.1	16	3	—	—	4
1958	GB	12	7	0–6–1	78	157	49.7	875	5.6	55	3	12	41.2	25	113	4.5	20	1	—	—	2
1959	GB	12	5	4–1	70	134	52.2	972	7.3	44	6	7	69.0	16	83	5.2	**39**	0	—	—	2
1960	GB	12	8	4–4	98	172	57.0	1,358	7.9	**91**	4	8	70.8	7	12	1.7	13	0	7	78	3
1961	GB	14	14	11–3	172	**295**	58.3	2,418	8.2	78	**16**	16	80.3	12	56	4.7	21	1	15	138	**8**
1962	GB	14	14	**13–1**	**178**	285	62.5	**2,438**	8.6	83	12	9	90.7	21	72	3.4	18	1	30	286	**8**
1963	GB	13	10	8–1–1	132	244	54.1	1,855	7.6	53	15	10	82.3	13	116	8.9	20	0	11	109	5
1964	GB	14	14	8–5–1	163	272	59.9	2,144	7.9	73	15	4	97.1	24	165	6.9	28	3	**43**	**332**	7
1965	GB	14	14	10–3–1	140	251	55.8	2,055	8.2	77	**16**	9	89.0	18	**169**	**9.4**	38	1	34	303	2
1966	GB	14	13	11–2	166	251	**66.1**	2,257	9.0	83	14	3	**108.3**	21	104	5.0	21	2	26	183	7
1967	GB	14	12	8–3–1	115	210	54.8	1,823	8.7	84	9	**17**	64.4	21	90	4.3	23	0	34	322	3
1968	GB	12	9	4–5	109	171	63.7	1,617	**9.5**	63	15	8	104.3	11	62	5.6	15	1	29	261	2
1969	GB	12	9	4–5	92	148	62.2	1,161	7.8	51	9	6	89.9	7	60	8.6	18	**4**	24	217	4
1970	GB	14	13	6–7	140	255	54.9	1,645	6.5	65	8	13	63.9	12	62	5.2	15	1	29	252	6
1971	GB	4	3	0–2–1	24	45	53.3	286	6.4	31	0	3	45.2	3	11	3.7	9	1	6	64	1
Career		196	157	94–57–6	1,808	3,149	57.4	24,718	7.8	91	152	138	80.5	247	1,308	5.3	39	15	288	2,545	64

==== Postseason ====
Year	Team	Games			Passing									Rushing					Sacked		Fum
Year	Team	GP	GS	Record	Cmp	Att	Pct	Yds	Y/A	Lng	TD	Int	Rtg	Att	Yds	Y/A	Lng	TD	Sck	SckY	Fum
1960	GB	1	1	0–1	21	34	61.8	178	5.2	20	1	0	85.2	1	0	0.0	0	0	0	0	0
1961	GB	1	1	1–0	10	17	58.8	164	9.6	37	3	0	130.9	0	0	—	0	0	0	0	0
1962	GB	1	1	1–0	9	21	42.9	85	4.0	17	0	0	54.7	1	4	4.0	4	0	1	10	0
1965	GB	2	2	2–0	11	19	57.9	157	8.3	47	1	**1**	80.4	0	0	—	0	0	3	19	0
1966	GB	2	2	2–0	35	51	**68.6**	554	**10.9**	51	**6**	**1**	**135.6**	2	–1	–0.5	0	0	8	61	0
1967	GB	3	3	**3–0**	**44**	**71**	62.0	**615**	8.7	**62**	4	**1**	102.7	**4**	**23**	**5.8**	**14**	**1**	**12**	**117**	**1**
Career		10	10	9–1	130	213	61.0	1,753	8.2	62	15	3	104.8	8	26	3.3	14	1	24	207	1

=== Head coaching record ===
Team	Year	Regular season					Postseason			
Team	Year	Won	Lost	Ties	Win %	Finish	Won	Lost	Win %	Result
GB	1975	4	10	0	.286	3rd in NFC Central	—	—	—	—
GB	1976	5	9	0	.357	4th in NFC Central	—	—	—	—
GB	1977	4	10	0	.286	4th in NFC Central	—	—	—	—
GB	1978	8	7	1	.531	2nd in NFC Central	—	—	—	—
GB	1979	5	11	0	.313	4th in NFC Central	—	—	—	—
GB	1980	5	10	1	.344	5th in NFC Central	—	—	—	—
GB	1981	8	8	0	.500	2nd in NFC Central	—	—	—	—
GB	1982	5	3	1	.611	**3rd in NFC**	1	1	.500	**Lost to Dallas Cowboys in NFC Second Round Game**
GB	1983	8	8	0	.500	2nd in NFC Central	—	—	—	—
Total		52	76	3	.408		1	1	.500	

== Honors ==
Starr's jersey #15 was permanently retired by the Packers in 1973

Starr was named to the NFL Pro Bowl four times. He was voted NFL Most Valuable Player by both AP and UPI in 1966, and was chosen Super Bowl MVP in 1966 and 1967. He was inducted into the Pro Football Hall of Fame in 1977.

He is one of six Green Bay Packers to have had his number (15) retired by the team. The others are Tony Canadeo (3), Don Hutson (14), Ray Nitschke (66), Reggie White (92), and Brett Favre (4).

On October 17, 1970, President Richard Nixon spoke at a testimonial reception honoring Bart Starr in the Brown County Veterans Memorial Arena in Green Bay, Wisconsin. "We honor him as a very great practitioner of his profession, the proud profession of professional football," Nixon said. "And as we honor him for that, we honor him not only for his technical skill but, as I've indicated, also for something that is just as important: his leadership qualities, his character, his moral fiber ... But I think the best way that I can present Bart Starr to his friends is to say very simply that the sixties will be described as the decade in which football became the number one sport in America, in which the Packers were the number one team, and Bart Starr was proudly the number one Packer."

In 1973, Starr received the Golden Plate Award of the American Academy of Achievement.

In 1977, Starr was inducted into the Green Bay Packers Hall of Fame. He was then elected to the Wisconsin Athletic Hall of Fame in 1981. In 1989, he was inducted into the National High School Hall of Fame.

Starr has an NFL award named after him. The Athletes in Action/Bart Starr Award is given annually, by a panel of judges, to an NFL player who best exemplifies outstanding character and leadership in the home, on the field, and in the community.

There is a Bart Starr Street in San Antonio, Texas.

== Style of play ==
Vince Lombardi's tenure as head coach of the Packers was marked by the smashmouth offense. Lombardi's extensive use of the Packers sweep did not allow for high volume passing. Due to this, Starr typically assumed the role of game manager and did not generate the volume statistics of his contemporaries in more pass-heavy offenses, such as Johnny Unitas and Sonny Jurgensen. Despite lacking in volume, Starr was remarkably efficient during his tenure with the Packers, leading the NFL in passer rating four times (1964, 1966, 1968, 1969) and completion percentage four times (1962, 1966, 1968, 1969). Starr was also an exceptional playoff quarterback, completing 61% of his passes, throwing just 3 interceptions, and recording a 104.8 passer rating in ten career playoff games.

== Personal life ==
Starr and his wife Cherry were married for more than 60 years. They had two sons, of whom the younger, Bret, is deceased (1988, age 24, drug overdose), and three granddaughters.

Starr was a Christian. He had said, "... Jesus was the ultimate role model for me. Regardless of the successes I have experienced, if my life does not exhibit God’s love, it becomes less meaningful".

In 1965, Starr and Cherry helped co-found Rawhide Boys Ranch in New London, Wisconsin, a facility designed to help at-risk and troubled boys throughout the state of Wisconsin. Starr even donated the Corvette he received as MVP of Super Bowl II to help Rawhide during their early years. He was affiliated with Rawhide Boys Ranch until his death.

In 1971, Starr and his wife Cherry helped start the Vince Lombardi Cancer Foundation raising funds for cancer research and care in honor of his late coach, Vince Lombardi. They were active at all their events throughout the years. He and Cherry launched the Starr Children's Fund within the Vince Lombardi Cancer Foundation to continue their legacy of work supporting pediatric cancer research and care.

During his latter years, Starr suffered a number of physical ailments, including an ischemic stroke, hemorrhagic stroke, a mild heart attack, seizures, and a broken hip. In June 2015, Starr's family reported that he was undergoing stem-cell therapy in a clinical trial. He managed to attend a ceremony at Lambeau Field on November 26, 2015, retiring QB Brett Favre's jersey number, and a fall 2017 reunion of the Ice Bowl Packers. At Super Bowl 50 in February 2016, the NFL held a pregame ceremony honoring the MVPs of all 49 Super Bowls. Although he wished to attend, Starr was not well enough to travel to the game and instead sent a videotaped greeting from home.

Starr died on May 26, 2019, at the age of 85, in Birmingham, Alabama, after a period of failing health caused by a serious stroke he suffered in 2014.
