= Perry Smith (American football) =

American football player (born 1951)

No. 45
- Position: Cornerback

Personal information
- Born: March 29, 1951 (age 75); Spartanburg, South Carolina, U.S.
- Listed height: 6 ft 1 in (1.85 m)
- Listed weight: 195 lb (88 kg)

Career information
- High school: Lincoln
- College: Mesa (CO); Colorado State
- NFL draft: 1973: 4th round, 92nd overall pick

Career history
- Green Bay Packers (1973–1976); St. Louis Cardinals (1977–1979); Denver Broncos (1980–1981)

Career NFL statistics
- Interceptions: 13
- Fumble recoveries: 3
- Stats at Pro Football Reference

Ealthon Perry Smith (born March 29, 1951) is an American former professional football player who was a cornerback for nine seasons in the National Football League (NFL). Smith was a fourth round selection (92nd overall pick) in the 1973 NFL draft by the Oakland Raiders after playing college football for the Colorado State Rams. He would play for the Green Bay Packers (1973–1976), St. Louis Cardinals (1977–1979), and Denver Broncos (1980–1981).
