= Larry Hefner =

American football player (born 1949)

No. 28, 51
- Position: Linebacker

Personal information
- Born: August 2, 1949 (age 77); Charlotte, North Carolina, U.S.
- Listed height: 6 ft 2 in (1.88 m)
- Listed weight: 230 lb (104 kg)

Career information
- High school: North Mecklenburg (Huntersville, North Carolina)
- College: Clemson (1967–1971)
- NFL draft: 1972: 14th round, 346th overall pick

Career history
- Green Bay Packers (1972–1975)

Awards and highlights
- First-team All-ACC (1971)

Career NFL statistics
- Games played: 34
- Interceptions: 1
- Fumble recoveries: 2
- Stats at Pro Football Reference

Larry Douglas Hefner (born August 2, 1949) is an American former professional football player who was a linebacker for four seasons with the Green Bay Packers of the National Football League (NFL). He played college football for the Clemson Tigers and was selected by the Packers in the 14th round of the 1972 NFL draft.

== Early life ==
Hefner was born on August 2, 1949, in Charlotte, North Carolina, and grew up there. He played football in the Pop Warner Little Scholars program and later played while attending North Mecklenburg High School. He was North Mecklenberg's second NFL alumni and was a two-way player for the school, being a linebacker on defense while on offense a guard. He was regarded as one of the best linebackers in his county in the 1966 season and was co-team captain, being named The Charlotte News All-State and All-Mecklenberg. Hefner was also invited to the East–West All-Star Game. His coach said of him: "I've never coached a better lineman than Larry." He committed to play college football for the Clemson Tigers in December 1966.

== College career ==
Hefner joined the Tigers in 1967, spending that season on their freshman squad. Playing linebacker, he was their leading tackler despite missing a game. He was unable to play in 1968 due to a thyroid condition but returned for the 1969 season. He lettered in 1969 and became a starter. He returned as a starter for his junior year in 1970; that season, he weighed at 208 pounds (94 kg) and ran the 40-yard dash in 5.0 seconds. He increased his weight to 235 pounds (107 kg) and improved his 40-yard dash time to 4.85 by his senior season in 1971. He was a top player for the team that year, being described by The News & Observer as the "anvil" of the defense; the paper noted that he "jars running backs with some Dick Butkus-like jolts." Clemson head coach Hootie Ingram called Hefner "as fine a linebacker as I've ever been associated with." At the end of the season, he was selected All-Atlantic Coast Conference (ACC).

== Professional career ==
Hefner was selected in the 14th round (346th overall) of the 1972 NFL draft by the Green Bay Packers. He had played middle linebacker in college but moved to the outside with the Packers. He was put on the taxi squad to begin the season but later was promoted and saw action in two regular season games as well as one playoff game. He made his NFL debut against the Minnesota Vikings in Week 13 and was mainly used on special teams. He returned to playing middle linebacker in the 1973 season and served as a backup to Jim Carter, appearing in 14 games while posting one interception and a fumble recovery as the Packers went 5–7–2. In 1974, Hefner played all 14 games, one as a starter, and helped the Packers compile a record of 6–8 while recovering one fumble and returning one punt. He appeared in the first four games of the 1975 season, two as a starter, before suffering a knee injury which resulted in him missing the rest of the season. He retired prior to the 1976 season due to his knee injury.

== Personal and later life ==
Hefner was married and had two children as of 1976. After his football career, he worked as a pit crew member for NASCAR racers. He also worked in the restaurant business.
