= Leland Glass =

American football player (born 1950)

No. 46
- Position: Wide receiver

Personal information
- Born: November 5, 1950 (age 76); Sacramento, California, U.S.
- Listed height: 6 ft 0 in (1.83 m)
- Listed weight: 185 lb (84 kg)

Career information
- High school: Sacramento
- College: Oregon
- NFL draft: 1972: 8th round, 190th overall pick

Career history
- Green Bay Packers (1972–1973)

Career NFL statistics
- Receptions: 26
- Receiving yards: 380
- Touchdowns: 1
- Stats at Pro Football Reference

Leland Glass (born November 5, 1950) is an American former professional football player who was a wide receiver in the National Football League (NFL) for the Green Bay Packers. He played college football for the Oregon Ducks and was selected by the Packers in the eighth round of the 1972 NFL draft.

== Biography ==
Glass was born Leland Strother Glass in Sacramento, California. He married his wife Cheryl in 1974, and they have two children: Uumoiya and Monique. Uumoiya played one season of college football at Arizona State University and is now eCommerce Manager at Universal Music Group and owner of Brownglass Entertainment. After his retirement from the NFL, Leland Glass worked as a high school coach and as a personal trainer.

== College career ==
Glass played from 1969 to 1971 at the University of Oregon. in his senior season, he led the Pacific-8 Conference with six touchdown receptions. His 46 receptions were good for second in the conference. His college teammates included future National Football League stars Bobby Moore (later named Ahmad Rashad) and Hall of Fame quarterback Dan Fouts.

== Professional career ==
Glass was selected by the Green Bay Packers in the eighth round of the 1972 NFL draft with the 190th overall pick. He played two seasons with the team, wearing number 46. His rookie season of 1972, in which he started all 14 Packers regular season games, was his most productive. His 15 receptions and 261 yards receiving were good for second place among Packers wide receivers to Carroll Dale, and both numbers ranked fourth on the team. in 1973, his playing time and production decreased, losing playing time at wide receiver to Jon Staggers and 1973 first round draft pick Barry Smith. Glass finished 1973 in sixth place in both receptions and yardage on the Packers. A knee injury ended his pro career.
