= Bob Brown (defensive lineman) =

American football player (1940–1998)

No. 78
- Position: Defensive end Defensive tackle

Personal information
- Born: February 23, 1939; Bonita, Louisiana, U.S.
- Died: December 10, 1998 (aged 58); Memphis, Tennessee, U.S.
- Listed height: 6 ft 5 in (1.96 m)
- Listed weight: 260 lb (118 kg)

Career information
- High school: Morehouse (LA)
- College: Arkansas AM&N
- NFL draft: 1964: 13th round, 169th overall pick

Career history
- San Francisco 49ers (1964)*; Green Bay Packers (1966–1973); San Diego Chargers (1974); Cincinnati Bengals (1975–1976)
- * Offseason or practice squad member only

Awards and highlights
- 2× Super Bowl champion (I, II); Pro Bowl (1972)
- Stats at Pro Football Reference

Robert Eddie Brown (February 23, 1939 – December 10, 1998) was an American professional football defensive end who played for the Green Bay Packers, San Diego Chargers, and Cincinnati Bengals of the National Football League (NFL) in an eleven-year career that lasted from 1966 to 1976.
