= Bill Lueck =

American football player (born 1946)

No. 62
- Position: Guard

Personal information
- Born: April 7, 1946 (age 80); Buckeye, Arizona, U.S.
- Listed height: 6 ft 3 in (1.91 m)
- Listed weight: 250 lb (113 kg)

Career information
- High school: Agua Fria (Avondale, Arizona)
- College: Arizona (1964-1967)
- NFL draft: 1968: 1st round, 26th overall pick

Career history
- Green Bay Packers (1968–1974); Philadelphia Eagles (1975)

Career NFL statistics
- Games played: 101
- Games started: 87
- Fumble recoveries: 1
- Stats at Pro Football Reference

William Lueck (born April 7, 1946) is an American former professional football player who was a guard in the National Football League (NFL). He played 98 games for the Green Bay Packers and 11 games for the Philadelphia Eagles.

Lueck played college football for the Arizona Wildcats and was selected in the first round with the 26th overall pick of the 1968 NFL/AFL draft. He played eight seasons in the NFL, and retired prior to the 1976 season. When hall of famer Jerry Kramer retired after the 1968 season, Lueck succeeded him at right guard for the Packers in 1969.

Lueck's brother Bob Lueck was also a football player, playing in the Canadian Football League for the Calgary Stampeders and Winnipeg Blue Bombers. His grandson Matteo Mele played football for the Washington Huskies.
