= Charlie Hall (defensive back) =

American football player (1948–1998)

No. 21, 44
- Position: Defensive back

Personal information
- Born: March 31, 1948; Philadelphia, Pennsylvania, U.S.
- Died: May 14, 1998 (aged 50); Orangeburg, South Carolina, U.S.
- Listed height: 6 ft 1 in (1.85 m)
- Listed weight: 190 lb (86 kg)

Career information
- High school: Lower Merion (Pennsylvania)
- College: Pittsburgh
- NFL draft: 1971: 3rd round, 62nd overall pick

Career history
- Green Bay Packers (1971–1976)

Career NFL statistics
- Games played: 83
- Interceptions: 2
- Fumble recoveries: 1
- Stats at Pro Football Reference

Charles Val Hall Jr. (March 31, 1948 – May 14, 1998) was a National Football League defensive back who played his entire career for the Green Bay Packers. Hall was born in Philadelphia, Pennsylvania, where he attended Lower Merion High School. He played football at Lower Merion, where he set various records, including rushing for 250 yards in a game, scoring 5 touchdowns in a game and average 8.6 yards per rush over an entire season. After high school, he attended the University of Pittsburgh where he played for the Pittsburgh Panthers football team. Going into college, Hall started as a halfback on offense but was moved during his first year to defensive back because of a shortage of players at that position. During his second year, he became a starter, a position he would not relinquish for the rest of his college career.

Hall was drafted by the Green Bay Packers in the third round of the 1971 NFL draft. He played in 83 games for the Packers over six seasons, recording two interceptions and one fumble recovery. During his time with the Packers, he developed a reputation for being aggressive and a hard hitter, while primarily filling a utility role for the Packers defense. Sometime in 1994, Hall had a heart attack and required angioplasty surgery. Four years later, on May 18, 1998, he had another heart attack and died at the age of 50.
