= Bob Kroll (American football) =

American football player (born 1950)

No. 44
- Position: Cornerback

Personal information
- Born: June 9, 1950 (age 76); Green Bay, Wisconsin, U.S.
- Listed height: 6 ft 1 in (1.85 m)
- Listed weight: 195 lb (88 kg)

Career information
- High school: Preble (Green Bay)
- College: Northern Michigan
- NFL draft: 1972: undrafted

Career history
- Green Bay Packers (1972)

Awards and highlights
- Third-team Little All-American (1971)

Career NFL statistics
- Games played: 5
- Fumble recoveries: 1
- Stats at Pro Football Reference

Robert Lee Kroll (born June 9, 1950) is an American former professional football player who was a cornerback for one season with the Green Bay Packers of the National Football League (NFL) in 1972. Kroll played college football for the Northern Michigan Wildcats.

While playing football at Northern Michigan University in 1971, Kroll tied the NCAA single-season Division I interception record of 13 and was named an All-American. He now resides in Florida.
