= Larry Krause =

American football player (born 1948)

No. 30
- Position: Running back

Personal information
- Born: April 22, 1948 (age 78); Stanley, Wisconsin, U.S.
- Listed height: 6 ft 0 in (1.83 m)
- Listed weight: 208 lb (94 kg)

Career information
- High school: Greenwood
- College: St. Norbert
- NFL draft: 1970: 17th round, 432nd overall pick

Career history
- Green Bay Packers (1970–1974)

Career NFL statistics
- Rushing attempts: 6
- Rushing yards: 15
- Total TDs: 1
- Stats at Pro Football Reference

Larry Krause is a former player in the National Football League (NFL) for the Green Bay Packers from 1970 to 1974 as a running back. He played at the collegiate level at St. Norbert College. He was drafted by the Green Bay Packers in the 17th round (432nd overall) of the 1970 NFL Draft.

== Biography ==
Krause was born on April 22, 1948, in Stanley, Wisconsin.
