= Keith Wortman =

American football player (born 1950)

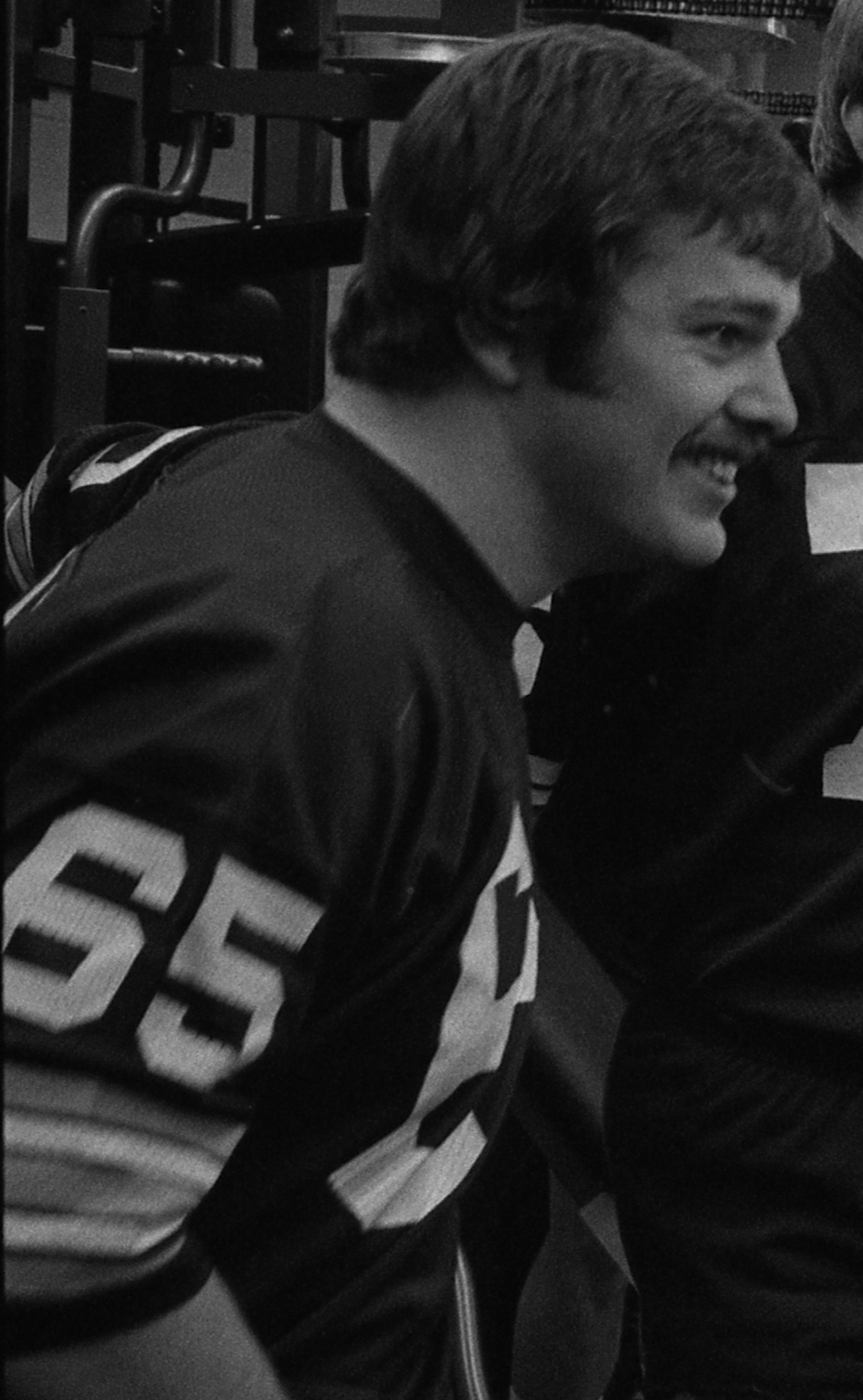
- Wortman with the Green Bay Packers in 1976

No. 65, 62
- Positions: Tackle, Guard, Center

Personal information
- Born: July 20, 1950 (age 76); Billings, Montana, U.S.
- Listed height: 6 ft 2 in (1.88 m)
- Listed weight: 260 lb (118 kg)

Career information
- High school: Whittier
- College: Nebraska
- NFL draft: 1972: 10th round, 242nd overall pick

Career history
- Green Bay Packers (1972–1975); St. Louis Cardinals (1976–1981)

Awards and highlights
- 2× National champion (1970, 1971)

Career NFL statistics
- Games played: 96
- Games started: 49
- Fumble recoveries: 3
- Stats at Pro Football Reference

Keith Delane Wortman (born July 20, 1950) is a former offensive lineman who played ten professional seasons in the National Football League (NFL). Wortman attended the University of Nebraska–Lincoln. He attended California High School from 1965 to 1968.
