= Mike McCoy (defensive tackle) =

American football player (born 1948)

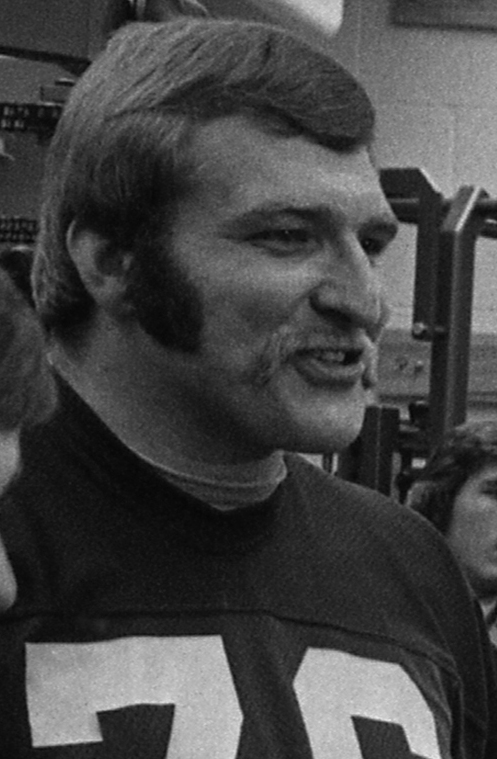
- McCoy with the Green Bay Packers in 1976

No. 76, 79, 63, 77
- Position: Defensive tackle

Personal information
- Born: September 6, 1948 (age 78); Erie, Pennsylvania, U.S.
- Listed height: 6 ft 5 in (1.96 m)
- Listed weight: 284 lb (129 kg)

Career information
- High school: Cathedral Prep (Erie)
- College: Notre Dame (1966–1969)
- NFL draft: 1970: 1st round, 2nd overall pick

Career history
- Green Bay Packers (1970–1976); Oakland Raiders (1977–1978); New York Giants (1979–1980); Detroit Lions (1980)

Awards and highlights
- UPI Lineman of the Year (1969); Unanimous All-American (1969)

Career NFL statistics
- Games played: 132
- Interceptions: 1
- Fumble recoveries: 16
- TDs: 1
- Stats at Pro Football Reference

Michael Patrick McCoy (born September 6, 1948) is an American former professional football player. He played in the National Football League (NFL) for the Green Bay Packers, the Oakland Raiders, the New York Giants, and the Detroit Lions.

== College career ==
McCoy is a native of Erie, Pennsylvania and a graduate of Cathedral Preparatory School. He graduated from the University of Notre Dame with a BA in Economics where he played football and was a Consensus All-American. He was named Lineman of the Year by the Associated Press and was sixth in the Heisman Trophy balloting his senior year.

== Professional career ==
He was the first pick of the Green Bay Packers and the second player overall (second only to Terry Bradshaw) selected in the 1970 NFL draft. McCoy was named Packers Rookie of the Year in 1970 and led the Packers in quarterback sacks in 1973 and 1976.

He played eleven years in the NFL – seven with Green Bay, two with the Oakland Raiders, two with the New York Giants, and a couple of games with the Detroit Lions.

== Awards ==
Mike received many awards including the Packers Rookie of the Year, Packers Dodge NFL Man of the Year, the Catholic College Player of the Year, Notre Dame Pro Player of the Year, and induction into the Erie, PA Pro Hall of Fame, Cathedral Prep Hall of Fame and the Pennsylvania Sports Hall of Fame. Mike is a recipient of the Harvey Foster Humanitarian Award by the University of Notre Dame Alumni Association. Mike was also awarded the Bronko Nagurski Legends award which recognized the best defensive football players in the last 40 years. McCoy was inducted on June 20, 2019, into the National Polish-American Sports Hall of Fame in Troy, Michigan.

== Civic activities ==
McCoy was appointed by President Ronald Reagan to the Council on Sports for a Drug Free America and by former Pennsylvania Governor Dick Thornburgh to the Pennsylvania Council for Physical Fitness. McCoy served as the chaplain of the Atlanta Braves and currently serves on several community outreach boards. Mike served on the Board of Directors of YMCA Camp High Harbour, Camp Hope in Georgia, Pro Athletes Outreach and Wisconsin Special Olympics.

== Mike McCoy Ministries ==
Mike now lectures on the importance of good decision-making, fighting drug addiction, and empowering youth. Mike is President of Mike McCoy Ministries. He speaks primarily in Catholic Schools across America, but he has spoken in many other types of schools too. He has also been a speaker for the National Catholic Educators Convention, Catholic Men’s Rallies, Bill Glass Ministries in prisons, and to parents and coaches through the Notre Dame Play Like a Champion program. He also spoke at one of the Billy Graham Crusades.

== Personal life ==
Mike lives in Ponte Vedra Beach, Florida; his wife Kia died from cancer in 2012 and he remarried in 2014 and is the father of four children and the grandfather of fourteen. One of his children played American Football with the Grenoble's Centaurs in France.
