= Dick Himes =

American football player (1946–2026)

No. 72
- Position: Offensive tackle

Personal information
- Born: May 25, 1946; Canton, Ohio, U.S.
- Died: July 5, 2026 (aged 80); Luxemburg, Wisconsin, U.S.
- Listed height: 6 ft 4 in (1.93 m)
- Listed weight: 244 lb (111 kg)

Career information
- High school: Canton South
- College: Ohio State
- NFL draft: 1968: 3rd round, 81st overall pick

Career history
- Green Bay Packers (1968–1977)

Awards and highlights
- Third-team All-American (1967); 2× First-team All-Big Ten (1966, 1967)

Career NFL statistics
- Games played: 135
- Games started: 104
- Fumble recoveries: 3
- Stats at Pro Football Reference

Richard Dean Himes (May 25, 1946 – July 5, 2026) was an American professional football player who spent his entire career as an offensive tackle for the Green Bay Packers of the National Football League (NFL). He played college football for the Ohio State Buckeyes.

== Biography ==
Himes was born in Canton, Ohio, where he attended Canton South High School. At Canton South, Himes was named Associated Press lineman of the year during his senior year. Before that, he was named an all-state selection twice at the offensive end position. After high school, he attended Ohio State University, where he started for three years along the offensive and defensive lines. He was named All-Big Ten twice, at two different positions.

He was selected 81st overall in the third round of the 1968 NFL draft by the Green Bay Packers and ended up playing for the team from 1968 to 1977. He played a total of 135 games during his 10 seasons, starting 104 of those games. He became a starter in 1970 and was a mainstay at the right tackle position until he was replaced by Greg Koch in 1977. The Packers tried to trade Himes, but with no other teams expressing interest, he was ultimately released. Packers' historian Cliff Christl noted that Himes lacked proper recognition for his accomplishments because he played for bad Packers teams under poor leadership. Himes, according to Christl, had "good feet" and was a "good athlete" that "had the versatility to be comparably efficient as a drive blocker and a pass protector".

Himes died from complications of Parkinson's disease at home in Luxemburg, Wisconsin, on July 5, 2026, at the age of 80.
