= Al Matthews (American football) =

American football player (1947–2025)

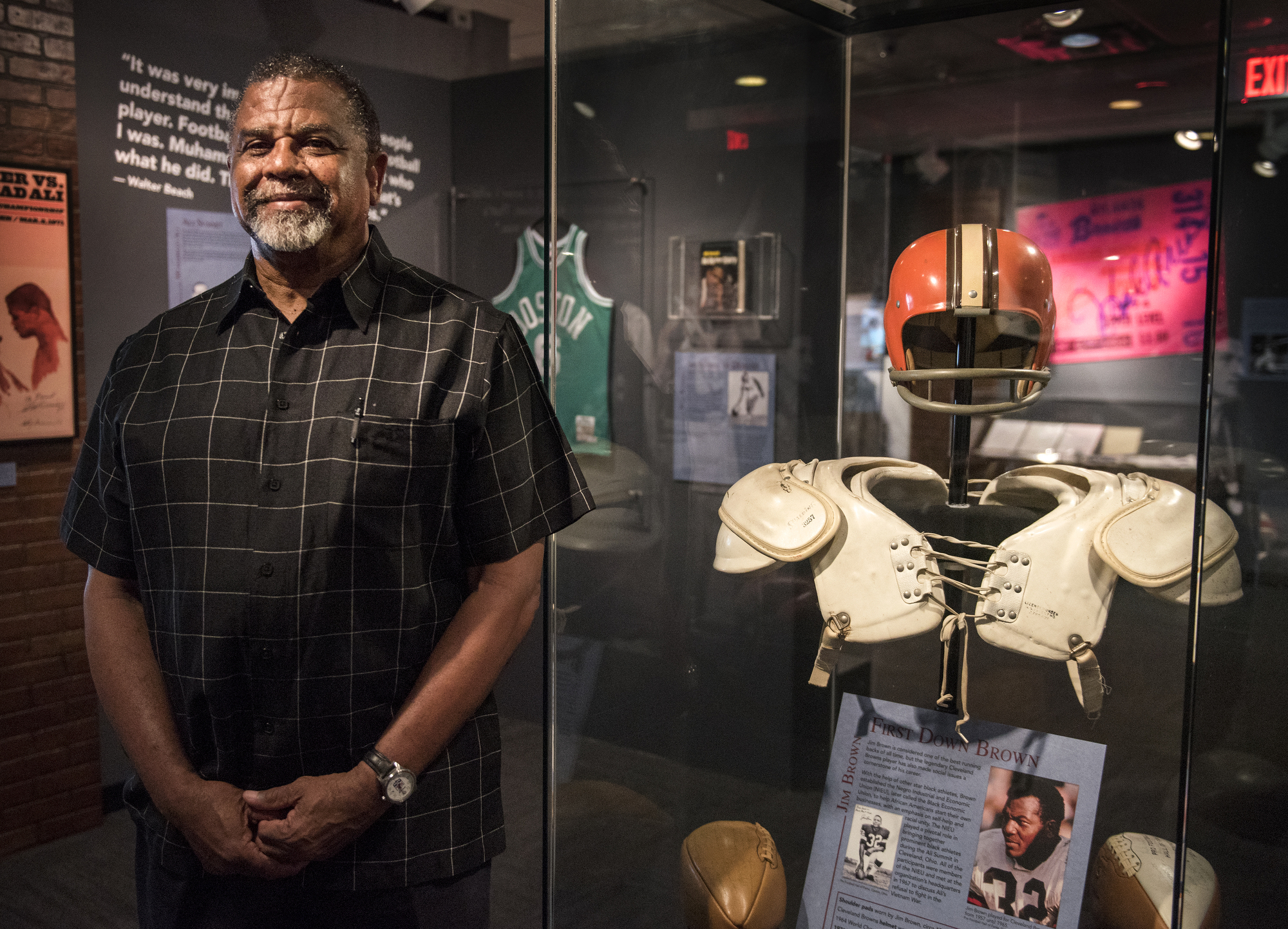

No. 29, 47
- Position: Safety

Personal information
- Born: November 7, 1947; Austin, Texas, U.S.
- Died: March 8, 2025 (aged 77); Austin, Texas, U.S.
- Listed height: 5 ft 11 in (1.80 m)
- Listed weight: 190 lb (86 kg)

Career information
- High school: Stephen F. Austin
- College: Texas A&I (1966-1969)
- NFL draft: 1970: 2nd round, 41st overall pick

Career history
- Green Bay Packers (1970–1975); Seattle Seahawks (1976); San Francisco 49ers (1977)

Career NFL statistics
- Interceptions: 13
- Fumble recoveries: 7
- Defensive touchdowns: 2
- Stats at Pro Football Reference

Alvin Leon Matthews (November 7, 1947 – March 8, 2025) was an American professional football player who was a safety for eight seasons in the National Football League (NFL) from 1970 to 1977 for the Green Bay Packers, Seattle Seahawks and San Francisco 49ers. He played college football for the Texas A&I Javelinas, at the time a football power in the National Association of Intercollegiate Athletics (NAIA).

Matthews died at the age of 77 on March 8, 2025.

== See also ==
- 1969 Little All-America college football team
