= Jim Carter (American football) =

American football player (1948–2023)

No. 50
- Position: Linebacker

Personal information
- Born: October 18, 1948; St. Paul, Minnesota, U.S.
- Died: November 23, 2023 (aged 75)
- Listed height: 6 ft 3 in (1.91 m)
- Listed weight: 235 lb (107 kg)

Career information
- High school: South St. Paul (South St. Paul, Minnesota)
- College: Minnesota
- NFL draft: 1970: 3rd round, 68th overall pick

Career history
- Green Bay Packers (1970–1978)

Awards and highlights
- Pro Bowl (1973); Second-team All-Big Ten (1969)

Career NFL statistics
- Interceptions: 6
- Fumble recoveries: 7
- Defensive TDs: 1
- Stats at Pro Football Reference

James Charles Carter (October 18, 1948 – November 23, 2023) was an American professional football player who was a linebacker for the Green Bay Packers of the National Football League (NFL) from 1970 through 1978. He attended South Saint Paul High School and played college football for the Minnesota Golden Gophers.

Carter was a 10 letterman in high school and played hockey, football, and baseball, gaining All-America recognition in football and hockey.

At the University of Minnesota, Carter was a fullback on the 1967 Golden Gophers team that was Co-Big Ten Champion; he captained the 1969 Gopher team and led the team in scoring. In addition to being a 3-year starter in football, Carter played two years of varsity hockey for the Golden Gophers and was later drafted by the St. Paul Fighting Saints. He decided to pursue a football career rather than hockey and he was drafted in the 3rd round by the Green Bay Packers in the 1970 NFL draft. Although he played only on offense in college, the Packers drafted Jim to play linebacker. He signed with Green Bay and played 9 seasons for the Packers and was defensive captain from 1973 through 1976. He was selected to play middle linebacker for the NFC in the Pro Bowl after the 1973 season.

Jim Carter is in the University of Minnesota Hall of Fame, the South St. Paul Sports Hall of Fame, the Mancini’s (St. Paul) Hall of Fame, and the Minnesota Old Timer’s Football Association Hall of Fame.

After retiring from the Packers, Carter bought a struggling Ford dealership in Eau Claire, WI. He commenced operating Jim Carter Ford in February 1980. After building the dealership back to profitability and respectability, Carter went on to acquire numerous other automotive businesses around Wisconsin: Bob Johnson Chevrolet-Mazda in Wausau, Car City Honda in Chippewa Falls, Borum-Dyer Volkswagen-Audi in Eau Claire, and Ken Loesch Cadillac-Pontiac-Oldsmobile in Chippewa Falls. He branded them all with his name and operated award-winning dealerships for 25+ years. He was named the Greater Eau Claire Area Small Businessman of the Year in 1987 by the Eau Claire Chamber of Commerce; he was named Wisconsin Dealer of the Year in 1988 by the Wisconsin Auto and Truck Dealer’s Association; he was one of the five national finalists for the Time Magazine Quality Dealer of the Year in 1988. Carter sold all the dealership operations to his long time manager (and protege), Keith Kocourek, in 2005.

While operating his businesses, Carter was active in his communities. He served on the board of directors of the Greater Eau Claire Area Chamber of Commerce and was president of the organization in 1990; he served on the board of directors of the Wisconsin Auto and Truck Dealers Association; he served on the board of directors of the Frank Lloyd Wright Foundation in Chicago, IL.; he also served on the board of directors of the environmental organization, Clean Wisconsin.

Carter was a finalist for a position on the University of Minnesota Board of Regents when issue was made of a publicized incident of sexual harassment during his NFL playing days in 1976. While admitting it was "bad behavior" that led to a lawsuit by the victim, Carter accused university leaders of waging a smear campaign against him; Carter had been critical of the University's strict punishment of players accused of sexual assault. "Carter said he does not condone sexual assault but simply backed the players' call for changes in how the university investigates assault allegations."

Carter was very active in his addiction Recovery community. He was a regular at many recovery meetings and sponsored many fellow addicts.

Carter died at his home on November 23, 2023, at the age of 75. He was survived by his wife, Victoria.
