= 1976 Seattle Seahawks season =

American football team season

- Owner: The Nordstrom family
- General manager: John Thompson
- Head coach: Jack Patera
- Home stadium: Kingdome

Results
- Record: 2–12
- Division place: 5th NFC West
- Playoffs: Did not qualify
- All-Pros: None
- Pro Bowlers: None

The 1976 season was the Seattle Seahawks' 1st in the National Football League (NFL), This season was also the team's only one in the NFC until the league realigned divisions before the 2002 season, at which point the Seahawks were once again placed in the NFC West. The Seahawks obtained a future Pro Football Hall of Fame inductee from the Houston Oilers, who had drafted receiver Steve Largent in the 4th round in 1976. Largent would go on to be a first-ballot Hall-of-Fame wide receiver, playing in seven Pro Bowls, recorded over 13,000 receiving yards and score 100 touchdowns in a 14-year career with the Seahawks.

However, before the Seahawks even played their first game, tragedy struck, as the team's owner Lloyd W. Nordstrom died from a heart attack while vacationing in Mexico on January 20. Nordstrom had been instrumental in landing an NFL team in the Pacific Northwest, and hiring the front office, but he never had a chance to see his team take the field. The estate of Mr. Nordstrom would oversee the team (with Lloyd's son Elmer being chairman), with co-owner Herman Sarkowsky serving as the team's first chief operating officer.

The Seahawks, coached by Jack Patera, played their first preseason game against the San Francisco 49ers on August 1, and their first regular season game came on September 12 at the sold-out Kingdome. The Seahawks played a solid game, but had their desperation final pass intercepted in the endzone in a 30–24 loss to the St. Louis Cardinals. The Seahawks would go on to lose their first five games, before beating the Tampa Bay Buccaneers, their brothers in expansion, 13–10 in Tampa on October 17. Three weeks later, the Seahawks would earn their first (and only for that season) home victory by beating the Atlanta Falcons 30–13 behind the 124-yard effort of running back Sherman Smith. These two wins would be the only ones for the season, as the first-year team compiled a record of 2–12, making them the worst team in the NFC, although this was nevertheless better than their expansion cousins the Tampa Bay Buccaneers, who went 0–14 in the AFC.

== Draft ==
1976 Seattle Seahawks draft
Round	Pick	Player	Position	College	Notes
1	2	Steve Niehaus	Defensive tackle	Notre Dame	
2	29	Sammy Green	Linebacker	Florida	
2	58	Sherman Smith	Running back	Miami (OH)	
2	59	Steve Raible	Wide receiver	Georgia Tech	
3	62	Jeff Lloyd	Defensive end	West Texas State	
3	89	Rick Engles	Punter	Tulsa	
3	92	Don Bitterlich	Kicker	Temple	
4	93	Steve Myer	Quarterback	New Mexico	
4	122	Randy Johnson	Guard	Georgia	
4	123	Andy Bolton	Running back	Fisk	
5	126	Don Dufek	Safety	Michigan	
5	153	Ernie Jones	Safety	Miami (FL)	
5	156	Larry Bates	Running back	Miami (FL)	
6	157	Alvis Darby	Tight end	Florida	
7	184	Dick Dixon	Defensive tackle	Arkansas State	
8	210	Larry Shipp	Wide receiver	LSU	
9	239	Bob Bos	Offensive tackle	Iowa State	
10	266	Randy Coffield	Linebacker	Florida State	
11	293	Keith Muehr	Punter	Southwestern Louisiana	
12	320	Ron Barnett	Wide receiver	Texas–Arlington	
13	349	Andy Reid	Running back	Georgia	
14	376	Jarvis Blinks	Defensive back	Northwestern State	
15	405	Dan Smith	Offensive tackle	Washington State	
16	432	Jeff Urczyk	Guard	Georgia Tech	
17	461	Chris Rowland	Quarterback	Washington	
Made roster

== Personnel ==
=== Staff ===
1976 Seattle Seahawks staff
**Front office**: Chairman – Elmer J. Nordstrom, representing the Nordstrom family; Managing general partner – Herman Sarkowsky; Partner – D.E. (Ned) Skinner; Partner – Howard S. Wright; Partner – M. Lamont Bean; Partner – Lynn P. Himmelman; General manager – John Thompson; Assistant general manager – Mark Duncan; Director of player personnel – Dick Mansperger; Director of pro scouting – Chuck Allen; Administrative assistant – Vince Lombardi (Jr.); **Head coaches**: Head coach – Jack Patera; **Offensive coaches**: Offensive coordinator/offensive line – Sam Boghosian; Quarterbacks/receivers – Jerry Rhome; Offensive backs – Andy MacDonald	**Defensive coaches**: Defensive coordinator/defensive backs – Bob Hollway; Defensive line – Earl Leggett; Linebackers – Larry Peccatiello; **Strength and conditioning**: Head trainer – Bruce Scott; Assistant trainer – Jim Whitesel

=== Final roster ===
1976 Seattle Seahawks roster
**Quarterbacks (QB)**: 19 Bill Munson; 16 Steve Myer; **10** Jim Zorn; **Running backs (RB)**: 37 Hugh McKinnis; 44 Ralph Nelson; 30 Oliver Ross; **47** Sherman Smith; **42** Don Testerman; **Wide receivers (WR)**: 88 Don Clune; **80** Steve Largent; **84** Sam McCullum; 83 Steve Raible; **Tight ends (TE)**: **87** Ron Howard; 81 John McMakin	**Offensive linemen (OL)**: **63** Nick Bebout T; 60 Ron Coder G/T; **65** John Demarie G; **73** Norm Evans T; **53** Fred Hoaglin C; 64 Gordon Jolley G; 54 Art Kuehn C; 78 Bob Newton G; **67** Bob Penchion G; 62 Dave Simonson T; **Defensive linemen (DL)**: 74 Carl Barisich DT; **77** Richard Harris DT; **70** Bob Lurtsema DE; **71** Steve Niehaus DT; **75** Dave Tipton DE; 72 Larry Woods DT	**Linebackers (LB)**: **38** Ed Bradley MLB; 52 Randy Coffield OLB; 50 Greg Collins MLB; **32** Mike Curtis OLB; **36** Ken Geddes OLB; 56 Sammy Green OLB; **Defensive backs (DB)**: 28 Lyle Blackwood SS; **22** Dave Brown FS; 25 Don Dufek FS; 49 Ernie Jones CB; **29** Al Matthews SS; **41** Eddie McMillan CB; **45** Rolly Woolsey CB; **Special teams (ST)**: 5 Rick Engles P; 3 John Leypoldt K	**Reserve**: 40 Larry Bates RB (IR); 59 Ken Hutcherson LB (IR); 85 Charles Waddell TE (IR); Rookies in italics 45 active, 3 reserve

- Starters in bold.

== Schedule ==
=== Preseason ===
Week	Date	Opponent	Result	Record	Game site	Recap
1	August 1	San Francisco 49ers	**L** 20–27	0–1	Kingdome	Recap
2	August 7	Chicago Bears	**L** 16–27	0–2	Joe Albi Stadium (Spokane)	Recap
3	August 14	Los Angeles Rams	**L** 13–16	0–3	Kingdome	Recap
4	August 21	at Denver Broncos	**L** 7–52	0–4	Mile High Stadium	Recap
5	August 29	San Diego Chargers	**W** 17–16	1–4	Kingdome	Recap
6	September 4	at Oakland Raiders	**L** 28–45	1–5	Oakland–Alameda County Coliseum	Recap

Source: Seahawks Media Guides

=== Regular season ===
In its first year, Seattle played all of the teams in the NFC, plus fellow expansion team Tampa Bay, as a member of the NFC West.

Week	Date	Opponent	Result	Record	Game site	Recap
1	September 12	St. Louis Cardinals	**L** 24–30	0–1	Kingdome	Recap
2	September 19	at Washington Redskins	**L** 7–31	0–2	RFK Stadium	Recap
3	September 26	**San Francisco 49ers**	**L** 21–37	0–3	Kingdome	Recap
4	October 3	Dallas Cowboys	**L** 13–28	0–4	Kingdome	Recap
5	October 10	at Green Bay Packers	**L** 20–27	0–5	Milwaukee County Stadium	Recap
6	October 17	at Tampa Bay Buccaneers	**W** 13–10	1–5	Tampa Stadium	Recap
7	October 24	Detroit Lions	**L** 14–41	1–6	Kingdome	Recap
8	October 31	at **Los Angeles Rams**	**L** 6–45	1–7	Los Angeles Memorial Coliseum	Recap
9	November 7	**Atlanta Falcons**	**W** 30–13	2–7	Kingdome	Recap
10	November 14	at Minnesota Vikings	**L** 21–27	2–8	Metropolitan Stadium	Recap
11	November 21	**New Orleans Saints**	**L** 27–51	2–9	Kingdome	Recap
12	November 28	at New York Giants	**L** 16–28	2–10	Giants Stadium	Recap
13	December 5	Chicago Bears	**L** 7–34	2–11	Kingdome	Recap
14	December 12	at Philadelphia Eagles	**L** 10–27	2–12	Veterans Stadium	Recap
Note: Intra-division opponents are in **bold** text.

Source: 1976 NFL season results

== Standings ==
NFC West
	W	L	T	PCT	DIV	CONF	PF	PA	STK
^{(3)} Los Angeles Rams	10	3	1	.750	7–0	9–2–1	351	190	W4
San Francisco 49ers	8	6	0	.571	5–2	7–5	270	190	W1
New Orleans Saints	4	10	0	.286	2–5	3–8	253	346	L3
Atlanta Falcons	4	10	0	.286	2–5	4–8	172	312	L3
Seattle Seahawks	2	12	0	.143	1–3	1–12	229	429	L5

== Game summaries ==
=== Preseason ===
==== Week P1: vs. San Francisco 49ers ====
Preseason Week One: Seattle Seahawks vs. San Francisco 49ers – Game summary

Quarter	1	2	3	4	Total
49ers	7	10	10	0	27
Seahawks	0	0	7	13	20

at Kingdome, Seattle, Washington

- Date: August 1
- Game time: 1:06 pm local
- Game weather: indoors
- Game attendance: 60,825
- Referee: Jim Tunney
- TV: KIRO tape delay
- Gamebook

==== Week P2: vs. Chicago Bears ====
Preseason Week Two: Seattle Seahawks vs. Chicago Bears – Game summary

Quarter	1	2	3	4	Total
Bears	0	10	7	10	27
Seahawks	0	3	0	13	16

at Joe Albi Stadium, Spokane, Washington

- Date: August 7
- Game time: 7:06 pm local
- Game weather: showers, 63 °F or 17.2 °C, wind light
- Game attendance: 14,484
- Referee: Bob Frederic
- TV: KIRO
- Gamebook

==== Week P3: vs. Los Angeles Rams ====
Preseason Week Three: Seattle Seahawks vs. Los Angeles Rams – Game summary

Quarter	1	2	3	4	Total
Rams	3	6	7	0	16
Seahawks	0	0	0	13	13

at Kingdome, Seattle, Washington

- Date: August 14
- Game time: 7:38 pm local
- Game weather: indoors
- Game attendance: 62,532
- Referee: Fred Silva
- TV: KIRO tape delay
- Gamebook

==== Week P4: at Denver Broncos ====
Preseason Week Four: Seattle Seahawks at Denver Broncos – Game summary

Quarter	1	2	3	4	Total
Seahawks	0	7	0	0	7
Broncos	21	17	0	14	52

at Mile High Stadium, Denver, Colorado

- Date: August 21
- Game time: 8:00 pm local
- Game weather: partly cloudy, 84 °F or 28.9 °C, wind N 9 miles per hour (14 km/h; 7.8 kn)
- Game attendance: 24,852
- Referee: Red Cashion
- TV: KIRO
- Gamebook

==== Week P5: vs. San Diego Chargers ====
Preseason Week Five: Seattle Seahawks vs. San Diego Chargers – Game summary

Quarter	1	2	3	4	Total
Chargers	0	0	10	6	16
Seahawks	0	3	7	7	17

at Kingdome, Seattle, Washington

- Date: August 29
- Game time: 1:07 pm local
- Game weather: indoors
- Game attendance: 57,082
- Referee: Ben Dreith
- TV: KIRO tape delay
- Gamebook

==== Week P6: at Oakland Raiders ====
Preseason Week Six: Seattle Seahawks at Oakland Raiders – Game summary

Quarter	1	2	3	4	Total
Seahawks	7	0	0	21	28
Raiders	14	7	21	3	45

at Oakland–Alameda County Coliseum, Oakland, California

- Date: September 4
- Game time: 6:09 pm local
- Game weather: partly cloudy, 63 °F or 17.2 °C, 76% humidity, wind WNW 10 miles per hour (16 km/h; 8.7 kn)
- Game attendance: 51,487
- Referee: Gene Barth
- TV: KIRO
- Gamebook

=== Regular season ===
==== Week 1: vs. St. Louis Cardinals ====
Week One: Seattle Seahawks vs. St. Louis Cardinals – Game summary

Quarter	1	2	3	4	Total
Cardinals	3	10	10	7	30
Seahawks	3	0	7	14	24

at Kingdome, Seattle, Washington

- Date: September 12
- Game time: 1:09 pm local
- Game weather: indoors
- Game attendance: 58,441
- Referee: Tom Bell
- TV announcers (CBS): Jim Thacker and Alex Hawkins
- Gamebook

Game information

First quarter

- STL – Jim Bakken 28-yard field goal, 6:22 (STL 3–0)
- SEA – Don Bitterlich 27-yard field goal, 1:15 (Tied 3–3)

Second quarter

- STL – Ike Harris 12-yard pass from Jim Hart (Jim Bakken kick), 13:05 (STL 10–3)
- STL – Jim Bakken 22-yard field goal, 0:21 (STL 13–3)

Third quarter

- STL – Pat Tilley 27-yard pass from Jim Hart (Jim Bakken kick), 12:51 (STL 20–3)
- STL – Jim Bakken 26-yard field goal, 5:47 (STL 23–3)
- SEA – Sam McCullum 15-yard pass from Jim Zorn 3:52 (Don Bitterlich kick), (STL 23–10)

Fourth quarter

- STL – Jim Otis 1-yard run (Jim Bakken kick), 14:10 (STL 30–10)
- SEA – Sam McCullum 72-yard pass from Jim Zorn 13:50 (Don Bitterlich kick), (STL 30–17)
- SEA – Jim Zorn 8-yard run (Don Bitterlich kick), 5:09 (STL 30–24)

Top passers

- STL – Jim Hart: 15/23, 180 yds, 2 TD, 1 INT
- SEA – Jim Zorn: 17/37, 292 yds, 2 TD, 2 INT

Top rushers

- STL – Jim Otis: 27 car, 140 yds, 1 TD
- SEA – Andy Bolton: 12 car, 37 yds

Top receivers

- STL – Steve Jones: 3 rec, 59 yds
- SEA – Sam McCullum: 4 rec, 112 yds, 2 TD

Team – pass – rush – total – to

- STL – 175 – 281 – 456 – 2
- SEA – 279 – 73 – 352 – 3

The Seahawks played their first game in team history on September 12, 1976, hosting the St. Louis Cardinals at the Kingdome in Seattle, Washington. The Cardinals took a 3–0 lead after Jim Bakken kicked a 28-yard field goal, however, the Seahawks fought back and Don Bitterlich kicked a 27-yard field goal to earn the first points in team history, and to tie the game at 3–3. St. Louis took a 10–3 lead in the second quarter, as Ike Harris caught a 12-yard touchdown pass from Jim Hart. The Cardinals then kicked another field goal to take a 13–3 lead into halftime. St. Louis stayed hot in the third quarter, as Pat Tilley caught a 27-yard pass for a touchdown, followed by another field goal by Jim Bakken, as St. Louis took a commanding 23–3 lead. The Seahawks cut into the lead late in the third quarter, as Sam McCullum scored the first touchdown in team history, completing a 15-yard pass from Jim Zorn, as Seattle narrowed the Cardinals lead to 23–10. In the fourth quarter, Cardinals running back Jim Otis scored a one-yard touchdown, as St. Louis took a 30–10 lead. The Seahawks made a late charge in the fourth quarter, as McCullum scored his second touchdown of the game, completing a 72-yard pass from Zorn, to make the score 30–17. Later in the quarter, Zorn had an eight-yard rushing touchdown, as the Seahawks cut the Cardinals lead down to six, 30–24, however, it would be too late, as the Cardinals hung on for the victory.

With the loss, the Seahawks began the season 0–1–0.

==== Week 2: at Washington Redskins ====
Week Two: Seattle Seahawks at Washington Redskins – Game summary

Quarter	1	2	3	4	Total
Seahawks	0	0	0	7	7
Redskins	7	10	7	7	31

at Robert F. Kennedy Memorial Stadium, Washington, D.C.

- Date: September 19
- Game time: 1:05 pm local
- Game weather: clear, 78 °F or 25.6 °C, 68% humidity, wind NW 15 miles per hour (24 km/h; 13 kn)
- Game attendance: 53,174
- Referee: Bernie Ulman
- TV announcers (CBS): Lindsey Nelson and Alex Hawkins
- Gamebook

Game information

First quarter

- WAS – Mike Thomas 5-yard run (Mark Moseley kick), 6:05 (WAS 7–0)

Second quarter

- WAS – Mark Moseley 37-yard field goal, 12:48 (WAS 10–0)
- WAS – Jean Fugett 12-yard pass from Billy Kilmer (Mark Moseley kick), 2:29 (WAS 17–0)

Third quarter

- WAS – Mike Thomas 10-yard pass from Billy Kilmer (Mark Moseley kick), 8:20 (WAS 24–0)

Fourth quarter

- SEA – Don Testerman 1-yard run (Don Bitterlich kick), 14:56 (WAS 24–7)
- WAS – Frank Grant 5-yard pass from Billy Kilmer (Mark Moseley kick), 1:18 (WAS 31–7)

Top passers

- SEA – Jim Zorn: 9/20, 128 yds, 2 INT
- WAS – Billy Kilmer: 17/25, 184 yds, 3 TD, 1 INT

Top rushers

- SEA – Jim Zorn: 7 car, 54 yds
- WAS – Mike Thomas: 27 car, 143 yds, 1 TD

Top receivers

- SEA – Ron Howard: 3 rec, 48 yds
- WAS – Jean Fugett: 5 rec, 50 yds, 1 TD

Team – pass – rush – total – to

- SEA – 103 – 102 – 205 – 3
- WAS – 155 – 273 – 428 – 3

The Seahawks played their first ever road game in week two, as they traveled across the country to Washington, D.C. to face the Washington Redskins. Washington opened the season with a 19–17 win over the New York Giants in the first week of the season. The Redskins opened the scoring in the first quarter, as Mike Thomas rushed for five yards into the Seahawks' end zone to give Washington a 7–0 lead. In the second quarter, Redskins kicker Mark Moseley kicked a 37-yard field goal to make the score 10–0. Jean Fugett then completed a 12-yard pass from Billy Kilmer to give the Redskins a 17–0 lead heading into halftime. In the third quarter, Mike Thomas earned his second touchdown of the game, as he caught a 10-yard pass from Kilmer to increase the Redskins lead to 24–0. The Seahawks got on the board in the fourth quarter, as Don Testerman rushed one yard into the end zone to cut Washington's lead to 24–7, however, the Redskins Frank Grant caught a five-yard pass from Kilmer, as Washington won the game easily by a 31–7 score.

Seattle fell to 0–2–0 with the loss.

==== Week 3: vs. San Francisco 49ers ====
Week Three: Seattle Seahawks vs. San Francisco 49ers – Game summary

Quarter	1	2	3	4	Total
49ers	17	14	0	6	37
Seahawks	7	0	7	7	21

at Kingdome, Seattle, Washington

- Date: September 26
- Game time: 1:08 pm local
- Game weather: indoors
- Game attendance: 59,108
- Referee: Jim Tunney
- TV announcers (CBS): Gary Bender and Johnny Unitas
- Gamebook

Game information

First quarter

- SF – Steve Mike-Mayer 45-yard field goal, 9:10 (SF 3–0)
- SF – Ralph McGill 50-yard punt return (Steve Mike-Mayer kick), 6:36 (SF 10–0)
- SF – Gene Washington 38-yard pass from Jim Plunkett (Steve Mike-Mayer kick), 4:10 (SF 17–0)
- SEA – Hugh McKinnis 1-yard run (Don Bitterlich kick),1:26 (SF 17–7)

Second quarter

- SF – Gene Washington 15-yard pass from Jim Plunkett (Steve Mike-Mayer kick), 12:05 (SF 24–7)
- SF – Willie McGee 52-yard pass from Jim Plunkett (Steve Mike-Mayer kick), 1:05 (SF 31–7)

Third quarter

- SEA – Hugh McKinnis 1-yard run (Don Bitterlich kick), 1:20 (SF 31–14)

Fourth quarter

- SEA – Steve Largent 6-yard pass from Jim Zorn (Don Bitterlich kick), 7:37 (SF 31–21)
- SF – Steve Mike-Mayer 45-yard field goal, 2:30 (SF 34–21)
- SF – Steve Mike-Mayer 31-yard field goal, 1:00 (SF 37–21)

Top passers

- SF – Jim Plunkett: 16/29, 239 yds, 3 TD, 1 INT
- SEA – Jim Zorn: 20/43, 264 yds, 1 TD, 2 INT

Top rushers

- SF – Delvin Williams: 18 car, 87 yds
- SEA – Hugh McKinnis: 17 car, 43 yds, 2 TD

Top receivers

- SF – Willie McGee: 5 rec, 104 yds, 1 TD
- SEA – Steve Largent: 7 rec, 104 yds, 1 TD

Team – pass – rush – total – to

- SF – 239 – 142 – 381 – 1
- SEA – 291 – 130 – 421 – 3

The Seahawks returned home for the third week of the season, as they faced the San Francisco 49ers, who had a 1–1–0 record during their first two games. The 49ers took control of the game early, as in the first quarter, kicker Steve Mike-Mayer had a 45-yard field goal to give San Francisco a 3–0 lead. The Niners then took a 10–0 lead when Ralph McGill ran back a 50-yard punt return. Gene Washington completed a 38-yard pass from quarterback Jim Plunkett to give the 49ers a 17–0 lead in the first quarter. The Seahawks Hugh McKinnis had a one-yard rush into the 49ers' end zone to cut San Francisco's lead to 17–7 at the end of the quarter. The 49ers took a 24–7 lead when Washington caught his second touchdown completion of the game in the second quarter, followed by a 52-yard touchdown completion by Willie McGee as San Francisco had a 31–7 lead going into halftime. In the third quarter, McKinnis rushed for his second touchdown of the game to cut the 49ers lead to 31–14. In the fourth quarter, Seattle continued to come back, as Steve Largent caught a six-yard touchdown pass from Jim Zorn to make the score 31–21. The 49ers Steve Mike-Mayer then kicked two late field goals in the game, as San Francisco won 37–21.

The loss dropped the Seahawks to 0–3–0.

==== Week 4: vs. Dallas Cowboys ====
Week Four: Seattle Seahawks vs. Dallas Cowboys – Game summary

Quarter	1	2	3	4	Total
Cowboys	0	14	7	7	28
Seahawks	7	6	0	0	13

at Kingdome, Seattle, Washington

- Date: October 3
- Game time: 1:09 pm local
- Game weather: indoors
- Game attendance: 62,027
- Referee: Don Wedge
- TV announcers (CBS): Jim Thacker and Sonny Jurgensen
- Gamebook

Game information

First quarter

- SEA – Don Testerman 9-yard pass from Jim Zorn (Don Bitterlich kick),6:44 (SEA 7–0)

Second quarter

- SEA – Steve Largent 4-yard pass from Jim Zorn (Don Bitterlich kick is no good), 14:22 (SEA 13–0)
- DAL – Drew Pearson 8-yard pass from Roger Staubach (Efren Herrera kick), 9:03 (SEA 13–7)
- DAL – Charley Young 25-yard pass from Roger Staubach (Efren Herrera kick), 1:34 (DAL 14–13)

Third quarter

- DAL – Robert Newhouse 24-yard run (Efren Herrera kick), 1:48 (DAL 21–13)

Fourth quarter

- DAL – Doug Dennison 1-yard run (Efren Herrera kick), 5:05 (DAL 28–13)

Top passers

- DAL – Roger Staubach: 14/20, 200 yds, 2 TD, 1 INT
- SEA – Jim Zorn: 19/41, 147 yds, 2 TD, 1 INT

Top rushers

- DAL – Robert Newhouse: 19 car, 120 yds, 1 TD
- SEA – Don Testerman: 9 car, 42 yds

Top receivers

- DAL – Billy Joe DuPree: 5 rec, 77 yds
- SEA – Don Testerman: 5 rec, 37 yds, 1 TD

Team – pass – rush – total – to

- DAL – 200 – 211 – 411 – 1
- SEA – 140 – 103 – 243 – 1

The Dallas Cowboys came into the Kingdome for the Seahawks fourth game of the season. Dallas had a record of 3–0 to begin the year. The Seahawks took the lead in the game for the first time in team history in the first quarter when Don Testerman caught a seven-yard touchdown completion from Jim Zorn to give Seattle a 7–0 lead on the undefeated Cowboys. In the second quarter, the Seahawks continued to stun the Cowboys, as Jim Zorn threw his second touchdown completion, this time a four-yard pass to Steve Largent, however, the extra point convert failed, as Seattle took a 13–0 lead. The Cowboys began to comeback, as Drew Pearson caught an eight-yard pass from Roger Staubach for a touchdown to cut the Seahawks lead to 13–7. Dallas then took a 14–13 lead into halftime, as Charley Young caught a 25-yard pass by Staubach for a touchdown at the end of the quarter. The Cowboys scored another touchdown in the third quarter, as Robert Newhouse rushed for 24 yards into the Seahawks' end zone. Dallas put the game out of reach in the fourth quarter, scoring their fourth touchdown in a row when Doug Dennison had a one-yard run, as the Cowboys won the game 28–13.

With the loss, the Seahawks record dropped to 0–4–0.

==== Week 5: at Green Bay Packers ====
Week Five: Seattle Seahawks at Green Bay Packers – Game summary

Quarter	1	2	3	4	Total
Seahawks	0	13	7	0	20
Packers	7	0	7	13	27

at Milwaukee County Stadium, Milwaukee, Wisconsin

- Date: October 10
- Game time: 1:07 pm local
- Game weather: hazy, 55 °F or 12.8 °C, 80% humidity, wind SE 5 miles per hour (8.0 km/h; 4.3 kn)
- Game attendance: 54,983
- Referee: Gordon McCarter
- TV announcers (CBS): Gary Bender and Johnny Unitas
- Gamebook

Game information

First quarter

- GB – Barty Smith 1-yard run (Chester Marcol kick), 5:12 (GB 7–0)

Second quarter

- SEA – Steve Raible 26-yard blocked punt return (John Leypoldt kick), 14:51(Tied 7–7)
- SEA – John Leypoldt 48-yard field goal, 3:06 (SEA 10–7)
- SEA – John Leypoldt 44-yard field goal, 0:02 (SEA 13–7)

Third quarter

- SEA – Ralph Nelson 1-yard run (John Leypoldt kick), 9:06 (SEA 20–7)
- GB – Steve Odom 66-yard pass from Lynn Dickey (Chester Marcol kick), 1:57 (SEA 20–14)

Fourth quarter

- GB – Barty Smith 6-yard run (Chester Marcol kick), 7:42 (GB 21–20)
- GB – Willard Harrell 6-yard run (Chester Marcol kick is no good), 2:42 (GB 27–20)

Top passers

- SEA – Jim Zorn: 17/32, 194 yds, 1 INT
- GB – Lynn Dickey: 16/24, 215 yds, 1 TD, 2 INT

Top rushers

- SEA – Ralph Nelson: 14 car, 38 yds, 1 TD
- GB – Barty Smith: 20 car, 84 yds, 2 TD

Top receivers

- SEA – Don Testerman: 3 rec, 54 yds
- GB – Steve Odom: 3 rec, 92 yds, 1 TD

Team – pass – rush – total – to

- SEA – 169 – 58 – 227 – 2
- GB – 193 – 187 – 380 – 3

After two home games in a row, the Seahawks were back on the road for the fifth week of the season, as they visited the Green Bay Packers at County Stadium in Milwaukee, Wisconsin. The Packers entered the game with a 1–3–0 record. Green Bay opened the scoring in the first quarter, when Barty Smith rushed for a yard into the Seahawks' end zone to give the Packers a 7–0 lead. The Seahawks responded with a big second quarter, as Steve Raible ran back a 26-yard blocked punt return for a touchdown to even the score at 7–7. The Seahawks took a 10–7 lead as John Leypoldt kicked a 48-yard field goal. Leypoldt kicked a second field goal, a 44-yard kick, to give Seattle a 13–7 lead into halftime. In the third quarter, the Seahawks took a 20–7 lead when Ralph Nelson ran for a one-yard touchdown. The Packers cut the lead to 20–14 when Steve Odom caught a 66-yard pass from Lynn Dickey to close out the third quarter. In the fourth, the Packers took a 21–20 lead when Barty Smith ran for a six-yard touchdown. Green Bay scored another touchdown, this time a six-yard rush by Willard Harrell, however, the extra point failed, as the Packers took the lead 27–20, and hung on to win the game.

With the loss, the Seahawks dropped to 0–5–0.

==== Week 6: at Tampa Bay Buccaneers ====
Week Six: Seattle Seahawks at Tampa Bay Buccaneers – Game summary

Quarter	1	2	3	4	Total
Seahawks	0	13	0	0	13
Buccaneers	3	0	7	0	10

at Tampa Stadium, Tampa, Florida

- Date: October 17
- Game time: 1:06 pm local
- Game weather: partly cloudy, 80 °F or 26.7 °C, 78% humidity, wind W 8 miles per hour (13 km/h; 7.0 kn)
- Game attendance: 43,812
- Referee: Ben Dreith
- TV announcers (CBS): Jim Thacker and Tom Matte
- Gamebook

Game information

First quarter

- TB – Dave Green 38-yard field goal, 7:22 (TB 3–0)

Second quarter

- SEA – Sam McCullum 15-yard pass from Jim Zorn (John Leypoldt kick), 13:15 (SEA 7–3)
- SEA – John Leypoldt 25-yard field goal, 1:59 (SEA 10–3)
- SEA – John Leypoldt 39-yard field goal, 0:18 (SEA 13–3)

Third quarter

- TB – Morris Owens 1-yard pass from Louis Carter (Dave Green (American football)

Top passers

- SEA – Jim Zorn: 11/27, 167 yds, 1 TD, 1 INT
- TB – Steve Spurrier: 18/30, 170 yds

Top rushers

- SEA – Sherman Smith: 10 car, 45 yds
- TB – Louis Carter: 15 car, 66 yds

Top receivers

- SEA – Sam McCullum: 5 rec, 64 yds, 1 TD
- TB – Ed Williams: 4 rec, 42 yds

Team – pass – rush – total – to

- SEA – 163 – 90 – 253 – 2
- TAM – 140 – 145 – 285 – 1

The Seahawks remained on the road for the sixth week of the season, traveling to Tampa, Florida to face their expansion cousins, the Tampa Bay Buccaneers. The Buccaneers entered the game with a 0–5–0 record. Tampa Bay opened the scoring in the first quarter, when kicker Dave Green connected for a 38-yard field goal to give the Buccaneers a 3–0 lead. In the second quarter, the Seahawks took the lead when Sam McCullum caught a 15-yard pass from Jim Zorn to give the Seahawks a 7–3 lead. Before the quarter was over, Seahawks kicker John Leypoldt had two field goals, to give Seattle a 13–3 lead at halftime. In the third quarter, the Buccaneers cut the Seahawks lead down to three when Morris Owens caught a one-yard pass from Louis Carter to make it 13–10 for the Seahawks. In the fourth quarter, the Seahawks held off the Buccaneers, as Seattle held on for the win, the first in team history.

With the win, the Seahawks improved their record to 1–5–0.

==== Week 7: vs. Detroit Lions ====
Week Seven: Seattle Seahawks vs. Detroit Lions – Game summary

Quarter	1	2	3	4	Total
Lions	13	7	14	7	41
Seahawks	0	14	0	0	14

at Kingdome, Seattle, Washington

- Date: October 24
- Game time: 1:08 pm local
- Game weather: indoors
- Game attendance: 61,280
- Referee: Cal Lepore
- TV announcers (CBS): Gary Bender and Johnny Unitas
- Gamebook

Game information

First quarter

- DET – Benny Ricardo 25-yard field goal, 9:40 (DET 3–0)
- DET – Benny Ricardo 44-yard field goal, 1:55 (DET 6–0)
- DET – David Hill 20-yard pass from Greg Landry (Benny Ricardo kick), 0:15 (DET 13–0)

Second quarter

- DET – Levi Johnson 70-yard interception return (Benny Ricardo kick), 13:17 (DET 20–0)
- SEA – Hugh McKinnis 2-yard run (John Leypoldt kick), 10:27 (DET 20–7)
- SEA – Hugh McKinnis 9-yard run (John Leypoldt kick), 7:57 (DET 20–14)

Third quarter

- DET – Charlie Sanders 8-yard pass from Greg Landry (Benny Ricardo kick), 7:55 (DET 27–14)
- DET – Lawrence Gaines 9-yard pass from Greg Landry (Benny Ricardo kick), 3:53 (DET 34–14)

Fourth quarter

- DET – Lem Barney 24-yard interception return (Benny Ricardo kick), 4:03 (DET 41–14)

Top passers

- DET – Greg Landry: 18/27, 233 yds, 3 TD
- SEA – Jim Zorn: 18/37, 249 yds, 6 INT

Top rushers

- DET – Dexter Bussey: 7 car, 37 yds
- SEA – Sherman Smith: 15 car, 62 yds

Top receivers

- DET – Charlie Sanders: 4 rec, 89 yds, 1 TD
- SEA – Sherman Smith: 7 rec, 93 yds

Team – pass – rush – total – to

- DET – 217 – 152 – 369 – 1
- SEA – 242 – 97 – 339 – 8

The Seahawks returned home after two consecutive road games, and faced the Detroit Lions, who had a 2–4–0 record in their first six games of the season. The Lions opened the scoring in the first quarter when kicker Benny Ricardo had a 25-yard field goal. Ricardo then kicked a 44-yard field goal to give Detroit a 6–0 lead. The Lions then took a 13–0 lead when David Hill caught a 20-yard pass for a touchdown from quarterback Greg Landry at the end of the first quarter. The Lions stretched their lead to 20–0 when Levi Johnson intercepted a pass from Seahawks quarterback Jim Zorn and ran it back 70 yards into the Seahawks' end zone in the second quarter. Seattle cut into the Lions lead when Hugh McKinnis rushed for a two-yard touchdown, to make the score 20–7 for Detroit. Before halftime, McKinnis ran for another touchdown, this time a seven-yard run, to make the score 20–14. The Lions took control of the game in the third quarter when Charlie Sanders caught an eight-yard pass for a touchdown to give the Lions a 27–14 lead. Lawrence Gaines then caught a nine-yard pass for a touchdown as Detroit took a 34–14 lead. In the fourth quarter, the Lions Lem Barney had a 24-yard interception and ran it back for a touchdown, as the Lions won the game 41–14. Jim Zorn threw six interceptions in the game, and in total, the Seahawks had eight turnovers.

With the loss, the Seahawks record dropped to 1–6–0.

==== Week 8: at Los Angeles Rams ====
Week Eight: Seattle Seahawks at Los Angeles Rams – Game summary

Quarter	1	2	3	4	Total
Seahawks	0	3	3	0	6
Rams	24	7	0	14	45

at Los Angeles Memorial Coliseum, Los Angeles

- Date: October 31
- Game time: 1:09 pm local
- Game weather: hazy, 80 °F or 26.7 °C, 68% humidity, wind W 2 miles per hour (3.2 km/h; 1.7 kn)
- Game attendance: 52,035
- Referee: Red Cashion
- TV announcers (CBS): Don Criqui and Alex Hawkins
- Gamebook

Game information

First quarter

- LA – Tom Dempsey 20-yard field goal, 9:13 (LA 3–0)
- LA – Monte Jackson 41-yard interception return (Tom Dempsey kick), 7:43 (LA 10–0)
- LA – Lawrence McCutcheon 6-yard run (Tom Dempsey kick), 4:43 (LA 17–0)
- LA – Ron Jessie 15-yard pass from James Harris (Tom Dempsey kick), 1:04 (LA 24–0)

Second quarter

- SEA – John Leypoldt 43-yard field goal, 13:35 (LA 24–3)
- LA – Harold Jackson 20-yard pass from James Harris (Tom Dempsey kick), 2:09 (LA 31–3)

Third quarter

- SEA – John Leypoldt 41-yard field goal, 4:17 (LA 31–6)

Fourth quarter

- LA – Rob Scribner 1-yard rush (Tom Dempsey kick), 8:16 (LA 38–6)
- LA – Tom Geredine 23-yard pass from Pat Haden (Tom Dempsey kick), 3:06 (LA 45–6)

Top passers

- SEA – Bill Munson: 9/19, 147 yds, 1 INT
- LA – James Harris: 14/25, 208 yds, 2 TD

Top rushers

- SEA – Don Testerman: 5 car, 15 yds
- LA – Rod Phillips: 12 car, 86 yds

Top receivers

- SEA – Sam McCullum: 3 rec, 70 yds
- LA – Harold Jackson: 5 rec, 85 yds, 1 TD

Team – pass – rush – total – to

- SEA – 144 – 50 – 194 – 2
- LA – 223 – 206 – 429 – 1

The Seahawks headed back on the road for the eighth week of the season, traveling to Los Angeles to face the NFC West Division leading Los Angeles Rams, who entered the game with a 5–1–1 record. The Rams opened the scoring in the first quarter, when Tom Dempsey kicked a 20-yard field goal to make it 3–0 Los Angeles. The Rams then took a 10–0 lead when Monte Jackson had a 41-yard interception for a touchdown from Seahawks quarterback Jim Zorn. Los Angeles took a 17–0 lead when Lawrence McCutcheon had a six-yard rushing touchdown, followed by a touchdown by Ron Jessie as he caught a 15-yard pass from James Harris, giving the Rams a 24–0 lead after the first quarter. The Seahawks broke the shutout in the second quarter, when John Leypoldt was good on a 43-yard field goal attempt to cut the Rams lead to 24–3. Los Angeles took a 31–3 lead into halftime after Harold Jackson caught a 30-yard pass from Harris. In the third quarter, John Leypoldt connected for his second field goal of the game for the Seahawks, making the score 31–6 for the Rams. Los Angeles took a 38–6 lead in the fourth quarter when Rob Scribner rushed for a yard into the Seahawks' end zone. The Rams capped off the scoring when Tom Geredine caught a pass from Pat Haden, giving the Rams the victory by a score of 45–6.

With the loss, the Seahawks record fell to 1–7–0.

==== Week 9: vs. Atlanta Falcons ====
Week Nine: Seattle Seahawks vs. Atlanta Falcons – Game summary

Quarter	1	2	3	4	Total
Falcons	0	3	3	7	13
Seahawks	0	14	16	0	30

at Kingdome, Seattle, Washington

- Date: November 7
- Game time: 1:01 pm local
- Game weather: indoors
- Game attendance: 57,985
- Referee: Bob Frederic
- TV announcers (CBS): Bob Costas and Tom Matte
- Gamebook

Game information

First quarter

- No scoring plays

Second quarter

- ATL – Nick Mike-Mayer 18-yard field goal, 12:18 (ATL 3–0)
- SEA – Sherman Smith 21-yard pass from Jim Zorn (John Leypoldt kick), 6:55 (SEA 7–3)
- SEA – John McMakin 31-yard pass from Jim Zorn (John Leypoldt kick), 6:37 (SEA 14–3)

Third quarter

- SEA – Safety, Dave Brown tackled Rolland Lawrence in end zone, 12:23 (SEA 16–3)
- ATL – Nick Mike-Mayer 21-yard field goal, 10:25 (SEA 16–6)
- SEA – Al Matthews 40-yard interception return (John Leypoldt kick), 8:48 (SEA 23–6)
- SEA – Sherman Smith 53-yard rush (John Leypoldt kick), 8:12 (SEA 30–6)

Fourth quarter

- ATL – Alfred Jenkins 15-yard pass from Kim McQuilken (Nick Mike-Mayer kick), 7:08 (SEA 30–13)

Top passers

- ATL – Kim McQuilken: 5/15, 34 yds, 1 TD, 3 INT
- SEA – Jim Zorn: 12/23, 125 yds, 1 TD, 3 INT

Top rushers

- ATL – Sonny Collins: 17 car, 100 yds
- SEA – Sherman Smith: 14 car, 124 yds, 1 TD

Top receivers

- ATL – Alfred Jenkins: 2 rec, 34 yds, 1 TD
- SEA – John McMakin: 2 rec, 42 yds

Team – pass – rush – total – to

- ATL – 90 – 148 – 238 – 6
- SEA – 153 – 196 – 349 – 4

The Seahawks returned to Seattle for their ninth game of the season, as they hosted the Atlanta Falcons, who entered the game with a 2–6–0 record. After a scoreless first quarter, the Falcons opened the scoring in the second, when kicker Nick Mike-Mayer was successful on an 18-yard attempt to give Atlanta a 3–0 lead. The Seahawks responded when Sherman Smith caught a 21-yard touchdown pass from Jim Zorn, as Seattle took a 7–3 lead. The Seahawks upped their lead to 14–3 by halftime, when John McMakin had a 31-yard touchdown reception. In the third quarter, Seahawks cornerback Dave Brown tackled the Falcons Rolland Lawrence in the Falcons' end zone for a safety, giving Seattle a 16–3 lead. Nick Mike-Mayer of the Falcons kicked his second field goal of the game later in the quarter to cut the Seahawks lead to 16–6, however, Al Matthews of the Seahawks intercepted a pass from Falcons quarterback Kim McQuilken and ran it 40 yards into the Falcons' end zone, giving the Seahawks a 23–6 lead. Before the end of the third quarter, the Seahawks added another touchdown when Sherman Smith had a 53-yard rush, as Seattle took a 30–6 lead. Alfred Jenkins of the Falcons scored a touchdown in the fourth quarter, however, the Seahawks won the game 30–13 for their first ever victory at the Kingdome.

With the win, Seattle improved to 2–7–0.

==== Week 10: at Minnesota Vikings ====
Week Ten: Seattle Seahawks at Minnesota Vikings – Game summary

Quarter	1	2	3	4	Total
Seahawks	7	0	7	7	21
Vikings	7	7	6	7	27

at Metropolitan Stadium, Bloomington, Minnesota

- Date: November 14
- Game time: 1:00 pm local
- Game weather: clear, 38 °F or 3.3 °C, 53% humidity, wind SW 9 miles per hour (14 km/h; 7.8 kn)
- Game attendance: 45,087
- Referee: Gordon McCarter
- TV announcers (CBS): JimThacker and Tom Matte
- Gamebook

Game information

First quarter

- MIN – Brent McClanahan 1-yard run (Fred Cox kick), 9:07 (MIN 7–0)
- SEA – Jim Zorn 12-yard run (John Leypoldt kick), 6:59 (Tied 7–7)

Second quarter

- MIN – Sammy White 29-yard pass from Fran Tarkenton (Fred Cox kick), 6:04 (MIN 14–7)

Third quarter

- SEA – Steve Raible 80-yard pass from Jim Zorn (John Leypoldt kick), 12:30 (Tied 14–14)
- MIN – Fred Cox 43-yard field goal, 9:23 (MIN 17–14)
- MIN – Fred Cox 39-yard field goal, 0:49 (MIN 20–14)

Fourth quarter

- SEA – Sam McCullum 7-yard pass from Jim Zorn (John Leypoldt kick), 11:19 (SEA 21–20)
- MIN – Stu Voigt 5-yard pass from Fran Tarkenton (Fred Cox kick), 4:52 (MIN 27–21)

Top passers

- SEA – Jim Zorn: 17/29, 278 yds, 2 TD, 3 INT
- MIN – Fran Tarkenton: 26/31, 274 yds, 2 TD

Top rushers

- SEA – Sherman Smith: 17 car, 62 yds
- MIN – Chuck Foreman: 17 car, 100 yds

Top receivers

- SEA – Steve Raible: 3 rec, 112 yds, 1 TD
- MIN – Ahmad Rashad: 9 rec, 93 yds

Team – pass – rush – total – to

- SEA – 278 – 108 – 386 – 4
- MIN – 244 – 180 – 424 – 0

The Seahawks were on the road for their tenth game of the season, as they headed to Metropolitan Stadium in Bloomington, Minnesota to face the Minnesota Vikings. It was a very cold day, as the temperature at kickoff was 24 degrees, 16 with the windchill. Heading into the game, the Vikings had a 7–1–1 record. Minnesota took a 7–0 lead in the first quarter when Brent McClanahan rushed for a yard into the Seahawks' end zone. Seattle responded and tied the game at 7–7 when quarterback Jim Zorn rushed 12 yards into the Vikings' end zone. Minnesota re-took the lead in the second quarter when Sammy White caught a 29-yard pass for a touchdown from Fran Tarkenton, giving the Vikings a 14–7 into halftime. Seattle tied the game early in the third quarter, when Jim Zorn threw an 80-yard pass to Steve Raible, making the score 14–14. Vikings kicker Fred Cox broke the tie with a 43-yard field goal to give Minnesota a 17–14 lead, and then connected on a 39-yard attempt before the end of the quarter as the Vikings led the game 20–14. Seattle took their first lead of the game in the fourth quarter when Sam McCullum caught a seven-yard pass from Zorn, as the Seahawks took the lead 21–20. The Vikings avoided the upset though, as Stu Voigt caught a five-yard pass from Tarkenton, giving the Vikings the victory by a score of 27–21.

With the loss, Seattle fell to 2–8–0.

==== Week 11: vs. New Orleans Saints ====
Week Eleven: Seattle Seahawks vs. New Orleans Saints – Game summary

Quarter	1	2	3	4	Total
Saints	3	17	28	3	51
Seahawks	6	0	7	14	27

at Kingdome, Seattle, Washington

- Date: November 21
- Game time: 1:02 pm local
- Game weather: indoors
- Game attendance: 61,865
- Referee: Fred Silva
- TV announcers (CBS): Jim Thacker and Bob Lilly
- Gamebook

Game information

First quarter

- SEA – Sherman Smith 1-yard run (John Leypoldt kick is no good), 11:24 (SEA 6–0)
- NO – Rich Szaro 46-yard field goal, 0:08 (SEA 6–3)

Second quarter

- NO – Bobby Douglass 1-yard run (Rich Szaro kick), 4:54 (NO 10–6)
- NO – Bobby Douglass 3-yard run (Rich Szaro kick), 2:02 (NO 17–6)
- NO – Rich Szaro 36-yard field goal, 0:04 (NO 20–6)

Third quarter

- NO – Chuck Muncie 3-yard rush (Rich Szaro kick), 11:55 (NO 27–6)
- SEA – Steve Largent 11-yard pass from Bill Munson (John Leypoldt kick), 7:52 (NO 27–13)
- NO – Tom Myers 20-yard fumble return (Rich Szaro kick), 6:02 (NO 34–13)
- NO – Elex Price 23-yard interception return (Rich Szaro kick), 5:34 (NO 41–13)
- NO – Tony Galbreath 2-yard run (Rich Szaro kick), 1:12 (NO 48–13)

Fourth quarter

- SEA – Sherman Smith 1-yard run (John Leypoldt kick), 11:19 (NO 48–20)
- NO – Rich Szaro 21-yard field goal, 4:34 (NO 51–20)
- SEA – Jim Zorn 7-yard run (John Leypoldt kick), 1:49 (NO 51–27)

Top passers

- NO – Bobby Douglass: 12/21, 115 yds, 2 INT
- SEA – Jim Zorn: 11/22, 106 yds, 1 TD

Top rushers

- NO – Chuck Muncie: 12 car, 76 yds, 1 TD
- SEA – Sherman Smith: 11 car, 60 yds, 2 TD

Top receivers

- NO – Henry Childs: 2 rec, 34 yds
- SEA – Steve Largent: 6 rec, 101 yds, 1 TD

Team – pass – rush – total – to

- NO – 141 – 258 – 399 – 2
- SEA – 164 – 105 – 269 – 5

The Seahawks returned to the Kingdome for the eleventh week of the season, where they hosted the New Orleans Saints, who came into the game with a 3–7–0 record. Seattle opened the scoring when Sherman Smith had a one-yard rush into the Saints' end zone, however, the extra point failed, as the Seahawks had a 6–0 lead. New Orleans cut the Seahawks lead in half when kicker Rich Szaro had a 46-yard field goal, making the score 6–3 for Seattle. The Saints took full control of the game in the second quarter, as Bobby Douglass had two rushing touchdowns, followed by another field goal by Szaro, as the Saints scored 17 unanswered points to take a 20–6 lead. New Orleans kept coming on strong in the third quarter, as Chuck Muncie had a three-yard rushing touchdown to make it 27–6 for the Saints. Seattle cut into the Saints lead when Steve Largent caught an 11-yard pass from quarterback Bill Munson, making the score 27–13 for New Orleans. The Saints responded with three touchdowns before the end of the quarter, two of them on Seahawks turnovers. The Saints Tom Myers returned a 20-yard fumble into the Seattle end zone to make the score 34–13 for New Orleans. Elex Price then had a 23-yard interception return for a touchdown to give the Saints a 41–13 lead, followed by a Tony Galbreath three-yard run into the Seahawks' end zone to give New Orleans a 48–13 lead after three-quarters. In the fourth, the Seahawks Sherman Smith rushed for his second touchdown of the game, as the score was 48–20 for New Orleans. The Saints Rich Szaro kicked his third field goal of the game, this time from 21 yards, as New Orleans went ahead 51–20. Seahawks quarterback Jim Zorn had a seven-yard touchdown rush late in the game, making the final score 51–27 for the Saints.

With the loss, Seattle fell to 2–9–0.

==== Week 12: at New York Giants ====
Week Twelve: Seattle Seahawks at New York Giants – Game summary

Quarter	1	2	3	4	Total
Seahawks	9	0	7	0	16
Giants	0	14	7	7	28

at Giants Stadium, East Rutherford, New Jersey

- Date: November 28
- Game time: 1:06 pm local
- Game weather: cloudy, 55 °F or 12.8 °C, 87% humidity, wind N 10 miles per hour (16 km/h; 8.7 kn)
- Game attendance: 65,111
- Referee: Cal Lepore
- TV announcers (CBS): Gary Bender and Tom Brookshier
- Gamebook

Game information

First quarter

- SEA – Sherman Smith 2-yard run (John Leypoldt kick is no good), 5:12 (SEA 6–0)
- SEA – John Leypoldt 45-yard field goal, 1:54 (SEA 9–0)

Second quarter

- NYG – Gary Shirk 3-yard pass from Craig Morton (Joe Danelo kick), 11:57 (SEA 9–7)
- NYG – Gordon Bell 2-yard run (Joe Danelo kick), 4:35 (NYG 14–9)

Third quarter

- NYG – Gordon Bell 21-yard run (Joe Danelo kick), 12:36 (NYG 21–9)
- SEA – Jim Zorn 7-yard run (John Leypoldt kick), 2:01 (NYG 21–16)

Fourth quarter

- NYG – Ed Marshall 9-yard pass from Craig Morton (Joe Danelo kick), 11:11 (NYG 28–16)

Top passers

- SEA – Jim Zorn: 14/32, 137 yds, 3 INT
- NYG – Craig Morton: 15/21, 169 yds, 2 TD, 2 INT

Top rushers

- SEA – Don Testerman: 11 car, 51 yds
- NYG – Gordon Bell: 10 car, 56 yds, 2 TD

Top receivers

- SEA – Sherman Smith: 5 rec, 54 yds
- NYG – Ed Marshall: 3 rec, 44 yds, 1 TD

Team – pass – rush – total – to

- SEA – 116 – 128 – 244 – 3
- NYG – 115 – 164 – 279 – 4

For the twelfth week of the season, the Seahawks traveled across the country to Giants Stadium in East Rutherford, New Jersey, the Seattle faced the New York Giants, who entered the game with a 1–10–0 record. The Seahawks opened the scoring in the first quarter when Sherman Smith had a two-yard rushing touchdown, however, the Seahawks failed in the extra point attempt and took a 6–0 lead. Seattle stretched their lead to 9–0 by the end of the first quarter when John Leypoldt hit a 45-yard field goal. The Giants fought back in the second quarter, as Gary Shirk caught a three-yard touchdown pass from Craig Morton, cutting the Seahawks lead to 9–7. New York then took the lead when Gordon Bell ran for a two-yard touchdown, making the score 14–9 for the Giants at halftime. The Giants struck again to open the scoring in the third quarter, as Gordon Bell rushed for his second touchdown of the game, this time for 21 yards, as New York took a 21–9 lead. The Seahawks replied with their own rushing touchdown, as quarterback Jim Zorn rushed for seven yards into the Giants' end zone, cutting the New York lead to 21–16. The Giants put the game away in the fourth quarter, as Eric Marshall caught a nine-yard touchdown reception, making the final score 28–16 for New York.

The loss dropped the Seahawks to 2–10–0 on the season.

==== Week 13: vs. Chicago Bears ====
Week Thirteen: Seattle Seahawks vs. Chicago Bears – Game summary

Quarter	1	2	3	4	Total
Bears	0	6	21	7	34
Seahawks	0	7	0	0	7

at Kingdome, Seattle, Washington

- Date: December 5
- Game time: 1:02 pm local
- Game weather: indoors
- Game attendance: 60,510
- Referee: Jim Tunney
- TV announcers (CBS): Don Criqui and Sonny Jurgensen
- Gamebook

Game information

First quarter

- No scoring plays

Second quarter

- CHI – Johnny Musso 2-yard run (Bob Thomas kick is no good), 7:34 (CHI 6–0)
- SEA – John McMakin 14-yard pass from Jim Zorn (John Leypoldt kick), 3:42 (SEA 7–6)

Third quarter

- CHI – James Scott 63-yard pass from Bob Avellini (Bob Thomas kick), 7:29 (CHI 13–7)
- CHI – James Scott 30-yard pass from Bob Avellini (Bob Thomas kick), 5:42 (CHI 20–7)
- CHI – Roland Harper 39-yard pass from Bob Avellini (Bob Thomas kick), 4:38 (CHI 27–7)

Fourth quarter

- CHI – Randy Burks 55-yard pass from Virgil Carter (Bob Thomas kick), 1:39 (CHI 34–7)

Top passers

- CHI – Bob Avellini: 12/24, 209 yds, 3 TD, 1 INT
- SEA – Jim Zorn: 15/34, 188 yds, 1 TD, 3 INT

Top rushers

- CHI – Walter Payton: 27 car, 183 yds
- SEA – Sherman Smith: 15 car, 71 yds

Top receivers

- CHI – James Scott: 3 rec, 106 yds, 2 TD
- SEA – John McMakin: 3 rec, 54 yds, 1 TD

Team – pass – rush – total – to

- CHI – 250 – 259 – 509 – 1
- SEA – 181 – 105 – 286 – 5

The Seahawks final home game of the season was against the Chicago Bears, who entered the game with a 6–6–0 record. After a scoreless first quarter, the Bears opened the scoring when Johnny Musso rushed for two yards into the Seahawks end zone, however, Chicago failed on the extra point attempt to take a 6–0 lead. The Seahawks responded with their own touchdown, as John McMakin caught a 14-yard pass from Jim Zorn, giving Seattle a 7–6 lead at halftime. The Bears took control of the game in the third quarter, as James Scott had a 63-yard touchdown reception, followed by a 30-yard touchdown reception, both from quarterback Bob Avellini, giving the Bears a 20–7 lead. Before the quarter was over, Chicago took a 27–7 when Roland Harper had a 39-yard touchdown reception. In the fourth quarter, the Bears went up 34–7 when Randy Burks caught a 55-yard pass for a touchdown from Virgil Carter, as Chicago ended the game scoring 28 unanswered points.

The loss dropped Seattle to a record of 2–11–0.

==== Week 14: at Philadelphia Eagles ====
Week Fourteen: Seattle Seahawks at Philadelphia Eagles – Game summary

Quarter	1	2	3	4	Total
Seahawks	0	3	0	7	10
Eagles	7	7	10	3	27

at Veterans Stadium, Philadelphia, Pennsylvania

- Date: December 12
- Game time: 1:05 pm local
- Game weather: rain, 41 °F or 5 °C, 80% humidity, wind NW 5 miles per hour (8.0 km/h; 4.3 kn)
- Game attendance: 37,949
- Referee: Chuck Heberling
- TV announcers (CBS): Jim Thacker and Sonny Jurgensen
- Gamebook

Game information

First quarter

- PHI – Tom Sullivan 4-yard run (Horst Muhlmann kick), 1:22 (PHI 7–0)

Second quarter

- PHI – Tom Sullivan 1-yard rush (Horst Muhlmann kick), 6:13 (PHI 14–0)
- SEA – John Leypoldt 24-yard field goal, 3:38 (PHI 14–3)

Third quarter

- PHI – Horst Muhlmann 33-yard field goal, 6:03 (PHI 17–3)
- PHI – Charlie Smith 3-yard rush (Horst Muhlmann kick), 2:15 (PHI 24–3)

Fourth quarter

- PHI – Horst Muhlmann 37-yard field goal, 14:19 (PHI 27–3)
- SEA – Steve Largent 9-yard pass from Jim Zorn (John Leypoldt kick), 3:53 (PHI 27–10)

Top passers

- SEA – Jim Zorn: 24/49, 237 yds, 1 TD, 1 INT
- PHI – Roman Gabriel: 10/13, 121 yds

Top rushers

- SEA – Sherman Smith: 8 car, 43 yds
- PHI – Tom Sullivan: 23 car, 121 yds, 2 TD

Top receivers

- SEA – Steve Largent: 7 rec, 98 yds, 1 TD
- PHI – Harold Carmichael: 4 rec, 65 yds

Team – pass – rush – total – to

- SEA – 226 – 71 – 297 – 3
- PHI – 142 – 270 – 412 – 0

Seattle headed on the road for the final game of the season, as they faced the Philadelphia Eagles on a cold day at Veterans Stadium. The Eagles entered the game with a 3–10–0 record. Philadelphia scored the lone touchdown in the first quarter, as Tom Sullivan had a four-yard rush into the Seahawks' end zone to give the Eagles a 7–0 lead. In the second quarter, Sullivan rushed for his second touchdown, this time a one-yard rush at the goal line, as Philadelphia took a 14–0 lead. The Seahawks got on the scoreboard when John Leypoldt connected for a 24-yard field goal, as the score was 14–3 for the Eagles at halftime. The Eagles took a 17–3 lead in the third quarter as Horst Muhlmann had a 33-yard field goal, then Philadelphia took a 24–3 lead as Charlie Smith rushed for three yards into the Seattle end zone. In the fourth quarter, Muhlmann had his second field goal of the game, making the score 27–3 for Philadelphia. The Seahawks cut the lead to 27–10, as Steve Largent caught a nine-yard touchdown pass from Jim Zorn for the final score of the game.

The loss dropped the Seahawks' record to 2–12–0 for the season. It was also their last game as an NFC team for the next 26 years.

== Sources ==
- Neft, David S., Cohen, Richard M., and Korch, Rick. The Complete History of Professional Football from 1892 to the Present. New York: St. Martin's Press. 1994 ISBN 0-312-11435-4
