= 1976 Los Angeles Rams season =

NFL team season

- Owner: Carroll Rosenbloom
- Head coach: Chuck Knox
- Home stadium: Los Angeles Memorial Coliseum

Results
- Record: 10–3–1
- Division place: 1st NFC West
- Playoffs: Won Divisional Playoffs (at Cowboys) 14–12; Lost NFC Championship (at Vikings) 13–24

Uniform
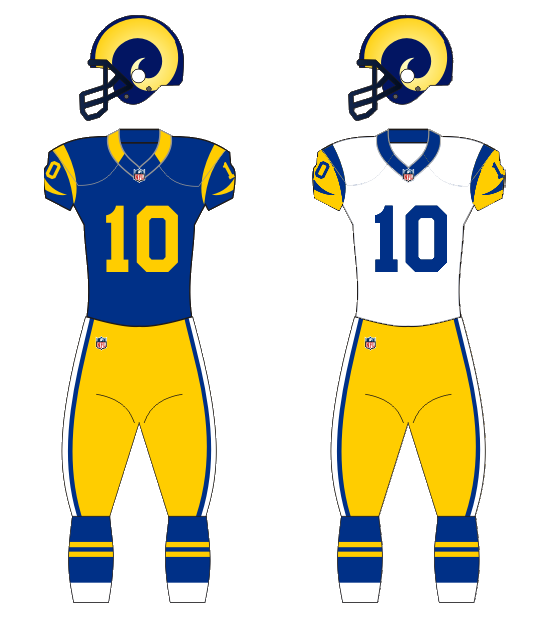

The 1976 Los Angeles Rams season was the team's 39th year with the National Football League (NFL) and the 31st season in Los Angeles. The Rams continued their dominance of the NFC West to win a fourth consecutive division title. After a record-setting previous season in which their defense was nearly untouchable, the Rams were picked by many to win the Super Bowl.

Despite not improving on its 12–2 record from 1975, the team continued to be one of the best in the NFL. This Rams team is quite notable for setting many records during the season, including the franchise record for points scored in a game (59) in a 59–0 shutout of the Atlanta Falcons in week thirteen. Los Angeles was 10–3–1 (.750) in the regular season; the tie (in overtime) came in week two at Minnesota (11–2–1) and expectedly became pivotal in the playoff seedings. The surprising shutout loss at home to rival San Francisco on Monday night in week five also contributed.

Third-seeded in the NFC and on the road in the playoffs, the Rams upset Dallas 14–12 in the divisional round, but lost 13–24 to the top-seeded Minnesota Vikings in the NFC Championship game.

This was the final year for the last member of the "Fearsome Foursome" defensive line of the 1960s; defensive tackle Merlin Olsen retired after fifteen NFL seasons, all with the Rams.

== Offseason ==
=== 1976 expansion draft ===
Los Angeles Rams selected during the expansion draft
Round	Overall	Name	Position	Expansion team
0	0	Ken Geddes	Linebacker	Seattle Seahawks
0	0	Eddie McMillan	Cornerback	Seattle Seahawks
0	0	Willie McGee	Wide receiver	Tampa Bay Buccaneers

=== NFL draft ===
1976 Los Angeles Rams draft
Round	Pick	Player	Position	College	Notes
1	26	Kevin McLain	Linebacker	Colorado State	
2	39	Pat Thomas *	Cornerback	Texas A&M	
2	53	Ron McCartney	Linebacker	Tennessee	
3	86	Jackie Slater * ^{†}	Tackle	Jackson State	
4	94	Gerald Taylor	Wide receiver	Texas A&I	
5	128	Carl Ekern	Linebacker	San Jose State	
5	150	Ken Bordelon	Defensive end	LSU	
5	155	Dwight Scales	Wide receiver	Grambling State	
7	207	Larry Buie	Defensive back	Mississippi State	
7	263	Jeb Church	Defensive back	Stanford	
10	288	Freeman Johns	Wide receiver	SMU	
11	316	Brian Nemeth	Tight end	South Carolina	
12	344	Jim Jodat	Running back	Carthage	
13	373	Steve Hamilton	Quarterback	Emporia State	
14	400	Al Burleson	Defensive back	Washington	
15	429	Malcolm Campbell	Wide receiver	Cal State Los Angeles	
16	456	Rick Gage		Arkansas Tech	
17	485	Gary Shaw	Defensive back	Brigham Young	
Made roster † Pro Football Hall of Fame * Made at least one Pro Bowl during career

== Personnel ==
=== Staff / Coaches ===
1976 Los Angeles Rams staff
Front Office: Owner – Carroll Rosenbloom; President / General Manager – Don Klosterman; Coaching Staff: Head coach - Chuck Knox; Offensive Coaches: Offensive Coordinator - Ken Meyer; Offensive Backfield Coach - Elijah Pitts; Offensive Line - Ray Prochaska; Receivers Coach - Leeman Bennett	Defensive Coaches: Defensive Coordinator - Ray Malavasi; Linebackers - Tom Catlin; Special Teams Coaches: None - N/A; Strength and Conditioning: None - N/A; Other Assistant Coaches: Training Assistant - Garrett Giemont; Advance Scott - Jack Faulkner

=== Roster ===
1976 Los Angeles Rams roster
Quarterbacks (QB): 11 Pat Haden; 12 James Harris; 16 Ron Jaworski; Running backs (RB): 45 Jim Bertelsen; 32 Cullen Bryant; 22 John Cappelletti; 30 Lawrence McCutcheon; 39 Rod Phillips; 33 Rob Scribner; Wide receivers (WR): 84 Tom Geredine; 29 Harold Jackson; 81 Ron Jessie; 87 Dwight Scales; Tight ends (TE): 80 Bob Klein; 83 Terry Nelson	Offensive linemen (OL): 77 Doug France T; 60 Dennis Harrah G; 63 Greg Horton G; 65 Tom Mack G; 54 Geoff Reece C; 61 Rich Saul C; 78 Jackie Slater T; 75 John Williams T; Defensive linemen (DL): 90 Larry Brooks DT; 89 Fred Dryer DE; 79 Mike Fanning DT; 76 Cody Jones DT; 74 Merlin Olsen DT; 85 Jack Youngblood DE	Linebackers (LB): 55 Carl Ekern MLB; 50 Kevin McLain OLB; 64 Jack Reynolds MLB; 58 Isiah Robertson OLB; 57 Mel Rogers OLB; 53 Jim Youngblood OLB; Defensive backs (DB): 42 Dave Elmendorf SS; 28 Monte Jackson CB; 49 Rod Perry CB; 20 Steve Preece FS; 48 Bill Simpson FS; 27 Pat Thomas CB; Special teams (ST): 10 Tom Dempsey K; 9 Rusty Jackson P	Reserve: 43 Jim Jodat RB (IR); 88 Freeman Johns WR (IR); 52 Rick Kay LB (IR); 56 Ron McCartney LB (IR); 51 Rick Nuzum C (IR); Rookies in italics

== Regular season ==
=== Schedule ===
Week	Date	Opponent	Result	Record	Venue	Attendance
1	September 12	at **Atlanta Falcons**	**W** 30–14	1–0	Atlanta–Fulton County Stadium	53,607
2	September 19	at Minnesota Vikings	**T** 10–10	1–0–1	Metropolitan Stadium	47,310
3	September 26	New York Giants	**W** 24–10	2–0–1	Los Angeles Memorial Coliseum	60,698
4	October 3	at Miami Dolphins	**W** 31–28	3–0–1	Miami Orange Bowl	60,753
5	October 11	**San Francisco 49ers**	**L** 0–16	3–1–1	Los Angeles Memorial Coliseum	80,532
6	October 17	Chicago Bears	**W** 20–12	4–1–1	Los Angeles Memorial Coliseum	71,751
7	October 24	at **New Orleans Saints**	**W** 16–10	5–1–1	Louisiana Superdome	51,984
8	October 31	**Seattle Seahawks**	**W** 45–6	6–1–1	Los Angeles Memorial Coliseum	52,035
9	November 7	at Cincinnati Bengals	**L** 12–20	6–2–1	Riverfront Stadium	52,480
10	November 14	St. Louis Cardinals	**L** 28–30	6–3–1	Los Angeles Memorial Coliseum	64,698
11	November 21	at **San Francisco 49ers**	**W** 23–3	7–3–1	Candlestick Park	58,573
12	November 28	**New Orleans Saints**	**W** 33–14	8–3–1	Los Angeles Memorial Coliseum	54,906
13	December 4	**Atlanta Falcons**	**W** 59–0	9–3–1	Los Angeles Memorial Coliseum	57,366
14	December 11	at Detroit Lions	**W** 20–17	10–3–1	Pontiac Municipal Stadium	73,470
Note: Intra-division opponents are in **bold** text.

=== Playoffs ===
Round	Date	Opponent (seed)	Result	Record	Venue	Attendance
Divisional	December 19	at Dallas Cowboys (2)	**W** 14–12	1–0	Texas Stadium	62,436
NFC Championship	December 26	at Minnesota Vikings (1)	**L** 13–24	1–1	Metropolitan Stadium	47,191

=== Standings ===
NFC West
	W	L	T	PCT	DIV	CONF	PF	PA	STK
Los Angeles Rams^{(3)}	10	3	1	.750	7–0	9–2–1	351	190	W4
San Francisco 49ers	8	6	0	.571	5–2	7–5	270	190	W1
New Orleans Saints	4	10	0	.286	2–5	3–8	253	346	L3
Atlanta Falcons	4	10	0	.286	2–5	4–8	172	312	L3
Seattle Seahawks	2	12	0	.143	1–3	1–12	229	429	L5
