= 1976 Atlanta Falcons season =

NFL team season

- Owner: Rankin M. Smith Sr.
- General manager: Pat Peppler
- Head coach: Marion Campbell (first 5 games; 1–4 record); Pat Peppler (interim; 3–6 record)
- Home stadium: Atlanta Stadium

Results
- Record: 4–10
- Division place: 3rd NFC West
- Playoffs: Did not qualify

The 1976 Atlanta Falcons season was the franchise's 11th year in the National Football League (NFL). The season saw the Falcons attempting to improve on their 4–10 record from 1975. However, they were only able to match the record, as they finished the 1976 season at 4–10 and missed the playoffs for the 11th straight season. After a 1–4 start to the season, head coach Marion Campbell was fired by general manager Pat Peppler, who himself would close out the season as the interim head coach and finish the season with a 3–6 record. The Falcons also suffered the ignominy of being the only established NFL team to lose to one of the league's two expansion teams when they lost 30–13 to the Seattle Seahawks on November 7.

For the season, the Falcons converted from gray facemasks to white facemasks.

== Offseason ==
=== 1976 expansion draft ===
Atlanta Falcons selected during the expansion draft
Round	Overall	Name	Position	Expansion team
0	0	Nick Bebout	Offensive tackle	Seattle Seahawks
0	0	Don Hansen	Linebacker	Seattle Seahawks
0	0	Vince Kendrick	Running back	Tampa Bay Buccaneers

=== Draft ===
1976 Atlanta Falcons draft
Round	Pick	Player	Position	College	Notes
1	9	Bubba Bean	Running back	Texas A&M	
2	36	Sonny Collins	Running back	Kentucky	
3	71	Dave Scott	Guard	Kansas	
4	102	Walt Brett	Defensive end	Montana	
6	169	Stan Varner	Defensive tackle	BYU	
7	193	Karl Farmer	Wide receiver	Pittsburgh	
8	219	Frank Reed	Cornerback	Washington	
9	246	Phil McKinnely	Offensive tackle	UCLA	
11	302	Chuck Brislin	Offensive tackle	Mississippi St	
12	329	Phil Bolton	Kicker	Montana St	
13	356	Mike Williams	Offensive tackle	Florida	
14	383	Mark Husfloen	Defensive end	Washington St	
15	414	Ron Olson	Defensive back	Washington	
16	441	Pat Curto	Linebacker	Ohio St	
17	468	Tony Green	Defensive back	Texas Tech	
Made roster † Pro Football Hall of Fame * Made at least one Pro Bowl during career

=== Undrafted free agents ===
1976 undrafted free agents of note
Player	Position	College
Angelo Wells	Defensive end	Morgan State

== Personnel ==
=== Staff / Coaches ===
1976 Atlanta Falcons staff
Front office: Chairman of the board – Rankin M. Smith Sr.; President – Frank E. Wall; General manager – Pat Peppler; Head coaches: Head coach – Marion Campbell; Offensive coaches: Offensive coordinator – Bill Nelsen; Receivers – Jimmy Orr; Offensive line – Bill Walsh	Defensive coaches: Defensive coordinator – Fred Bruney; Defensive line – Eddie Khayat; Linebackers – Marv Matuszak; Defensive backfield – Al Lavan

=== Roster ===
1976 Atlanta Falcons roster
Quarterbacks (QB): 16 Scott Hunter; 11 Kim McQuilken; Running backs (RB): 44 Bubba Bean; 41 Sonny Collins; 26 Mike Esposito; 24 Haskel Stanback; Wide receivers (WR): 89 Wallace Francis; 42 John Gilliam; 84 Alfred Jenkins; 82 Scott Piper; Tight ends (TE): 81 Bob Adams; 86 Jim Mitchell	Offensive linemen (OL): 62 Brent Adams T; 65 Len Gotshalk T; 63 Greg Kindle G; 68 Larron Jackson G; 73 Phil McKinnely T; 53 Paul Ryczek C; 70 Dave Scott G; 64 Royce Smith G; 58 Jim Weatherly C; Defensive linemen (DL): 77 Ron East DE; 71 Steve George DT; 87 Claude Humphrey DE; 69 Mike Lewis DT; 75 Jeff Merrow DE; 74 Mike Tilleman DT; 79 Jeff Yeates DE	Linebackers (LB): 50 Greg Brezina OLB; 51 Jim Cope MLB; 52 Dewey McClain OLB; 60 Tommy Nobis MLB; 55 Ralph Ortega OLB; 56 Guy Roberts OLB; Defensive backs (DB): 34 Ray Brown SS; 38 Rick Byas CB; 32 Ray Easterling FS; 40 Bob Jones FS; 22 Rolland Lawrence CB; 29 Ron Mabra CB; 28 Frank Reed CB; Special teams (ST): 6 John James P; 12 Nick Mike-Mayer K	Reserve: 72 Jim Bailey DT (IR); 10 Steve Bartkowski QB (IR); -- Walt Brett T/G (IR); 46 Monroe Eley RB (IR); 80 Karl Farmer WR (IR); 54 Fulton Kuykendall LB (IR); 88 Greg McCrary TE (IR); 48 Woody Thompson RB (IR); 57 Jeff Van Note C (IR); 78 Bill Windauer DT (IR); Rookies in italics 41 active, 10 reserve, 0 practice squad

== Regular season ==
=== Schedule ===
Week	Date	Opponent	Result	Record	Venue	Attendance
1	September 12	**Los Angeles Rams**	**L** 14–30	0–1	Atlanta–Fulton County Stadium	53,607
2	September 19	at Detroit Lions	**L** 10–24	0–2	Pontiac Metropolitan Stadium	50,840
3	September 26	at Chicago Bears	**W** 10–0	1–2	Soldier Field	41,029
4	October 3	Philadelphia Eagles	**L** 13–14	1–3	Atlanta–Fulton County Stadium	45,535
5	October 10	at **New Orleans Saints**	**L** 0–30	1–4	Louisiana Superdome	51,521
6	October 17	Cleveland Browns	**L** 17–20	1–5	Atlanta–Fulton County Stadium	33,364
7	October 23	at **San Francisco 49ers**	**L** 0–15	1–6	Candlestick Park	50,240
8	October 31	**New Orleans Saints**	**W** 23–20	2–6	Atlanta–Fulton County Stadium	34,127
9	November 7	at **Seattle Seahawks**	**L** 13–30	2–7	Kingdome	57,985
10	November 14	**San Francisco 49ers**	**W** 21–16	3–7	Atlanta–Fulton County Stadium	20,058
11	November 21	Dallas Cowboys	**W** 17–10	4–7	Atlanta–Fulton County Stadium	54,992
12	November 28	at Houston Oilers	**L** 14–20	4–8	Astrodome	25,838
13	December 4	at **Los Angeles Rams**	**L** 0–59	4–9	Los Angeles Memorial Coliseum	57,366
14	December 12	Green Bay Packers	**L** 20–24	4–10	Atlanta–Fulton County Stadium	23,436
Note: Intra-division opponents are in **bold** text.

=== Standings ===
NFC West
	W	L	T	PCT	DIV	CONF	PF	PA	STK
Los Angeles Rams^{(3)}	10	3	1	.750	7–0	9–2–1	351	190	W4
San Francisco 49ers	8	6	0	.571	5–2	7–5	270	190	W1
New Orleans Saints	4	10	0	.286	2–5	3–8	253	346	L3
Atlanta Falcons	4	10	0	.286	2–5	4–8	172	312	L3
Seattle Seahawks	2	12	0	.143	1–3	1–12	229	429	L5

=== Season summary ===
==== Week 2 at Lions ====
Week Two: Atlanta Falcons (0–1) at Detroit Lions (0–1)

Quarter	1	2	3	4	Total
Falcons	0	7	3	0	**10**
**Lions**	0	0	0	24	**24**

at Pontiac Metropolitan Stadium, Pontiac, Michigan

- Date: September 19, 1976
- Game time: 1:00 p.m.
- Game weather: Indoors (dome)
- Game attendance: 50,840
- Box Score

Game information

Second quarter

- ATL – Bubba Bean 5-yard run (Nick Mike-Mayer kick). Falcons 7–0. Drive:

Third quarter

- ATL – Nick Mike-Mayer 41-yard field goal. Falcons 10–0. Drive:

Fourth quarter

- DET – Greg Landry 5-yard run (Errol Mann kick). Falcons 10–7. Drive:
- DET – Errol Mann 32-yard field goal. Tie 10–10. Drive:
- DET – Ed O'Neil 32-yard pass from Joe Reed (Errol Mann kick). Lions 17–10. Drive:
- DET – James Hunter 39-yard interception return (Errol Mann kick). Lions 24–10.

Top passers

- ATL – Steve Bartkowski – 5/16, 59 yards, 3 INT
- DET – Joe Reed – 5/11, 78 yards, TD

Top rushers

- ATL – Bubba Bean – 22 rushes, 98 yards, TD
- DET – Dexter Bussey – 15 rushes, 79 yards

Top receivers

- ATL – Alfred Jenkins – 3 receptions, 47 yards
- DET – Horace King – 3 receptions, 33 yards
