= 1976 New Orleans Saints season =

NFL team season

- Owner: John W. Mecom Jr.
- Head coach: Hank Stram
- Home stadium: Louisiana Superdome

Results
- Record: 4–10
- Division place: 4th NFC West
- Playoffs: Did not qualify
- Pro Bowlers: None

The 1976 New Orleans Saints season was the Saints’ tenth year in the National Football League (NFL). Hoping past success could influence the franchise, the Saints hired Hank Stram as the new head coach. However, in Stram's first season at the helm, the Saints continued to struggle finishing with a 4–10 record.

The Saints made a uniform change before the year, going from a dark gold to old gold, and have retained the color albeit with minor shading changes since. It was also the team's first season wearing black pants, a move which was not unexpected, since Stram outfitted the Kansas City Chiefs in red pants beginning in 1968.

New Orleans' hopes for success was severely diminished before the season began when Stram learned star quarterback Archie Manning would not be able to play at all due to offseason elbow surgery. This forced Stram to alternate between longtime backup Bobby Scott and Chicago Bears castoff Bobby Douglass.

The high point of the season was in week three, when Stram’s Saints traveled to Kansas City and defeated the Chiefs 27–17. Stram rubbed salt in the wounds of the team he coached for 15 seasons (1960 to 1974) and led to the Super Bowl IV championship when Scott threw a touchdown pass on the game's final play to Tinker Owens. Chiefs coach Paul Wiggin refused to shake hands with Stram, who was carried off the Arrowhead Stadium turf by his players upon orders by the coach.

== Offseason ==
=== 1976 expansion draft ===
New Orleans Saints selected during the expansion draft
Round	Overall	Name	Position	Expansion team
0	0	Morris LaGrand	Running back	Tampa Bay Buccaneers
0	0	Joe Owens	Defensive end	Seattle Seahawks
0	0	Dave Thompson	Offensive tackle	Tampa Bay Buccaneers

=== NFL draft ===
1976 New Orleans Saints draft
Round	Pick	Player	Position	College	Notes
1	3	Chuck Muncie *	Running back	California	
2	32	Tony Galbreath	Running back	Missouri	
3	77	Bob Simmons	Guard	Texas	
4	95	Tinker Owens	Wide receiver	Oklahoma	
5	127	Scott Parrish	Offensive tackle	Utah State	
6	160	Terry Stieve	Guard	Wisconsin	
7	201	Ed Bauer	Guard	Notre Dame	
8	213	Craig Cassady	Defensive back	Ohio State	
9	240	Warren Peiffer	Defensive tackle	Iowa	
10	269	Junior Hardin	Linebacker	Eastern Kentucky	
11	294	Greg Kokal	Quarterback	Kent State	
12	323	Milton Butts	Offensive tackle	North Carolina	
Made roster * Made at least one Pro Bowl during career

== Personnel ==
=== Staff ===
1976 New Orleans Saints staff
Front office: President – John W. Mecom Jr.; Executive Vice President – Richard F. Gordon, Jr.; Vice President of Administration – Harry Hulmes; Business Manager and Treasurer – Eddie Jones; Head coaches: Vice President/Head Coach – Hank Stram; Offensive coaches: Quarterbacks – Dick Wood; Offensive Backfield – John Beake; Receivers – Sam Rutigliano; Offensive Line – Dick Stanfel	Defensive coaches: Defensive Line – Buck Buchanan; Linebackers – Doug Shively; Defensive Backfield – Jim Garrett; Special teams coaches: Special Teams – Whitey Campbell; Strength and conditioning: Strength and Conditioning – Alvin Roy

=== Roster ===
1976 New Orleans Saints roster
Quarterbacks (QB): 10 Bobby Douglass; 12 Bobby Scott; Running backs (RB): 34 Tony Galbreath; 32 Kim Jones; 28 Alvin Maxson; 25 Leon McQuay; 42 Chuck Muncie; 33 Mike Strachan; Wide receivers (WR): 80 Larry Burton; 87 Don Herrmann; 83 Tinker Owens; Tight ends (TE): 85 Henry Childs; 84 Paul Seal; 86 Jim Thaxton	Offensive linemen (OL): 56 Lee Gross C; 65 Jeff Hart T; 62 John Hill C; 76 Don Morrison T; 71 Kurt Schumacher G; 68 Terry Stieve G; 77 Marv Montgomery T; 79 Emanuel Zanders G; Defensive linemen (DL): 63 Steve Baumgartner DE; 69 Andy Dorris DE; 78 Elois Grooms DE; 74 Derland Moore DT; 75 Elex Price DT; 73 Jeff Winans DT	Linebackers (LB): 50 Ken Bordelon OLB; 51 Warren Capone OLB; 58 Joe Federspiel MLB; 55 Rick Kingrea MLB; 57 Jim Merlo OLB; 60 Greg Westbrooks OLB; Defensive backs (DB): 45 Pete Athas CB; 24 Chuck Crist SS; 30 Ernie Jackson CB; 22 Benny Johnson CB; 46 Jim Kearney FS; 37 Tom Myers FS; 29 Mo Spencer CB; Special teams (ST): 16 Tom Blanchard P; 15 Rich Szaro K	Reserve: 23 Craig Cassady S (IR); 24 Clarence Chapman CB (IR); 8 Archie Manning QB (IR); 88 Joel Parker WR (IR); 82 Bob Pollard DE (IR); 66 Tom Wickert T (IR); Rookies in italics

== Regular season ==
=== Schedule ===
Week	Date	Opponent	Result	Record	Venue	Attendance
1	September 12	Minnesota Vikings	**L** 9–40	0—1	Louisiana Superdome	58,156
2	September 19	Dallas Cowboys	**L** 6–24	0—2	Louisiana Superdome	61,413
3	September 26	at Kansas City Chiefs	**W** 27–17	1—2	Arrowhead Stadium	53,918
4	October 3	Houston Oilers	**L** 26–31	1—3	Louisiana Superdome	51,973
5	October 10	**Atlanta Falcons**	**W** 30–0	2—3	Louisiana Superdome	51,521
6	October 17	at **San Francisco 49ers**	**L** 3–33	2—4	Candlestick Park	43,160
7	October 24	**Los Angeles Rams**	**L** 10–16	2—5	Louisiana Superdome	51,984
8	October 31	at **Atlanta Falcons**	**L** 20–23	2—6	Atlanta–Fulton County Stadium	34,127
9	November 7	at Green Bay Packers	**L** 32–27	2—7	Milwaukee County Stadium	52,936
10	November 14	Detroit Lions	**W** 17–16	3—7	Louisiana Superdome	42,048
11	November 21	at **Seattle Seahawks**	**W** 51–27	4—7	Kingdome	61,865
12	November 28	at **Los Angeles Rams**	**L** 14–33	4—8	Los Angeles Memorial Coliseum	54,906
13	December 5	at New England Patriots	**L** 6–27	4—9	Schaefer Stadium	53,592
14	December 12	**San Francisco 49ers**	**L** 7–27	4—10	Louisiana Superdome	42,536
Note: Intra-division opponents are in **bold** text.

=== Standings ===
NFC West
	W	L	T	PCT	DIV	CONF	PF	PA	STK
Los Angeles Rams^{(3)}	10	3	1	.750	7–0	9–2–1	351	190	W4
San Francisco 49ers	8	6	0	.571	5–2	7–5	270	190	W1
New Orleans Saints	4	10	0	.286	2–5	3–8	253	346	L3
Atlanta Falcons	4	10	0	.286	2–5	4–8	172	312	L3
Seattle Seahawks	2	12	0	.143	1–3	1–12	229	429	L5
