= 1976 San Francisco 49ers season =

American football team season

- Owner: Josephine Morabito-Fox; Jane Morabito
- General manager: Louis Spadia
- Head coach: Monte Clark
- Home stadium: Candlestick Park

Results
- Record: 8–6
- Division place: 2nd NFC West
- Playoffs: Did not qualify
- Pro Bowlers: RB Delvin Williams; DT Cleveland Elam; DE Tommy Hart; LB Dave Washington

The 1976 San Francisco 49ers season was the franchise's 27th season in the National Football League and their 31st overall. The team had a new head coach in Monte Clark, who previously was an assistant coach of the Miami Dolphins, to replace Dick Nolan. They began the season with the goal of improving on their previous output of 5–9. They were able to do so, starting the season 6–1; however, after a four-game losing streak, they finished 8–6 and missed the playoffs. This would be the first, and only, season for Clark as head coach. He was let go during the 1977 off-season.

On April 5, 1976, the 49ers traded for former Heisman Trophy winner Jim Plunkett. The 49ers gave the New England Patriots their first round pick in the 1976 NFL draft, the Houston Oilers first round pick in the 1976 Draft, the 49ers first and second round picks in the 1977 NFL draft, and quarterback Tom Owen.

This would be the final season for the 49ers under the ownership of the family of team founder Tony Morabito, as prior to the 1977 season the team would be sold to Eddie DeBartolo Jr., heir to the DeBartolo real estate development business started by his father Edward J. DeBartolo Sr..

== Offseason ==
=== 1976 expansion draft ===
San Francisco 49ers selected during the expansion draft
Round	Overall	Name	Position	Expansion team
0	0	Wayne Baker	Defensive tackle	Seattle Seahawks
0	0	Manfred Moore	Running back	Tampa Bay Buccaneers
0	0	Bob Penchion	Guard	Seattle Seahawks

=== NFL draft ===
1976 San Francisco 49ers draft
Round	Pick	Player	Position	College	Notes
2	42	Randy Cross *	Guard	UCLA	
2	57	Eddie Lewis	Defensive back	Kansas	
4	100	Steve Rivera	Wide receiver	California	
5	140	Tony Leonard	Defensive back	Virginia Union	
6	168	Robert Pennywell	Linebacker	Grambling State	
6	177	Scott Bull	Quarterback	Arkansas	
7	194	Jay Chesley	Defensive back	Vanderbilt	
8	223	John Ayers	Guard	West Texas State	began play with 49ers in 1977.
9	250	Kenny Harrison	Wide receiver	SMU	
10	275	Robin Ross	Tackle	Washington State	
11	305	Paul Hofer	Running back	Ole Miss	
12	332	Gerald Loper	Guard	Florida	
13	359	Larry Brumfield	Defensive back	Indiana State	
14	389	Johnny Miller	Guard	Livingstone	played with the 49ers in 1977.
15	416	Howard Stidham	Linebacker	Tennessee Tech	played with the 49ers in 1977.
16	443	Reggie Lewis	Defensive end	San Diego State	
17	473	Darryl Jenkins	Running back	San Jose State	
Made roster * Made at least one Pro Bowl during career

== Personnel ==
=== Staff / Coaches ===
1976 San Francisco 49ers staff
Front office: Co-Owner and President – Josephine Morabito-Fox & Jane Morabito; General manager / Team President – Louis Spadia; Head coaches: Head coach – Monte Clark; Offensive coaches: Quarterbacks / Wide Receivers – Doug Gerhart; Running Backs – Jim Spavital; Offensive Line – Dick Enright	Defensive coaches: Defensive Line – Floyd Peters; Linebackers – Ed Beard; Defensive Backfield / Secondary – Billy Atkins; Special teams coaches: Special Teams – Ed Alsman

=== Roster ===
1976 San Francisco 49ers roster
Quarterbacks (QB): 19 Scott Bull; 14 Marty Domres; 16 Jim Plunkett; Running backs (RB): 38 Bob Ferrell; 36 Paul Hofer; 40 Wilbur Jackson; 47 Kermit Johnson; 24 Delvin Williams; Wide receivers (WR): 83 Kenny Harrison; 87 Jim Lash; 80 Steve Rivera; 18 Gene Washington; Tight ends (TE): 84 Tom Mitchell; 89 Jim Obradovich	Offensive linemen (OL): 79 Cas Banaszek T; 77 Jean Barrett T; 51 Randy Cross C; 71 Keith Fahnhorst T; 65 Steve Lawson G; 61 Andy Maurer G; 63 Rocky Rasley G; 67 John Watson C/G; Defensive linemen (DL): 82 Tony Cline DE; 76 Bill Cooke DE/DT; 72 Cleveland Elam DE; 53 Tommy Hart DE; 60 Bill Sandifer DE/DT; 74 Jimmy Webb DT	Linebackers (LB): 55 Bruce Elia MLB; 59 Willie Harper OLB; 64 Dale Mitchell OLB; 57 Frank Nunley MLB; 52 Skip Vanderbundt OLB; 50 Dave Washington OLB; Defensive backs (DB): 37 Jimmy Johnson CB; 42 Tony Leonard CB; 22 Eddie Lewis CB; 49 Ralph McGill FS; 32 Mel Phillips SS; 23 Bruce Rhodes FS; 44 Bruce Taylor CB; Special teams (ST): 10 Steve Mike-Mayer K; 13 Tom Wittum P	Reserve: 68 John Ayers G (IR); 86 Cedrick Hardman DE (IR); 85 John Kelsey TE (IR); 81 Willie McGee WR (IR); 66 Johnny Miller G (IR); 69 Woody Peoples G (IR); Rookies in italics

== Preseason ==
Week	Date	Opponent	Result	Record	Venue	Attendance
1	August 1	at Seattle Seahawks	W 27–20	1–0	Kingdome	60,825
2	August 8	Denver Broncos	W 17–7	2–0	Candlestick Park	40,052
3	August 15	Kansas City Chiefs	W 21–13	3–0	Candlestick Park	36,101
4	August 21	vs. San Diego Chargers	W 17–14	4–0	Aloha Stadium	36,364
5	August 29	Oakland Raiders	L 9–14	4–1	Candlestick Park	52,704
6	September 4	at Los Angeles Rams	L3–10	4–2	Los Angeles Memorial Coliseum	55,256

== Schedule ==
Week	Date	Opponent	Result	Record	Venue	Attendance
1	September 12	at Green Bay Packers	**W** 26–14	1–0	Lambeau Field	54,628
2	September 19	Chicago Bears	**L** 12–19	1–1	Candlestick Park	44,158
3	September 26	at Seattle Seahawks	**W** 37–21	2–1	Kingdome	59,108
4	October 3	New York Jets	**W** 17–6	3–1	Candlestick Park	42,691
5	October 11	at **Los Angeles Rams**	**W** 16–0	4–1	Los Angeles Memorial Coliseum	80,532
6	October 17	**New Orleans Saints**	**W** 33–3	5–1	Candlestick Park	43,160
7	October 23	**Atlanta Falcons**	**W** 15–0	6–1	Candlestick Park	50,240
8	October 31	at St. Louis Cardinals	**L** 20–23 (OT)	6–2	Busch Memorial Stadium	50,365
9	November 7	Washington Redskins	**L** 21–24	6–3	Candlestick Park	56,134
10	November 14	at **Atlanta Falcons**	**L** 16–21	6–4	Atlanta–Fulton County Stadium	20,058
11	November 21	**Los Angeles Rams**	**L** 3–23	6–5	Candlestick Park	58,573
12	November 29	Minnesota Vikings	**W** 20–16	7–5	Candlestick Park	56,775
13	December 5	at San Diego Chargers	**L** 7–13 (OT)	7–6	San Diego Stadium	33,539
14	December 12	at **New Orleans Saints**	**W** 27–7	8–6	Louisiana Superdome	42,536
Note: Intra-division opponents are in **bold** text.

=== Standings ===
NFC West
	W	L	T	PCT	DIV	CONF	PF	PA	STK
Los Angeles Rams^{(3)}	10	3	1	.750	7–0	9–2–1	351	190	W4
San Francisco 49ers	8	6	0	.571	5–2	7–5	270	190	W1
New Orleans Saints	4	10	0	.286	2–5	3–8	253	346	L3
Atlanta Falcons	4	10	0	.286	2–5	4–8	172	312	L3
Seattle Seahawks	2	12	0	.143	1–3	1–12	229	429	L5
