= Rolly Woolsey =

American football player (born 1953)

No. 45, 25, 44
- Position: Cornerback

Personal information
- Born: August 11, 1953 (age 73); Provo, Utah, U.S.
- Listed height: 6 ft 1 in (1.85 m)
- Listed weight: 182 lb (83 kg)

Career information
- High school: Grand View (ID)
- College: Boise State
- NFL draft: 1975: 6th round, 148th overall pick

Career history
- Dallas Cowboys (1975); Seattle Seahawks (1976); Cleveland Browns (1977); St. Louis Cardinals (1978)

Awards and highlights
- All-Big Sky (1974)

Career NFL statistics
- Games played - started: 44 - 11
- Interceptions: 5
- Stats at Pro Football Reference

Roland Bert Woolsey (born August 11, 1953) is an American former professional football player who was a cornerback in the National Football League (NFL) for the Dallas Cowboys, Seattle Seahawks, Cleveland Browns, and St. Louis Cardinals. He was selected by the Dallas Cowboys in the sixth round of the 1975 NFL draft. He played college football for the Boise State Broncos.

== Early life ==
Born in Provo, Utah, Woolsey was raised in Grand View, Idaho, attended Grand View High School, where he competed in track, eight-man football, and basketball.

He received a track scholarship to Boise State University, but eventually made his way to the Broncos football team, where he became a starter at safety and received All-Big Sky honors in 1974, after recording 72 tackles, 6 interceptions (led the team) and leading his team in punt returns. In track he set school records in the 220-yard dash, the 440-yard dash and the spring and mile relay teams.

In 1988, he was inducted into the BSU Hall of Fame. Sports Illustrated named him one of the greatest Idaho athletes of the 20th century.

== Professional career ==
=== Dallas Cowboys ===
Woolsey was selected by the Dallas Cowboys in the sixth round (148th overall) of the 1975 NFL draft, also known as the Dirty Dozen draft. As a rookie, he was used mainly on special teams and became the first Boise State graduate to play in a Super Bowl.

=== Seattle Seahawks ===
The Seattle Seahawks selected him from the Cowboys roster in the 1976 NFL expansion draft. He missed four pre-season games with a knee injury, but was able to play in 14 games (11 starts), registering 59 tackles and 4 interceptions (tied for the team lead). His play was affected after never fully recovering from his previous knee injury and was waived on August 29, 1977.

=== Cleveland Browns ===
On September 14, 1977, he was signed by the Cleveland Browns. He was one of the NFL's leading punt returners with 32 returns for 290 yards, but was released on August 22, 1978.

=== St. Louis Cardinals ===
On December 8, 1978, he was signed by the St. Louis Cardinals and played in 2 games as a returner on special teams. He retired after the season.
