= Hugh McKinnis =

American gridiron football player (born 1948)

No. 37
- Position: Running back

Personal information
- Born: June 9, 1948 (age 78); Sharon, Pennsylvania, U.S.
- Listed height: 6 ft 0 in (1.83 m)
- Listed weight: 225 lb (102 kg)

Career information
- College: Arizona State
- NFL draft: 1972: 8th round, 201st overall pick

Career history
- Calgary Stampeders (1970–1972); Cleveland Browns (1973–1975); Seattle Seahawks (1976); BC Lions (1977)

Awards and highlights
- Grey Cup champion (1971); Eddie James Memorial Trophy (1970); CFL All-Star (1970); CFL West All-Star (1970)

Career NFL statistics
- Rushing attempts: 269
- Rushing yards: 960
- Rushing TDs: 10
- Stats at Pro Football Reference

Hugh Lee McKinnis Jr. (born June 6, 1948) is an American former professional football player who played three Canadian Football League (CFL) seasons from 1970 to 1972 for the Calgary Stampeders and four National Football League (NFL) seasons from 1973 to 1976 for the Cleveland Browns and Seattle Seahawks.
