= Rich Szaro =

Polish player of American football (1948–2015)

Profile
- Position: Placekicker

Personal information
- Born: March 7, 1948; Rzeszów, Poland
- Died: April 7, 2015 (aged 67); Warsaw, Poland

Career information
- College: Harvard University

Career history
- 1974: Philadelphia Bell
- 1975–1978: New Orleans Saints
- 1979: New York Jets
- Stats at Pro Football Reference

Ryszard "Rich" Szaro (March 7, 1948 – April 7, 2015) was a Polish-born professional American football player who played placekicker for six seasons for the Philadelphia Bell of the WFL, New Orleans Saints and New York Jets.

Szaro moved with his family at age 14 to the United States in 1962 settling in Brooklyn, New York and studying at St. Francis Preparatory School in Queens, NY. A natural athlete, he ran track and played football, tennis, soccer and volleyball. As a senior. the 5'11" 185lb. running back and kicker broke the New York City single season scoring record with 164 points. Szaro was named a Parade All-American, and later was inducted in the school’s Inaugural Ring of Honor.

After graduating from Harvard University in 1971 with a degree in economics Szaro participated in a track meet in Paris, and he decided to stay in Europe and work as an export manager for Colgate-Palmolive. However, he missed playing football and saw other foreign- born soccer-style kickers making NFL rosters including fellow Pole, Chester Marcol of the Green Bay Packers. He returned to the USA in 1974 to pursue a career in Professional Football.

After his playing career, Szaro returned to international trade with a clothing firm based in New York but traveling extensively throughout South America, Europe, and the Far East. He was very adept at fitting in with other cultures helped by the fact that he spoke six languages, and his English had barely a trace of an accent. Szaro worked as liaison between skilled Jewish professionals emigrating from Russia and American businesses, many emigrants whom he placed through Harvard connections.

Szaro returned to Poland to live and work in the 1990s. He died in at his home in Warsaw at the age of 67.

== College career ==
Szaro was recruited by numerous colleges, but after getting a pitch from Senator Robert F. Kennedy he chose Harvard University. As a freshman, Szaro broke the school record for season points (56), was second in rushing with 487 yards (averaging 6.3 yards a carry), and as the team's punter averaged 34.1 yards a kick. Szaro competed in outdoor track that spring breaking the school and New York javelin record with a toss of 246' 7". When a foot injury in his sophomore year hampered his running ability, he focused on place kicking setting two Harvard records for career points in place-kicking in the next three years. He led the team in scoring in 1969 and was selected All-Ivy League in his senior year.

== Professional career ==
When Szaro returned to the United States from working in Europe, he initially signed with the Philadelphia Bell of the WFL in 1974 before being signed by the New Orleans Saints in 1975. His best year was 1976, when he led the NFL in field goal accuracy, making 78 percent of his attempts. Szaro was a left-footed kicker, but could kick almost as well with his right foot. He once made a right-footed field goal in a 1978 game against the Cleveland Browns when an injury prevented him from swinging his left foot.

Szaro was cut by the Saints after the team selected Russell Erxleben in the first round of the 1979 NFL draft. Erxleben was a combination place-kicker and punter for Texas, and New Orleans hoped to free up a roster spot by having just one specialist.

He ended his career in 1979 after a short stint with the New York Jets, bothered by persistent injuries with his foot and hamstring he retired from football to pursue business interests.

== Professional statistics ==
Year	Team	GP	Kicking							
Year	Team	GP	FGA	FGM	Pct	Lng	XPA	XPM	Pct	Pts
1974	PHI	4	7	2	28.6	—	0	0	100.0	6
1975	NO	11	16	10	62.5	50	17	17	100.0	47
1976	NO	14	23	18	78.3	50	29	25	86.2	79
1977	NO	14	12	5	41.7	31	31	29	93.5	44
1978	NO	4	6	4	66.7	37	9	9	100.0	21
1979	NYJ	1	2	0	0.0	—	2	2	100.0	2
Total		48	66	39	59.1	50	88	82	93.2	199
Source: Pro Football Reference
