= 1976 Dallas Cowboys season =

NFL team season

- Owner: Clint Murchison Jr.
- General manager: Tex Schramm
- Head coach: Tom Landry
- Home stadium: Texas Stadium

Results
- Record: 11–3
- Division place: 1st NFC East
- Playoffs: Lost Divisional Playoffs (vs. Rams) 12–14

The 1976 Dallas Cowboys season was their 17th in the National Football League. The team improved on their previous output of 10–4, winning eleven games. They qualified for the playoffs, but were defeated by the Los Angeles Rams with a score of 14–12 in the divisional round.

== Offseason ==
=== 1976 expansion draft ===
Dallas Cowboys selected during the expansion draft
| Round | Overall | Name | Position | Expansion team |
|---|---|---|---|---|
| 0 | 0 | Ron Howard | Tight end | Seattle Seahawks |
| 0 | 0 | Cal Peterson | Linebacker | Tampa Bay Buccaneers |
| 0 | 0 | Rolly Woolsey | Cornerback | Seattle Seahawks |

=== NFL draft ===
1976 Dallas Cowboys draft
| Round | Pick | Player | Position | College | Notes |
| 1 | 27 | Aaron Kyle | CB | Wyoming | |
| 2 | 40 | Jim Jensen | RB | Iowa | |
| 2 | 55 | Jim Eidson | OG | Mississippi State | |
| 3 | 73 | Duke Fergerson | WR | San Diego State | |
| 3 | 75 | John Smith | RB | Boise State | |
| 3 | 87 | Butch Johnson | WR | California-Riverside | |
| 4 | 119 | Tom Rafferty | OG | Penn State | |
| 5 | 151 | Wally Pesuit | OT | Kentucky | |
| 6 | 181 | Greg McGuire | OT | Indiana | |
| 7 | 186 | Greg Schaum | DT | Michigan State | |
| 7 | 208 | David Williams | RB | Colorado | |
| 8 | 236 | Henry Laws | DB | South Carolina | |
| 9 | 264 | Beasley Reece | DB | North Texas State | |
| 10 | 290 | Leroy Cook | DE | Alabama | |
| 11 | 308 | Cornelius Greene | QB | Ohio State | |
| 12 | 346 | Charles McShane | LB | California Lutheran | |
| 13 | 374 | Mark Driscoll | QB | Colorado State | |
| 14 | 402 | Larry Mushinskie | TE | Nebraska | |
| 15 | 430 | Dale Curry | LB | UCLA | |
| 16 | 458 | Rick Costanzo | OT | Nebraska | |
| 17 | 486 | Stan Woodfill | K | Oregon | |
Made roster † Pro Football Hall of Fame * Made at least one Pro Bowl during career

== Roster ==
Dallas Cowboys 1976 roster
| Quarterbacks: 12 Roger Staubach; Running backs: 21 Doug Dennison; 37 Jim Jensen; 35 Scott Laidlaw; 44 Robert Newhouse; 26 Preston Pearson; 30 Charley Young; Wide receivers: 86 Butch Johnson; 88 Drew Pearson; 82 Beasley Reece; 83 Golden Richards; Tight ends: 89 Billy Joe DuPree; 87 Jay Saldi | Offensive linemen: 67 Pat Donovan T; 52 Jim Eidson T; 62 John Fitzgerald C; 66 Burton Lawless G; 73 Ralph Neely T; 61 Blaine Nye G; 64 Tom Rafferty G/C; 68 Herbert Scott G; 70 Rayfield Wright T; Defensive linemen: 63 Larry Cole DT; 77 Bill Gregory DT; 72 Ed Jones DE; 79 Harvey Martin DE; 75 Jethro Pugh DT; 78 Greg Schaum DE | Linebackers: 53 Bob Breunig OLB; 58 Mike Hegman OLB; 56 Thomas Henderson OLB; 55 Lee Roy Jordan MLB; 50 D. D. Lewis OLB; 54 Randy White MLB; Defensive backs: 31 Benny Barnes CB; 43 Cliff Harris FS; 42 Randy Hughes FS; 25 Aaron Kyle CB; 20 Mel Renfro CB; 46 Mark Washington CB; 41 Charlie Waters SS; Special teams: 1 Efrén Herrera K; 11 Danny White P/QB | Reserve lists: 57 Kyle Davis C (IR); -- Duke Fergerson WR (IR); 81 Percy Howard WR (IR); 40 John Smith RB (IR); Rookies in italics 43 active, 4 inactive |

== Schedule ==
| Week | Date | Opponent | Result | Record | Game Site | Attendance | Recap |
|---|---|---|---|---|---|---|---|
| 1 | September 12 | **Philadelphia Eagles** | **W** 27–7 | 1–0 | Texas Stadium | 54,052 | Recap |
| 2 | September 19 | at New Orleans Saints | **W** 24–6 | 2–0 | Louisiana Superdome | 61,413 | Recap |
| 3 | September 26 | Baltimore Colts | **W** 30–27 | 3–0 | Texas Stadium | 64,237 | Recap |
| 4 | October 3 | at Seattle Seahawks | **W** 28–13 | 4–0 | Kingdome | 62,027 | Recap |
| 5 | October 10 | at **New York Giants** | **W** 24–14 | 5–0 | Giants Stadium | 76,042 | Recap |
| 6 | October 17 | at **St. Louis Cardinals** | **L** 17–21 | 5–1 | Busch Memorial Stadium | 50,317 | Recap |
| 7 | October 24 | Chicago Bears | **W** 31–21 | 6–1 | Texas Stadium | 61,346 | Recap |
| 8 | October 31 | at **Washington Redskins** | **W** 20–7 | 7–1 | RFK Stadium | 55,004 | Recap |
| 9 | November 7 | **New York Giants** | **W** 9–3 | 8–1 | Texas Stadium | 58,870 | Recap |
| 10 | November 15 | Buffalo Bills | **W** 17–10 | 9–1 | Texas Stadium | 51,799 | Recap |
| 11 | November 21 | at Atlanta Falcons | **L** 10–17 | 9–2 | Atlanta–Fulton County Stadium | 54,992 | Recap |
| 12 | November 25 | **St. Louis Cardinals** | **W** 19–14 | 10–2 | Texas Stadium | 62,498 | Recap |
| 13 | December 5 | at **Philadelphia Eagles** | **W** 26–7 | 11–2 | Veterans Stadium | 55,072 | Recap |
| 14 | December 12 | **Washington Redskins** | **L** 14–27 | 11–3 | Texas Stadium | 59,916 | Recap |

Division opponents are in bold text

== Playoffs ==
| Round | Date | Opponent | Result | Game Site | Attendance | Recap |
|---|---|---|---|---|---|---|
| Divisional | December 19, 1976 | Los Angeles Rams (3) | L 12–14 | Texas Stadium | 62,436 | Recap |

== Standings ==
NFC East
| | W | L | T | PCT | DIV | CONF | PF | PA | STK |
|---|---|---|---|---|---|---|---|---|---|
| Dallas Cowboys^{(2)} | 11 | 3 | 0 | .786 | 6–2 | 9–3 | 296 | 194 | L1 |
| Washington Redskins^{(4)} | 10 | 4 | 0 | .714 | 6–2 | 9–3 | 291 | 217 | W4 |
| St. Louis Cardinals | 10 | 4 | 0 | .714 | 5–3 | 9–3 | 309 | 267 | W2 |
| Philadelphia Eagles | 4 | 10 | 0 | .286 | 2–6 | 4–8 | 165 | 286 | W1 |
| New York Giants | 3 | 11 | 0 | .214 | 1–7 | 3–9 | 170 | 250 | L1 |

== Season recap ==
The Cowboys entered the year with high expectations, dominating the regular season by finishing with an 11-3 record, while capturing the NFC East title. But they came up short in the first round of the divisional playoffs, after being heavily favored at home against the Los Angeles Rams, but still losing 14–12.

== Publications ==
The Football Encyclopedia ISBN 0-312-11435-4
Total Football ISBN 0-06-270170-3
Cowboys Have Always Been My Heroes ISBN 0-446-51950-2
