= Randy Coffield =

American football player (born 1953)

No. 52, 59
- Position: Linebacker

Personal information
- Born: December 12, 1953 (age 72); Miami, Florida, U.S.
- Listed height: 6 ft 4 in (1.93 m)
- Listed weight: 215 lb (98 kg)

Career information
- High school: Hialeah (FL)
- College: Florida State
- NFL draft: 1976: 10th round, 266th overall pick

Career history
- Seattle Seahawks (1976); New York Giants (1978–1979)
- Stats at Pro Football Reference

Randall Steve Coffield (born December 12, 1953) is an American former professional football player who was a linebacker for three seasons with the Seattle Seahawks and New York Giants of the National Football League (NFL) from 1976 to 1979. He played college football for the Florida State Seminoles.
