= Jim Eidson =

American football player (born 1954)

No. 52
- Position: Offensive guard

Personal information
- Born: May 10, 1954 (age 72); Anderson, South Carolina, U.S.
- Listed height: 6 ft 4 in (1.93 m)
- Listed weight: 264 lb (120 kg)

Career information
- High school: Morgan County (AL)
- College: Mississippi State
- NFL draft: 1976: 2nd round, 55th overall pick

Career history
- Dallas Cowboys (1976–1977)

Awards and highlights
- Super Bowl champion (XII)

Career NFL statistics
- Games played: 9
- Stats at Pro Football Reference

James Milton Eidson (born May 10, 1954) is an American former professional football player who was a guard for the Dallas Cowboys of the National Football League (NFL). He played college football for the Mississippi State Bulldogs.

== Early life ==
Eidson attended Morgan County High School (now Hartselle), where he practiced football, golf, shot put and the discus throw. In football, he was a two-way player at tackle.

He accepted a football scholarship from Mississippi State University. He was a defensive tackle, but was demoted from starter to the scout team as a sophomore.

In 1974, he was converted into an offensive tackle when head coach Bob Tyler installed the veer offense. He started 23 consecutive games at right tackle, receiving honorable-mention All-SEC honors in 1974 & 1975. Jim Eidson was voted “Most Valuable Senior Player” by the Jackson Touchdown Club following his senior season in 1975. He was selected for Blue Gray game, East West Shrine Classic, Senior Bowl, American Football Coaches All American game, and the Chicago Tribune College All Star Game. Eidson was called “the best offensive lineman I coached in college” by his MSU offensive line coach and Mississippi Sports Hall of Fame and MSU M Club Sports Hall of Fame member Tom Goode.

In 2009, he was inducted into the Morgan County Sports Hall of Fame, and in 2011 he was inducted into the Hartselle Tiger Football Hall of Fame.

== Professional career ==
Jim Eidson was the first SEC offensive lineman selected in the 1976 NFL draft. Eidson was selected by the Dallas Cowboys in the second round (55th overall) of the 1976 NFL draft, with the intention of switching him to offensive guard. As a rookie, he was a backup guard and center, playing in 9 games and was a part of the Super Bowl XII championship team.

In 1977, he suffered a jammed neck during a training camp blocking drill against defensive end Ed "Too Tall" Jones and experienced temporary paralysis. In the preseason, he also had a knee injury against the Houston Oilers that placed him on the injured reserve list. In 1978, he suffered a second sprained neck injury in preseason and was diagnosed with a spinal cord condition (spinal stenosis), which forced him into early retirement.

== Personal life ==
Eidson married Jana Beth Scoggins in 1979 and they have three children: Taylor, Grant, and Savannah. Eidson went on to earn his MBA from Southern Methodist University's Cox School of Business and was elected to Beta Gamma Sigma academic honor society. He became the president of Precedent Equities LLC, a real estate company in Dallas, Texas.
