= Don Bitterlich =

American football player (born 1954)

No. 4
- Position: Placekicker

Personal information
- Born: January 5, 1954 (age 72); Warminster, Pennsylvania, U.S.
- Listed height: 5 ft 7 in (1.70 m)
- Listed weight: 166 lb (75 kg)

Career information
- High school: William Tennent (Warminster)
- College: Temple
- NFL draft: 1976: 3rd round, 92nd overall pick

Career history
- Seattle Seahawks (1976)

Career NFL statistics
- Field goals: 1
- Field goal attempts: 4
- Field goal %: 0.25
- Longest field goal: 27
- Stats at Pro Football Reference

Donald Bitterlich (born January 5, 1954) is an American former professional football player who was a placekicker for the Seattle Seahawks of the National Football League (NFL). He played college football for the Temple Owls. Bitterlich kicked the first field goal in the expansion Seahawks history, also the first points ever scored by a Seahawks player.

== College career ==
A graduate of William Tennent High School, Bitterlich was scouted by Temple Owls football head coach Wayne Hardin during his junior year. During his first tryout with the team, Bitterlich left early as he was scheduled to play accordion in a musical performance at Vitale's Restaurant in Bustleton, Philadelphia. He attended the school with a soccer scholarship, and wanted to major in music, but as athletes were prohibited from doing so, he majored in civil engineering. With the Owls, Bitterlich set six NCAA records. In 1974, Bitterlich was second in the nation for points scored on kicks. The next year, Bitterlich set the record for the longest field goal in Temple history, with a 56-yard field goal. During the year, against Drake, he also broke the NCAA record for the most consecutive conversions with 82, along with tying the NCAA record of for total kicking points with 84. He was inducted into the Temple Sports Hall of Fame in 2007.

== Professional career ==
Bitterlich was selected with in the third round of the 1976 NFL draft by the Seahawks with the 92nd overall pick, the final selection of the round. In the team's first game against the St. Louis Cardinals, Bitterlich scored the first points in Seahawks history with a 27-yard field goal. However, he would miss three kicks later in the season against the San Francisco 49ers, and was released after three games. After being released by the Seahawks, Bitterlich tried out with the Philadelphia Eagles and two other teams, but was not signed.

== Personal life ==
Bitterlich has a German ancestry. Bitterlich is currently a project manager for the Daniel J. Keating Company. Bitterlich is also an accordionist, an instrument he had been playing since he was 7. A Christian, Bitterlich was a Sunday school teacher for 27 years. He and his wife, Ellen, have two daughters: Lisa, a Fellowship of Christian Athletes missionary, and Elizabeth, a J.Crew Boston store manager.
