= John McMakin =

American football player (born 1950)

No. 89, 81
- Position: Tight end

Personal information
- Born: September 24, 1950 (age 76); Spartanburg, South Carolina, U.S.
- Listed height: 6 ft 3 in (1.91 m)
- Listed weight: 232 lb (105 kg)

Career information
- High school: Tucker (Tucker, Georgia)
- College: Clemson
- NFL draft: 1972: 3rd round, 63rd overall pick

Career history
- Pittsburgh Steelers (1972–1974); Detroit Lions (1975); Seattle Seahawks (1976)

Awards and highlights
- Super Bowl champion (IX); First-team All-ACC (1971)

Career NFL statistics
- Receptions: 45
- Receiving yards: 673
- Receiving touchdowns: 4
- Stats at Pro Football Reference

John Garvin McMakin (born September 24, 1950) is an American former professional football player who was a tight end for five seasons in the National Football League (NFL) from 1972 to 1976 for the Pittsburgh Steelers, Detroit Lions and Seattle Seahawks. He was a member of the Steelers first World Championship, Super Bowl IX over the Minnesota Vikings. He played college football for the Clemson Tigers and was selected 63rd overall as the Steelers' third round draft pick in the 1972 NFL draft.

McMakin played a role in one of the most famous plays in football history, the Immaculate Reception. In a 1972 playoff game between the Steelers and Oakland Raiders, the Raiders were leading 7–6 with a few seconds left. Steelers quarterback Terry Bradshaw threw a pass to John Fuqua that deflected off either Fuqua, Raider safety Jack Tatum or both, and was caught by Steeler running back Franco Harris who ran for the winning touchdown. The main controversy of the play was whether ball hit Tatum or not; under the rules of the time Harris' catch would have been illegal if it had not. But another point of controversy was McMakin's block from behind on Raider linebacker Phil Villapiano which helped free Harris for the touchdown. Villapiano has always maintained that the block was an illegal clip and so even if the catch was legal the touchdown should have been called back. But that's not all of his big plays. He also caught a 78-yard touchdown pass against the Cleveland Browns and another game-sealing touchdown against his eventual team, the Detroit Lions.

McMakin's pro career ended when he was waived by the Seahawks prior to the 1977 season after the Seahawks acquired tight end John Sawyer from the Houston Oilers.

McMakin's brother, David, was a safety for the University of Alabama from 1971 to 1973 under Paul "Bear" Bryant. His grandfather, John McMakin (baseball), was a pitcher for the Brooklyn Superbas in 1902. His father's cousin, Albert McMakin, was a strong childhood friend of Billy Graham, convincing him to go see Mordecai Ham which brought Mr. Graham to Jesus.
