= Tony Leonard (American football) =

American football player (born 1953)

No. 42, 26
- Position: Cornerback

Personal information
- Born: February 28, 1953 (age 73); Richmond, Virginia, U.S.
- Listed height: 5 ft 11 in (1.80 m)
- Listed weight: 170 lb (77 kg)

Career information
- High school: Maggie L. Walker (Richmond)
- College: Virginia Union
- NFL draft: 1976: 5th round, 140th overall pick

Career history
- San Francisco 49ers (1976–1978); Detroit Lions (1978-1979)

Career NFL statistics
- Interceptions: 5
- Fumble recoveries: 5
- Total TDs: 2
- Stats at Pro Football Reference

Anthony Leonard (born February 28, 1953) is an American former professional football player who was a cornerback and return specialist in the National Football League (NFL). He played college football for the Virginia Union Panthers. He played in the NFL from 1976 to 1979 for the San Francisco 49ers and Detroit Lions.
