= Tom Geredine =

American football player (born 1950)

No. 84, 87
- Position: Wide receiver

Personal information
- Born: June 17, 1950 (age 76); St. Louis, Missouri, U.S.
- Listed height: 6 ft 2 in (1.88 m)
- Listed weight: 195 lb (88 kg)

Career information
- High school: Central (Kansas City, Missouri)
- College: Truman State
- NFL draft: 1973: 4th round, 94th overall pick

Career history
- Atlanta Falcons (1973–1974); Los Angeles Rams (1976)

Career NFL statistics
- Receptions: 17
- Receiving yards: 323
- Receiving TDs: 2
- Stats at Pro Football Reference

Tom Geredine (born June 17, 1950) is an American former professional football player who was a wide receiver in the National Football League (NFL). He played college football for the Northeast Missouri State University Bulldogs. He played in the NFL for the Atlanta Falcons from 1973 to 1974 and Los Angeles Rams in 1976.

Geredine was also an All-American long jumper for the Truman Bulldogs track and field team.
