= Ken Bordelon =

American football player (born 1954)

No. 50
- Position: Linebacker

Personal information
- Born: August 26, 1954 (age 72); New Orleans, Louisiana, U.S.
- Listed height: 6 ft 4 in (1.93 m)
- Listed weight: 228 lb (103 kg)

Career information
- High school: Brother Martin (New Orleans)
- College: LSU
- NFL draft: 1976: 5th round, 150 (by the Los Angeles Rams)th overall pick

Career history
- New Orleans Saints (1976–1982)

Awards and highlights
- First-team All-SEC (1975)

Career NFL statistics
- Sacks: 2
- Interceptions: 3
- Fumble recoveries: 2
- Stats at Pro Football Reference

Kenneth Patrick Bordelon (born August 26, 1954) is an American former professional football player who was a linebacker for six seasons with the New Orleans Saints of the National Football League (NFL). Bordelon played college football for the LSU Tigers and was selected in fifth round of the 1976 NFL draft by the Los Angeles Rams.
