= Nick Bebout =

American football player (born 1951)

No. 63
- Position: Offensive tackle

Personal information
- Born: May 5, 1951 (age 75); Riverton, Wyoming, U.S.
- Listed height: 6 ft 5 in (1.96 m)
- Listed weight: 261 lb (118 kg)

Career information
- College: Wyoming
- NFL draft: 1973: 6th round, 142nd overall pick

Career history
- Atlanta Falcons (1973–1975); Seattle Seahawks (1976–1979); Minnesota Vikings (1980)

Career NFL statistics
- Games played: 97
- Games started: 62
- Fumble recoveries: 5
- Stats at Pro Football Reference

Nick Bebout (born May 5, 1951) is an American former professional football player who was an offensive tackle for eight seasons in the National Football League (NFL) from 1973 to 1980. Bebout played high school football for Shoshoni, Wyoming, and later played college football for the Wyoming Cowboys. In his NFL career, he began with the Atlanta Falcons, moved to the Seattle Seahawks in 1976, and ended with the Minnesota Vikings in 1980.
