= 1977 Pro Bowl =

National Football League all-star game

1977 NFL Pro Bowl
NFC	AFC
14	24
Head coach: Chuck Knox (Los Angeles Rams)	Head coach: Chuck Noll (Pittsburgh Steelers)
	1	2	3	4	Total
NFC	0	14	0	0	14
AFC	10	7	0	7	24
- Date: January 17, 1977
- Stadium: Kingdome; Seattle, Washington
- MVP: Mel Blount (Pittsburgh Steelers)
- Referee: Chuck Heberling
- Attendance: 63,214

TV in the United States
- Network: ABC
- Announcers: Frank Gifford, Howard Cosell & Alex Karras

The 1977 Pro Bowl was the NFL's 27th annual all-star game which featured the outstanding performers from the 1976 season. The game was played on Monday, January 17, 1977, at the Kingdome in Seattle, Washington in front of a crowd of 63,214. The final score was AFC 24, NFC 14.

Chuck Noll of the Pittsburgh Steelers led the AFC team against an NFC team coached by Los Angeles Rams head coach Chuck Knox. The referee was Chuck Heberling.

Mel Blount of the Pittsburgh Steelers was named the game's Most Valuable Player. Players on the winning AFC team received $2,000 apiece while the NFC participants each took home $1,500.

== Rosters ==
=== Offense ===
Position	AFC	NFC
Quarterback	Bert Jones – Baltimore; Ken Anderson – Cincinnati; Ken Stabler – Oakland	Fran Tarkenton – Minnesota; Jim Hart – St. Louis; Roger Staubach – Dallas
Running back	O. J. Simpson – Buffalo; Franco Harris – Pittsburgh; Lydell Mitchell – Baltimore; Greg Pruitt – Cleveland Browns; Otis Armstrong – Denver Broncos	Chuck Foreman – Minnesota; Delvin Williams – San Francisco; Lawrence McCutcheon – Los Angeles; Mike Thomas – Washington; Walter Payton – Chicago
Wide receiver	Roger Carr – Baltimore; Isaac Curtis – Cincinnati; Cliff Branch – Oakland; Charlie Joiner – San Diego	Mel Gray – St. Louis; Drew Pearson –Dallas; Ron Jessie – Los Angeles; Sammy White – Minnesota
Tight end	Dave Casper – Oakland; Russ Francis – New England Patriots	Billy Joe Dupree – Dallas; Charlie Sanders – Detroit
Tackle	Art Shell – Oakland; George Kunz – Baltimore; Leon Gray – New England	Ron Yary – Minnesota; Dan Dierdorf – St. Louis; Rayfield Wright – Dallas
Guard	John Hannah – New England; Gene Upshaw – Oakland; Joe DeLamielleure – Buffalo	Ed White – Minnesota; Conrad Dobler – St. Louis; Blaine Nye – Dallas
Center	Jim Langer – Miami; Jack Rudnay – Kansas City	Tom Banks – St. Louis; Rich Saul – Los Angeles

=== Defense ===
Position	AFC	NFC
Defensive end	John Dutton – Baltimore; L. C. Greenwood – Pittsburgh; Coy Bacon – Cincinnati	Jack Youngblood – Los Angeles; Harvey Martin – Dallas; Tommy Hart – San Francisco
Defensive tackle	Jerry Sherk – Cleveland; Joe Greene – Pittsburgh; Curley Culp – Houston	Alan Page – Minnesota; Larry Brooks – Los Angeles; Cleveland Elam Sr. – San Francisco
Middle linebacker	Jack Lambert – Pittsburgh; Jim LeClair – Cincinnati	Jeff Siemon – Minnesota; Bill Bergey – Philadelphia
Outside linebacker	Robert Brazile – Houston; Jack Ham – Pittsburgh; Phil Villapiano – Oakland	Chris Hanburger – Washington; Isiah Robertson – Los Angeles; Brad Van Pelt – New York; Dave Washington – San Francisco
Cornerback	Mel Blount – Pittsburgh; Lemar Parrish – Cincinnati; Emmitt Thomas – Kansas City; Mike Haynes – New England	Roger Wehrli – St. Louis; Lem Barney – Detroit; Monte Jackson – Los Angeles
Safety	Mike Wagner – Pittsburgh; Tommy Casanova – Cincinnati; Glen Edwards – Pittsburgh	Cliff Harris – Dallas; Ken Houston – Washington; Charlie Waters – Dallas

=== Special teams ===
Position	AFC	NFC
Kicker	Toni Linhart – Baltimore	Jim Bakken – St. Louis
Punter	Ray Guy – Oakland	John James – Atlanta
Return specialist	Rick Upchurch – Denver	Eddie Brown – Washington
