= Don Testerman =

American football player (1952–2018)

No. 42, 34
- Position: Running back

Personal information
- Born: November 7, 1952; Danville, Virginia, U.S.
- Died: May 8, 2018 (aged 65); Greer, South Carolina, U.S.
- Listed height: 6 ft 2 in (1.88 m)
- Listed weight: 230 lb (104 kg)

Career information
- High school: Halifax County (South Boston, Virginia)
- College: Ferrum, Virginia Tech, Lenoir-Rhyne, Clemson
- NFL draft: 1976: 10th round, 282nd overall pick

Career history
- Seattle Seahawks (1976–1978); Miami Dolphins (1980)

Career NFL statistics
- Rushing attempts: 230
- Rushing yards: 865
- Rushing TDs: 2
- Stats at Pro Football Reference

Donald Ray Testerman (November 7, 1952 – May 8, 2018) was an American professional football player who played in the National Football League (NFL) from 1976 to 1980 for the Seattle Seahawks and the Miami Dolphins.

== Professional career ==
Prior to the NFL, Testerman was on Clemson's football team.

Testerman was selected 282nd overall by the Miami Dolphins in the tenth round of the 1976 NFL draft. In August 1976, the Dolphins traded Testerman to the Philadelphia Eagles for a future draft pick. He was then traded to the Seahawks in early September. Testerman made his NFL starter debut against the Dallas Cowboys on October 3, 1976.

Testerman sat out the 1979 season due to an injury. He joined the Miami Dolphins for the 1980 season.

After retiring from the NFL, Testerman was involved in various coaching and non-profit capacities. He periodically substituted for Albemarle High School in Charlottesville, Virginia.

In 2018, Testerman died from the effects of dementia at the age of 65.
