= Ralph Nelson (American football) =

American football player (born 1954)

No. 36, 44
- Position: Running back

Personal information
- Born: January 23, 1954 (age 72); Los Angeles, California, U.S.

Career information
- College: none

Career history
- 1975: Washington Redskins
- 1976: Seattle Seahawks
- Stats at Pro Football Reference

Ralph Lorenzo Nelson (born January 23, 1954) is an American former professional football player who was a running back in the National Football League (NFL). He played for the Washington Redskins in 1975 and Seattle Seahawks in 1976. He did not attend college.
