= Rolland Lawrence =

American football player (born 1951)

No. 22
- Position: Cornerback

Personal information
- Born: March 24, 1951 (age 75); Franklin, Pennsylvania, U.S.
- Listed height: 5 ft 10 in (1.78 m)
- Listed weight: 179 lb (81 kg)

Career information
- High school: Franklin (PA)
- College: Tabor (1969–1972)
- NFL draft: 1973: undrafted

Career history
- Atlanta Falcons (1973–1980)

Awards and highlights
- First-team All-Pro (1977); Pro Bowl (1977)

Career NFL statistics
- Interceptions: 39
- Fumble recoveries: 13
- Defensive TDs: 1
- Stats at Pro Football Reference

Rolland Derenfro "Bay" Lawrence (born March 24, 1951) is an American former professional football player who spent his entire career as a cornerback for the Atlanta Falcons of the National Football League (NFL) from 1973 to 1980. He was a leader of the 1977 Grits Blitz defense, widely considered to be among the best in league history, and his 39 career interceptions are the most by a Falcons player.

== Biography ==
Lawrence was selected to his one and only Pro Bowl in 1977, when he accounted for 10 turnovers on seven interceptions and three fumble recoveries. According to Pro-Football-Reference.com's "Approximate Value" statistic, Lawrence recorded the most valuable season by a non-Hall of Famer in NFL history, recording an AV of 24 in 1977, tied for the fifth-highest single-season AV in NFL history as of 2023. That year marked Lawrence's only-ever selections to the Pro Bowl and an All-Pro team.

Lawrence played college football for the Tabor Bluejays in Hillsboro, Kansas. He became a charter member of the Tabor College Hall of Fame in 1999 and was the first player to have his jersey number (3) retired by the school four years later.
