= Elex Price =

American football player (born 1950)

No. 75
- Position: Defensive tackle

Personal information
- Born: August 11, 1950 (age 76); Yazoo City, Mississippi, U.S.
- Listed height: 6 ft 2 in (1.88 m)
- Listed weight: 208 lb (94 kg)

Career information
- High school: N.D. Taylor (Yazoo City, Mississippi)
- College: Alcorn State (1969–1972)
- NFL draft: 1973: undrafted

Career history
- New Orleans Saints (1973–1980)

Awards and highlights
- SWAC Defensive Player of the Year (1972); First-team Little All-American (1972); 2× First-team NAIA All-American (1971, 1972); First-team All-SWAC (1972); Second-team All-SWAC (1971)

Career NFL statistics
- Games played: 103
- Stats at Pro Football Reference

Elex Drummond Price (born August 11, 1950) is an American former defensive tackle. He played eight seasons in the National Football League for the New Orleans Saints from 1973 to 1980. He played college football at Alcorn State University, where he earned first-team Little All-American honors as a senior.

== Early life ==
Price was born on August 11, 1950, in Yazoo City, Mississippi, as one of 12 children raised by a sharecropper. Although he lived in Yazoo County, he attended high school in the town of Louise in adjacent Humphreys County because he was on the bus route. Price was discovered by Pete Boston, then-head coach of N.D. Taylor High School in Yazoo City, who was refereeing one of his games in Louise. Boston, whose brother was Ralph Boston, convinced Price to come play for him at N.D. Taylor.

Price played fullback, tight end, offensive tackle, and defensive tackle at N.D. Taylor under Boston, earning two letters. His coach later said that Price was "just a big ole country boy who caught on [to football] real quick." He graduated from N.D. Taylor in 1969. Price received offers to play college football from Alcorn State, Lincoln, Marshall, Mississippi Valley State, and Prairie View A&M.

== College career ==
Price attended Alcorn State University, where he majored in physical education while earning four letters for the Braves football team. As a junior, Price was named a first-team NAIA All-American. As a senior, he was named the SWAC Defensive Player of the Year. He also earned first-team Little All-American and first-team NAIA All-American honors.

== Professional career ==
After going unselected in the 1973 NFL draft, Price signed a free agent contract with the New Orleans Saints. His speed and quickness were praised by head coach J. D. Roberts in training camp and he made the final roster. Price was named to the starting lineup following an injury to the team's first pick in the draft, Derland Moore. In the season opener, a 62–7 loss to the Atlanta Falcons, he recorded eight solo tackles, four assists, and one sack. He also recovered a fumble, which led to the only Saints score of the game. "I was so embarrassed I cried. I really was hurt we lost by that great a margin," Price later reflected. He went on to start all 14 games as a rookie, recording 95 tackles, two deflections, and one fumble recovery while making the league-minimum of $14,000.

In 1975, Price played in all 14 games, though he started just two, as the Saints went 2–12. In 1976, Price started 13 games and recorded a team-high 8.5 sacks. In a 51–27 win over the Seattle Seahawks, he forced a fumble on Don Testerman on the first play of the game before intercepting a screen pass and returning it 23 yards for a touchdown in the third quarter. It was his first touchdown as a pro.

In 1978, Price led all National Football Conference (NFC) interior linemen with 104 total tackles (82 unassisted), as well as seven sacks and four forced fumbles as the team won a franchise-record seven games.

On August 3, 1979, Price signed a four-year contract extension with the Saints, just hours ahead of the team's first preseason game. However, he expressed that he "wasn't happy at all" with the outcome and that the Saints "just caught [him] in a vulnerable spot" during negotiations since he was entering his option year. On September 20, Price was placed on the injured reserve list due to a damaged shoulder, making room for the Saints to sign Rick Partridge. He was activated on November 24 ahead of their game against the Atlanta Falcons.

In 1980, Price played in 14 games, starting just one. He scored the only touchdown in their 40–7 defeat to the St. Louis Cardinals, blocking a punt and returning it 19 yards for the score. Price was released on June 9, 1981.

== Personal life ==
I figured if I was going to be out on the town, I might as well spend money in my own place.

— Price, explaining his decision to buy a disco club in Yazoo City.

Price was named after his great-grandfather. Early in his NFL career, he worked as a car salesman in his hometown of Yazoo City, Mississippi. He also owned a nightclub in Yazoo from 1976 to "about 1980." After his playing career, he started a contracting business in Jackson, "painting and putting up sheet rock."

Price married his wife Robbie and the couple had one son named Elex, Jr.
