= Rod Phillips (American football) =

American football player (born 1952)

No. 39, 36
- Position: Running back

Personal information
- Born: December 23, 1952 (age 73); Meridian, Mississippi
- Listed height: 6 ft 0 in (1.83 m)
- Listed weight: 221 lb (100 kg)

Career information
- High school: Harper (MS)
- College: Cincinnati; Jackson State
- NFL draft: 1975: undrafted

Career history
- Los Angeles Rams (1975–1978); St. Louis Cardinals (1979–1980)
- Stats at Pro Football Reference

Rodney Augustus Phillips (born December 23, 1952) also known as Rod Phillips is a retired professional American football player who played running back for four seasons for the Los Angeles Rams and St. Louis Cardinals.
