= Monte Jackson =

American football player (born 1953)

No. 28, 42, 35
- Position: Cornerback

Personal information
- Born: July 14, 1953 (age 73); Sherman, Texas, U.S.
- Listed height: 5 ft 11 in (1.80 m)
- Listed weight: 193 lb (88 kg)

Career information
- High school: St. Augustine (San Diego, California)
- College: San Diego State
- NFL draft: 1975: 2nd round, 28th overall pick

Career history
- Los Angeles Rams (1975–1977); Oakland / Los Angeles Raiders (1978–1982); Los Angeles Rams (1983)

Awards and highlights
- 2× First-team All-Pro (1976, 1977); 2× Pro Bowl (1976, 1977); Super Bowl champion (XV); NFL Interceptions Leader (1976); NFL All-Rookie team (1975)

Career NFL statistics
- Games played: 112
- Interceptions: 23
- Interception yards: 289
- Touchdowns: 3
- Stats at Pro Football Reference

Monte Carl Jackson (born July 14, 1953) is an American former professional football player who was a defensive back in the National Football League (NFL) from 1975 to 1983. He played college football for the San Diego State Aztecs. Jackson attended St. Augustine High School in San Diego. He was drafted 28th overall in the first round of the 1975 NFL Draft by the Los Angeles Rams.

== Personal life ==
Jackson is the older brother of former cornerback, Terry Jackson.
