= Willie McGee (American football) =

American football player (born 1950)

Profile
- Position: Wide receiver

Personal information
- Born: May 14, 1950 (age 76); New Orleans, Louisiana, U.S.
- Died: Chicago, Illinois, U.S.

Career information
- College: Alcorn State University
- NFL draft: 1973: undrafted

Career history
- 1973: San Diego Chargers
- 1974–1975: Los Angeles Rams
- 1976–1977: San Francisco 49ers
- 1978: Detroit Lions
- Stats at Pro Football Reference

Willie McGee (born May 14, 1950) is an American former professional football player who played wide receiver for the San Diego Chargers, Los Angeles Rams, San Francisco 49ers, and Detroit Lions.
