= 1976 NFL season =

American football season

Regular season
- Duration: September 12 – December 12, 1976

Playoffs
- Start date: December 18, 1976
- AFC Champions: Oakland Raiders
- NFC Champions: Minnesota Vikings

Super Bowl XI
- Date: January 9, 1977
- Site: Rose Bowl, Pasadena, California
- Champions: Oakland Raiders

Pro Bowl
- Date: January 17, 1977
- Site: Kingdome, Seattle

AFC teams: West, Central, East
NFC teams: West, Central, East

The 1976 NFL season was the 57th regular season of the National Football League. The league expanded to 28 teams with the addition of the Seattle Seahawks and Tampa Bay Buccaneers. This fulfilled one of the conditions agreed to in 1966 for the 1970 AFL–NFL merger, which called for the league to expand to 28 teams by 1970 or soon thereafter.

For this season only, the Seahawks played in the NFC West while the Buccaneers played in the AFC West. The Seahawks would return to the NFC West with the realignment prior to the 2002 season, on the other hand, the Buccaneers would move to the newly created NFC South in that same year. The Buccaneers became the first NFL team to finish a season 0–14, and, as they also lost their first 12 games in 1977, lost their first 26 games.

The season ended with Super Bowl XI when the Oakland Raiders defeated the Minnesota Vikings 32–14 at the Rose Bowl. The Raiders were the first original AFL team to win a Super Bowl in the post-merger era.

== Player movement ==
=== Expansion draft ===
The 1976 NFL expansion draft was held from March 30 to 31, 1976, with the Seattle Seahawks and the Tampa Bay Buccaneers each selecting 39 players from the other 26 NFL teams.

=== Draft ===
The 1976 NFL draft was held from April 8 to 9, 1976, at New York City's Roosevelt Hotel. With the first pick, the Tampa Bay Buccaneers selected defensive end Lee Roy Selmon from the University of Oklahoma.

== New officials ==
Due to expansion, the NFL needed a new crew to help handle the weekly workload of 14 games. The most notable new official was Jerry Markbreit, hired as a line judge on the crew of referee Tommy Bell. Bell retired after working the 1976 AFC championship game, and Markbreit was promoted to referee for 1977, where he later became the first (and as of 2025, only) man to serve as the referee for four Super Bowls (XVII, XXI, XXVI and XXIX).

Another distinguished new official was Bob McElwee, who was promoted to referee in 1980. McElwee was the referee in Super Bowl XXII, Super Bowl XXVIII and Super Bowl XXXIV.

Norm Schachter retired after officiating Super Bowl X, his third after previously serving as crew chief for Super Bowl I and Super Bowl V. Red Cashion and Don Wedge were promoted after each had worked four seasons in the league.

== Major rule changes ==
- A play clock is placed at each end of the stadium, visible to both players and fans to note the official time between the ready-for-play signal and the snap of the ball.
- If the defensive team commits a foul during a failed extra point attempt, the try is replayed and the offensive team has the option to either have the distance penalty assessed on the next try or the ensuing kickoff.
- If the defensive team commits a foul during a successful extra point attempt, the penalty will be assessed on the ensuing kickoff.
- Players cannot grasp the facemask of an opponent. The penalty for an incidental grasp of the facemask is 5 yards (Note: This penalty was repealed in 2008). The penalty for twisting, turning, or pulling the facemask is 15 yards. A player risks immediate disqualification if the foul is judged to be vicious and/or flagrant.
- A defender is prohibited from running or diving into, or throwing his body against or on a ballcarrier who falls or slips to the ground untouched and makes no attempt to advance, before or after the ball is dead. This is sometimes called as the "Ben Davidson Rule" after the Raiders defender who almost seriously injured quarterback Len Dawson after the Chiefs passer fell to the ground and made no attempt to advance during a 1970 game.
- The official coin toss was moved to three minutes before kickoff. From 1947 through 1975, the official coin toss was held thirty minutes prior to kickoff, and a simulated coin toss was held at midfield three minutes prior to kickoff to inform the fans and media of the outcome of the toss.

== Division races ==
The two expansion clubs, Tampa Bay and Seattle, were "swing" teams that did not participate in regular conference play. Every other NFL team played a home-and-away series against the other members in its division, two or three interconference games, and the remainder of their 14-game schedule against other conference teams. As a member of the AFC in 1976, Tampa Bay played the other 13 members of the conference, while Seattle did the same in the NFC. The 14th game, played in Week Six, was Seattle's 13–10 win at Tampa.

Starting in 1970, and until 2002, there were three divisions (East, Central and West) in each conference. The winners of each division, and a fourth "wild card" team based on the best non-division winner, qualified for the playoffs. The tiebreaker rules were changed to start with head-to-head competition, followed by division records, records versus common opponents, and records in conference play.

=== National Football Conference ===
Week	East		Central		West		Wild Card	
1	3 teams	1–0–0	Chicago, Minnesota	1–0–0	Los Angeles, San Francisco	1–0–0	4 teams	1–0–0
2	3 teams	2–0–0	Chicago	2–0–0	Los Angeles	1–0–1	2 teams	2–0–0
3	Dallas, Washington	3–0–0	Minnesota	2–0–1	Los Angeles	2–0–1	Dallas, Washington	3–0–0
4	Dallas	4–0–0	Minnesota	3–0–1	Los Angeles	3–0–1	St. Louis (Note: Plus other teams with same W–L record)	3–1–0
5	Dallas	5–0–0	Minnesota	4–0–1	San Francisco	4–1–0	St. Louis	4–1–0
6	St. Louis	5–1–0	Minnesota	5–0–1	San Francisco	5–1–0	Dallas	5–1–0
7	Dallas	6–1–0	Minnesota	6–0–1	San Francisco	6–1–0	Los Angeles	5–1–1
8	Dallas	7–1–0	Minnesota	6–1–1	Los Angeles	6–1–1	St. Louis	6–2–0
9	Dallas	8–1–0	Minnesota	7–1–1	Los Angeles	6–2–1	St. Louis	7–2–0
10	Dallas	9–1–0	Minnesota	8–1–1	Los Angeles	6–3–1	St. Louis	8–2–0
11	Dallas	9–2–0	Minnesota	9–1–1	Los Angeles	7–3–1	St. Louis	8–3–0
12	Dallas	10–2–0	Minnesota	9–2–1	Los Angeles	8–3–1	Washington	8–4–0
13	Dallas	11–2–0	Minnesota	10–2–1	Los Angeles	9–3–1	Washington	9–4–0
14	Dallas	11–3–0	Minnesota	11–2–1	Los Angeles	10–3–1	Washington	10–4–0

=== American Football Conference ===
Week	East		Central		West		Wild Card	
1	Baltimore, Miami	1–0–0	3 teams	1–0–0	Oakland, San Diego	1–0–0	4 teams	1–0–0
2	Baltimore	2–0–0	Houston	2–0–0	Denver, Oakland	2–0–0	2 teams	2–0–0
3	Miami	2–1–0	Houston	2–1–0	Oakland, San Diego	3–0–0	5 teams	2–1–0
4	Baltimore	3–1–0	Cincinnati	3–1–0	Denver, Oakland	3–1–0	3 teams*	3–1–0
5	Baltimore	4–1–0	Cincinnati	4–1–0	Oakland	4–1–0	Houston	4–1–0
6	Baltimore	5–1–0	Cincinnati	4–2–0	Oakland	5–1–0	New England	4–2–0
7	Baltimore	6–1–0	Cincinnati	5–2–0	Oakland	6–1–0	New England	5–2–0
8	Baltimore	7–1–0	Cincinnati	6–2–0	Oakland	7–1–0	New England	5–3–0
9	Baltimore	8–1–0	Cincinnati	7–2–0	Oakland	8–1–0	New England	6–3–0
10	Baltimore	8–2–0	Cincinnati	8–2–0	Oakland	9–1–0	New England	7–3–0
11	Baltimore	9–2–0	Cincinnati	9–2–0	Oakland	10–1–0	New England	8–3–0
12	Baltimore	10–2–0	Cincinnati	9–3–0	Oakland	11–1–0	New England	9–3–0
13	Baltimore	10–3–0	Cincinnati	9–4–0	Oakland	12–1–0	New England	10–3–0
14	Baltimore	11–3–0	Pittsburgh	10–4–0	Oakland	13–1–0	New England	11–3–0

== Final standings ==
AFC East
	W	L	T	PCT	DIV	CONF	PF	PA	STK
^{(2)} Baltimore Colts	11	3	0	.786	7–1	11–1	417	246	W1
^{(4)} New England Patriots	11	3	0	.786	6–2	10–2	376	236	W6
Miami Dolphins	6	8	0	.429	5–3	6–6	263	264	L1
New York Jets	3	11	0	.214	2–6	3–9	169	383	L4
Buffalo Bills	2	12	0	.143	0–8	2–10	245	363	L10

AFC Central
	W	L	T	PCT	DIV	CONF	PF	PA	STK
^{(3)} Pittsburgh Steelers	10	4	0	.714	5–1	9–3	342	138	W9
Cincinnati Bengals	10	4	0	.714	4–2	8–4	335	210	W1
Cleveland Browns	9	5	0	.643	3–3	7–5	267	287	L1
Houston Oilers	5	9	0	.357	0–6	3–9	222	273	L2

AFC West
	W	L	T	PCT	DIV	CONF	PF	PA	STK
^{(1)} Oakland Raiders	13	1	0	.929	7–0	10–1	350	237	W10
Denver Broncos	9	5	0	.643	5–2	7–5	315	206	W2
San Diego Chargers	6	8	0	.429	2–5	4–8	248	285	L1
Kansas City Chiefs	5	9	0	.357	2–5	4–8	290	376	W1
Tampa Bay Buccaneers	0	14	0	.000	0–4	0–13	125	412	L14

NFC East
	W	L	T	PCT	DIV	CONF	PF	PA	STK
^{(2)} Dallas Cowboys	11	3	0	.786	6–2	9–3	296	194	L1
^{(4)} Washington Redskins	10	4	0	.714	6–2	9–3	291	217	W4
St. Louis Cardinals	10	4	0	.714	5–3	9–3	309	267	W2
Philadelphia Eagles	4	10	0	.286	2–6	4–8	165	286	W1
New York Giants	3	11	0	.214	1–7	3–9	170	250	L1

NFC Central
	W	L	T	PCT	DIV	CONF	PF	PA	STK
^{(1)} Minnesota Vikings	11	2	1	.821	5–1	9–2–1	305	176	W2
Chicago Bears	7	7	0	.500	4–2	7–5	253	216	L1
Detroit Lions	6	8	0	.429	2–4	4–8	262	220	L2
Green Bay Packers	5	9	0	.357	1–5	5–8	218	299	W1

NFC West
	W	L	T	PCT	DIV	CONF	PF	PA	STK
^{(3)} Los Angeles Rams	10	3	1	.750	7–0	9–2–1	351	190	W4
San Francisco 49ers	8	6	0	.571	5–2	7–5	270	190	W1
New Orleans Saints	4	10	0	.286	2–5	3–8	253	346	L3
Atlanta Falcons	4	10	0	.286	2–5	4–8	172	312	L3
Seattle Seahawks	2	12	0	.143	1–3	1–12	229	429	L5

=== Tiebreakers ===
- Baltimore finished ahead of New England in the AFC East based on better division record (7–1 to Patriots' 6–2).
- Pittsburgh finished ahead of Cincinnati in the AFC Central based on head-to-head sweep (2–0).
- Washington finished ahead of St. Louis in the NFC East based on head-to-head sweep (2–0).
- New Orleans finished ahead of Atlanta in the NFC West based on better point-differential in head-to-head competition (27 points).

== Playoffs ==
Dec 19 – Memorial Stadium
3	Pittsburgh	40
Dec 26 – Oakland Coliseum
2	Baltimore	14
AFC
3	Pittsburgh	7
Dec 18 – Oakland Coliseum
1	Oakland	24
AFC Championship
4	New England	21
Jan 9 – Rose Bowl
1	Oakland	24
Divisional round
A1	Oakland	32
Dec 19 – Texas Stadium
N1	Minnesota	14
Super Bowl XI
3	Los Angeles	14
Dec 26 – Metropolitan Stadium
2	Dallas	12
NFC
3	Los Angeles	13
Dec 18 – Metropolitan Stadium
1	Minnesota	24
NFC Championship
4	Washington	20
1	Minnesota	35

== Awards ==
Most Valuable Player	Bert Jones, quarterback, Baltimore Colts
Coach of the Year	Forrest Gregg, Cleveland Browns
Offensive Player of the Year	Bert Jones, quarterback, Baltimore Colts
Defensive Player of the Year	Jack Lambert, linebacker, Pittsburgh Steelers
Offensive Rookie of the Year	Sammy White, wide receiver, Minnesota Vikings
Defensive Rookie of the Year	Mike Haynes, cornerback, New England Patriots
Man of the Year	Franco Harris, running back, Pittsburgh Steelers
Comeback Player of the Year	Greg Landry, quarterback, Detroit Lions
Super Bowl Most Valuable Player	Fred Biletnikoff, wide receiver, Oakland Raiders

== Coaching changes ==
=== Offseason ===
- Cincinnati Bengals: Paul Brown retired after over 40 years of coaching. Bill Johnson was named as Brown's replacement.
- New Orleans Saints: Hank Stram became the team's new head coach. John North was fired after a 1-5 start to the 1975 season, and Ernie Hefferle then served as interim.
- New York Jets: Lou Holtz was named as head coach of the Jets. Charley Winner was fired nine games into the 1975 season after only posting two wins. Offensive coordinator Ken Shipp served as interim for the last five games.
- Philadelphia Eagles: Mike McCormack was replaced by Dick Vermeil.
- San Francisco 49ers: Monte Clark replaced Dick Nolan.
- Seattle Seahawks: Jack Patera became the expansion team's first head coach.
- Tampa Bay Buccaneers: John McKay became the expansion team's first head coach.

=== In-season ===
- Atlanta Falcons: Marion Campbell was fired after a 1–4 start to the season. General manager Pat Peppler served as interim for the rest of the season.
- Buffalo Bills: Lou Saban resigned after the fifth game of the season. Offensive line coach Jim Ringo took over as interim.
- Detroit Lions: Rick Forzano left after the team lost three of its first four games. Coordinator of personnel and scouting Tommy Hudspeth took over for the last 10 games.
- New York Giants: Bill Arnsparger was fired after the team lost its first seven games. Assistant coach John McVay was promoted to head coach.
- New York Jets: Lou Holtz resigned prior to the last game of the season, returning to college as coach of the Arkansas Razorbacks. Mike Holovak served as interim for the team's final game, as the team finished at 3–11.

== Stadium changes ==
- The New York Giants finally opened their new Giants Stadium in East Rutherford, New Jersey, after spending two seasons at the Yale Bowl and one season temporarily sharing Shea Stadium with the New York Jets
- The Tampa Bay Buccaneers began play at Tampa Stadium
- The Seattle Seahawks began play at the Kingdome
- After 6 years of using the Poly-Turf artificial turf surface, the Miami Dolphins' stadium, the Orange Bowl reverted to using natural grass; which would be used for the rest of the stadium's existence.

== Uniform changes ==
- The Atlanta Falcons switched from gray facemasks to white.
- The Dallas Cowboys replaced the blue stripe on right side of their helmets with a red stripe to honor the United States' Bicentennial for this season only.
- The New Orleans Saints began wearing black pants with their white jerseys, and facemasks changed from gray to black.
- The New York Giants replaced the striped uppercase "NY" helmet logo worn during the previous season only with an italicized and underlined "GIANTS".
- The inaugural Seattle Seahawks uniforms featured silver helmets and pants; blue jerseys with white numbers, and white and green sleeve stripes; and white jerseys with blue numbers, and blue and green sleeve stripes. The new helmet logo featured an osprey's head based on Kwakwakaʼwakw art masks.
- The inaugural Tampa Bay Buccaneers uniforms featured white helmets and pants, red trim, white jerseys with orange numbers, and orange jerseys with white numbers (which got the nickname "Creamsicle" uniforms). The nicknamed "Bucco Bruce" helmet logo featured a mustached pirate donning a plumed slouch hat and clutching a dagger in his teeth.

== Television ==
This was the third year under the league's four-year broadcast contracts with ABC, CBS, and NBC to televise Monday Night Football, the NFC package, and the AFC package, respectively. Lee Leonard replaced Jack Buck, joining Bryant Gumbel on NBC's pregame show GrandStand. Al DeRogatis also left the network, leaving Curt Gowdy and Don Meredith as NBC's lead broadcast team in a two-man booth. "Jimmy the Greek" Snyder joined The NFL Today to predict the results of NFL games.
