= 1976 Detroit Lions season =

NFL team season

- Owner: William Clay Ford Sr.
- General manager: Russ Thomas
- Head coach: Rick Forzano and Tommy Hudspeth
- Home stadium: Pontiac Metropolitan Stadium

Results
- Record: 6–8
- Division place: 3rd NFC Central
- Playoffs: Did not qualify
- All-Pros: None
- Pro Bowlers: 2: TE Charlie Sanders; CB Lem Barney

The 1976 Detroit Lions season was the 47th season in franchise history. After the first four games of the season, Rick Forzano resigned under pressure of owner William Clay Ford, and was replaced by one time Brigham Young University head coach and Lions assistant Tommy Hudspeth. In spite of a stellar season by quarterback Greg Landry, that year's NFL Comeback Player Of The Year, the team was still mired in mediocrity, finishing 6–8.

== Offseason ==
=== 1976 expansion draft ===
Detroit Lions selected during the expansion draft
Round	Overall	Name	Position	Expansion team
0	0	Larry Ball	Linebacker	Tampa Bay Buccaneers
0	0	Gordon Jolley	Offensive tackle	Seattle Seahawks
0	0	John McMakin	Tight end	Seattle Seahawks

=== NFL draft ===
1976 Detroit Lions draft
Round	Pick	Player	Position	College	Notes
1	10	James Hunter	CB	Grambling State	from Chicago
1	16	Lawrence Gaines	RB	Wyoming	
2	44	Ken Long	G	Purdue	
2	46	David Hill *	TE	Texas A&I	from San Diego
3	68	Russ Bolinger	OT	Long Beach State	from Chicago
3	76	John Woodcock	DT	Hawaii	
5	145	Steadman Scavella	LB	Miami (FL)	from Miami
7	198	Garth TenNapel	LB	Texas A&M	
8	217	Rich Sorenson	K	Chico State	from New England
8	225	Charles Braswell	DB	West Virginia	
9	253	Leanell Jones	TE	Long Beach State	
10	279	Bill Bowerman	DB	New Mexico State	
11	307	Gary Shugrue	DE	Villanova	
12	335	Mike McCabe	C	South Carolina	
13	363	Mel Jacobs	WR	San Diego State	
14	391	Leonard Elston	WR	Kentucky State	
15	419	Trent Smock	WR	Indiana	
16	447	Craig McCurdy	LB	William & Mary	
17	475	Jim Meeks	DB	Boise State	
Made roster * Made at least one Pro Bowl during career

Notes

- Detroit were awarded a first-round pick (8th) from Los Angeles as compensation for the Rams signing Lions free agent WR Ron Jessie. During the draft, Detroit traded this 8th pick to Chicago in exchange for the Bears' first- and third-round picks (10th and 68th).
- Detroit were awarded a second-round pick (46th) from San Diego as compensation for the Chargers signing Lions free agent C Ed Flanagan.
- Detroit traded its fourth-round pick (108th) to Miami in exchange for LB Larry Ball and the Dolphins' fifth-round pick (145th).
- Detroit traded its fifth-round pick (140th) to San Francisco in exchange for QB Joe Reed.
- Detroit traded its sixth-round pick (170th) to New England in exchange for C Jon Morris.
- Detroit traded FB Leon Crosswhite to New England in exchange for the Patriots' eighth-round pick (217th) and sixth-round pick in 1975.

== Personnel ==
=== Staff / Coaches ===
1976 Detroit Lions staff
Front office: Owner / Team President - William Clay Ford, Sr.; Senior / Executive Vice President - Edwin J. Anderson; Vice President / General manager - Russ Thomas; Assistant General Manager - Rogers Lebew; Coordinator of Personnel / Scouting - Tommy Hudspeth; Treasurer - Newton S. Peters; Publicity Director / Business Manager - Lyall Smith; Assistant Publicity Director - Elliott Trumbull; Equipment manager - Roy Marklem; Assistant equipment manager - Dan Jaroschewich; Head coaches: Head coach – Rick Forzano; Assistant Head Coach - Bruce Beatty; Assistant to Coaching Staff - Bill Belichick; Offensive coaches: Offensive Coordinator / Quarterbacks & Receivers - Ken Shipp; Assistant Receivers Coach - Art Zeleznik; Offensive Backs - Bob Gibson; Offensive Line - Bruce Beatty; Interior Offensive Line / Running Game Coordinator - Joe Bugel	Defensive coaches: Defensive Backfield / Secondary - Jim Carr; Defensive Line Coach - Fritz Shurmur; Linebackers Coach - Jerry Glanville; Special teams coaches: Special Teams Coordinator - Jerry Glanville; Assistant Special Teams - Art Zeleznik; Strength and conditioning: Strength and Conditioning - Floyd Reese; Trainer - Kent Falb; Assistant Trainer - Ken Rasche

=== Final roster ===
1976 Detroit Lions roster
Quarterbacks (QB): 16 Gary Danielson; 11 Greg Landry; 14 Joe Reed; Running backs (RB): 43 Andy Bolton; 24 Dexter Bussey; 38 Lawrence Gaines; 33 Bobby Thompson; Wide receivers (WR): 45 Ray Jarvis; 44 Bob Picard; 39 Leonard Thompson; 49 Larry Walton; Tight ends (TE): 81 David Hill; 88 Charlie Sanders	Offensive linemen (OL): 62 Lynn Boden G; 73 Russ Bolinger G; 76 Rocky Freitas T; 71 Craig Hertwig T; 66 Bob Kowalkowski G; 65 Ken Long G; 68 Mark Markovich C; 63 Jon Morris C; 75 Jim Yarbrough T; Defensive linemen (DL): 79 Don Croft DT; 70 Billy Howard DE; 83 Jim Mitchell DE/DT; 72 Ernie Price DE; 82 Ken Sanders DE; 77 John Woodcock DT	Linebackers (LB): 52 Jim Laslavic MLB; 50 Paul Naumoff OLB; 55 Ed O'Neil MLB; 57 Garth TenNapel OLB; 59 Charlie Weaver OLB; Defensive backs (DB): 20 Lem Barney CB; 29 Ben Davis CB; 28 James Hunter FS; 23 Levi Johnson CB; 27 Maurice Tyler SS; 40 Charlie West SS; Special teams (ST): 1 Benny Ricardo K; 18 Herman Weaver P	Practice squad: None - N/A; Reserve: 78 Doug English DT (IR); 74 Larry Hand DT (IR); 41 J. D. Hill WR (IR); 26 Dick Jauron S (IR); 25 Horace King RB (IR); 88 Herb Orvis DT (IR); Rookies in italics 41 active, 6 reserve, 0 practice squad

== Regular season ==
On November 25, O.J. Simpson of the Buffalo Bills set a record with the most rushing yards in a Thanksgiving Day game, by rushing for 273 yards against the Lions.

In spite of their poor overall record the Lions offense set a statistical record for Passer Rating Differential (40.9, 14th best 1960 to 2011). Such a high rating is usually reserved for playoff teams or Super Bowl winners.

=== Schedule ===
Week	Date	Opponent	Result	Record	Venue	Attendance
1	September 12	at **Chicago Bears**	**L** 3–10	0–1	Soldier Field	54,125
2	September 19	Atlanta Falcons	**W** 24–10	1–1	Pontiac Metropolitan Stadium	50,840
3	September 26	**Minnesota Vikings**	**L** 9–10	1–2	Pontiac Metropolitan Stadium	77,292
4	October 3	at **Green Bay Packers**	**L** 14–24	1–3	Lambeau Field	55,041
5	October 10	New England Patriots	**W** 30–10	2–3	Pontiac Metropolitan Stadium	60,174
6	October 17	at Washington Redskins	**L** 7–20	2–4	RFK Stadium	45,908
7	October 24	at Seattle Seahawks	**W** 41–14	3–4	Kingdome	61,280
8	October 31	**Green Bay Packers**	**W** 27–6	4–4	Pontiac Metropolitan Stadium	74,992
9	November 7	at **Minnesota Vikings**	**L** 23–31	4–5	Metropolitan Stadium	46,735
10	November 14	at New Orleans Saints	**L** 16–17	4–6	Louisiana Superdome	42,048
11	November 21	**Chicago Bears**	**W** 14–10	5–6	Pontiac Metropolitan Stadium	78,042
12	November 25	Buffalo Bills	**W** 27–14	6–6	Pontiac Metropolitan Stadium	66,875
13	December 5	at New York Giants	**L** 10–24	6–7	Giants Stadium	66,069
14	December 11	Los Angeles Rams	**L** 17–20	6–8	Pontiac Metropolitan Stadium	73,470

!Note: Intra-division opponents are in bold text.

=== Season summary ===
==== Week 1 at Bears ====
Week One: Detroit Lions (0–0) at Chicago Bears (0–0)

Quarter	1	2	3	4	Total
Lions	0	3	0	0	**3**
**Bears**	0	0	7	3	**10**

at Soldier Field, Chicago, Illinois

- Date: September 12, 1976
- Game time: 2:00 p.m.
- Game weather: 69 °F or 20.6 °C • Wind 12 miles per hour (19 km/h; 10 kn)
- Game attendance: 54,125
- Pro-Football-Reference.com

Game information

Second quarter

- DET – Errol Mann 27-yard field goal. Lions 3–0. Drive:

Third quarter

- CHI – Johnny Musso 3-yard run (Bob Thomas kick). Bears 7–3. Drive:

Fourth quarter

- CHI – Bob Thomas 27-yard field goal. Bears 10–3. Drive:

Top passers

- DET – Joe Reed – 11/23, 91 yards
- CHI – Bob Avellini – 7/16, 120 yards

Top rushers

- DET – Horace King – 15 rushes, 57 yards
- CHI – Walter Payton – 25 rushes, 70 yards

Top receivers

- DET – Ray Jarvis – 4 receptions, 85 yards
- CHI – Greg Latta – 2 receptions, 87 yards

==== Week 2 vs Falcons ====
Week Two: Atlanta Falcons (0–1) at Detroit Lions (0–1)

Quarter	1	2	3	4	Total
Falcons	0	7	3	0	**10**
**Lions**	0	0	0	24	**24**

at Pontiac Metropolitan Stadium, Pontiac, Michigan

- Date: September 19, 1976
- Game time: 1:00 p.m.
- Game weather: Indoors (dome)
- Game attendance: 50,840
- Box Score

Game information

Second quarter

- ATL – Bubba Bean 5-yard run (Nick Mike-Mayer kick). Falcons 7–0. Drive:

Third quarter

- ATL – Nick Mike-Mayer 41-yard field goal. Falcons 10–0. Drive:

Fourth quarter

- DET – Greg Landry 5-yard run (Errol Mann kick). Falcons 10–7. Drive:
- DET – Errol Mann 32-yard field goal. Tie 10–10. Drive:
- DET – Ed O'Neil 32-yard pass from Joe Reed (Errol Mann kick). Lions 17–10. Drive:
- DET – James Hunter 39-yard interception return (Errol Mann kick). Lions 24–10.

Top passers

- ATL – Steve Bartkowski – 5/16, 59 yards, 3 INT
- DET – Joe Reed – 5/11, 78 yards, TD

Top rushers

- ATL – Bubba Bean – 22 rushes, 98 yards, TD
- DET – Dexter Bussey – 15 rushes, 79 yards

Top receivers

- ATL – Alfred Jenkins – 3 receptions, 47 yards
- DET – Horace King – 3 receptions, 33 yards

==== Week 4 at Packers ====
Week Four: Detroit Lions (1–2) at Green Bay Packers (0–3)

Quarter	1	2	3	4	Total
Lions	0	14	0	0	**14**
**Packers**	10	0	0	14	**24**

at Lambeau Field, Green Bay, Wisconsin

- Date: October 3
- Game time: 2:00 p.m.
- Game weather: 60 °F or 15.6 °C
- Game attendance: 55,041
- Box Score

Game information

**First quarter**

- GB – Barty Smith 1-yard run (Chester Marcol kick). Packers 7–0. Drive:
- GB – Chester Marcol 35-yard field goal. Packers 10–0. Drive:

**Second quarter**

- DET – Dexter Bussey 7-yard run (Errol Mann kick). Packers 10–7. Drive:
- DET – Ray Jarvis 3-yard pass from Greg Landry (Errol Mann kick). Lions 14–10. Drive:

**Third quarter**

- No scoring

**Fourth quarter**

- GB – Bert Askson 2-yard pass from Lynn Dickey (Chester Marcol kick). Packers 17–14. Drive:
- GB – Steve Odom 40-yard pass from Willard Harrell (Chester Marcol kick). Packers 24–14. Drive:

Top passers

- DET – Greg Landry – 12/17, 122 yards, TD, INT
- GB – Willard Harrell – 1/1, 40 yards, TD

Top rushers

- DET – Dexter Bussey – 22 rushes, 81 yards, TD
- GB – Willard Harrell – 17 rushes, 111 yards

Top receivers

- DET – Charlie Sanders – 3 receptions, 41 yards
- GB – Steve Odom – 2 receptions, 45 yards, TD

=== Standings ===
NFC Central
	W	L	T	PCT	DIV	CONF	PF	PA	STK
^{(1)} Minnesota Vikings	11	2	1	.821	5–1	9–2–1	305	176	W2
Chicago Bears	7	7	0	.500	4–2	7–5	253	216	L1
Detroit Lions	6	8	0	.429	2–4	4–8	262	220	L2
Green Bay Packers	5	9	0	.357	1–5	5–8	218	299	W1
