= 1976 Green Bay Packers season =

NFL team season

- Head coach: Bart Starr
- Home stadium: Lambeau Field; Milwaukee County Stadium

Results
- Record: 5–9
- Division place: 4th NFC Central
- Playoffs: Did not qualify

The 1976 Green Bay Packers season was their 58th season overall and their 56th season in the National Football League. The team finished with a 5–9 record under coach Bart Starr, earning them a fourth-place finish in the NFC Central division. The Packers struggled, including starting three different quarterbacks during the season, and finished in last place in the NFC Central with a 5–9 record. After this season, guard Gale Gillingham, the lone remaining player from the Vince Lombardi-era Packers still with the team, retired.

== Offseason ==
=== 1976 expansion draft ===
Green Bay Packers selected during the expansion draft
Round	Overall	Name	Position	Expansion team
0	0	Ken Hutcherson	Linebacker	Seattle Seahawks
0	0	Al Matthews	Safety	Seattle Seahawks
0	0	Barry Smith	Wide Receiver	Tampa Bay Buccaneers

=== NFL draft ===
1976 Green Bay Packers draft
Round	Pick	Player	Position	College	Notes
1	23	Mark Koncar	Offensive tackle	Colorado	
3	72	Mike McCoy	Cornerback	Colorado	
4	101	Tom Perko	Linebacker	Pittsburgh	
5	132	Aundra Thompson	Running back	East Texas State	
8	218	Jim Burrow	Safety	Nebraska	
9	245	Jim Gueno	Linebacker	Tulane	
10	274	Jessie Green	Wide receiver	Tulsa	
11	301	Curtis Leak	Wide receiver	Johnson C. Smith	
12	328	Melvin Jackson	Guard	USC	
13	355	Bradley Bowman	Defensive back	Southern Miss	
14	386	John Henson	Running back	Cal Poly	
15	413	Jerry Dandridge	Linebacker	Memphis State	
16	440	Mike Timmermans	Guard	Northern Iowa	
17	467	Ray Hall	Tight end	Cal Poly	
Made roster

=== Undrafted free agents ===
1976 undrafted free agents of note
Player	Position	College
Dan Brunner	Tight end	Wisconsin–Whitewater

== Roster ==
Green Bay Packers roster
Quarterbacks: 19 Carlos Brown; 16 Randy Johnson; Running backs: 42 John Brockington; 40 Willard Harrell; 41 Dave Osborn; 32 Ken Starch; 26 Eric Torkelson; Wide receivers: 84 Steve Odom; 85 Ken Payne; 89 Ollie Smith; Tight ends: 88 Bert Askson; 81 Rich McGeorge	Offensive linemen: 67 Dick Enderle G; 68 Gale Gillingham G; 72 Dick Himes T; 55 Bob Hyland C; 71 Melvin Jackson G; 60 Steve Knutson T; 79 Mark Koncar T; 54 Larry McCarren C; 61 Bruce Van Dyke G; Defensive linemen: 70 Bob Barber DE/DT; 76 Mike McCoy DT; 75 Dave Pureifory DT; 87 Alden Roche DE; 74 Dave Roller DT; 83 Clarence Williams DE	Linebackers: 57 Ron Acks MLB; 53 Fred Carr OLB; 51 Jim Gueno OLB; 58 Don Hansen MLB; 56 Tom Perko OLB; 59 Tom Toner OLB; 52 Gary Weaver OLB; Defensive backs: 28 Willie Buchanon CB; 24 Johnnie Gray FS; 44 Charlie Hall SS; 46 Steve Luke SS; 29 Mike McCoy CB; 45 Perry Smith CB; 21 Steve Wagner FS; Special teams: 11 David Beverly P; 13 Chester Marcol K	Reserve lists: 50 Jim Carter LB (IR); 10 Lynn Dickey QB (IR); 86 Jessie Green WR (IR); 12 Don Milan QB (IR); 33 Barty Smith RB (IR); 27 Cliff Taylor RB (IR); 43 Aundra Thompson WR (IR); 82 Gerald Tinker WR (IR); Rookies in italics

== Regular season ==
=== Schedule ===
Week	Date	Opponent	Result	Record	Venue	Attendance
1	September 12	San Francisco 49ers	**L** 14–26	0–1	Lambeau Field	54,628
2	September 19	at St. Louis Cardinals	**L** 0–29	0–2	Busch Memorial Stadium	48,842
3	September 26	at Cincinnati Bengals	**L** 7–28	0–3	Riverfront Stadium	44,103
4	October 3	**Detroit Lions**	**W** 24–14	1–3	Lambeau Field	55,041
5	October 10	Seattle Seahawks	**W** 27–20	2–3	Milwaukee County Stadium	54,983
6	October 17	Philadelphia Eagles	**W** 28–13	3–3	Lambeau Field	55,398
7	October 24	at Oakland Raiders	**L** 14–18	3–4	Oakland–Alameda County Coliseum	52,232
8	October 31	at **Detroit Lions**	**L** 6–27	3–5	Pontiac Silverdome	74,992
9	November 7	New Orleans Saints	**W** 32–27	4–5	Milwaukee County Stadium	52,936
10	November 14	at **Chicago Bears**	**L** 13–24	4–6	Soldier Field	52,907
11	November 21	**Minnesota Vikings**	**L** 10–17	4–7	Milwaukee County Stadium	53,104
12	November 28	**Chicago Bears**	**L** 10–16	4–8	Lambeau Field	56,267
13	December 5	at **Minnesota Vikings**	**L** 9–20	4–9	Metropolitan Stadium	43,700
14	December 12	at Atlanta Falcons	**W** 24–20	5–9	Atlanta–Fulton County Stadium	23,436

Note: Intra-division opponents are in bold text.

=== Standings ===
NFC Central
	W	L	T	PCT	DIV	CONF	PF	PA	STK
Minnesota Vikings^{(1)}	11	2	1	.821	5–1	9–2–1	305	176	W2
Chicago Bears	7	7	0	.500	4–2	7–5	253	216	L1
Detroit Lions	6	8	0	.429	2–4	4–8	262	220	L2
Green Bay Packers	5	9	0	.357	1–5	5–8	218	299	W1

=== Season summary ===
==== Week 4 vs Lions ====
Week Four: Detroit Lions (1–2) at Green Bay Packers (0–3)

Quarter	1	2	3	4	Total
Lions	0	14	0	0	**14**
**Packers**	10	0	0	14	**24**

at Lambeau Field, Green Bay, Wisconsin

- Date: October 3
- Game time: 2:00 p.m.
- Game weather: 60 °F (16 °C)
- Game attendance: 55,041
- Box Score

Game information

**First quarter**

- GB – Barty Smith 1-yard run (Chester Marcol kick). Packers 7–0. Drive:
- GB – Chester Marcol 35-yard field goal. Packers 10–0. Drive:

**Second quarter**

- DET – Dexter Bussey 7-yard run (Errol Mann kick). Packers 10–7. Drive:
- DET – Ray Jarvis 3-yard pass from Greg Landry (Errol Mann kick). Lions 14–10. Drive:

**Third quarter**

- No scoring

**Fourth quarter**

- GB – Bert Askson 2-yard pass from Lynn Dickey (Chester Marcol kick). Packers 17–14. Drive:
- GB – Steve Odom 40-yard pass from Willard Harrell (Chester Marcol kick). Packers 24–14. Drive:

Top passers

- DET – Greg Landry – 12/17, 122 yards, TD, INT
- GB – Willard Harrell – 1/1, 40 yards, TD

Top rushers

- DET – Dexter Bussey – 22 rushes, 81 yards, TD
- GB – Willard Harrell – 17 rushes, 111 yards

Top receivers

- DET – Charlie Sanders – 3 receptions, 41 yards
- GB – Steve Odom – 2 receptions, 45 yards, TD
