= 1976 Minnesota Vikings season =

NFL team season

- Owner: Max Winter
- General manager: Mike Lynn
- Head coach: Bud Grant
- Home stadium: Metropolitan Stadium

Results
- Record: 11–2–1
- Division place: 1st NFC Central
- Playoffs: Won Divisional Playoffs (vs. Redskins) 35–20; Won NFC Championship (vs. Rams) 24–13; Lost Super Bowl XI (vs. Raiders) 14–32
- All-Pros: T Ron Yary (1st team); RB Chuck Foreman (2nd team); DT Alan Page (2nd team)
- Pro Bowlers: CB Bobby Bryant; RB Chuck Foreman; DT Alan Page; LB Jeff Siemon; QB Fran Tarkenton; G Ed White; WR Sammy White; T Ron Yary

Uniform
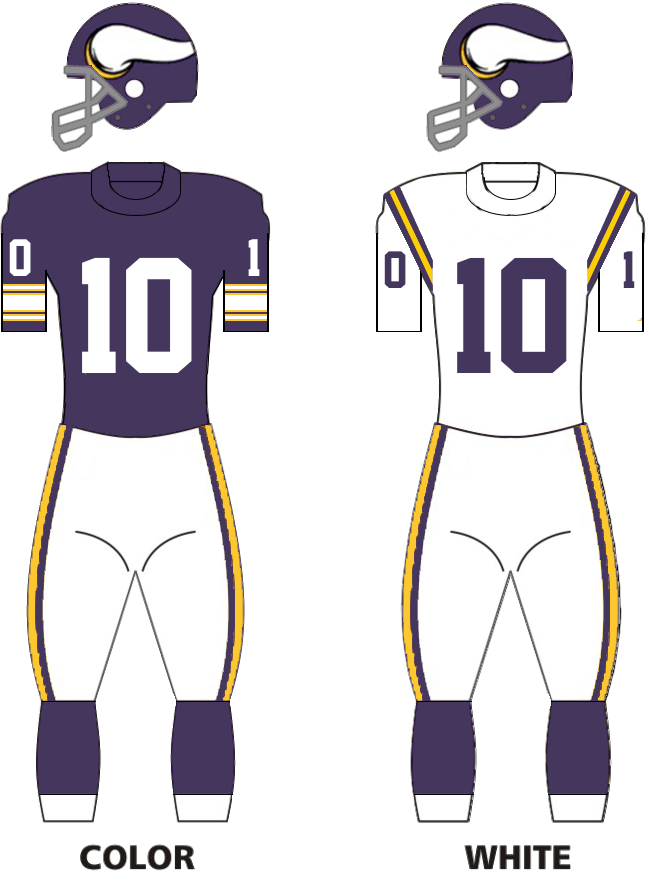

The 1976 season was the Minnesota Vikings' 16th in the National Football League (NFL). The Vikings finished with an 11–2–1 record to give them their eighth NFC Central division title. The Vikings beat the Washington Redskins 35–20 in the divisional round of the playoffs, followed by a 24–13 win over the Los Angeles Rams in the NFC Championship, before losing 32–14 to the Oakland Raiders in Super Bowl XI. As of 2025, this is the most recent Super Bowl appearance by the franchise.

== Offseason ==
=== 1976 draft ===
Pro Bowler

1976 Minnesota Vikings Draft
Draft order		Player name	Position	College	Notes
Round	Selection	Player name	Position	College	Notes
1	25	James White	Defensive tackle	Oklahoma State	
2	54	Sammy White	Wide receiver	Grambling State	
3	85	Wes Hamilton	Guard	Tulsa	
4	118	Leonard Willis	Wide receiver	Ohio State	
5	133	Steve Wagner	Safety	Wisconsin	from Falcons (Note: The Vikings traded RB Oscar Reed to the Atlanta Falcons in exchange for a fifth-round selection (133rd overall).)
5	149	Keith Bernette	Running back	Boston College	
6	180	Terry Egerdahl	Defensive back	Minnesota–Duluth	
7	206	Larry Brune	Defensive back	Rice	
8	235	Traded to the New England Patriots (Note: The Vikings traded an eighth-round selection (235th overall) and a 1977 sixth-round selection (166th overall) to the New England Patriots in exchange for C Doug Dumler.)			
9	262	Isaac Hagins	Wide receiver	Southern	
10	289	Bill Salmon	Quarterback	Northern Iowa	
11	316	Steve Kracher	Running back	Montana State	
12	345	Robert Sparks	Defensive back	San Francisco State	
13	372	Gary Paulson	Defensive end	Colorado State	
14	401	Jeff Stapleton	Offensive tackle	Purdue	
15	428	Ron Groce	Running back	Macalester	
16	457	Randy Hickel	Defensive back	Montana State	
17	484	Dick Lukowski	Defensive tackle	West Virginia	

=== 1976 expansion draft ===
Vikings selected during the expansion draft
Name	Position	Expansion team
Joe Blahak	Cornerback	Tampa Bay Buccaneers
Sam McCullum	Wide receiver	Seattle Seahawks
John Ward	Guard	Tampa Bay Buccaneers

== Personnel ==
=== Staff ===
1976 Minnesota Vikings staff
Front office: Principal owner/president – Max Winter; Chairman/treasurer – H. P. Skoglund; General manager – Mike Lynn; Coordinator–administration – Harley Peterson; Coordinator–football operations – Jerry Reichow; Director of player personnel – Frank Gilliam; Head coaches: Head coach – Bud Grant; Offensive coaches: Offensive coordinator – Jerry Burns; Offensive line – John Michels; Offensive backfield – Bus Mertes	Defensive coaches: Defensive coordinator – Neill Armstrong; Defensive line – Buddy Ryan; Linebackers – Jack Nelson

=== Roster ===
1976 Minnesota Vikings roster
Quarterbacks (QB): 17 Bob Berry; 19 Bob Lee; 10 Fran Tarkenton; Running backs (RB): 44 Chuck Foreman; 47 Ron Groce; 48 Sammy Johnson; 33 Brent McClanahan; 35 Robert Miller; Wide receivers (WR): 26 Bob Grim; 28 Ahmad Rashad; 85 Sammy White; 80 Leonard Willis; Tight ends (TE): 84 Steve Craig; 83 Stu Voigt	Offensive linemen (OL): 74 Bart Buetow T; 57 Doug Dumler C; 68 Charlie Goodrum G; 61 Wes Hamilton G; 78 Steve Riley T; 53 Mick Tingelhoff C; 62 Ed White G; 73 Ron Yary T; Defensive linemen (DL): 81 Carl Eller DE; 70 Jim Marshall DE; 77 Mark Mullaney DE; 88 Alan Page DT; 69 Doug Sutherland DT; 72 James White DT	Linebackers (LB): 59 Matt Blair OLB; 58 Wally Hilgenberg OLB; 55 Amos Martin MLB; 54 Fred McNeill OLB; 50 Jeff Siemon MLB; 60 Roy Winston OLB; Defensive backs (DB): 25 Nate Allen CB; 27 Autry Beamon CB/S; 20 Bobby Bryant CB; 40 Windlan Hall CB/S; 22 Paul Krause FS; 23 Jeff Wright SS; 43 Nate Wright CB; Special teams (ST): 12 Neil Clabo P; 14 Fred Cox K	Reserve: 56 Scott Anderson C/G (IR); 39 Mark Kellar RB (IR); Rookies in italics

== Preseason ==
Week	Date	Opponent	Result	Record	Venue	Attendance
1	July 31	at Miami Dolphins	L 3–16	0–1	Miami Orange Bowl	39,939
2	August 7	at Kansas City Chiefs	W 13–10	1–1	Arrowhead Stadium	32,851
3	August 16	at Cleveland Browns	L 7–31	1–2	Cleveland Stadium	44,336
4	August 22	Cincinnati Bengals	W 23–17	2–2	Metropolitan Stadium	43,784
5	August 28	Philadelphia Eagles	W 20–16	3–2	Metropolitan Stadium	46,512
6	September 5	at Denver Broncos	L 17–30	3–3	Mile High Stadium	52,129

== Regular season ==
=== Schedule ===
Week	Date	Opponent	Result	Record	Venue	Attendance
1	September 12	at New Orleans Saints	W 40–9	1–0	Louisiana Superdome	58,156
2	September 19	Los Angeles Rams	T 10–10 (OT)	1–0–1	Metropolitan Stadium	47,310
3	September 26	at Detroit Lions	W 10–9	2–0–1	Silverdome	77,292
4	October 4	Pittsburgh Steelers	W 17–6	3–0–1	Metropolitan Stadium	47,809
5	October 10	Chicago Bears	W 20–19	4–0–1	Metropolitan Stadium	47,614
6	October 17	New York Giants	W 24–7	5–0–1	Metropolitan Stadium	46,508
7	October 24	at Philadelphia Eagles	W 31–12	6–0–1	Veterans Stadium	56,233
8	October 31	at Chicago Bears	L 13–14	6–1–1	Soldier Field	53,602
9	November 7	Detroit Lions	W 31–23	7–1–1	Metropolitan Stadium	46,735
10	November 14	Seattle Seahawks	W 27–21	8–1–1	Metropolitan Stadium	45,087
11	November 21	at Green Bay Packers	W 17–10	9–1–1	Milwaukee County Stadium	53,104
12	November 29	at San Francisco 49ers	L 16–20	9–2–1	Candlestick Park	56,775
13	December 5	Green Bay Packers	W 20–9	10–2–1	Metropolitan Stadium	43,700
14	December 11	at Miami Dolphins	W 29–7	11–2–1	Miami Orange Bowl	46,543

=== Game summaries ===
==== Week 1: at New Orleans Saints ====
Week 1: Minnesota Vikings at New Orleans Saints – Game summary

Quarter	1	2	3	4	Total
Vikings	13	17	7	3	40
Saints	0	3	6	0	9

at Louisiana Superdome, New Orleans, Louisiana

- Date: September 12, 1976
- Game time: 1:00 p.m. CDT
- Game weather: None (indoor stadium)
- Game attendance: 58,156
- Pro-Football-Reference.com

Game information
First quarter
- MIN – Brent McClanahan 1-yard run (kick failed). Vikings 6–0.
- MIN – Chuck Foreman 2-yard run (Fred Cox kick). Vikings 13–0.

Second quarter

- NO – Rich Szaro 45-yard field goal. Vikings 13–3.
- MIN – Brent McClanahan 5-yard run (Fred Cox kick). Vikings 20–3.
- MIN – Fred Cox 24-yard field goal. Vikings 23–3.
- MIN – Sammy White 47-yard pass from Fran Tarkenton (Fred Cox kick). Vikings 30–3.

Third quarter

- MIN – Chuck Foreman 6-yard run (Fred Cox kick). Vikings 37–3.
- NO – Tony Galbreath 1-yard run (kick failed). Vikings 37–9.

Fourth quarter

- MIN – Fred Cox 35-yard field goal. Vikings 40–9.

==== Week 2: vs. Los Angeles Rams ====
Week 2: Los Angeles Rams at Minnesota Vikings – Game summary

Quarter	1	2	3	4	OT	Total
Rams	0	0	0	10	0	10
Vikings	0	3	0	7	0	10

at Metropolitan Stadium, Bloomington, Minnesota

- Date: September 19, 1976
- Game time: 4:00 p.m. CDT
- Game weather: 67 °F (19 °C)
- Game attendance: 47,310
- Referee: Fred Silva
- TV announcers (CBS): Pat Summerall and Tom Brookshier
- Pro-Football-Reference.com

Game information
First quarter
- No scoring plays.

Second quarter

- MIN – Fred Cox 33-yard field goal. Vikings 3–0.

Third quarter

- No scoring plays.

Fourth quarter

- MIN – Sammy White 56-yard pass from Fran Tarkenton (Fred Cox kick). Vikings 10–0.
- LAR – Tom Dempsey 42-yard field goal. Vikings 10–3.
- LAR – Jim Bertelsen 1-yard run (Tom Dempsey kick). Tied 10–10.

==== Week 3: at Detroit Lions ====
Week 3: Minnesota Vikings at Detroit Lions – Game summary

Quarter	1	2	3	4	Total
Vikings	0	0	3	7	10
Lions	0	0	3	6	9

at Pontiac Silverdome, Pontiac, Michigan

- Date: September 26, 1976
- Game time: 1:00 p.m. (CDT)
- Game weather: None (indoor stadium)
- Game attendance: 77,292
- Pro-Football-Reference.com

Game information
First quarter
- No scoring plays.

Second quarter

- No scoring plays.

Third quarter

- MIN – Fred Cox 49-yard field goal. Vikings 3–0.
- DET – Errol Mann 49-yard field goal. Tied 3–3.

Fourth quarter

- MIN – Chuck Foreman 5-yard run (Cox kick). Vikings 10–3.
- DET – Charlie Sanders 1-yard pass from Greg Landry (kick failed). Vikings 10–9.

==== Week 4: vs. Pittsburgh Steelers ====
Week 4: Pittsburgh Steelers at Minnesota Vikings – Game summary

Quarter	1	2	3	4	Total
Steelers	6	0	0	0	6
Vikings	0	7	0	10	17

at Metropolitan Stadium, Bloomington, Minnesota

- Date: October 4, 1976
- Game time: 8:00 p.m. (CDT)
- Game weather: 65 °F (18 °C)
- Game attendance: 47,809
- Referee: Pat Haggerty
- TV announcers (ABC): Howard Cosell, Alex Karras and Frank Gifford
- Pro-Football-Reference.com

Game information
First quarter
- PIT – Bennie Cunningham 1-yard pass from Terry Bradshaw (kick failed). Steelers 6–0.

Second quarter

- MIN – Chuck Foreman 8-yard run (Fred Cox kick). Vikings 7–6.

Third quarter

- No scoring plays.

Fourth quarter

- MIN – Chuck Foreman 4-yard run (Fred Cox kick). Vikings 14–6.
- MIN – Fred Cox 43-yard field goal. Vikings 17–6.

==== Week 5: vs. Chicago Bears ====
Week 5: Chicago Bears at Minnesota Vikings – Game summary

Quarter	1	2	3	4	Total
Bears	0	0	13	6	19
Vikings	7	10	0	3	20

at Metropolitan Stadium, Bloomington, Minnesota

- Date: October 10, 1976
- Game time: 1:00 p.m. (CDT)
- Game weather: 48 °F (9 °C)
- Game attendance: 47,614
- Pro-Football-Reference.com

Game information
First quarter
- MIN – Chuck Foreman 5-yard run (Fred Cox kick). Vikings 7–0.

Second quarter

- MIN – Fred Cox 29-yard field goal. Vikings 10–0.
- MIN – Chuck Foreman 1-yard run (Fred Cox kick). Vikings 17–0.

Third quarter

- CHI – Walter Payton 13-yard run (Bob Thomas kick). Vikings 17–7.
- CHI – Walter Payton 11-yard run (kick failed). Vikings 17–13.

Fourth quarter

- MIN – Fred Cox 39-yard field goal. Vikings 20–13.
- CHI – Roland Harper 7-yard run (kick failed). Vikings 20–19.

==== Week 6: vs. New York Giants ====
Week 6: New York Giants at Minnesota Vikings – Game summary

Quarter	1	2	3	4	Total
Giants	0	7	0	0	7
Vikings	10	7	0	7	24

at Metropolitan Stadium, Bloomington, Minnesota

- Date: October 17, 1976
- Game time: 1:00 p.m. (CDT)
- Game weather: 37 °F (3 °C)
- Game attendance: 46,508
- Pro-Football-Reference.com

Game information
First quarter
- MIN – Fred Cox 23-yard field goal. Vikings 3–0.
- MIN – Nate Allen 28-yard blocked punt return (Fred Cox kick). Vikings 10–0.

Second quarter

- NYG – Doug Kotar 3-yard run (Joe Danelo kick). Vikings 10–7.
- MIN – Chuck Foreman 41-yard pass from Fran Tarkenton (Fred Cox kick). Vikings 17–7.

Third quarter

- No scoring plays.

Fourth quarter

- MIN – Brent McClanahan 3-yard pass from Fran Tarkenton (Fred Cox kick). Vikings 24–7.

==== Week 7: at Philadelphia Eagles ====
Week 7: Minnesota Vikings at Philadelphia Eagles – Game summary

Quarter	1	2	3	4	Total
Vikings	0	7	10	14	31
Eagles	0	9	0	3	12

at Veterans Stadium, Philadelphia, Pennsylvania

- Date: October 24, 1976
- Game time: 12:00 p.m. (CDT)
- Game weather: 48 °F (9 °C)
- Game attendance: 56,233
- Pro-Football-Reference.com

Game information
First quarter
- No scoring plays.

Second quarter

- PHI – Horst Muhlmann 19-yard field goal. Eagles 3–0.
- PHI – Harold Carmichael 3-yard pass from Mike Boryla (kick failed). Eagles 9–0.
- MIN – Ahmad Rashad 5-yard pass from Fran Tarkenton (Fred Cox kick). Eagles 9–7.

Third quarter

- MIN – Fred Cox 32-yard field goal. Vikings 10–9.
- MIN – Sammy White 35-yard pass from Fran Tarkenton (Fred Cox kick). Vikings 17–9.

Fourth quarter

- PHI – Horst Muhlmann 21-yard field goal. Vikings 17–12.
- MIN – Chuck Foreman 32-yard run (Fred Cox kick). Vikings 24–12.
- MIN – Chuck Foreman 2-yard run (Fred Cox kick). Vikings 31–12.

==== Week 8: at Chicago Bears ====
Week 8: Minnesota Vikings at Chicago Bears – Game summary

Quarter	1	2	3	4	Total
Vikings	0	3	3	7	13
Bears	7	0	0	7	14

at Soldier Field, Chicago, Illinois

- Date: October 31, 1976
- Game time: 1:00 p.m. (CDT)
- Game weather: 45 °F (7 °C)
- Game attendance: 53,602
- Pro-Football-Reference.com

Game information
First quarter
- CHI – Walter Payton 39-yard run (Bob Thomas kick). Bears 7–0.

Second quarter

- MIN – Fred Cox 24-yard field goal. Bears 7–3.

Third quarter

- MIN – Fred Cox 24-yard field goal. Bears 7–6.

Fourth quarter

- CHI – Johnny Musso 3-yard run (Bob Thomas kick). Bears 14–6.
- MIN – Fran Tarkenton 2-yard run (Fred Cox kick). Bears 14–13.

==== Week 9: vs. Detroit Lions ====
Week 9: Detroit Lions at Minnesota Vikings – Game summary

Quarter	1	2	3	4	Total
Lions	3	6	7	7	23
Vikings	7	3	7	14	31

at Metropolitan Stadium, Bloomington, Minnesota

- Date: November 7, 1976
- Game time: 3:00 p.m. (CST)
- Game weather: 28 °F (−2 °C)
- Game attendance: 46,735
- Pro-Football-Reference.com

Game information
First quarter
- DET – Benny Ricardo 22-yard field goal. Lions 3–0.
- MIN – Sammy White 24-yard pass from Fran Tarkenton (Fred Cox kick). Vikings 7–3.

Second quarter

- DET – Lawrence Gaines 1-yard run (kick failed). Lions 9–7.
- MIN – Fred Cox 39-yard field goal. Vikings 10–9.

Third quarter

- MIN – Chuck Foreman 2-yard run (Fred Cox kick). Vikings 17–9.
- DET – Lawrence Gaines 1-yard run (Benny Ricardo kick). Vikings 17–16.

Fourth quarter

- MIN – Chuck Foreman 1-yard run (Fred Cox kick). Vikings 24–16.
- DET – Larry Walton 26-yard pass from Greg Landry (Benny Ricardo kick). Vikings 24–23.
- MIN – Sammy White 37-yard pass from Fran Tarkenton (Fred Cox kick). Vikings 31–23.

==== Week 10: vs. Seattle Seahawks ====
Week 10: Seattle Seahawks at Minnesota Vikings – Game summary

Quarter	1	2	3	4	Total
Seahawks	7	0	7	7	21
Vikings	7	7	6	7	27

at Metropolitan Stadium, Bloomington, Minnesota

- Date: November 14, 1976
- Game time: 1:00 p.m. (CST)
- Game weather: 24 °F (−4 °C)
- Game attendance: 45,087
- Pro-Football-Reference.com

Game information
First quarter
- MIN – Brent McClanahan 1-yard run (Fred Cox kick). Vikings 7–0.
- SEA – Jim Zorn 12-yard run (John Leypoldt kick). Tied 7–7.

Second quarter

- MIN – Sammy White 29-yard pass from Fran Tarkenton (Fred Cox kick). Vikings 14–7.

Third quarter

- SEA – Steve Raible 80-yard pass from Jim Zorn (John Leypoldt kick). Tied 14–14.
- MIN – Fred Cox 43-yard field goal. Vikings 17–14.
- MIN – Fred Cox 39-yard field goal. Vikings 20–14.

Fourth quarter

- SEA – Sam McCullum 7-yard pass from Jim Zorn (John Leypoldt kick). Seahawks 21–20.
- MIN – Stu Voigt 5-yard pass from Fran Tarkenton (Fred Cox kick). Vikings 27–21.

==== Week 11: at Green Bay Packers ====
Week 11: Minnesota Vikings at Green Bay Packers – Game summary

Quarter	1	2	3	4	Total
Vikings	3	7	0	7	17
Packers	3	0	7	0	10

at Milwaukee County Stadium, Milwaukee, Wisconsin

- Date: November 21, 1976
- Game time: 1:00 p.m. (CST)
- Game weather: 33 °F (1 °C)
- Game attendance: 53,104
- Pro-Football-Reference.com

Game information
First quarter
- GB – Chester Marcol 23-yard field goal. Packers 3–0.
- MIN – Fred Cox 41-yard field goal. Tied 3–3.

Second quarter

- MIN – Robert Miller 4-yard pass from Fran Tarkenton (Fred Cox kick). Vikings 10–3.

Third quarter

- GB – John Brockington 1-yard run (Chester Marcol kick). Tied 10–10.

Fourth quarter

- MIN – Ahmad Rashad 11-yard pass from Fran Tarkenton (Fred Cox kick). Vikings 17–10.

==== Week 12: at San Francisco 49ers ====
Week 12: Minnesota Vikings at San Francisco 49ers – Game summary

Quarter	1	2	3	4	Total
Vikings	0	13	3	0	16
49ers	7	10	0	3	20

at Candlestick Park, San Francisco, California

- Date: November 29, 1976
- Game time: 9:00 p.m. (PST)
- Game weather: 48 °F (9 °C)
- Game attendance: 56,775
- Referee: Don Wedge
- TV announcers (ABC): Howard Cosell, Alex Karras, Frank Gifford
- Pro-Football-Reference.com

Game information
First quarter
- SF – Wilbur Jackson 2-yard run (Steve Mike-Mayer kick). 49ers 7–0.

Second quarter

- SF – Steve Mike-Mayer 45-yard field goal. 49ers 10–0.
- MIN – Sammy White 18-yard pass from Fran Tarkenton (Fred Cox kick). 49ers 10–7.
- MIN – Ahmad Rashad 8-yard pass from Fran Tarkenton (kick failed). Vikings 13–10.
- SF – Scott Bull 1-yard run (Steve Mike-Mayer kick). 49ers 17–13.

Third quarter

- MIN – Fred Cox 37-yard field goal. 49ers 17–16.

Fourth quarter

- SF – Steve Mike-Mayer 38-yard field goal. 49ers 20–16.

==== Week 13: vs. Green Bay Packers ====
Week 13: Green Bay Packers at Minnesota Vikings – Game summary

Quarter	1	2	3	4	Total
Packers	6	0	0	3	9
Vikings	0	3	3	14	20

at Metropolitan Stadium, Bloomington, Minnesota

- Date: December 5, 1976
- Game time: 1:00 p.m. (CST)
- Game weather: 18 °F (−8 °C)
- Game attendance: 43,700
- Pro-Football-Reference.com

Game information
First quarter
- GB – Ollie Smith 12-yard pass from Carlos Brown (kick failed). Packers 6–0.

Second quarter

- MIN – Fred Cox 34-yard field goal. Packers 6–3.

Third quarter

- MIN – Fred Cox 30-yard field goal. Tied 6–6.

Fourth quarter

- MIN – Chuck Foreman 1-yard run (Fred Cox kick). Vikings 13–6.
- GB – Chester Marcol 24-yard field goal. Vikings 13–9.
- MIN – Chuck Foreman 1-yard run (Fred Cox kick). Vikings 20–9.

==== Week 14: at Miami Dolphins ====
Week 14: Minnesota Vikings at Miami Dolphins – Game summary

Quarter	1	2	3	4	Total
Vikings	0	15	14	0	29
Dolphins	0	0	0	7	7

at Miami Orange Bowl, Miami, Florida

- Date: December 11, 1976
- Game time: 12:00 p.m. (CST)
- Game weather: 77 °F (25 °C)
- Game attendance: 46,543
- Pro-Football-Reference.com

Game information
First quarter
- No scoring plays.

Second quarter

- MIN – Sammy White 9-yard pass from Fran Tarkenton (kick failed). Vikings 6–0.
- MIN – Sammy White 36-yard pass from Fran Tarkenton (kick failed). Vikings 12–0.
- MIN – Fred Cox 30-yard field goal. Vikings 15–0.

Third quarter

- MIN – Brent McClanahan 1-yard run (Fred Cox kick). Vikings 22–0.
- MIN – Sammy White 7-yard pass from Fran Tarkenton (Fred Cox kick). Vikings 29–0.

Fourth quarter

- MIA – Stan Winfrey 2-yard pass from Don Strock (Garo Yepremian kick). Vikings 29–7.

=== Standings ===
NFC Central
	W	L	T	PCT	DIV	CONF	PF	PA	STK
Minnesota Vikings^{(1)}	11	2	1	.821	5–1	9–2–1	305	176	W2
Chicago Bears	7	7	0	.500	4–2	7–5	253	216	L1
Detroit Lions	6	8	0	.429	2–4	4–8	262	220	L2
Green Bay Packers	5	9	0	.357	1–5	5–8	218	299	W1

== Postseason ==
=== Schedule ===
Week	Date	Opponent	Result	Venue	Attendance
Divisional	December 18	Washington Redskins	W 35–20	Metropolitan Stadium	47,221
NFC Championship	December 26	Los Angeles Rams	W 24–13	Metropolitan Stadium	47,191
Super Bowl XI	January 9	Oakland Raiders	L 14–32	Rose Bowl	100,421

=== Game summaries ===
==== NFC Divisional Playoffs: vs. (#4) Washington Redskins ====
NFC Divisional Playoffs: (#4) Washington Redskins at (#1) Minnesota Vikings – Game summary

Quarter	1	2	3	4	Total
Redskins	3	0	3	14	20
Vikings	14	7	14	0	35

at Metropolitan Stadium, Bloomington, Minnesota

- Date: December 18, 1976
- Game time: 12:00 p.m. CST
- Game weather: 31 °F (−1 °C)
- Game attendance: 47,221
- TV announcers (CBS): Vin Scully and Paul Hornung
- Pro-Football-Reference.com

Game information

First quarter

- MIN – Stu Voigt 18-yard pass from Fran Tarkenton (Fred Cox kick). Vikings 7–0.
- WAS – Mark Moseley 47-yard field goal. Vikings 7–3.
- MIN – Sammy White 27-yard pass from Fran Tarkenton (Fred Cox kick). Vikings 14–3.

Second quarter

- MIN – Chuck Foreman 2-yard run (Fred Cox kick). Vikings 21–3.

Third quarter

- MIN – Chuck Foreman 30-yard run (Fred Cox kick). Vikings 28–3.
- WAS – Mark Moseley 35-yard field goal. Vikings 28–6.
- MIN – Sammy White 9-yard pass from Fran Tarkenton (Fred Cox kick). Vikings 35–6.

Fourth quarter

- WAS – Frank Grant 12-yard pass from Billy Kilmer (Mark Moseley kick). Vikings 35–13.
- WAS – Roy Jefferson 3-yard pass from Billy Kilmer (Mark Moseley kick). Vikings 35–20.

Top passers

- WAS – Billy Kilmer – 26/49, 298 yards, 2 TD, 2 INT
- MIN – Fran Tarkenton – 12/21, 170 yards, 3 TD, 2 INT

Top rushers

- WAS – Mike Thomas – 11 rushes, 45 yards
- MIN – Chuck Foreman – 20 rushes, 105 yards, 2 TD

Top receivers

- WAS – Frank Grant – 6 receptions, 70 yards, TD
- MIN – Sammy White – 4 receptions, 64 yards, 2 TD

The Vikings jumped to a 35–6 lead by the end of the third quarter, led by running backs Chuck Foreman and Brent McClanahan who each rushed for more than 100 yards.

McClanahan's career-long 41-yard run on Minnesota's first play of the game set up quarterback Fran Tarkenton's 18-yard touchdown pass to tight end Stu Voigt. Washington defensive back Eddie Brown gave his team some early scoring opportunities with big special teams plays, first returning the kickoff 26 yards to the 38-yard line, and later returning a punt 17 yards to the Vikings 45. But the team was unable to capitalize. All they could do after the kickoff return was go three-and-out, and on the first play after his big punt return, Billy Kilmer threw a pass that was intercepted by Bobby Bryant. Now momentum seemed slipping away, but on the first play after Bryant's pick, Washington took the ball right back with an interception by safety Jake Scott, who returned it 17 yards to the Minnesota 34-yard line. Three plays later, Mark Moseley kicked a 47-yard field goal that cut the Washington deficit to 7–3. Later in the quarter, Minnesota drove 66 yards and scored when Tarkenton threw a 27-yard pass to Sammy White. Safety Ken Houston deflected the ball, but it still bounced to White, who made a diving, juggling catch for a touchdown to put the Vikings up 14–3. By the end of the first quarter, the Vikings had gained 143 yards, while holding Washington to 18 yards and no first downs.

The situation only got worse for Washington in the second quarter. A promising drive for them into Vikings territory ended with no points when Moseley missed a 51-yard field goal attempt. Minnesota then drove 66 yards, featuring a 35-yard completion from Tarkenton to Ahmad Rashad, to score on Foreman's 2-yard touchdown run, putting them up 21–3. The Redskins next drive ended with an interception by Vikings defensive back Nate Wright. On the next play, Houston intercepted the ball from Tarkenton and returned it 8 yards to the Vikings 38. But Washington was unable to move the ball and had to punt. In the final seconds of the half, Washington had a chance for a touchdown with a deep throw from Kilmer to receiver Frank Grant. Grant had broken open in the end zone, but was unable to make the catch and the pass fell incomplete.

Washington had to punt on the first drive of the second half, and Leonard Willis returned it 10 yards to the Vikings 48, where Minnesota proceeded to drive to a 28–3 lead on a 30-yard touchdown burst by Foreman. This time the Redskins were able to respond, converting a 20-yard catch by tight end Jean Fugett, a 20-yard run by Mike Thomas, and a 10-yard reception by fullback John Riggins into a 35-yard Moseley field goal, making the score 28–6. But after this, the Vikings drove 77 yards and scored on a 9-yard pass from Tarkenton to White. By the time Kilmer completed two touchdown passes in the fourth quarter, the game was already out of reach.

==== NFC Championship: vs. (#3) Los Angeles Rams ====
NFC Championship Game: (#3) Los Angeles Rams at (#1) Minnesota Vikings – Game summary

Quarter	1	2	3	4	Total
Rams	0	0	13	0	13
Vikings	7	3	7	7	24

at Metropolitan Stadium, Bloomington, Minnesota

- Date: December 26, 1976
- Game time: 12:00 p.m. CST
- Game weather: Sunny, 19 °F (−7 °C)
- Game attendance: 48,379
- Referee: Dick Jorgensen
- TV announcers (CBS): Pat Summerall and Tom Brookshier
- Boxscore

Game information

First quarter

- MIN – Bobby Bryant 90-yard blocked field goal return (Fred Cox kick). Vikings 7–0.

Second quarter

- MIN – Fred Cox 25-yard field goal. Vikings 10–0.

Third quarter

- MIN – Chuck Foreman 1-yard run (Fred Cox kick). Vikings 17–0.
- LA – Lawrence McCutcheon 10-yard run (kick failed). Vikings 17–6.
- LA – Harold Jackson 5-yard pass from Pat Haden (Tom Dempsey kick). Vikings 17–13.

Fourth quarter

- MIN – Sammy Johnson 12-yard run (Fred Cox kick). Vikings 24–13.

Top passers

- LA – Pat Haden – 9/22, 161 yards, TD, 2 INT
- MIN – Fran Tarkenton – 12/27, 143 yards, 1 INT

Top rushers

- LA – Lawrence McCutcheon – 26 rushes, 128 yards, TD
- MIN – Chuck Foreman – 15 rushes, 118 yards, TD

Top receivers

- LA – Harold Jackson – 4 receptions, 70 yards, TD
- MIN – Chuck Foreman – 5 receptions, 81 yards

The Vikings forced a blocked field goal, a blocked punt, and two interceptions en route to the victory over the Rams. On offense, running back Chuck Foreman rushed for 118 yards and a touchdown on just 15 carries while also catching 5 passes for 81 yards.

In the first quarter, the Rams got off to a good start as they marched down the field to the Viking 2-yard line. The drive stalled there, and coach Chuck Knox, recalling the NFC championship game in Minnesota two years ago (when the Rams were intercepted in the end zone after driving to the Viking 2-yard line) ordered a field goal attempt. Nate Allen blocked the field goal attempt, and the ball bounced off the ground right into the waiting arms of Bobby Bryant, who returned it 90 yards for a Minnesota touchdown. The first quarter ended with the Rams dominating the stat sheet. They had run 22 plays for 89 yards and 7 first downs, while holding the Vikings to 5 plays, one first down, and 17 yards, but they still trailed 7–0.

In the second quarter, linebacker Matt Blair blocked and recovered a punt on the Rams 10-yard line to set up Fred Cox's 25-yard field goal to give the Vikings a 10–0 lead before halftime. Then in the third period, Foreman rushed 62 yards to the Los Angeles 2-yard line, and scored on a 1-yard touchdown run two plays later to increase the lead 17–0.

The Rams rallied back with two quick touchdowns in the third quarter. After a chance to put the game away was wiped out by Monte Jackson's interception of a Tarkenton pass in the end zone, Pat Haden led the Rams on an 80-yard drive highlighted by a 40-yard pass to Harold Jackson, and culminating in a 10-yard touchdown run by Lawrence McCutcheon. Rams kicker Tom Dempsey missed the extra point. Dempsey had missed nine extra points during the season. Announcers Pat Summerall and Tom Brookshier speculated that Haden was feeling pressure on this drive because Knox had James Harris warming up on the sidelines. On the Vikings' next drive, Fred Dryer hit Fran Tarkenton on a sack, forcing a fumble that was recovered by Jack Youngblood at the Viking 8-yard line. Three plays later, Haden hit Jackson for a 5-yard touchdown pass.

Late in the fourth quarter, the Vikings defense snuffed out two big chances for LA to take the lead. With 7 minutes left, the Rams drove to a third down on the Vikings 33, but Minnesota linebacker Wally Hilgenberg sacked Haden and forced a punt. With 2:40 left in the game, Los Angeles advanced to the Minnesota 39-yard line. On fourth down and needing more than a field goal, Haden thought he had Jackson open deep near the goal line, but Bryant intercepted the pass (his second of the game) rather than batting it down. A few plays later, Tarkenton dumped a short pass off to Foreman, which he turned into a 57-yard gain. Foreman was injured on the play, but backup running back Sammy Johnson scored the clinching touchdown from 12 yards out.

This turned out to be the last playoff game at Metropolitan Stadium. The Vikings played four playoff games between 1977 and 1981, all on the road. Minnesota's next home playoff game came after the strike-shortened 1982 season, the Vikings' first in the Hubert H. Humphrey Metrodome. They would next host an outdoor home playoff game in January 2016.

To date, this is the most recent NFC Championship that the Vikings have won.

==== Super Bowl XI: vs. (#1) Oakland Raiders ====
Super Bowl XI: Oakland Raiders 32, Minnesota Vikings 14 – Game summary

Quarter	1	2	3	4	Total
Raiders	0	16	3	13	32
Vikings	0	0	7	7	14

at Rose Bowl, Pasadena, California

- Date: January 9, 1977
- Game time: 12:50 p.m. (PST)
- Game weather: 53 °F (12 °C)
- TV announcers (NBC): Curt Gowdy and Don Meredith
- Pro-Football-Reference.com

Game information

First quarter

- No scoring plays.

Second quarter

- OAK – Errol Mann 24-yard field goal. Raiders 3–0.
- OAK – Dave Casper 1-yard pass from Ken Stabler (Errol Mann kick). Raiders 10–0.
- OAK – Pete Banaszak 1-yard run (kick failed). Raiders 16–0.

Third quarter

- OAK – Errol Mann 40-yard field goal. Raiders 19–0.
- MIN – Sammy White 8-yard pass from Fran Tarkenton (Fred Cox kick). Raiders 19–7.

Fourth quarter

- OAK – Pete Banaszak 2-yard run (Errol Mann kick). Raiders 26–7.
- OAK – Willie Brown 75-yard interception return (kick failed). Raiders 32–7.
- MIN – Stu Voigt 13-yard pass from Bob Lee (Fred Cox kick). Raiders 32–14.

Top passers

- OAK – Ken Stabler – 12/19, 180 yards, TD
- MIN – Fran Tarkenton – 17/35, 205 yards, TD, 2 INT

Top rushers

- OAK – Clarence Davis – 16 rushes, 137 yards
- MIN – Chuck Foreman – 17 rushes, 44 yards

Top receivers

- OAK – Fred Biletnikoff – 4 receptions, 79 yards
- MIN – Chuck Foreman – 5 receptions, 62 yards

== Statistics ==
=== Team leaders ===
Category	Player(s)	Value
Passing yards	Fran Tarkenton	2,961
Passing touchdowns	Fran Tarkenton	17
Rushing yards	Chuck Foreman	1,155
Rushing touchdowns	Chuck Foreman	13
Receiving yards	Sammy White	906
Receiving touchdowns	Sammy White	10
Points	Fred Cox	89
Kickoff return yards	Leonard Willis	552
Punt return yards	Leonard Willis	207
Interceptions	Nate Wright	7

=== League rankings ===
Category	Total yards	Yards per game	NFL rank (out of 28)
Passing offense	2,855	203.9	4th
Rushing offense	2,003	143.1	18th
Total offense	4,858	347.0	6th
Passing defense	1,575	112.5	1st
Rushing defense	2,096	149.7	17th
Total defense	3,671	262.2	6th
