= 1974 Green Bay Packers season =

NFL team season

- General manager: Dan Devine
- Head coach: Dan Devine
- Home stadium: Lambeau Field; Milwaukee County Stadium

Results
- Record: 6–8
- Division place: 3rd NFC Central
- Playoffs: Did not qualify

The 1974 Green Bay Packers season was their 56th season overall and their 54th season in the National Football League. The team finished with a 6–8 record under fourth-year head coach Dan Devine, a consecutive third-place finish in the NFC Central division. The Packers lost their last three games, all to non-playoff teams.

After Week 6, the 3–3 Packers traded five future draft picks to the Los Angeles Rams for veteran quarterback John Hadl, who had recently been benched in favor of James Harris. The trade occurred the day after the Packers' offense (under quarterback Jerry Tagge) managed only three field goals in a 10–9 road loss to rival Chicago on Monday night. The Packers had defeated the Rams 17–6 in Milwaukee the week prior, intercepting four passes.

With a year remaining on his five-year contract, Devine resigned a day after the last game of the regular season and returned to college football at Notre Dame, following the sudden retirement of Ara Parseghian. Devine was succeeded as head coach at Green Bay by Hall of Fame quarterback Bart Starr, hired on Christmas Eve.

== Offseason ==
=== Draft ===
1974 Green Bay Packers draft
Round	Pick	Player	Position	College	Notes
1	12	Barty Smith	Fullback	Richmond	
5	116	Steve Odom *	Wide receiver	Utah	
6	134	Don Woods	Running back	New Mexico	
6	142	Ken Payne	Wide receiver	Langston	
7	168	Bart Purvis	Offensive tackle	Maryland	
8	194	Monte Doris	Linebacker	USC	
9	220	Harold Holton	Offensive guard	UTEP	
10	246	Doug Troszak	Defensive tackle	Michigan	
11	272	Eric Torkelson	Running back	UConn	
12	298	Randy Walker	Punter	Northwestern State	
13	324	Emmanuel Armstrong	Linebacker	San Jose State	
14	350	Andrew Neloms	Defensive tackle	Kentucky State	
15	376	Dave Wannstedt	Offensive tackle	Pittsburgh	
16	402	Mark Cooney	Linebacker	Colorado	
17	428	Randall Woodfield	Wide receiver	Portland State	
Made roster † Pro Football Hall of Fame * Made at least one Pro Bowl during career

=== Undrafted free agents ===
1974 undrafted free agents of note
Player	Position	College
Michael Basinger	Defensive end	UC Riverside
Tyrone Byrd	Wide receiver	Dartmouth
John Cherry	Quarterback	Missouri
Gary Cox	Tackle	Ball State
Brent Longwell	Tight end	Nebraska
Zaven Yaralian	Safety	Nebraska

== Roster ==
1974 Green Bay Packers roster
Quarterbacks: 10 Jack Concannon; 12 John Hadl; 17 Jerry Tagge; Running backs: 42 John Brockington; 25 Les Goodman; 30 Larry Krause; 36 MacArthur Lane; 23 Charles Leigh; 33 Barty Smith; 26 Eric Torkelson; Wide receivers: 84 Steve Odom; 85 Ken Payne; 80 Barry Smith; 22 Jon Staggers; Tight ends: 86 Mike Donohoe; 81 Rich McGeorge	Offensive linemen: 68 Gale Gillingham G; 72 Dick Himes T; 62 Bill Lueck G; 54 Larry McCarren C; 70 Lee Nystrom T; 52 John Schmitt C; 79 Harry Schuh T; 67 Malcolm Snider G; 65 Keith Wortman T; Defensive linemen: 71 Mike Fanucci DE; 76 Mike McCoy DT; 73 Steve Okoniewski DT; 75 Dave Pureifory DT/DE; 87 Alden Roche DT; 83 Clarence Williams DE	Linebackers: 57 Ron Acks OLB; 53 Fred Carr OLB; 50 Jim Carter MLB; 58 Mark Cooney OLB; 51 Larry Hefner MLB; 56 Ted Hendricks OLB; 55 Noel Jenke OLB; Defensive backs: 28 Willie Buchanon CB; 48 Ken Ellis CB; 21 Charlie Hall SS; 39 Jim Hill FS; 43 Dave Mason FS; 29 Al Matthews SS; 45 Perry Smith CB; Special teams: 13 Chester Marcol K; 18 Randy Walker P	Reserve lists: -- Ken Bowman C (IR); 74 Aaron Brown DE (IR); 16 Tyrone Byrd WR (IR); 77 Bill Hayhoe T (IR); 11 Charlie Napper QB (IR); 64 Bart Purvis T (IR); 59 Tom Toner LB (IR); 61 Bruce Van Dyke G (IR); 69 Dave Wannstedt T (IR); 20 Ron Widby P (IR); Rookies in italics

== Regular season ==
=== Schedule ===
Week	Date	Opponent	Result	Record	Venue	Attendance
1	September 15	**Minnesota Vikings**	**L** 17–32	0–1	Lambeau Field	56,267
2	September 22	at Baltimore Colts	**W** 20–13	1–1	Memorial Stadium	41,252
3	September 29	**Detroit Lions**	**W** 21–19	2–1	Milwaukee County Stadium	47,292
4	October 6	Buffalo Bills	**L** 7–27	2–2	Lambeau Field	56,267
5	October 13	Los Angeles Rams	**W** 17–6	3–2	Milwaukee County Stadium	47,499
6	October 21	at **Chicago Bears**	**L** 9–10	3–3	Soldier Field	50,623
7	October 27	at **Detroit Lions**	**L** 17–19	3–4	Tiger Stadium	51,775
8	November 3	Washington Redskins	**L** 6–17	3–5	Lambeau Field	56,267
9	November 10	**Chicago Bears**	**W** 20–3	4–5	Milwaukee County Stadium	46,567
10	November 17	at **Minnesota Vikings**	**W** 19–7	5–5	Metropolitan Stadium	47,924
11	November 24	San Diego Chargers	**W** 34–0	6–5	Lambeau Field	56,267
12	December 1	at Philadelphia Eagles	**L** 14–36	6–6	Veterans Stadium	42,030
13	December 8	at San Francisco 49ers	**L** 6–7	6–7	Candlestick Park	47,475
14	December 15	at Atlanta Falcons	**L** 3–10	6–8	Atlanta Stadium	10,020

Monday (October 21)

Note: Intra-division opponents are in bold text.

=== Game summaries ===
==== Week 1 vs Vikings ====
Week One: Minnesota Vikings (0–0) at Green Bay Packers (0–0)

Quarter	1	2	3	4	Total
**Vikings**	3	7	13	9	**32**
Packers	0	10	0	7	**17**

at Lambeau Field, Green Bay, Wisconsin

- Date: September 15
- Game time: 1:00 p.m. CST
- Game weather: 60 °F (16 °C)
- Game attendance: 56,267
- Box Score

Game information

**First quarter**

- MIN – Fred Cox 20-yard field goal. Vikings 3–0. Drive:

**Second quarter**

- GB – Chester Marcol 19-yard field goal. Tie 3–3. Drive:
- GB – John Brockington 5-yard run (Chester Marcol kick). Packers 10–3. Drive:
- MIN – Chuck Foreman 18-yard run (Fred Cox kick). Tie 10–10. Drive:

**Third quarter**

- MIN – Chuck Foreman 1-yard run (Fred Cox kick). Vikings 17–10. Drive:
- MIN – Chuck Foreman 3-yard run (kick failed). Vikings 23–10. Drive:

**Fourth quarter**

- MIN – Fred Cox 21-yard field goal. Vikings 26–10. Drive:
- GB – Steve Odom 18-yard run (Chester Marcol kick). Vikings 26–17. Drive:
- MIN – Amos Martin 15-yard fumble return (kick failed). Vikings 32–17.

Top passers

- MIN – Fran Tarkenton – 14/23, 116 yards, INT
- GB – Jerry Tagge – 9/20, 102 yards, 3 INT

Top rushers

- MIN – Chuck Foreman – 22 rushes, 67 yards, 3 TD
- GB – John Brockington – 18 rushes, 53 yards, TD

Top receivers

- MIN – Chuck Foreman – 5 receptions, 32 yards
- GB – Barry Smith – 2 receptions, 29 yards

==== Week 2 at Colts ====
Week Two: Green Bay Packers (0–1) at Baltimore Colts (0–1)

Quarter	1	2	3	4	Total
**Packers**	3	10	7	0	**20**
Colts	3	3	0	7	**13**

at Memorial Stadium, Baltimore, Maryland

- Date: September 22
- Game time: 2:00 p.m. EST
- Game weather: 61 °F (16 °C)
- Game attendance: 41,252
- Box Score

Game information

**First quarter**

- GB – Chester Marcol 52-yard field goal. Packers 3–0. Drive:
- BAL – Toni Linhart 37-yard field goal. Tie 3–3. Drive:

**Second quarter**

- GB – MacArthur Lane 1-yard run (Chester Marcol kick). Packers 10–3. Drive:
- GB – Chester Marcol 39-yard field goal. Packers 13–3. Drive:
- BAL – Toni Linhart 23-yard field goal. Packers 13–6. Drive:

**Third quarter**

- GB – MacArthur Lane 13-yard run (Chester Marcol kick). Packers 20–6. Drive:

**Fourth quarter**

- BAL – Bill Olds 7-yard pass from Bert Jones (Toni Linhart kick). Packers 20–13. Drive:

Top passers

- GB – Jerry Tagge – 10/16, 109 yards, INT
- BAL – Bert Jones – 7/16, 88 yards, TD, INT

Top rushers

- GB – MacArthur Lane – 22 rushes, 36 yards, 2 TD
- BAL – Lydell Mitchell – 18 rushes, 63 yards

Top receivers

- GB – Jon Staggers – 3 receptions, 52 yards
- BAL – Lydell Mitchell – 5 receptions, 47 yards

==== Week 3 ====
Team	1	2	3	4	Total
Lions	3	10	6	0	19
• **Packers**	0	8	10	3	21

- Date: September 29
- Location: Milwaukee County Stadium, Milwaukee, Wisconsin
- Game start: 1:00 p.m.
- Game weather: 52 °F (11 °C) • Wind 20 mph (32 km/h)

Scoring summary
1	DET	Errol Mann 37-yard field goal	Lions 3–0
2	DET	Errol Mann 26-yard field goal	Lions 6–0
2	GB	Safety, Ted Hendricks blocked punt out of end zone	Lions 6–2
2	GB	Chester Marcol 35-yard field goal	Lions 6–5
2	DET	Larry Walton 39-yard pass from Bill Munson (Errol Mann kick)	Lions 13–5
2	GB	Chester Marcol 36-yard field goal	Lions 13–8
3	DET	Errol Mann 41-yard field goal	Lions 16–8
3	GB	Chester Marcol 41-yard field goal	Lions 16–11
3	GB	Barry Smith 27-yard pass from Jerry Tagge (Chester Marcol kick)	Packers 18–16
3	DET	Errol Mann 28-yard field goal	Lions 19–18
4	GB	Chester Marcol 22-yard field goal	Packers 21–19

==== Week 9 ====
Team	1	2	3	4	Total
Bears	3	0	0	0	3
• **Packers**	0	10	0	10	20

- Date: November 10
- Location: Milwaukee County Stadium, Milwaukee, Wisconsin
- Game start: 1:00 p.m. CST
- Game weather: 46 °F (8 °C), wind 9 mph (14 km/h)
- Source: Pro-Football-Reference.com

Scoring summary
1	Bears	Mirro Roder 44-yard field goal	Bears 3–0
2	Packers	Chester Marcol 45-yard field goal	Tie 3–3
2	Packers	Steve Odom 95-yard punt return (Chester Marcol kick)	Packers 10–3
4	Packers	Chester Marcol 24-yard field goal	Packers 13–3
4	Packers	John Brockington 1-yard run (Chester Marcol kick)	Packers 20–3

=== Standings ===
NFC Central
	W	L	T	PCT	DIV	CONF	PF	PA	STK
Minnesota Vikings	10	4	0	.714	4–2	8–3	310	195	W3
Detroit Lions	7	7	0	.500	3–3	6–5	256	270	L1
Green Bay Packers	6	8	0	.429	3–3	4–7	210	206	L3
Chicago Bears	4	10	0	.286	2–4	4–7	152	279	L2

== Awards and records ==
- Chester Marcol, NFL Leader, Field Goals Made, (25)
- Don Woods, NFL Offensive Rookie of the Year
