= 1975 Detroit Lions season =

46th season in franchise history; first in the Silverdome

- Owner: William Clay Ford Sr.
- Head coach: Rick Forzano
- Home stadium: Pontiac Metropolitan Stadium

Results
- Record: 7–7
- Division place: 2nd NFC Central
- Playoffs: Did not qualify
- All-Pros: None
- Pro Bowlers: 2: TE Charlie Sanders; CB Lem Barney

The 1975 Detroit Lions season was the 46th season in franchise history. It was the first season for the Detroit Lions at the new Pontiac Metropolitan Stadium in Pontiac, a Detroit suburb, which was built specifically for the team. It was also their first ever season outside Detroit since the franchise's move and name change in 1934; its first three seasons were played in Portsmouth, Ohio as the Portsmouth Spartans. For the seventh consecutive season, the Lions finished the season in second place.

== Offseason ==
=== NFL draft ===
1975 Detroit Lions draft
Round	Pick	Player	Position	College	Notes
1	13	Lynn Boden	G	South Dakota State	
2	38	Doug English *	DT	Texas	
4	94	Craig Hertwig	OT	Georgia	
6	138	Fred Cooper	DB	Purdue	from New Orleans
6	141	Horace King	RB	Georgia	from New England
6	144	Dennis Franklin	WR	Michigan	
7	169	Mike Murphy	WR	Drake	
8	194	Leonard Thompson	RB	Oklahoma State	
9	219	Steve Strinko	LB	Michigan	
10	250	Brad Boyd	TE	LSU	
11	275	Steve Myers	G	Ohio State	
12	300	Andre Roundtree	LB	Iowa State	
13	325	James Smith	RB	North Carolina Central	
14	350	Jim McMillan	QB	Widener	
15	375	Rudy Green	RB	Yale	
16	406	Les Chaves	DB	Kansas State	
17	431	Mark Lancaster	G	Tulsa	
Made roster * Made at least one Pro Bowl during career

Notes

- Detroit traded its third-round pick (91st) to Minnesota in exchange for S Charlie West.
- Detroit traded its fifth-round pick (119th) to Cleveland in exchange for CB Ben Davis.
- Detroit traded TE Dave Thompson and its first-round pick (13th) in 1974 to New Orleans in exchange for the Saints' first-round pick (8th) in 1974 and sixth-round pick (138th) in this draft.
- Detroit traded FB Leon Crosswhite to New England in exchange for the Patriots' sixth-round pick (141st) and eighth-round pick in 1976.
- Detroit traded LB Jim Teal to Los Angeles in exchange for the Rams' ninth-round pick (229th), and then traded this pick to Denver in exchange for CB Leroy Mitchell.

== Personnel ==
=== Staff / Coaches ===
1975 Detroit Lions staff
Front office: Owner / Team President - William Clay Ford, Sr.; Senior / Executive Vice President - Edwin J. Anderson; Vice President / General manager - Russ Thomas; Assistant General Manager - Rogers Lebew; Coordinator of Personnel / Scouting - Tommy Hudspeth; Treasurer - Newton S. Peters; Publicity Director / Business Manager - Lyall Smith; Assistant Publicity Director - Elliott Trumbull; Equipment manager - Roy Marklem; Assistant equipment manager - Dan Jaroschewich; Head coaches: Head coach / Offensive Coordinator – Rick Forzano; Assistant Head Coach - Bruce Beatty; Offensive coaches: Offensive Backs - Wally English; Offensive Line - Bruce Beatty; Interior Offensive Line - Joe Bugel; Wide Receivers - Raymond Berry	Defensive coaches: Defensive Backfield / Secondary - Jim Carr; Defensive Line Coach - Fritz Shurmur; Linebackers Coach - Jerry Glanville; Special teams coaches: Special teams - Rey Dempsey; Strength and conditioning: Strength and Conditioning - Floyd Reese; Trainer - Kent Falb; Assistant Trainer - Bruce Scott

=== Final roster ===
1975 Detroit Lions roster
Quarterbacks: 10 Jack Concannon; 11 Greg Landry; 14 Joe Reed; Running backs: 24 Dexter Bussey; 30 Jim Hooks; 25 Horace King; 42 Altie Taylor; 33 Bobby Thompson; Wide receivers: 48 Marlin Briscoe; 44 George Farmer; 45 Ray Jarvis; 39 Leonard Thompson; Tight ends: 81 John McMakin; 88 Charlie Sanders	Offensive linemen: 62 Lynn Boden G; 68 Guy Dennis G; 76 Rocky Freitas T; 71 Craig Hertwig T; 60 R. W. Hicks C; 66 Bob Kowalkowski G; 63 Jon Morris C; 75 Jim Yarbrough T; Defensive linemen: 78 Doug English DT; 74 Larry Hand DE; 70 Billy Howard DE; 83 Jim Mitchell DE; 80 Herb Orvis DT; 72 Ernie Price DE; 82 Ken Sanders DE	Linebackers: 51 Larry Ball OLB; 52 Jim Laslavic MLB; 60 Paul Naumoff OLB; 55 Ed O'Neil OLB; 59 Charlie Weaver OLB; Defensive backs: 20 Lem Barney CB; 29 Ben Davis CB; 32 Lenny Dunlap CB; 26 Dick Jauron FS; 23 Levi Johnson CB; 28 Mike Weger FS; 40 Charlie West SS; Special teams: 12 Errol Mann K; 18 Herman Weaver P	Reserve lists: 89 Dennis Franklin WR (IR); 58 Mike Hennigan LB (IR); 64 Gordon Jolley G (IR); 19 Bill Munson QB (IR); 36 Steve Owens RB (IR); -- Andre Roundtree LB (IR); 86 Jon Staggers WR (IR); -- Steve Strinko LB (IR); 21 Jim Thrower S (IR); 49 Larry Walton WR (IR); _{43 active, 10 reserve, 0 practice / taxi squad} rookies in italics

== Regular season ==
=== Schedule ===
Week	Date	Opponent	Result	Record	Venue	Attendance
1	September 21	at **Green Bay Packers**	**W** 30–16	1–0	Milwaukee County Stadium	52,613
2	September 28	at Atlanta Falcons	**W** 17–14	2–0	Atlanta Fulton County Stadium	45,218
3	October 6	Dallas Cowboys	**L** 10–36	2–1	Pontiac Metropolitan Stadium	79,384
4	October 12	**Chicago Bears**	**W** 27–7	3–1	Pontiac Metropolitan Stadium	74,032
5	October 19	at **Minnesota Vikings**	**L** 19–25	3–2	Metropolitan Stadium	47,872
6	October 26	at Houston Oilers	**L** 8–24	3–3	Astrodome	46,904
7	November 2	at San Francisco 49ers	**W** 28–17	4–3	Candlestick Park	43,209
8	November 9	Cleveland Browns	**W** 21–10	5–3	Pontiac Metropolitan Stadium	75,283
9	November 16	**Green Bay Packers**	**W** 13–10	6–3	Pontiac Metropolitan Stadium	76,946
10	November 23	at Kansas City Chiefs	**L** 21–24_{(OT)}	6–4	Arrowhead Stadium	55,161
11	November 27	Los Angeles Rams	**L** 0–20	6–5	Pontiac Metropolitan Stadium	69,552
12	December 7	at **Chicago Bears**	**L** 21–25	6–6	Soldier Field	37,772
13	December 14	**Minnesota Vikings**	**W** 17–10	7–6	Pontiac Metropolitan Stadium	73,130
14	December 21	St. Louis Cardinals	**L** 13–24	7–7	Pontiac Metropolitan Stadium	64,656

- Note: Intra-division opponents are in **bold** text.

=== Game summaries ===
==== Week 2 ====
Team	1	2	3	4	Total
• Lions	0	7	3	7	17
Falcons	0	7	7	0	14

- Date: September 28
- Location: Atlanta Stadium, Atlanta
- Game start: 1:00 p.m.
- Game weather: 62 °F or 16.7 °C, wind 9 miles per hour (14 km/h; 7.8 kn)

Scoring summary
2	ATL	Haskel Stanback 17 yard run (Nick Mike-Mayer kick)	Falcons 7–0
2	DET	Horace King 5 yard run (Errol Mann kick)	Tie 7–7
3	ATL	Gerald Tinker 26 yard pass from Steve Bartkowski (Nick Mike-Mayer kick)	Falcons 14–7
3	DET	Errol Mann 29 yard field goal	Falcons 14–10
4	DET	Altie Taylor 1 yard run (Errol Mann kick)	Lions 17–14

=== Standings ===
NFC Central
	W	L	T	PCT	DIV	CONF	PF	PA	STK
^{(1)} Minnesota Vikings	12	2	0	.857	5–1	8–2	377	180	W1
Detroit Lions	7	7	0	.500	4–2	6–5	245	262	L1
Chicago Bears	4	10	0	.286	2–4	4–7	191	379	W1
Green Bay Packers	4	10	0	.286	1–5	4–7	226	285	W1
