= 1976 Chicago Bears season =

NFL team season

- Owner: George Halas
- General manager: Jim Finks
- Head coach: Jack Pardee
- Home stadium: Soldier Field

Results
- Record: 7–7
- Division place: 2nd NFC Central
- Playoffs: Did not qualify

The 1976 Chicago Bears season was their 57th regular season completed in the National Football League. The team finished with a 7–7 record, in their second season under Jack Pardee. The .500 record and second-place finish were the team's best since 1968. This was also the first season for the Chicago Honey Bears, the team's official cheerleading squad.

== Offseason ==
=== 1976 expansion draft ===
Chicago Bears selected during the expansion draft
Round	Overall	Name	Position	Expansion team
0	0	Bubba Broussard	Linebacker	Tampa Bay Buccaneers
0	0	Earl Douthitt	Safety	Tampa Bay Buccaneers
0	0	Larry Ely	Linebacker	Tampa Bay Buccaneers

=== NFL draft ===
1976 Chicago Bears draft
Round	Pick	Player	Position	College	Notes
1	8	Dennis Lick	Offensive tackle	Wisconsin	
3	66	Brian Baschnagel	Wide receiver	Ohio State	
4	103	John Sciarra	Safety	UCLA	
4	108	Wayne Rhodes	Defensive back	Alabama	
6	161	Dan Jiggetts	Offensive tackle	Harvard	
7	190	Jerry Muckensturm	Linebacker	Arkansas State	
11	299	Norman Anderson	Wide receiver	UCLA	
12	330	John O'Leary	Running back	Nebraska	
13	357	Dale Kasowski	Running back	North Dakota	
14	384	Ron Cuie	Running back	Oregon State	
15	411	Jerry Meyers	Defensive tackle	Northern Illinois	
16	442	Ronald Parker	Tight end	TCU	
17	469	Mike Malham	Linebacker	Arkansas State	
Made roster

=== Undrafted free agents ===
1976 undrafted free agents of note
Player	Position	College
Rudy Allen	Wide receiver	Georgia Tech
Gary Evans	Defensive back	Northeast Missouri State
Bill Marek	Running back	Wisconsin
Ivy Moore	Wide receiver	Southern Illinois
Mike Morgan	Defensive back	Washburn
Vernon Perry	Defensive back	Jackson State
Jim Pooler	Running back	Northwestern
Steve Studer	Guard/Center	Bowling Green
Jeff Tryon	Defensive back	Boise State

== Roster ==
1976 Chicago Bears roster
Quarterbacks (QB): 7 Bob Avellini; 9 Virgil Carter; 19 Gary Huff; Running backs (RB): 20 Mike Adamle; 35 Roland Harper; 22 Johnny Musso; 34 Walter Payton; 36 Larry Schreiber; Wide receivers (WR): 47 Brian Baschnagel; 83 Randall Burks; 80 Bo Rather; 85 Steve Schubert; 89 James Scott; Tight ends (TE): 81 Bob Bruer; 88 Greg Latta	Offensive linemen (OL): 79 Lionel Antoine T; 65 Noah Jackson G; 62 Dan Jiggetts T; 70 Dennis Lick T; 52 Dan Neal C; 75 Jeff Sevy G/T; 69 Revie Sorey G; 73 John Ward G/C; Defensive linemen (DL): 82 Royce Berry DE; 60 Wally Chambers DT; 73 Mike Hartenstine DE; 74 Jerry Meyers DE/DT; 68 Jim Osborne DT; 76 Ron Rydalch DT; 71 Roger Stillwell DE	Linebackers (LB): 50 Waymond Bryant OLB; 59 Ross Brupbacher OLB; 54 Tom Hicks MLB; 57 Don Rives MLB; Defensive backs (DB): 45 Craig Clemons SS; 48 Allan Ellis CB; 45 Gary Fencik SS; 31 Bill Knox CB; 24 Virgil Livers CB; 46 Doug Plank FS; 44 Terry Schmidt CB; Special teams (ST): 86 Bob Parsons P; 16 Bob Thomas K	Reserve: 55 Doug Buffone LB (IR); 72 Gary Hrivnak DE/DT (IR); 51 Mickey Malham LB (IR); 58 Jerry Muckensturm LB (IR); 53 Dan Peiffer C (IR); 25 Ronnie Shanklin WR (IR); Rookies in italics

== Regular season ==
=== Schedule ===
Week	Date	Opponent	Result	Record	Venue	Attendance
1	September 12	**Detroit Lions**	**W** 10–3	1–0	Soldier Field	54,125
2	September 19	at San Francisco 49ers	**W** 19–12	2–0	Candlestick Park	44,158
3	September 26	Atlanta Falcons	**L** 0–10	2–1	Soldier Field	41,029
4	October 3	Washington Redskins	**W** 33–7	3–1	Soldier Field	52,105
5	October 10	at **Minnesota Vikings**	**L** 19–20	3–2	Metropolitan Stadium	47,614
6	October 17	at Los Angeles Rams	**L** 12–20	3–3	Los Angeles Memorial Coliseum	71,751
7	October 24	at Dallas Cowboys	**L** 21–31	3–4	Texas Stadium	61,346
8	October 31	**Minnesota Vikings**	**W** 14–13	4–4	Soldier Field	53,602
9	November 7	Oakland Raiders	**L** 27–28	4–5	Soldier Field	53,585
10	November 14	**Green Bay Packers**	**W** 24–13	5–5	Soldier Field	52,907
11	November 21	at **Detroit Lions**	**L** 10–14	5–6	Pontiac Municipal Stadium	78,042
12	November 28	at **Green Bay Packers**	**W** 16–10	6–6	Lambeau Field	56,267
13	December 5	at Seattle Seahawks	**W** 34–7	7–6	Kingdome	60,510
14	December 12	Denver Broncos	**L** 14–28	7–7	Soldier Field	44,459
Note: Intra-division opponents are in **bold** text.

=== Standings ===
NFC Central
	W	L	T	PCT	DIV	CONF	PF	PA	STK
Minnesota Vikings^{(1)}	11	2	1	.821	5–1	9–2–1	305	176	W2
Chicago Bears	7	7	0	.500	4–2	7–5	253	216	L1
Detroit Lions	6	8	0	.429	2–4	4–8	262	220	L2
Green Bay Packers	5	9	0	.357	1–5	5–8	218	299	W1

=== Season summary ===
==== Week 1 vs Lions ====
Week One: Detroit Lions (0–0) at Chicago Bears (0–0)

Quarter	1	2	3	4	Total
Lions	0	3	0	0	**3**
**Bears**	0	0	7	3	**10**

at Soldier Field, Chicago, Illinois

- Date: September 12, 1976
- Game time: 2:00 p.m.
- Game weather: 69 °F (21 °C)
- Game attendance: 54,125
- Pro-Football-Reference.com

Game information

Second quarter

- DET – Errol Mann 27-yard field goal. Lions 3–0. Drive:

Third quarter

- CHI – Johnny Musso 3-yard run (Bob Thomas kick). Bears 7–3. Drive:

Fourth quarter

- CHI – Bob Thomas 27-yard field goal. Bears 10–3. Drive:

Top passers

- DET – Joe Reed – 11/23, 91 yards
- CHI – Bob Avellini – 7/16, 120 yards

Top rushers

- DET – Horace King – 15 rushes, 57 yards
- CHI – Walter Payton – 25 rushes, 70 yards

Top receivers

- DET – Ray Jarvis – 4 receptions, 85 yards
- CHI – Greg Latta – 2 receptions, 87 yards

==== Week 9 vs Raiders ====
Week Nine: Oakland Raiders (7–1) at Chicago Bears (4–4)

Quarter	1	2	3	4	Total
**Raiders**	0	14	7	7	**28**
Bears	7	0	20	0	**27**

at Soldier Field, Chicago, Illinois

- Date: November 7, 1976
- Game time: 2:00 p.m. EST
- Game weather: Sunny, 36 °F (2 °C)
- Game attendance: 53,585
- Referee: Chuck Heberling
- Box Score

Game information

**First quarter**

- CHI – Walter Payton 5-yard run (Bob Thomas kick). Bears 7–0. Drive:

**Second quarter**

- OAK – Dave Casper 17-yard pass from Ken Stabler (Errol Mann kick). Tie 7–7. Drive:
- OAK – Cliff Branch 75-yard pass from Ken Stabler (Errol Mann kick). Raiders 14–7. Drive:

**Third quarter**

- OAK – Clarence Davis 2-yard run (Errol Mann kick). Raiders 21–7. Drive:
- CHI – James Scott 36-yard pass from Bob Avellini (Bob Thomas kick). Raiders 21–14. Drive:
- CHI – Walter Payton 12-yard run (kick failed). Raiders 21–20. Drive:
- CHI – Walter Payton 2-yard run (Bob Thomas kick). Bears 27–21. Drive:

**Fourth quarter**

- OAK – Cliff Branch 49-yard pass from Ken Stabler (Errol Mann kick). Raiders 28–27. Drive:

Top passers

- OAK – Ken Stabler – 11/17, 234 yards, 3 TD
- CHI – Bob Avellini – 10/18, 204 yards, TD, INT

Top rushers

- OAK – Mark van Eeghen – 12 rushes, 62 yards
- CHI – Walter Payton – 36 rushes, 97 yards, 3 TD

Top receivers

- OAK – Cliff Branch – 5 receptions, 163 yards, 2 TD
- CHI – James Scott – 3 receptions, 76 yards, TD

== Awards and honors ==
- UPI Coach of the Year – Jack Pardee
