= Nate Allen =

Nate Allen may refer to:

- Nate Allen (cornerback) (born 1948), former NFL cornerback
- Nate Allen (safety) (born 1987), former NFL safety
