= Jon Staggers =

American football player (born 1948)

No. 2, 22, 86
- Position: Wide receiver

Personal information
- Born: December 14, 1948 (age 77); Richmond, Virginia, U.S.
- Listed height: 5 ft 10 in (1.78 m)
- Listed weight: 185 lb (84 kg)

Career information
- High school: Helias Catholic (Jefferson City, Missouri)
- College: Missouri
- NFL draft: 1970: 5th round, 105th overall pick

Career history
- Pittsburgh Steelers (1970–1971); Green Bay Packers (1972–1974); Detroit Lions (1975)

Awards and highlights
- Second-team All-Big Eight (1969)

Career NFL statistics
- Receptions: 93
- Receiving yards: 1,380
- Touchdowns: 7
- Stats at Pro Football Reference

Jonathan Leroy Staggers Jr. (born December 14, 1948) is an American former professional football player who was a wide receiver in the National Football League (NFL). He was a star football player for Helias High School in Jefferson City, Missouri. He played college football for the Missouri Tigers, starring as a running back/wide receiver before playing six seasons in the NFL for the Pittsburgh Steelers, Green Bay Packers, and Detroit Lions. He is the first cousin of tennis great Arthur Ashe. His father, Jonathan Staggers, was a basketball coach at Lincoln University Hayward State University and Claflin College

== Professional career ==
Staggers started his career with two years with the Pittsburgh Steelers: 1970 and 1971. The Steelers drafted him out of the University of Missouri in the fifth round (105th overall) in 1970. This was the same draft in which the Steelers picked two future Pro Football Hall of Famers: Terry Bradshaw and Mel Blount. Shortly before the start of the 1972 season, the Steelers waived Staggers and the Green Bay Packers claimed him on September 13, 1972.

Staggers played for the Packers from 1972 to 1974. 1973 and 1974 proved to be the most productive seasons of his career. Staggers led the Packers both seasons in both receiving yardage and punt return yardage. His 85 yard punt return for a touchdown against the Houston Oilers in 1972 was the longest punt return that season. But with the Packers under the new management of Bart Starr, Staggers lost his wide receiver starting job to Ken Payne, and his punt return job to rookie Willard Harrell, and the Packers waived him shortly before the start of the season. The Detroit Lions claimed him off of waivers on September 22, 1975. Staggers played in five games as a wide receiver for the Lions, starting in four. Unlike with the Steelers and Packers, however, he was not used as a punt returner in Detroit.

== Post-career honors ==
The 1969 University of Missouri Tigers football team, of which Staggers was a member, was inducted into the Missouri Sports Hall of Fame. The Associated Press ranked them as the #6 team in the nation at the close of the season. The team was coached by Dan Devine, who would later coach Staggers with the Packers. Staggers was one of five members of the 1969 Tigers to play in the NFL, including wide receiver Mel Gray.

== Post-NFL life ==
After an injury led to his retirement from pro football, Staggers spent six years working as an actor at the American Conservatory Theater. Since 1998, he has been a Breema instructor and practitioner in the San Francisco Bay Area. He studied under spiritual teacher Dr. Jean Klein and Way of the Peaceful Warrior author Dan Millman. He also serves on the Players Advisory Board of the Northern California Chapter of the National Football League Alumni.
