= Larry Hand =

American football player (born 1940)

No. 74
- Position: Defensive end

Personal information
- Born: July 10, 1940 (age 86); Paterson, New Jersey, U.S.
- Listed height: 6 ft 4 in (1.93 m)
- Listed weight: 250 lb (113 kg)

Career information
- High school: Butler (Butler, New Jersey)
- College: Appalachian State (1960–1964)
- NFL draft: 1964: 10th round, 132nd overall pick
- AFL draft: 1964: 21st round, 163rd overall pick

Career history
- Detroit Lions (1965–1977)

Awards and highlights
- First-team NAIA All-American (1964); CIAC Most Valuable Player (1964); Appalachian State Mountaineers No. 71 retired

Career NFL statistics
- Sacks: 62.5
- Fumble recoveries: 8
- Interceptions: 5
- Interception yards: 110
- Defensive touchdowns: 3
- Stats at Pro Football Reference

Lawrence Thomas Hand (born July 10, 1940) is an American former professional football player who was a defensive end for 13 seasons with the Detroit Lions of the National Football League (NFL) from 1965 to 1977. He was selected as the Lions' most valuable player in 1972.

A native of Paterson, New Jersey, he played college football for the Appalachian State Mountaineers and was selected as a first-team NAIA All-American in 1964. He is one of only five Appalachian State football players to have had his jersey number (71) retired.

== Early life ==
Hand was born in 1940 in Paterson, New Jersey, grew up in West Milford, New Jersey, and attended Butler High School. When he began high school, he was five feet, six inches tall, and weighed 135 pounds. He did not play varsity football until his senior year and, even then, was not a starter. After graduating from high school, Hand took a job working as a mason in Butler.

== College football ==
Hand grew to be six feet, four inches tall, and 215 pounds, and enrolled at Appalachian State Teachers College in Boone, North Carolina. He began playing college football for the Appalachian State Mountaineers football team in 1962 at age 22 under head coach Jim Duncan. At the end of his junior year in 1963, he was unanimously selected as a first-team tackle on the All-Carolinas Conference football team. He was also selected as the outstanding lineman in the conference. After his senior year, he was selected as the most valuable player in the Carolinas Conference. He was also named to the NAIA All-America team, and was the only player selected as a first-team player on both the offensive and defensive units of the NAIA District 26 team—he was picked as a tackle on offense and an interior lineman on defense. His #71 jersey was later retired by Appalachian State, one of only four Appalachian State jerseys to be retired.

== Professional football ==
In December 1963, the Detroit Lions selected Hand as a "future selection" in the 10th round of the 1964 NFL draft. As a rookie in 1965, Hand share responsibility at the right defensive end position with Sam Williams. He appeared in all 14 games at defensive end for the Lions in the 1965, 1966, and 1967 seasons. On October 1, 1967, he scored his first NFL touchdown on an interception against Cardinals' quarterback Jim Hart. He had a total of two interceptions for touchdowns during the 1967 season.

In September 1968, Hand sustained torn ligaments to his knee in the season opener, underwent surgery, and missed the remainder of the 1968 season. In 1969, he held out for the first two weeks of training camp, but re-signed with the Lions in late July. Hand returned to his position as the Lions' right defensive end, starting all 14 games during the 1969, 1970, 1971, 1972, and 1973 seasons. He had a 62-yard interception return for touchdown in 1970 and was selected as the defensive most valuable player for the 1972 Lions. In 1973, Hand again held out during the early weeks of training camp, finally signing a contract in early August.

In 1974, Hand appeared in 13 games at defensive end for the Lions, eight as a starter. In 1975, the Lions moved Hand from his regular spot at right defensive end to right defensive tackle. He started all 14 games for the Lions at that position during the 1975 season and 10 more in 1976. In May 1975, he was honored with a ceremony in his hometown of Butler, New Jersey, in which he was presented with the key to the city. On November 14, 1976, in the 10th game of the season, Hand injured his knee against the New Orleans Saints and missed the remainder of the season.

In April 1977, Hand tested the waters as a free agent and received an offer from the Houston Oilers. The Lions matched the Oilers' offer, and Hand returned to the Lions. He appeared in all 14 games for the Lions in 1977, but was not a starter. In August 1978, the Lions placed Hand on waivers, ending his NFL career. At the time of his retirement, Hand's 164 games with the Lions ranked fourth in franchise history behind Wayne Walker, Dick LeBeau, and Darris McCord.

== Later life ==
In the early 1980s, Hand moved to the Winston-Salem area in North Carolina. He worked for many years as a stock broker for E.F. Hutton and Co., Inc. and lived in the Winston-Salem area with his wife, Darlene.
