= Stars Football League =

- Sport: American football
- Founded: 2011
- CEO: Peter Hulthwaite
- Country: United States
- Most recent champions: Miami Ironmen (2013)
- Website: starsfootballleague.com

The Stars Football League (SFL) was an American football league that operated primarily in Florida from 2011 to 2013. The league was headquartered in Grosse Pointe, Michigan.

It was a single-entity league and players were paid a few hundred dollars a game, while teams revenue came from tickets, concessions and sponsorships. The SFL also bought airtime on local radio stations and tried to sells shares in the league.

== Rules ==
The league followed standard American football rules, with two exceptions. Field goals of over 50 yards were awarded four points instead of three, as in NFL Europe. The league also offered a three-point conversion from ten yards (1-2-3 rule), just as the original XFL did in its playoffs. These rule changes were intended to help teams that fall behind in a game to catch up more quickly. In 2013 the rule became a 1-2-3-4 rule with 4 points awarded for passing or running the ball into the endzone from 20 Yards out. The league did not use instant replay (the league never acquired a television contract, making instant replay impossible). The league also used a slightly shorter play clock.

Teams were restricted to 35 or 36 players on each roster, with any person 18 years of age or older eligible to play. Its level of play could be classified somewhere between minor league and semi-professional; players were compensated between $100 and $500 per game, on par with most indoor football leagues, but had to pay their own travel expenses for away games.

== Teams ==
Team	City	Stadium	Years	Head coach
Daytona Beach Racers	Daytona Beach, Florida	Municipal Stadium (2011)	2011–2013	Dahryll Brown
Ft. Lauderdale Barracudas	Fort Lauderdale, Florida	Central Broward Regional Park (2012–13)	2011–2013	Bobby Thompson
Swampdogs F.C. (Ft. Myers/Pompano)	Fort Myers, Florida	Bishop Verot High School (2012)	2012–2013	Marty Culpepper
Miami Ironmen	Miami, Florida	Central Broward Regional Park	2013	Brian "Hurricane" Jones
Michigan Coyotes	Pontiac, Michigan	Traveling team	2011	Jitter Fields & Ron Johnson
New Orleans Jazz F.C.	New Orleans, Louisiana	Tad Gormley Stadium	2011	Blaine Bond

== 2011 season ==
The League awarded charter memberships to eight cities in seven states. Teams were awarded to Las Vegas (Nevada), Little Rock (Arkansas), Pontiac (Michigan), New Orleans (Louisiana), Mobile (Alabama), and Charleston (South Carolina), along with Daytona Beach and Fort Lauderdale (Florida). For reasons unknown the Las Vegas Gamblers, Little Rock Ironmen, Charleston Admirals and the Mobile Gladiators never made it to play; the Ironmen, in particular, have been the subject of repeated relocations (the SFL has indicated the Ironmen club would play in Little Rock, then Bradenton, Florida, then Cleveland, Ohio, before finally beginning play in 2013 nominally representing Miami, Florida, and sharing a stadium with Fort Lauderdale).

The Michigan Coyotes, having a much greater distance between themselves and the rest of the league, were declared a traveling team for their two games in the 2011 season. Had any home games been scheduled the team was to play at the Silverdome (Wisner Stadium was another potential stadium that the league mentioned for the team). Fort Lauderdale played its first season at Lockhart Stadium and Daytona Beach at Municipal Stadium.

The league released its 2011 schedule on July 2, 2011; said schedule was abruptly cut short in early August after several on-the-fly schedule and venue changes. In the end, each of the four teams played two of the other three teams at least once, with Daytona Beach and Fort Lauderdale playing each other three times, due to their proximity to each other. Winners of each game are underlined.

=== Results ===
June 30, 2011
Daytona Beach 26 @ Fort Lauderdale 13
July 16, 2011
Fort Lauderdale 22 @ Daytona Beach 4
July 22, 2011
Fort Lauderdale 9 @ New Orleans 15 (OT)
July 23, 2011
Michigan 18 @ Daytona Beach 38
August 4, 2011
Fort Lauderdale 29 @ Daytona Beach 31
August 12, 2011
Michigan 6 @ New Orleans 21

=== Final standings ===
2011 Stars Football League
	W	L	PCT
New Orleans Jazz	2	0	1.000
Daytona Beach Racers	3	1	.750
Fort Lauderdale Barracudas	1	3	.250
Michigan Coyotes	0	2	.000

== 2012 season ==
The 2012 season was originally scheduled to begin on Armed Forces Day (May 19, 2012) and continue through July; although a northern division was originally planned in addition to the Florida teams, neither of the two new proposed teams (in Cleveland and Canton, Ohio) meant to complement the existing Michigan Coyotes (who were to play that year at Atwood Stadium in Flint) would form, eventually forcing the Coyotes' mothballing. New Orleans left the league and joined other semi-pro leagues. In Florida, the SFL also proposed a team named the "Orange" (initially in Tampa and then in Fort Pierce) and a team based at South County Stadium in Port St. Lucie, neither of which came to fruition; likewise, the plan to play a game in Freeport, Bahamas's Grand Bahama Stadium also never occurred. In the end, of the roughly eight teams originally announced as participants in the 2012 SFL season, only three would make it to play: Daytona Beach (who had originally left the league, only to return) and Fort Lauderdale, in addition to the Fort Myers Swampdogs (also known as the Southwest Florida Swampdogs), who played the season at Bishop Verot High School. Daytona Beach's lone home game (the season opener) would be held at Lawnwood Stadium in Fort Pierce.

The season finally began on June 9, 2012, with a matchup between Daytona Beach and Fort Lauderdale in Fort Pierce. Fort Lauderdale won the contest on a last-second field goal, by Garrett Ewald of Coral Springs. Fort Myers played its first game June 16.

=== Results ===
June 9, 2012
Fort Lauderdale 13 @ Daytona Beach 10 in Fort Pierce
June 16, 2012
Fort Myers 14 v. Fort Lauderdale 0 in Fort Pierce
June 30, 2012
Daytona Beach 16 @ Fort Myers 9
July 7, 2012
Daytona Beach 6 @ Fort Lauderdale 0
July 14, 2012
Fort Myers 10 @ Fort Lauderdale 21
July 28, 2012
Daytona Beach 16 @ Fort Lauderdale 14 (SFL Championship Game)

=== Final standings ===
2012 Stars Football League
	W	L	PCT
Daytona Beach Racers	2	1	.667
Fort Lauderdale Barracudas	2	2	.500
Fort Myers Swampdogs	1	2	.333

== 2013 season ==
After numerous proposals and another erroneous draft schedule was released in the 2012-13 offseason, by the time of the April 2013 training camps the league had settled on an expansion to four teams for the 2013 season, adding the Miami Ironmen. The league began play on June 8, 2013, with a baseball-style doubleheader in Fort Lauderdale.

Two days before the start of the season, the league also announced that all six of the SFL's scheduled games for 2013 will take place at Central Broward Regional Park. The Swampdogs were nonetheless renamed the "Pompano Swampdogs" despite no connection to that city; likewise, the league made no effort to relocate the Daytona Beach Racers back to its namesake city, although the team's head coach continued to send news reports to the local newspapers there. The schedule is single round-robin, with each team playing each other once.

=== Results ===
June 8, 2013
Swampdogs 8 v. Daytona Beach 6
June 8, 2013
Miami 18 @ Fort Lauderdale 14
June 15, 2013
Swampdogs 14 @ Fort Lauderdale 22
June 15, 2013
Daytona 6 v. Miami 42
June 27, 2013
Swampdogs 2 v. Miami 10
June 27, 2013
Daytona 0 @ Fort Lauderdale 7
July 2, 2013
Miami 14 @ Daytona 0 (Semifinal)
July 2, 2013
Swampdogs 12 @ Fort Lauderdale 8 (Semifinal)
July 6, 2013
Swampdogs 6 v. Miami 21 (SFL Championship Game)

=== Final standings ===
2013 Stars Football League
	W	L	PCT
Miami Ironmen	5	0	1.000
Fort Lauderdale Barracudas	2	2	.500
Pompano Swampdogs	2	3	.400
Daytona Beach Racers	0	4	.000

== Resolution ==
The team formally dismissed all of its coaches in February 2014 and ceased operations; the league released a draft schedule that was to begin the 2014 season in April, but the schedule was removed after none of the games were played and the 2014 season was silently canceled. Commissioner/owner Peter Hulthwaite announced the league's assets were up for sale on August 24, 2016.

As of 2026, the league's Web site remains active, with the most recent news mentioning a proposal for an ultimately unplayed 2021 season.
