= Ron Groce =

American football player (1954–2018)

No. 47
- Position: Running back

Personal information
- Born: July 1, 1954; Minneapolis, Minnesota, U.S.
- Died: March 21, 2018 (aged 63); Minneapolis, Minnesota, U.S.
- Listed height: 6 ft 2 in (1.88 m)
- Listed weight: 211 lb (96 kg)

Career information
- High school: Central (Minneapolis)
- College: Macalester
- NFL draft: 1976: 15th round, 428th overall pick

Career history
- Minnesota Vikings (1976); Green Bay Packers (1978)*
- * Offseason or practice squad member only
- Stats at Pro Football Reference

Ron Groce (July 1, 1954 – March 21, 2018) was an American football running back. He played for the Minnesota Vikings in 1976.

He died on March 21, 2018, in Minneapolis, Minnesota at age 63.
