= Andy Bolton (American football) =

American football player (born 1954)

No. 33, 43
- Position: Running back

Personal information
- Born: May 23, 1954 (age 72); Memphis, Tennessee, U.S.
- Listed height: 6 ft 1 in (1.85 m)
- Listed weight: 205 lb (93 kg)

Career information
- High school: Northside (Memphis)
- College: Fisk
- NFL draft: 1976: 4th round, 123rd overall pick

Career history
- Seattle Seahawks (1976); Detroit Lions (1976-1978)

Career NFL statistics
- Rushing attempts: 20
- Rushing yards: 80
- Receptions: 1
- Receiving yards: 6
- Stats at Pro Football Reference

Andrew Bolton (born May 23, 1954) is an American former professional football player who was a running back for the Seattle Seahawks and Detroit Lions of the National Football League (NFL). He played college football for the Fisk Bulldogs.
