= Breema =

Breema is a holistic practice integrating bodywork, movement exercises (Self-Breema), and the Nine Principles of Harmony. It is designed to balance life energy, enhance presence, and foster harmony among the body, mind, and feelings. Breema practices promote vitality and a deeper connection to oneself and others.

== History ==
Breema originated in the Near East and was brought to the United States with the founding of the Breema Center in 1980 in Oakland, California. Established by Jon Schreiber, D.C., the Breema Center became the world headquarters for teaching and promoting Breema.

== Philosophy ==
Breema is grounded in the belief that the body is an energy system. Its Nine Principles of Harmony provide a framework for living in greater balance:

1. Body Comfortable
2. No Extra
3. Firmness and Gentleness
4. Single Moment/Single Activity
5. No Hurry/No Pause
6. Full Participation
7. Mutual Support
8. No Judgment
9. No Force

The Nine Principles extend beyond bodywork, offering a philosophy applicable to daily life, including parenting, self-care, and relationships.

== Practice ==
=== Breema Bodywork ===
Breema bodywork is performed on a padded floor with recipients fully clothed. The practice involves stretches, rhythmic tapping, gentle leaning, and holding postures. Sessions typically last 30 minutes to an hour and aim to create a nurturing atmosphere that balances life energy.

=== Self-Breema Exercises ===
Self-Breema exercises are solo practices allowing individuals to experience being both giver and receiver. These natural, tension-free movements help release stress, enhance vitality, and support overall balance. Practicing Self-Breema fosters mindfulness, dexterity, and presence, providing tools for harmonious living.

=== Benefits ===
Breema promotes a nurturing connection between one’s body, mind, and emotions. This practice can support a state of balance, increased vitality, and enhanced clarity. Secondary benefits include tension release, improved posture, and greater receptivity to the present moment. Breema’s principles are particularly effective in cultivating mindfulness and finding harmony with oneself and others.

== Certification ==
The Breema Center offers ongoing classes and workshops as well as a 165-hour certification program, including training in bodywork, Self-Breema exercises, and the Nine Principles of Harmony. Certified practitioners may pursue advanced training to become instructors, a process requiring extensive experience and ongoing education.
