= Barty Smith =

American football player (born 1952)

No. 33
- Position: Running back

Personal information
- Born: March 23, 1952 (age 74); Richmond, Virginia, U.S.
- Listed height: 6 ft 3 in (1.91 m)
- Listed weight: 240 lb (109 kg)

Career information
- High school: Douglas Freeman (Henrico County, Virginia)
- College: Richmond
- NFL draft: 1974: 1st round, 12th overall pick

Career history
- Green Bay Packers (1974–1980)

Awards and highlights
- Third-team All-American (1973)

Career NFL statistics
- Rushing attempts: 544
- Rushing yards: 1,942
- Rushing TDs: 18
- Stats at Pro Football Reference

Barton Elliott "Barty" Smith (born March 23, 1952) is an American former professional football player who was a fullback for the Green Bay Packers of the National Football League (NFL).

== High school ==
Born in Richmond, Virginia, Smith graduated from Douglas S. Freeman High School where he was a four-sport star. Smith was selected as the Virginia High School Player of the Year in 1969. That same year he achieved the highest honor awarded to high school athletes when he was named to the Sunkist High School All-American Football Team.

== College career ==
Smith played football for the University of Richmond where he was recognized as one of the nations best all-around fullbacks. He starred in football at the University of Richmond from 1971 through 1973, twice being named to the All Southern Conference Football Team. Recognized as one of the all time Spider greats, Smith led the University of Richmond to the Southern Conference Title and an appearance in the Tangerine Bowl. He was the leader of the only Spider grid squad to be ranked in the Division 1 Top 20.

In 1972, Barty Smith was named as the recipient of the Jacobs Blocking Trophy presented to the Outstanding Blocker in the Southern Conference—an award which he repeated in 1973. He became the fourth Richmond Spider to be honored since the award's inception in 1933. In his senior year, Smith won the Coffman Award, representative of the Most Valuable Player in the East-West Shrine Game in San Francisco. He ranks 8th on the University of Richmond's rushing list with 1,941 yards and career touchdowns with 15.

In 1976, Smith was inducted into the University of Richmond Athletic Hall of Fame. In 1990, he was named to the University of Richmond All-Time Football Team and was inducted into the Virginia High School Hall of Fame in 1998.

== Professional career ==
After concluding a stellar career for the University of Richmond, Barty Smith was a first-round draft choice of the Green Bay Packers in 1974. He played with Green Bay from 1974 until 1980. Smith ranks 16th on the Packers all-time rushing list with 1,942 yards, scoring 18 career touchdowns. He won Packer Offensive Player of the Year honors in 1977.

== NFL career statistics ==
Legend
**Bold**	Career high

Year	Team	Games		Rushing					Receiving				
Year	Team	GP	GS	Att	Yds	Avg	Lng	TD	Rec	Yds	Avg	Lng	TD
1974	GNB	8	0	9	19	2.1	4	0	0	0	0.0	0	0
1975	GNB	14	2	60	243	**4.1**	17	4	16	140	8.8	33	**1**
1976	GNB	8	5	97	355	3.7	16	**5**	11	88	8.0	35	0
1977	GNB	14	14	**166**	554	3.3	11	2	**37**	**340**	**9.2**	**42**	**1**
1978	GNB	**16**	**16**	154	**567**	3.7	**33**	4	**37**	256	6.9	24	0
1979	GNB	6	6	57	201	3.5	23	3	19	155	8.2	22	**1**
1980	GNB	1	0	1	3	3.0	3	0	0	0	0.0	0	0
		67	43	544	1,942	3.6	33	18	120	979	8.2	42	3
