= Randy Walker (punter) =

American football player (born 1951)

No. 18
- Position: Punter

Personal information
- Born: August 29, 1951 (age 75); Shreveport, Louisiana, U.S.
- Listed height: 5 ft 10 in (1.78 m)
- Listed weight: 170 lb (77 kg)

Career information
- High school: Bossier (LA)
- College: Northwestern State
- NFL draft: 1974: 12th round, 298th overall pick

Career history
- Green Bay Packers (1974)

Career NFL statistics
- Games played: 14
- Punts: 69
- Punting yards: 2,684
- Rushing attempts: 1
- Rushing yards: 18
- Stats at Pro Football Reference

Randell Paul "Randy" Walker (born August 29, 1951) is a former punter in the National Football League (NFL). He was selected in the twelfth round of the 1974 NFL draft by the Green Bay Packers and played that season with the team.
