= Horace King (American football) =

American football player (born 1953)

No. 25
- Position: Running back

Personal information
- Born: March 5, 1953 (age 73); Athens, Georgia, U.S.
- Listed height: 5 ft 10 in (1.78 m)
- Listed weight: 208 lb (94 kg)

Career information
- High school: Clark Central (Athens)
- College: Georgia
- NFL draft: 1975: 6th round, 141st overall pick

Career history
- Detroit Lions (1975–1983)

Career NFL statistics
- Rushing attempts: 549
- Rushing yards: 2,081
- Rushing TDs: 9
- Stats at Pro Football Reference

Horace Edward King (born March 5, 1953) is an American former professional football player who was a running back for the Detroit Lions of the National Football League (NFL) from 1975 to 1983. He played college football for the Georgia Bulldogs from 1972 to 1974.

A native of Athens, Georgia, he played high school football at Clarke Central High School in that city. He next played at the University of Georgia from 1972 to 1974, totaling 1,673 yards from scrimmage. On October 12, 1974, he gained 134 yards and tied a Georgia record with four touchdowns against Ole Miss.

King was selected by the Detroit Lions in the sixth round of the 1975 NFL draft and played nine years for the Lions from 1975 to 1983. He was the Lions' leading rusher in 1977 when he totaled 521 rushing yards. His best season was 1978 when he started 15 games at fullback and totaled 1,056 yards from scrimmage (660 rushing and 396 receiving) and scored six touchdowns. In his nine-year NFL career, King totaled 2,081 rushing yards and 3,660 yards from scrimmage. He was cut by the Lions in late August 1984.

== NFL career statistics ==
Legend
**Bold**	Career high

=== Regular season ===
Year	Team	Games		Rushing					Receiving				
Year	Team	GP	GS	Att	Yds	Avg	Lng	TD	Rec	Yds	Avg	Lng	TD
1975	DET	14	0	61	260	**4.3**	26	2	13	81	6.2	22	0
1976	DET	7	7	93	325	3.5	22	0	21	163	7.8	19	0
1977	DET	14	13	**155**	521	3.4	35	1	40	238	6.0	30	0
1978	DET	15	**15**	**155**	**660**	**4.3**	**75**	**4**	**48**	**396**	8.3	34	**2**
1979	DET	**16**	4	39	160	4.1	23	1	18	150	8.3	30	0
1980	DET	**16**	0	18	57	3.2	8	1	19	184	9.7	29	1
1981	DET	**16**	0	7	25	3.6	7	0	21	217	**10.3**	**41**	1
1982	DET	9	1	18	67	3.7	25	0	9	74	8.2	14	1
1983	DET	**16**	1	3	6	2.0	4	0	9	76	8.4	14	0
		123	41	549	2,081	3.8	75	9	198	1,579	8.0	41	5

=== Playoffs ===
Year	Team	Games		Rushing					Receiving				
Year	Team	GP	GS	Att	Yds	Avg	Lng	TD	Rec	Yds	Avg	Lng	TD
1982	DET	**1**	0	**4**	**10**	**2.5**	**9**	0	**2**	**8**	**4.0**	**5**	0
1983	DET	**1**	0	0	0	0.0	0	0	0	0	0.0	0	0
		2	0	4	10	2.5	9	0	2	8	4.0	5	0
