= Chuck Foreman =

American football player (born 1950)

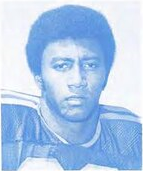
- Foreman in 1972

No. 44, 22
- Position: Running back

Personal information
- Born: October 26, 1950 (age 76); Frederick, Maryland, U.S.
- Listed height: 6 ft 2 in (1.88 m)
- Listed weight: 210 lb (95 kg)

Career information
- High school: Frederick
- College: Miami (FL) (1969–1972)
- NFL draft: 1973: 1st round, 12th overall pick

Career history
- Minnesota Vikings (1973–1979); New England Patriots (1980)

Awards and highlights
- NFL Offensive Rookie of the Year (1973); UPI NFC Offensive Player of the Year (1976); 2× First-team All-Pro (1975, 1976); 2× Second-team All-Pro (1974, 1977); 5× Pro Bowl (1973–1977); NFL receptions leader (1975); Minnesota Vikings Ring of Honor; 50 Greatest Vikings; Minnesota Vikings 25th Anniversary Team; Minnesota Vikings 40th Anniversary Team

Career NFL statistics
- Rushing yards: 5,950
- Rushing average: 3.8
- Rushing touchdowns: 53
- Receptions: 350
- Receiving yards: 3,156
- Receiving touchdowns: 23
- Stats at Pro Football Reference

Walter Eugene "Chuck" Foreman (born October 26, 1950) is an American former professional football player who was a running back for the Minnesota Vikings and the New England Patriots in the National Football League (NFL). Considered one of the best passing-catching backs in NFL history, Foreman started in three Super Bowls with the Vikings and was the premiere back for the team for most of the 1970s. Upon entering the league in 1973, he was named the NFL Offensive Rookie of the Year, and he was selected to the Pro Bowl for the first five seasons of his career. During this time, he was also named to the first-team All-Pro and second-team All-Pro teams two times each. Nicknamed "The Spin Doctor" for his elusive running abilities, Foreman held the Vikings franchise record for rushing yards from scrimmage upon his retirement. As part of the team's 50th anniversary celebration, Foreman was named as one of the 50 Greatest Vikings in 2010. The Professional Football Researchers Association named Foreman to the PRFA Hall of Very Good Class of 2010.

Foreman was raised in Frederick, Maryland and was a standout athlete in football, basketball, and track at Frederick High School. After attending the University of Miami, he was drafted 12th overall in the 1973 NFL draft by the Vikings. Foreman suffered a knee injury during the 1978 season, after which his skills declined, and he officially retired from professional football in 1980. Following his football career, Foreman was involved with numerous business ventures in the Twin Cities area. In 2000, he was arrested for his part in a mail fraud scheme, for which he was sentenced to probation. After sentencing, he began public speaking at schools and became a substitute teacher in Bloomington. In recent years, fans and former Vikings players have been trying to get Foreman elected to the Pro Football Hall of Fame. Chuck is currently a weekly headline contributor to the JimBob Sports Jamboree with Jim Rich, Bob Sansevere and Mike "The Superstar" Morris a Bob FM show.

== Early life and college career ==
Foreman was born and raised in Frederick, Maryland where he attended Frederick High School, competing in basketball, football, and track and field. Growing up, he was a fan of the Washington Redskins and the Baltimore Colts of the NFL as well as the Baltimore Bullets of the NBA. Playing the end position on the football team, he began incorporating the spin move into his running style after watching Bullets player Earl Monroe use the same maneuver while playing basketball, a move which inspired Foreman's nickname during his professional career. During his high school career, Foreman caught four touchdown passes in a single game against Bel Air High School. Although he received more scholarship offers for basketball than football, Foreman accepted a football scholarship from the University of Miami in 1970, as he enjoyed playing the sport more than basketball.

As a member of the Miami Hurricanes football team, Foreman played multiple positions in his college career. He was limited on offense during his 1970 sophomore campaign due to injuries in the team's defensive backfield, which necessitated that he change his position to cornerback. Fran Curci took over as head coach for the 1971 season and switched Foreman back to running back. That season, he combined with teammate Tom Sullivan to form a running back tandem nicknamed "The Gold Dust Twins" due to their running abilities. This was Foreman's finest statistical season as a ball-carrier, as he rushed 191 times for 951 yards. He also caught 7 passes for 72 yards that season and was named a first-team All American by the publication Sporting News. Foreman transitioned to wide receiver for his senior season, and although his production on the ground dipped to 484 yards on 107 carries, his receiving production increased to 557 yards on 37 receptions. Foreman finished his college career having never played in a bowl game.

Foreman had a noted issue with fumbling during his college career, which he attributed to holding the ball too loosely, resulting in it being knocked out of his hands by his knees while running. Foreman was instructed on proper ball-carrying technique by New York Jets coach Weeb Ewbank during the 1973 Senior Bowl, which helped to alleviate the issue in preparation for his professional career.

== Professional career ==
Foreman was drafted by the Minnesota Vikings with the 12th pick in the first round of the 1973 NFL Draft. He learned that he was drafted while sitting in his apartment at the University of Miami and at first felt consternation toward playing in Minnesota due to the cold, recalling a time in which flamethrowers were used to thaw the field of Metropolitan Stadium before a game. The Vikings were initially unsure how to utilize Foreman due to his experience playing multiple positions in college. He insisted on playing running back to prove wrong coach Curci, who had told him that he would never be able to play the position in the NFL.

During his rookie season, Foreman was inserted into the Vikings' offense as their premiere back, often catching passes out of the backfield in an offensive scheme that was a precursor to the West Coast offense. After rushing for 801 yards on 182 carries and catching 37 passes for 362 yards during the regular season, Foreman won the NFL Offensive Rookie of the Year Award and was voted to the Pro Bowl, helping the Vikings improve from a 7–7 record in 1972 to a 12–2 record and a NFC Central division championship in 1973. In the playoffs, the Vikings defeated the Washington Redskins in the divisional round and the Dallas Cowboys in the NFC Championship Game en route to a Super Bowl appearance against the Miami Dolphins. The Vikings lost Super Bowl VIII 24–7; Foreman was held to only 18 yards rushing and 27 yards receiving in the game. He later said that the Dolphins were the best team that the Vikings faced in the Super Bowl that decade.

In 1974, Foreman was again voted to the Pro Bowl and was selected as a second-team All-Pro by the Pro Football Writers Association, the Newspaper Enterprise Association, and the Associated Press. He ran for 777 yards on 199 attempts while adding 586 yards on 53 receptions and also led the league in combined rushing and receiving touchdowns with 15. Although the Vikings' record worsened to 10–4, they repeated as NFC Central champions and reached the Super Bowl for the second consecutive year, where they lost 16–6 to the Pittsburgh Steelers. Foreman only gained 18 yards on 12 carries and 50 yards on 5 receptions, yet he believes that the Vikings were the better team in the game, and the loss was a result of self-inflicted mistakes.

Although he was a running back, Foreman led the NFL with 73 receptions in 1975, which was an NFL record for his position at the time. In the final game of the regular season on the road against the Buffalo Bills, Foreman was in contention to complete an NFC Triple Crown by leading the conference in touchdowns, receptions, and rushing yards for a season. Foreman and Bills star running back O. J. Simpson were also competing to break Gale Sayers's NFL record for combined rushing and receiving touchdowns in a season. After scoring his third touchdown of the game, Foreman was struck in the eye by a snowball thrown by a Bills fan and suffered from blurred vision as a result. Although he later scored a fourth touchdown in the game to tie the record at 22, head coach Bud Grant pulled Foreman from the game for the fourth quarter as a precaution. Simpson broke the record on a 64-yard touchdown reception to bring his total on the season to 23. Later that day, Jim Otis of the St. Louis Cardinals surpassed Foreman's season rushing total by 6 yards. This left Foreman in second place with 1,070 yards, becoming the first 1,000-yard rusher in Vikings franchise history.

Foreman was awarded first-team All-Pro honors and appeared in a third-consecutive Pro Bowl for his 1975 season. The Vikings also won the NFC Central for a third-consecutive season with a 12–2 record. However, they were defeated in the divisional round of the playoffs by the Dallas Cowboys in what has become known as the Hail Mary Game, during which Cowboys quarterback Roger Staubach completed a game-winning 50-yard touchdown pass to Drew Pearson in the final seconds.

Foreman amassed 51 touchdowns over a three-year span (1974–1976), and he played in three Super Bowls with the Vikings. In game 7 of 1976, he became the only Viking to rush for 200 yards in a game until Adrian Peterson in 2007. In the 1976 divisional playoff round against the Washington Redskins, Chuck Foreman ran for 105 yards rushing and scored 2 touchdowns as the Vikings won 35-20. In the NFC Championship game against the Los Angeles Rams, Foreman rushed for 118 yards and a touchdown while catching 5 passes for 81 yards for a total of 199 yards from scrimmage, as the Vikings won the game 24-13. Then in Super Bowl XI against the Oakland Raiders, Foreman rushed for 44 yards and caught 5 passes for 62 yards for a total of 106 yards from scrimmage, but the Vikings lost 32-14. Injuries plagued Foreman throughout the 1978 and 1979 seasons and Foreman was subsequently traded to the New England Patriots, where he spent the 1980 season before retiring. He ended his career with 5,950 rushing yards on 1,556 carries (3.8 yard average), and 53 rushing touchdowns. He had 350 receptions, one of 51 receivers to reach that number up to that point. At the time he had retired, he was ranked 17th in league history in rushing yards, 15th in carries, and 11th in rushing touchdowns; Foreman now ranks in the top 75 (as of 2023) in touchdowns. Chuck Foreman was in consideration for the Pro Football Hall of Fame's Class of 2025 under the seniors category making it to the final 31 players alongside another former Minnesota Viking, Jim Marshall.

== Personal life ==
Foreman's son Jay Foreman played linebacker in the NFL from 1999 to 2006. He is a substitute teacher in Minnesota at Bloomington Kennedy High School and Valley View Middle School in Bloomington, Minnesota. Foreman has also established Sound Advice For Life, a student development program with the goal of providing positive reinforcement and guidelines for a productive life.

== NFL career statistics ==
Year	Team	GP	Rushing				Receiving			Fum
Year	Team	GP	Att	Yds	TD	Y/G	Rec	Yds	TD	Fum
1973	MIN	12	182	801	4	66.8	37	362	2	6
1974	MIN	13	199	777	9	59.8	53	586	6	6
1975	MIN	14	280	1,070	13	76.4	73	691	9	12
1976	MIN	14	278	1,155	13	82.5	55	567	1	7
1977	MIN	14	270	1,112	6	79.4	38	308	3	9
1978	MIN	14	237	749	5	53.5	61	396	2	8
1979	MIN	12	87	223	2	18.6	19	147	0	4
1980	NE	16	23	63	1	3.9	14	99	0	0
Career		109	1,556	5,950	53	54.6	350	3,156	23	52

=== NFL records ===
- Most receiving touchdowns by a 10 touchdown rusher, season: 9 (tied with Marshall Faulk)
- Most games with a rushing and receiving touchdown, season: 5

=== Minnesota Vikings Franchise Records ===
- Most total touchdowns, season: 22
- Most receiving touchdowns by a running back, season: 9 (tied with Bill Brown)
- Most consecutive seasons with at least 1 receiving and 1 rushing touchdown: 6 (tied with Ted Brown)
- Playoff rushes, career: 229
- Playoff rushing yards, career: 860
- Playoff rushing touchdowns, career: 7
