= Charlie Sanders =

American football player (1946–2015)

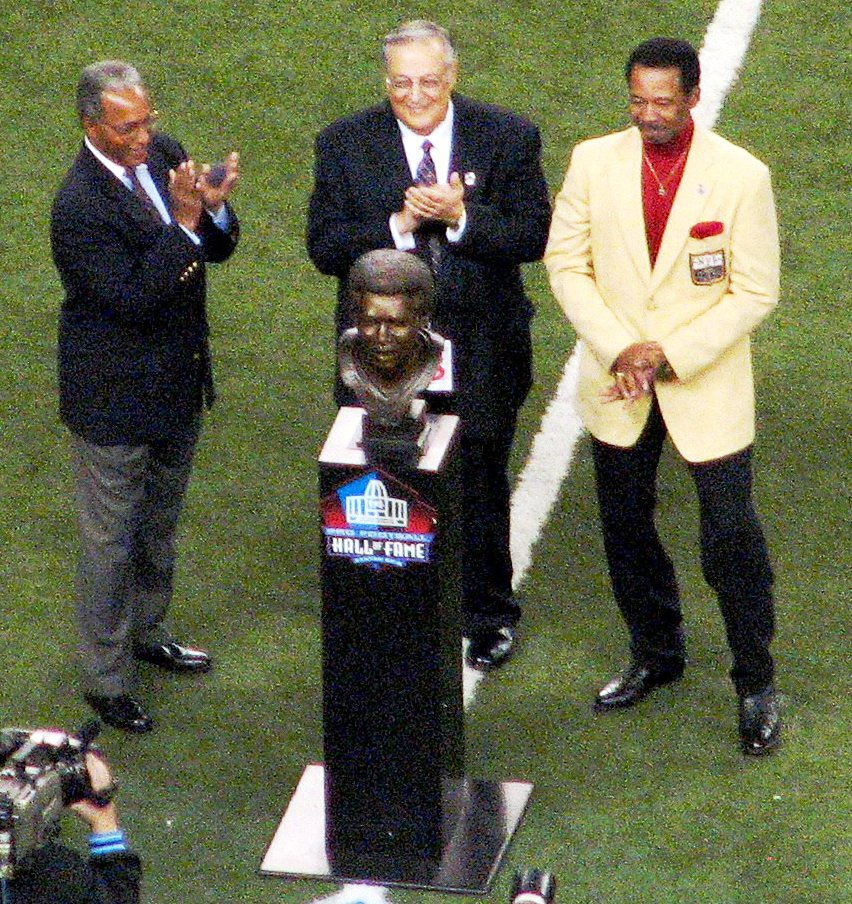
- Sanders (far right) at his Pro Football Hall of Fame Bust Unveiling Ceremony at Ford Field in 2007

No. 88
- Position: Tight end

Personal information
- Born: August 25, 1946; Richlands, North Carolina, U.S.
- Died: July 2, 2015 (aged 68); Royal Oak, Michigan, U.S.
- Listed height: 6 ft 4 in (1.93 m)
- Listed weight: 225 lb (102 kg)

Career information
- High school: James B. Dudley (Greensboro, North Carolina)
- College: Minnesota (1965–1967)
- NFL draft: 1968: 3rd round, 74th overall pick

Career history
- Detroit Lions (1968–1977)

Awards and highlights
- 3× First-team All-Pro (1969–1971); 7× Pro Bowl (1968–1971, 1974–1976); NFL 1970s All-Decade Team; Pride of the Lions; Detroit Lions 75th Anniversary Team; Detroit Lions All-Time Team; Second-team All-Big Ten (1967)

Career NFL statistics
- Receptions: 336
- Receiving yards: 4,817
- Receiving touchdowns: 31
- Stats at Pro Football Reference
- Pro Football Hall of Fame

Charles Alvin Sanders (August 25, 1946 – July 2, 2015) was an American professional football player who was a tight end for the Detroit Lions of the National Football League (NFL) from 1968 to 1977. Sanders was chosen for the NFL's 1970s All-Decade Team and voted into the Pro Football Hall of Fame in 2007.

== Early life ==
Sanders was born in 1946 in Richlands, North Carolina. He attended James B. Dudley High School in Greensboro, North Carolina, where he played for the football, basketball, and baseball teams.

== College career ==
Sanders attended the University of Minnesota, where he played college football for the Golden Gophers. He was named to the All-Big Ten Conference Team in his senior year, when he recorded 21 receptions for 276 yards with two touchdowns, as Minnesota tied for the Big Ten championship with an 8–2 record.

== Professional career ==
The Detroit Lions selected Sanders in the third round of the 1968 NFL draft, 74th overall. He became their starting tight end for the next ten seasons. He had 336 career receptions for 4,817 yards and 31 touchdowns. He was also known as a superior blocker. Sanders was chosen for the Pro Bowl seven times (1968–71, 1974–76). He was the only rookie to be named to the 1969 Pro Bowl, following a season where he had forty receptions for 533 yards. Sanders was also selected as a first-team All-Pro for the 1970 and 1971 seasons, receiving the most votes of any player in both years. During an exhibition game in 1976, he injured his right knee, but continued to play until his retirement at age 31 in November 1977.

Sanders was named to the NFL 1970s All-Decade Team as selected by voters of the Pro Football Hall of Fame. He was inducted into the North Carolina Sports Hall of Fame in 1997, and the Minnesota M Club Hall of Fame in 2013. In 2008, Sanders was chosen as a member of the Lions' 75th Anniversary All Time Team.

== NFL career statistics ==
Legend
**Bold**	Career high

Year	Team	Games		Receiving				
Year	Team	GP	GS	Rec	Yds	Avg	Lng	TD
1968	DET	14	14	40	533	13.3	25	1
1969	DET	14	14	**42**	**656**	15.6	47	3
1970	DET	14	14	40	544	13.6	34	**6**
1971	DET	13	13	31	502	**16.2**	49	5
1972	DET	9	8	27	416	15.4	38	2
1973	DET	14	14	28	433	15.5	**54**	2
1974	DET	14	14	**42**	532	12.7	47	3
1975	DET	13	12	37	486	13.1	32	3
1976	DET	13	13	35	545	15.6	36	5
1977	DET	10	6	14	170	12.1	24	1
		128	122	336	4,817	14.3	54	31

== Later life ==
Sanders served as a color analyst on Lions radio broadcasts from 1983 through 1988, worked with the team as an assistant coach in charge of wide receivers from 1989 to 1996, returned to perform radio broadcasts in 1997, and then joined the Lions' front office as a scout. He became the team's assistant director of pro personnel in 2000, and held the role until his death. In 2005, he co-authored Charlie Sanders' Tales from the Detroit Lions, a book of anecdotes about the team and its players.

Sanders also worked in the team's community relations department and served as a spokesman for the United Way and The March of Dimes. He created The Charlie Sanders Foundation in 2007, which provided two college scholarships per year for students from Oakland County, Monroe, Michigan, and his home state of North Carolina. In 2012, he began the "Have A Heart Save A Life" program (within the foundation) to raise funds to provide heart (EKG) screenings to young people. In August 2012, the first "Charlie Sanders Have A Heart Save A Life Celebrity Golf Outing was held in West Bloomfield, Michigan. St. Jude Children's Research Hospital honored Sanders for his charitable work in 2014.

== Personal life and death ==
Sanders and his wife, Georgianna, had nine children and lived in Rochester Hills, Michigan. Charlie has nine children Mia, Charese, Mary Jo, Georgianna Jr., Charlie Jr., Nathalie, Talissa, Wayne and Jordan. One of his daughters, Mary Jo is a pro boxer, and three of his sons played college football: Charlie Sanders Jr. at Ohio State University and had a brief NFL career with the Detroit Lions; one son formerly played at Saginaw Valley State University; and one son is currently playing at Saginaw Valley State University, after transferring from Michigan State University.

Sanders developed a malignant tumor behind his right knee, which was discovered while he was undergoing knee replacement surgery. Sanders underwent chemotherapy, but died on July 2, 2015, in Royal Oak, Michigan, from cancer.
