= Lynn Boden =

American football player (born 1953)

No. 62, 60
- Position: Guard/Tackle

Personal information
- Born: June 5, 1953 (age 73); Stromsburg, Nebraska, U.S
- Listed height: 6 ft 3 in (1.91 m)
- Listed weight: 270 lb (122 kg)

Career information
- High school: Osceola
- College: South Dakota State
- NFL draft: 1975: 1st round, 13th overall pick

Career history
- Detroit Lions (1975–1978); Chicago Bears (1979)

Awards and highlights
- PFWA All-Rookie Team (1975)

Career NFL statistics
- Games played: 67
- Games started: 49
- Fumble recoveries: 1
- Stats at Pro Football Reference

Lynn Ray Boden (born June 5, 1953) is an American former professional football player who was an offensive guard for five seasons in the National Football League (NFL) with the Detroit Lions (1975–1978) and the Chicago Bears (1979). He played college football at South Dakota State University. He was selected in the first round of the 1975 NFL draft with the 13th overall pick by Detroit.
