= Billy Howard (gridiron football) =

American football player (1950–2005)

No. 70, 73
- Position: Defensive end / Defensive tackle

Personal information
- Born: July 17, 1950; Clarksdale, Mississippi, U.S.
- Died: February 13, 2005 (aged 54); Grand Prairie, Texas, U.S.
- Listed height: 6 ft 4 in (1.93 m)
- Listed weight: 252 lb (114 kg)

Career information
- High school: Coahoma Agricultural (Clarksdale)
- College: Alcorn State
- NFL draft: 1974: 2nd round, 39th overall pick

Career history
- Detroit Lions (1974–1976); Atlanta Falcons (1977)*; Winnipeg Blue Bombers (1977–1979)
- * Offseason or practice squad member only

Career NFL statistics
- Sacks: 6
- Fumble recoveries: 1
- Stats at Pro Football Reference

Billy Howard Sr. (July 17, 1950 – February 13, 2005) was an American professional football defensive lineman who played three seasons with the Detroit Lions of the National Football League (NFL). He was selected by the Lions in the second round of the 1974 NFL draft after playing college football at Alcorn State University. Howard also played for the Winnipeg Blue Bombers of the Canadian Football League (CFL).

== Early life and college ==
Billy Howard was born on July 17, 1950, in Clarksdale, Mississippi. He attended Coahoma Agricultural High School in Clarksdale.

Howard was a four-year letterman for the Alcorn State Braves of Alcorn State University from 1970 to 1973.

== Professional career ==
Howard was selected by the Detroit Lions in the second round, with the 39th overall pick, of the 1974 NFL draft. He officially signed with the team on June 8, 1974. He played in 12 games for the Lions during the 1974 season and posted one sack. Howard appeared in 13 games, starting 12, in 1975, recording four sacks and one fumble recovery. The Lions finished the 1975 season with a 7–7 record. He played in 13 games for the second straight year, starting seven, in 1976 and made one sack. Howard was released by the Lions on June 4, 1977, after failing a physical.

Howard signed with the Atlanta Falcons in 1977. However, he was later released on August 30, 1977.

Howard was then signed by the Winnipeg Blue Bombers of the Canadian Football League (CFL). He dressed in four games for the Blue Bombers during the 1977 CFL season. He dressed in 12 games in 1978. Howard dressed in all 16 games for Winnipeg in 1979 as the team finished 4–12.

== Personal life ==
Howard was a control operator for the city of Fort Worth, Texas. He died on February 13, 2005, in Grand Prairie, Texas, at the age of 54.
