= Lawrence Gaines =

American football player (born 1953)

No. 38
- Position: Running back

Personal information
- Born: December 15, 1953 (age 72); Vernon, Texas, U.S.
- Listed height: 6 ft 1 in (1.85 m)
- Listed weight: 237 lb (108 kg)

Career information
- High school: Vernon (TX)
- College: Wyoming
- NFL draft: 1976: 1st round, 16th overall pick

Career history
- Detroit Lions (1976–1979)

Career NFL statistics
- Rushing attempts: 232
- Rushing yards: 892
- Rushing TDs: 5
- Stats at Pro Football Reference

Lawrence Edward Gaines (born December 15, 1953) is an American former professional football player who was a running back in the National Football League (NFL). He was selected by the Detroit Lions 16th overall in the first round of the 1976 NFL draft. He played college football for the Wyoming Cowboys.
