= Ollie Smith (American football) =

American football player (born 1949)

No. 80, 89
- Position: Wide receiver

Personal information
- Born: March 8, 1949 (age 77); Jackson, Mississippi, U.S.
- Died: December 8, 2021; Jackson, Mississippi, U.S.
- Listed height: 6 ft 3 in (1.91 m)
- Listed weight: 203 lb (92 kg)

Career information
- High school: Jackson (MS) Brinkley
- College: Tennessee State
- NFL draft: 1973: 4th round, 85th overall pick

Career history
- Baltimore Colts (1973–1974); Green Bay Packers (1976–1977)

Career NFL statistics
- Receptions: 44
- Receiving yards: 772
- Touchdowns: 1
- Kick returns: 1
- Return yards: 12
- Stats at Pro Football Reference

Ollie Smith (born March 8, 1949) is an American former wide receiver in the National Football League (NFL). He was selected in the fourth round of the 1973 NFL draft by the Baltimore Colts and played two seasons with the team. After a year away from the NFL, he played two seasons with the Green Bay Packers.
