= Nate Allen (cornerback) =

American football player (born 1948)

No. 48, 27, 25, 42
- Position: Cornerback

Personal information
- Born: May 13, 1948 (age 78); Georgetown, South Carolina, U.S.
- Listed height: 5 ft 10 in (1.78 m)
- Listed weight: 170 lb (77 kg)

Career information
- High school: Georgetown
- College: Texas Southern
- NFL draft: 1971: 11th round, 276th overall pick

Career history
- Kansas City Chiefs (1971–1974); San Francisco 49ers (1975); Minnesota Vikings (1976–1979); Detroit Lions (1979)

Career NFL statistics
- Games played: 108
- Interceptions: 9
- Touchdowns: 1
- Stats at Pro Football Reference

Nathaniel Sheraldton Allen (born May 13, 1948) is an American former professional football player who was a cornerback for nine seasons in the National Football League (NFL).

He played college football for the Texas Southern Tigers.
