= Bobby Thompson (running back) =

American football player and executive (born 1947)

No. 33
- Position: Running back

Personal information
- Born: January 16, 1947 (age 79); Raleigh, North Carolina, U.S.
- Listed height: 5 ft 11 in (1.80 m)
- Listed weight: 195 lb (88 kg)

Career information
- High school: Central (Providence, Rhode Island)
- College: Oklahoma
- NFL draft: 1969: undrafted

Career history
- Saskatchewan Roughriders (1969–1974); Detroit Lions (1975–1976); Saskatchewan Roughriders (1977)
- Stats at Pro Football Reference

Bobby Thompson (born January 16, 1947) is an American football executive and former running back. An alumnus of the University of Oklahoma, Thompson played two seasons in the National Football League (NFL) for the Detroit Lions and, before that, in the Canadian Football League (CFL) for the Saskatchewan Roughriders.

Thompson served as an executive with the Stars Football League (SFL), a league founded and managed by his former agent, Peter Hulthwaite, throughout that league's existence.
