= Bert Askson =

American football player (1945–2026)

No. 76, 89, 88
- Positions: Defensive end, tight end

Personal information
- Born: December 16, 1945; Houston, Texas, U.S.
- Died: July 24, 2026 (aged 80)
- Listed height: 6 ft 3 in (1.91 m)
- Listed weight: 223 lb (101 kg)

Career information
- High school: Kashmere (Houston)
- College: Texas Southern
- NFL draft: 1970: 14th round, 340th overall pick

Career history
- Pittsburgh Steelers (1970–1971); New Orleans Saints (1973); Green Bay Packers (1975–1977)

Career NFL statistics
- Receptions: 5
- Receiving yards: 78
- Receiving TDs: 1
- Stats at Pro Football Reference

Bert H. Askson (December 16, 1945 – July 24, 2026) was an American professional football player who was a tight end and defensive end in the National Football League (NFL) for the Pittsburgh Steelers, New Orleans Saints, and Green Bay Packers. He played college football for the Texas Southern Tigers and was selected by the Steelers in the 14th round of the 1970 NFL draft. Askson played in the NFL from 1971 to 1977, most notably with the Packers from 1975 to 1977, playing in 42 games over three seasons. Askson died on July 24, 2026, at the age of 80.
