= Steve Odom =

American football player (born 1952)

No. 84
- Positions: Wide receiver, kick returner

Personal information
- Born: September 5, 1952 (age 74); Oakland, California, U.S.
- Listed height: 5 ft 8 in (1.73 m)
- Listed weight: 173 lb (78 kg)

Career information
- High school: Berkeley (CA)
- College: Utah
- NFL draft: 1974: 5th round, 116th overall pick

Career history
- Green Bay Packers (1974–1979); New York Giants (1979)

Awards and highlights
- Pro Bowl (1975); First-team All-American (1973)

Career NFL statistics
- Receptions: 84
- Receiving yards: 1,613
- Total TDs: 15
- Stats at Pro Football Reference

Stephen Odom (born September 5, 1952) is an American former professional football player who was a wide receiver and kick returner in the National Football League (NFL). He played college football for the Utah Utes, twice finishing second in the country in receiving touchdowns with 11 his sophomore and 8 his junior year, and led the nation in kickoff returns in 1972. He was a first-team All-American (as a return specialist) and Academic All-American in 1973. At the time of graduation, he held records for touchdowns (26), receiving yards in a game (177 vs Arizona St in 1972), receiving touchdowns in a season (11 in 1972) and career (19), longest kickoff return (93 yards vs Texas Tech in 1973), most career punt return yards (548), longest punt return (95 yards vs UTEP in 1973), most career kickoff returns (99) and yards (2,582), and most yards per catch in a season (22.1 in 1972; these last four records still stand). Odom was drafted by the Green Bay Packers in the fifth round of the 1974 draft, where he played five seasons, and one with the New York Giants (1979). He went to the Pro Bowl after the 1974 season. He had both a punt and a kick return of 95 yards for a touchdown during his time with the Packers.

Odom has held at least 4 Packers franchise records, including:

- Most Kick Returns (career): 179
- Most Kick Ret Yds (career): 4,124
- Most Total Return Yds (career): 4,693
- Longest punt return for a touchdown: 95 yards (CHI 1974, Week 9).

== See also ==
- List of NCAA major college yearly punt and kickoff return leaders
