= Ken Payne =

American football player (1950–2011)

No. 85, 80, 82
- Position: Wide receiver

Personal information
- Born: October 6, 1950; Oklahoma City, Oklahoma, U.S.
- Died: August 1, 2011 (aged 60); Oklahoma City, Oklahoma, U.S.
- Listed height: 6 ft 1 in (1.85 m)
- Listed weight: 185 lb (84 kg)

Career information
- College: Langston
- NFL draft: 1974: 6th round, 142nd overall pick

Career history
- Green Bay Packers (1974–1977); Philadelphia Eagles (1978)

Career NFL statistics
- Receptions: 116
- Receiving yards: 1,633
- Touchdowns: 6
- Stats at Pro Football Reference

Ken Payne (October 6, 1950 – August 1, 2011) was an American professional football wide receiver in the National Football League (NFL). He sprinted and played college football at Langston, helping the team to an 11-0 record and the 1973 NAIA playoffs. He was the fourth player drafted from the small college when the Green Bay Packers selected him in the sixth round of the 1974 NFL draft. He was used sparingly during his rookie season, but in Week 2 of 1975 he had 167 receiving yards on a then-franchise-record 12 receptions. The record was tied, but not broken until 2016 by Davante Adams. He led the Packers in receptions and receiving yards for the next two seasons. However, he was cut by the Packers after just four games in 1977. The Philadelphia Eagles claimed him off waivers on October 17, but he had an emergency appendectomy just two days later and missed the rest of the season. He had just 13 receptions the next season, the last of his career. He lived the rest of his live in Oklahoma City, had eight children, and worked as a church bus driver until his death in 2011.
