= Ray Jarvis (American football) =

American football player (1949–2026)

- Jarvis in 1972

No. 46, 80, 45, 87
- Position: Wide receiver

Personal information
- Born: February 2, 1949; Chesapeake, Virginia, U.S.
- Died: August 3, 2026 (aged 77); Waukesha, Wisconsin, U.S.
- Listed height: 6 ft 0 in (1.83 m)
- Listed weight: 200 lb (91 kg)

Career information
- College: Norfolk State
- NFL draft: 1971: 5th round, 111th overall pick

Career history
- Atlanta Falcons (1971–1972); Buffalo Bills (1973); Detroit Lions (1974–1978); New England Patriots (1979)

Career NFL statistics
- Games played: 82
- Starts: 39
- Receiving yards: 1,832 (17.6 average)
- Touchdowns: 11
- Stats at Pro Football Reference

Leon Raeminton "Ray" Jarvis (February 2, 1949 – August 3, 2026) was an American professional football player who was a wide receiver in the National Football League (NFL). He played college football for the Norfolk State Spartans and was selected in the fifth round of the 1971 NFL draft. Jarvis played in the NFL for the Atlanta Falcons, Buffalo Bills, Detroit Lions, and New England Patriots.

Jarvis died in Waukesha, Wisconsin on August 3, 2026, at the age of 77.
