= Errol Mann =

American football player (1941–2013)

No. 39, 12, 14
- Position: Placekicker

Personal information
- Born: June 27, 1941; Campbell, Minnesota, U.S.
- Died: April 11, 2013 (aged 71); Missoula, Montana, U.S.
- Listed height: 6 ft 0 in (1.83 m)
- Listed weight: 200 lb (91 kg)

Career information
- High school: Campbell (MN)
- College: North Dakota
- NFL draft: 1967: undrafted

Career history
- Denver Broncos (1967)*; Cleveland Browns (1968)*; Green Bay Packers (1968); Detroit Lions (1969–1976); Oakland Raiders (1976–1978)
- * Offseason or practice squad member only

Awards and highlights
- Super Bowl champion (XI); Second-team All-Pro (1977); NFL scoring leader (1977)

Career NFL statistics
- Field goals: 177/276
- Field goal %: 64.1
- Longest field goal: 52
- Stats at Pro Football Reference

Errol Denis Mann (June 27, 1941 – April 11, 2013) was an American football placekicker. He played in the National Football League (NFL) from 1968 to 1978, and was a member of the Oakland Raiders' Super Bowl XI winning team. When attempting kicks, Mann used the straight-on style, which was the standard method at the time. This style of kicking later fell into disuse with the advent of soccer/association football-style place-kicking in the 1970s. The straight-on method is almost never used by American football placekickers now.

== Professional career ==
Born in Campbell, Minnesota, Mann began his career by playing for teams located in the Upper Midwest such as the Green Bay Packers before transferring to the Detroit Lions in the next year. In 1970, Mann led the NFL in extra points attempted and extra points scored, being a perfect 41 out of 41 on extra points. In 1976, he played for both the Lions and the Oakland Raiders, but made only 8 of 22 field goals in the regular season. When the Raiders appeared in Super Bowl XI, Mann made two field goals, including one from 40 yards, to help the Raiders become Super Bowl Champions for the first time in the history of their franchise. However, he also missed a 29-yard field goal and two extra point attempts. The following season, 1977, was arguably the best season of his career, leading the NFL in extra points attempted with 42, extra points made with 39 and he also led the NFL in points scored with 99. Mann left the NFL after playing for the Raiders in the 1978 season.

== NFL career statistics ==
Legend
	Won the Super Bowl
**Bold**	Career high

=== Regular season ===
Year	Team	GP	Overall FGs				PATs			Points
Year	Team	GP	Lng	FGM	FGA	Pct	XPM	XPA	Pct	Points
1968	GB	2	—	0	3	0.0	4	4	**100.0**	4
1969	DET	14	50	**25**	**37**	67.6	26	26	**100.0**	101
1970	DET	14	51	20	29	69.0	**41**	41	**100.0**	101
1971	DET	14	49	22	**37**	59.5	37	37	**100.0**	**103**
1972	DET	14	51	20	29	69.0	38	39	97.4	98
1973	DET	8	**52**	13	19	68.4	14	14	**100.0**	53
1974	DET	14	42	23	32	**71.9**	23	26	88.5	92
1975	DET	14	47	14	21	66.7	25	29	86.2	67
1976	DET	6	49	4	10	40.0	9	10	90.0	21
1976	OAK	7	42	4	11	36.4	26	27	96.3	38
1977	OAK	14	42	20	28	71.4	39	**42**	92.9	99
1978	OAK	**16**	45	12	20	60.0	33	38	86.8	69
Career		137	52	177	276	64.1	315	333	94.6	846

=== Postseason ===
Year	Team	GP	Overall FGs				PATs			Points
Year	Team	GP	Lng	FGM	FGA	Pct	XPM	XPA	Pct	Points
1970	DET	1	—	—	—	—	—	—	—	0
1976	OAK	**3**	**40**	**4**	**5**	**80.0**	**8**	**10**	80.0	**20**
1977	OAK	2	22	2	4	50.0	6	6	**100.0**	12
Career		6	40	6	9	66.7	14	16	87.5	32
