= List of schools of the Roman Catholic Diocese of San Diego =

This is a list of schools of the Roman Catholic Diocese of San Diego.

== K-12 schools ==
- St. Joseph Academy

== High schools ==
- Academy of Our Lady of Peace
- Cathedral Catholic High School
- Cristo Rey San Diego High School
- Mater Dei Catholic High School
- St. Augustine High School
- Vincent Memorial Catholic High School

== K-8 and elementary schools ==
- All Hallows Academy
- Good Shepherd Catholic School
- Holy Trinity School
- Mater Dei Juan Diego Academy
- Nativity Prep Academy
- Nazareth School, San Diego
- Notre Dame Academy
- Our Lady of Grace School
- Our Lady of Guadalupe Academy
- Our Lady of Mount Carmel School
- Our Lady’s School
- Sacred Heart Parish School
- Sacred Heart School, Brawley
- Saint John School
- Saint Mary, Star of the Sea Catholic School
- Santa Sophia Academy
- School of the Madeleine
- St. Charles Borromeo Academy
- St. Charles Catholic School
- St. Columba Catholic School
- St. Didacus Parish School
- St. Francis of Assisi
- St. Gregory the Great Catholic School
- St. James Academy
- St. John of the Cross Catholic School
- St. Katharine Drexel Academy
- St. Kieran Catholic School
- St. Martin of Tours Academy
- St. Mary School, Escondido
- St. Mary’s Catholic School
- St. Michael’s School
- St. Patrick Catholic School, Carlsbad
- St. Patrick School
- St. Peter the Apostle Catholic School
- St. Pius X School
- St. Rita’s School
- St. Rose of Lima School
- St. Therese Academy
- St. Vincent de Paul School
- Stella Maris Academy
- The Nativity School

== Former schools ==
- St. Michael Academy, closed in 2021.
- Sacred Heart School (Brawley) - Opened in 1914 and closed in 2021. It was privately operated.

Former schools of predecessor dioceses

- St. Anthony's Industrial School - An American Indian school (of the Roman Catholic Diocese of Monterey-Los Angeles)
  - It opened in 1886. Sisters of St. Joseph of Carondelet provided the teaching staff. It closed in 1907, with students sent to St. Boniface Industrial School.
