= Peanuts (TV series) =

2014-2016 animated television series

- Promotional poster
- Also known as: Peanuts by Schulz
- Genre: Children's television series Comedy
- Based on: Peanuts by Charles M. Schulz
- Developed by: Alexis Lavillat
- Written by: Nicolas Gallet; Olivier Jean-Marie
- Directed by: Alexis Lavillat
- Voices of: Shola Adisa-Farrar; Kaycie Chase; Tiffany Hofstetter; Sharon Mann Vallet; Emma Scherer; Barbara Weber-Scaff
- Composer: Féloche
- Countries of origin: France; Italy; United States
- Original languages: English; Italian; French
- No. of seasons: 1
- No. of episodes: 37 (104 segments)

Production
- Executive producer: Damién Levy
- Producer: Alexis Lavillat
- Editor: David Sauve
- Running time: 7 minutes
- Production companies: Peanuts Worldwide; Normaal Animation; Dall'Angelo Pictures

Original release
- Network: France 3
- Release: November 9, 2014 – December 24, 2016
- Network: Cartoon Network; Boomerang
- Release: May 9 – December 24, 2016

Peanuts by Schulz is a children's animated television series adapted for the screen and directed by Alexis Lavillat. It is based on the comic strip of the same name created by Charles M. Schulz. The series first aired in France on November 9, 2014, and later began airing in the United States on Cartoon Network and Boomerang on May 9, 2016, as interstitial shorts. As of 2021, it is available on Amazon Prime Video.

The series airs on Rai Gulp in Italy and on France 3 in France.

== Cast and characters ==
=== English voice cast ===
- Aiden Lewandowski as Charlie Brown
- Emma Yarovinsky as Sally Brown
- Bella Stine as Lucy Van Pelt / Crybaby Boobie / Peggy Jean
- Jude Perry as Linus Van Pelt
- Cassidy May Benullo as Frieda / Eudora / Lydia
- Caleel Harris as Franklin
- Lily Zager as Patricia "Peppermint Patty" Reichardt / Molley Volley
- Finn Carr as Rerun van Pelt
- Taylor Autumn Bertman as Marcie / Sally Brown
- Sage Correa as Pig-Pen
- Daniel Thornton as Schroeder / Snoopy

=== France-based English voice cast ===
- Barbara Weber-Scaff as Charlie Brown / Peppermint Patty /Snoopy/ Molley Volley
- Kaycie Chase as Linus Van Pelt / Sally Brown / Woodstock / Rerun Van Pelt. Chase previously voiced Charlie Brown in the French dub of the specials.
- Tiffany Hofstetter as Lucy Van Pelt
- Emma Scherer as Frieda / Marcie
- Shola Adisa-Farrar as Franklin / Pig-Pen
- Sharon Mann as Schroeder / Floyd
- Ann Christine as Lydia
- Robert Brazil

=== French voice cast ===
- Kaycie Chase - Linus Van Pelt / Sally Brown / Woodstock
- Mathilde Hennekinne
- Nathalie Homs
- Caroline Pascal
- Dorothée Pousséo
- Magali Rosenzweig
- Barbara Weber-Scaff

== Episodes ==
No.	Title	Written by	Original release date	U.S. viewers (millions)
1a	"Come On, Snoopy!"	Nicolas Gallet	May 9, 2016	0.09 (Boomerang); 0.63 (Cartoon Network)
Sally brings Snoopy in for show and tell; Lucy helps Snoopy conquer his fear of the dark; Lucy hates the world; Snoopy is unappreciative; Snoopy interferes with Charlie Brown's television time. DVD Release: Peanuts by Schulz: Snoopy Tales
1b	"Don't Worry, Charlie Brown"	Olivier Jean-Marie	May 9, 2016	0.09 (Boomerang); 0.63 (Cartoon Network)
Charlie Brown needs to be rescued from the kite-eating tree. DVD Release: Peanuts by Schulz: Go Team Go!
1c	"The Little Red Haired Girl"	Unknown	May 10, 2016	0.08 (Boomerang)
Charlie Brown does not flirt very well. DVD Release: Peanuts by Schulz: It's Only Love
2a	"Have a Nice Day, Linus"	May 10, 2016	0.08 (Boomerang)	
Lucy tries to convince Linus to give up his blanket; Linus and Snoopy get slivers; Linus is excited about Miss Othmar's return; Sally tries to woo Linus at lunch. DVD Release: Peanuts by Schulz: It's Only Love
2b	"Good Sports"	Olivier Jean-Marie	May 11, 2016	0.06 (Boomerang); 0.61 (Cartoon Network)
Peppermint Patty gives a report on summer; Marcie makes baseball caps; Charlie Brown is upset over his team's fly balls; Peppermint Patty helps Marcie with tackling; Linus tries to teach Sally to play football. DVD Release: Peanuts by Schulz: Go Team Go!
2c	"Sound and Sensibility"	Nicolas Gallet	May 11, 2016	0.06 (Boomerang); 0.61 (Cartoon Network)
Lucy sings about money at her psychiatric booth. DVD Releases: Peanuts by Schulz: Snoopy Tales & Peanuts by Schulz: It's Only Love
3a	"Frieda"	May 12, 2016	0.07 (Boomerang)	
Linus gets to meet Frieda and Frieda helps Snoopy find rabbits to chase. DVD Release: Peanuts by Schulz: School Days
3b	"Mysteries of Love"	May 12, 2016	0.07 (Boomerang)	
Peppermint Patty wants Charlie Brown to teach her about love; Lucy tells Schroeder that flowers mean true love; Lucy imagines married life with Schroeder. DVD Release: Peanuts by Schulz: It's Only Love
3c	"Technical Difficulties"	May 13, 2016	0.09 (Boomerang)	
Sally Brown learns to draw circles. DVD Release: Peanuts by Schulz: School Days
4a	"A Day with Snoopy"	Nicolas Gallet	May 13, 2016	0.09 (Boomerang)
Charlie Brown feeds Snoopy dinner; Snoopy begs for candy; Snoopy supports National Dog Week; Snoopy does the happy dance; Snoopy wants to sleep inside to avoid rain. DVD Releases: Peanuts by Schulz: Snoopy Tales & Peanuts by Schulz: Springtime
4b	"A Strong Personality"	May 16, 2016	0.50 (Cartoon Network)	
Lucy thinks Beethoven should have been married; Linus wants Lucy to share her umbrella. DVD Release: (As of 2021, this episode has yet to be released on DVD)
4c	"The Eye of the Beholder"	May 17, 2016	N/A	
Peppermint Patty watches a beauty contest. DVD Release: Peanuts by Schulz: School Days
5a	"Miss Othmar"	May 18, 2016	N/A	
Linus is curious about whether Miss Othmar likes him or not. DVD Releases: Peanuts by Schulz: School Days & Peanuts by Schulz: It's Only Love
5b	"The School of Hard Knocks"	May 19, 2016	N/A	
Peppermint Patty wants to attend a private school and Snoopy suggests an obedience school. DVD Release: Peanuts by Schulz: School Days
5c	"My Blanket!"	Nicolas Gallet	May 20, 2016	0.05 (Boomerang)
Snoopy and Linus struggle over a blanket. DVD Release: Peanuts by Schulz: Snoopy Tales
6a	"Novel Idea"	May 23, 2016	N/A	
Linus reviews Snoopy's story, DVD Release: Peanuts by Schulz: School Days
6b	"No Strings Attached"	Olivier Jean-Marie	May 24, 2016	N/A
Lucy gives Charlie Brown's kite to Snoopy when he is not able to fly it. DVD Releases: Peanuts by Schulz: Go Team Go! & DVD Releases: Peanuts by Schulz: Springtime
6c	"A Friend Indeed"	May 25, 2016	N/A	
Charlie Brown accidentally falls asleep reading Snoopy a bedtime story. DVD Release: Peanuts by Schulz: School Days
7a	"Crazy Mutt"	Nicolas Gallet	May 26, 2016	N/A
Linus teaches Snoopy how to play catch; Charlie Brown helps Snoopy practice his diving skills; Snoopy and Lucy brawl. DVD Releases: Peanuts by Schulz: Snoopy Tales & Peanuts by Schulz: Springtime
7b	"Doing It Right"	Olivier Jean-Marie	May 27, 2016	0.14
Charlie Brown gives advice on life. DVD Releases: Peanuts by Schulz: Go Team Go! & Peanuts by Schulz: Sringtime
7c	"Like Skates on Ice"	Olivier Jean-Marie	May 30, 2016	0.27
Peppermint Patty gets skating lessons. DVD Releases: Peanuts by Schulz: Go Team Go! & Peanuts by Schulz: Happy Holidays
8a	"Tennis"	Olivier Jean-Marie	May 31, 2016	N/A
Snoopy meets his tennis partner, Molly Volley. DVD Release: Peanuts by Schulz: Go Team Go!
8b	"A Little Nap"	June 1, 2016	N/A	
Snoopy interrupts Linus's nap; Sally and Peppermint Patty can barely stay awake. DVD Release: Peanuts by Schulz: School Days
8c	"Word of Mouth"	Nicolas Gallet	June 2, 2016	N/A
Snoopy gets rid of his bowl when he finds cat food in it. DVD Release: Peanuts by Schulz: Snoopy Tales
9a	"Good Dog"	Nicolas Gallet	June 3, 2016	N/A
Lucy watches Snoopy for Charlie Brown. DVD Releases: Peanuts by Schulz: Snoopy Tales & Peanuts by Schulz: Happy Holidays
9b	"Snoopy the Superstar"	Olivier Jean-Marie	June 6, 2016	N/A
Snoopy becomes a lawyer and defends a rabbit as his client. DVD Release: Peanuts by Schulz: Go Team Go!
9c	"Train Your Dog"	Nicolas Gallet	June 8, 2016	N/A
Snoopy tries to make his dinner more elegant. DVD Release: Peanuts by Schulz: Snoopy Tales
10a	"A Pretty Picture"	Olivier Jean-Marie	June 9, 2016	N/A
Snoopy paints Woodstock, who later organizes a concert for snowmen. Snoopy is the first beagle on the Moon. DVD Release: Peanuts by Schulz: Snoopy Tales
10b	"Leave Me in Peace"	June 10, 2016	N/A	
Snoopy and the Beagle Scouts sell tickets for a raffle. DVD Release: Peanuts by Schulz: School Days
10c	"Last of the Bunch"	June 13, 2016	N/A	
Lucy finds out that she has a new baby brother. DVD Releases: Peanuts by Schulz: School Days & Peanuts by Schulz: Springtime
11a	"Too Cold"	Olivier Jean-Marie	June 15, 2016	N/A
Snoopy and Charlie Brown write letters to Santa Claus. DVD Releases: Peanuts by Schulz: Snoopy Tales & Peanuts by Schulz: Happy Holidays
11b	"It's Raining, It's Pouring!"	June 16, 2016	N/A	
Snoopy tries to sleep inside when it rains. DVD Release: Peanuts by Schulz: School Days
11c	"Show Dog"	Nicolas Gallet	June 21, 2016	N/A
Snoopy and Lucy arm wrestle and box each other. DVD Release: Peanuts by Schulz: Go Team Go!
12a	"Philosophy"	June 28, 2016	N/A	
Lucy tells Charlie Brown to make his own philosophy. DVD Release: Peanuts by Schulz: Springtime
12b	"Woodstock"	Nicolas Gallet	June 30, 2016	N/A
Snoopy and Woodstock ask Charlie Brown about eating turkey. DVD Releases: Peanuts by Schulz: Snoopy Tales & Peanuts by Schulz: Happy Holidays
12c	"School Chums"	July 18, 2016	0.19	
Peppermint Patty is stuck on her back. DVD Release: Peanuts by Schulz: School Days
13a	"True or False"	July 19, 2016	0.14	
Peppermint Patty takes a true or false test. DVD Releases: Peanuts by Schulz: School Days & Peanuts by Schulz: Happy Holidays
13b	"Nobody Likes Me"	July 20, 2016	N/A	
Charlie Brown wants to be popular. DVD Release: Peanuts by Schulz: Lucy & Friends
13c	"Even-ing the Score"	Nicolas Gallet	July 21, 2016	N/A
Charlie Brown tries to help his baseball team get hit on the head less with fly balls; Lucy asks Charlie Brown what to say on the baseball field. DVD Releases: Peanuts by Schulz: Snoopy Tales & Peanuts by Schulz: Happy Holidays
14a	"Black and White"	Olivier Jean-Marie	July 22, 2016	N/A
Lucy has everyone sign a document to void her of blame. DVD Releases: Peanuts by Schulz: Go Team Go! & Peanuts by Schulz: Lucy & Friends
14b	"Beauty Contest"	July 25, 2016	0.19	
Peppermint Patty asks Charlie Brown if she is beautiful. DVD Releases: Peanuts by Schulz: School Days & Peanuts by Schulz: It's Only Love
14c	"A New Best Friend"	July 26, 2016	0.13	
Sally meets Eudora while they are both on their way to summer camp. DVD Release: Peanuts by Schulz: Lucy & Friends
15a	"Telling Stories"	Nicolas Galelet	July 27, 2016	0.16
Linus reads Snoopy's very complicated story. DVD Release: Peanuts by Schulz: Snoopy Tales
15b	"Being Nice"	July 28, 2016	0.15	
Charlie Brown helps Sally write a thank-you letter to Grandma. DVD Releases: Peanuts by Schulz: Springtime & Peanuts by Schulz: Happy Holidays
16a	"School Is Out!"	Nicolas Gallet	July 29, 2016	N/A
Sally decides to go to Hollywood instead of summer camp. DVD Releases: Peanuts by Schulz: Go Team Go! & Peanuts by Schulz: Springtime
16b	"Not Your Day"	August 1, 2016	0.14	
Lucy suggests whistling to cure Charlie Brown's sadness; Lucy wants to sulk in her beanbag chair; Sally's date with Linus does not go as planned. DVD Releases: Peanuts by Schulz: It's Only Love & Peanuts by Schulz: Lucy & Friends
16c	"A Little Love"	Nicolas Gallet	August 2, 2016	0.11
Charlie Brown waits for Valentine's cards. Charlie Brown makes his own Valentine's cards; Sally tries to free the tennis court for Linus; Sally pretends Linus takes her to the movies. DVD Releases: Peanuts by Schulz: Snoopy Tales & Peanuts by Schulz: It's Only Love & Peanuts by Schulz: Happy Holidays
17a	"Love is in the Air"	August 3, 2016	N/A	
Pig Pen takes Peppermint Patty to a dance; Sally is sad because Linus did mot send her a card; Marcie asks Charlie Brown out to a show. DVD Releases: Peanuts by Schulz: It's Only Love & Peanuts by Schulz: Happy Holidays
17b	"A Clean Sweep"	August 4, 2016	N/A	
Pig Pen defends being covered in dust; Pig Pen's dust takes over the movie theater; Pig Pen's dirt may have history; Charlie Brown questions Pig Pen's appearance for Lucy's birthday party. DVD Release: Peanuts by Schulz: Lucy & Friends
17c	"Brothers and Sisters"	August 5, 2016	N/A	
Lucy calls Linus stubborn; Lucy bothers Linus while watching TV; Linus explains his thumb rules; Lucy scrutinizes Linus's TV viewing; Lucy wants her beanbag from Linus. DVD Release: Peanuts by Schulz: Lucy & Friends
18a	"Marcie"	August 8, 2016	0.20	
Marcie documents Peppermint Patty's sleeping habits at school. Peppermint Patty says Marcie is crabby; Peppermint Patty questions her grade. DVD Release: Peanuts by Schulz: School Days
18b	"Good for Nothing"	Nicolas Gallet	August 9, 2016	N/A
Sally wants Charlie Brown to defend her. DVD Releases: Peanuts by Schulz: Snoopy Tales & Peanuts by Schulz: It's Only Love
18c	"Man's Best Friend"	Nicolas Gallet	August 10, 2016	N/A
Snoopy drags Linus along as he runs with his blanket. Linus asks Snoopy to keep his blanket and Snoopy subsequently makes it into a coat. DVD Releases: Peanuts by Schulz: Snoopy Tales & Peanuts by Schulz: Springtime
19a	"The Great Outdoors"	Olivier Jean-Marie	August 11, 2016	N/A
Lucy and Charlie Brown watch a puppet show by Snoopy; Woodstock helps Snoopy fish; Lucy and Sally meet a bug; Lucy watches Snoopy while Charlie Brown is away. DVD Release: Peanuts by Schulz: Go Team Go!
19b	"Off Key"	Nicolas Gallet	August 12, 2016	N/A
Snoopy interrupts Schroeder's piano playing; Peppermint Patty and Marcie attend a concert; Lucy breaks up with Schroeder. DVD Releases: Peanuts by Schulz: Snoopy Tales & Peanuts by Schulz: It's Only Love
20a	"Not My Day"	Nicolas Gallet	August 15, 2016	N/A
Lucy sets a record by being crabby for 100 days. DVD Releases: Peanuts by Schulz: Snoopy Tales & Peanuts by Schulz: Springtime & Peanuts by Schulz: Happy Holidays
20b	"It's Only Love"	August 16, 2016	N/A	
Charlie Brown wishes he could have lunch with the Little Red-Haired Girl. DVD Release: Peanuts by Schulz: It's Only Love
20c	"Best Friend"	August 17, 2016	N/A	
Peppermint Patty is upset she is not named Student of the Year; Marcie takes care of Peppermint Patty's sleeping head on her desk; Peppermint Patty thinks the teacher calls her ugly. DVD Release: Peanuts by Schulz: School Days
21a	"Strike Out"	Olivier Jean-Marie	August 18, 2016	N/A
Charlie Brown does not want to end a game due to bad weather. DVD Release: Peanuts by Schulz: Go Team Go!
22b	"Beware of the Dog"	Nicolas Gallet	August 19, 2016	N/A
Snoopy the fierce Vulture scares Linus; Snoopy and Woodstock are afraid of vampires; Snoopy disappears like the Cheshire Cat; Snoopy's brother Spike writes him a letter. DVD Release: Peanuts by Schulz: Snoopy Tales
22c	"Going My Way"	Nicolas Gallet	August 22, 2016	N/A
Snoopy battles with Linus over the blanket. DVD Release: Peanuts by Schulz: Snoopy Tales
23a	"The Call of the Wild"	Nicolas Gallet	August 23, 2016	N/A
The Beagle Scouts gather supplies to go on a hike. DVD Release: Peanuts by Schulz: Snoopy Tales
23b	"Security"	Nicolas Gallet	August 24, 2016	N/A
Lucy buries Linus's blanket. Linus cannot handle his blanket being gone. Snoopy finds Linus's blanket. Linus's blanket tries to attack Lucy; Lucy thinks Linus's blanket hates her. DVD Release: Peanuts by Schulz: Snoopy Tales & Peanuts by Schulz: Lucy & Friends
23c	"It's Just No Good"	August 25, 2016	N/A	
Sally brings her leaf collection for Show and Tell; Sally breaks a crayon from school; Sally struggles to write a report; Sally gives a report on oceans. DVD Release: Peanuts by Schulz: School Days
24a	"A Bad Mood"	Nicolas Gallet	August 26, 2016	N/A
Lucy tells Linus no one is happy all the time; Lucy bosses Linus around while he is watching TV; Linus wants to teach Sally how to pass in football. DVD Release: Peanuts by Schulz: Go Team Go!
24b	"Back to School"	August 29, 2016	N/A	
Sally goes to beanbag camp; Sally is not ready to go back to school; Sally practices waiting for the bus; Sally prepares Charlie Brown's school lunch and they miss the bus. DVD Release: Peanuts by Schulz: School Days
24c	"Go to School!"	August 30, 2016	N/A	
Sally talks to school buildings; Sally is not ready to go back to school; Sally makes her own answers for a test; Charlie Brown and Sally talk numbers; Sally questions field trips. DVD Release: Peanuts by Schulz: School Days
25a	"Go for it, Charlie Brown!"	August 31, 2016	N/A	
Charlie Brown is upset over not being tough; Charlie Brown wants Lucy to mess up while jumping rope; Lucy uses math to solve Charlie Brown's love troubles. DVD Release: Peanuts by Schulz: It's Only Love & Peanuts by Schulz: Lucy & Friends
25b	"Amateurs"	Olivier Jean-Marie	September 1, 2016	N/A
Marcie tries to throw a football. Peppermint Patty wants to trade Marcie for Lucy in baseball. Peppermint Patty tries to teach Lucy baseball. DVD Release: Peanuts by Schulz: Go Team Go!
25c	"School Anxiety"	September 2, 2016	N/A	
Sally is anxious about school; Linus writes an essay on appreciating school; Peppermint Patty cannot raise her head from sleeping; Linus fails a true or false test. DVD Release: Peanuts by Schulz: School Days
26a	"Autumn is Here"	Olivier Jean-Marie	October 3, 2016	0.09
Snoopy plays with the falling leaves. Linus talks to leaves; Peppermint Patty's hair gets caught in her binder; Peppermint Patty convinces Marcie to play football in the rain. DVD Release: Peanuts by Schulz: Go Team Go!
26b	"A Fascinating Friend"	October 4, 2016	0.11	
Linus gets called "mister" by Lydia and feels old. Lydia wants Linus to treat her for Valentine's Day; Linus asks for Lydia's address. DVD Releases: Peanuts by Schulz: It's Only Love & Peanuts by Schulz: Happy Holidays
26c	"Keep Your Chin Up, Charlie Brown"	October 5, 2016	N/A	
Charlie Brown asks the kite-eating tree to give back his kite; Snoopy has a bad dream about kites; Charlie Brown tries to find a special card in packs of bubblegum. DVD Releases: Peanuts by Schulz: School Days & Peanuts by Schulz: Springtime
27a	"Misunderstanding"	October 6, 2016	N/A	
Marcie defends herself on the bus. Marcie and Peppermint Patty hear something while they try to sleep at camp; A boy named Floyd keeps calling Marcie "lambcake" and she does not like it; Peppermint Patty tells Floyd love is painful; Floyd wants a picture with Marcie. DVD Release: Peanuts by Schulz: It's Only Love
27b	"Too Cute"	October 7, 2016	0.04	
Sally gets a love letter; Charlie Brown and Sally have to buy school supplies; Charlie Brown tells Sally to sleep off the bad day; Charlie Brown writes Sally's book report. DVD Releases: Peanuts by Schulz: School Days & Peanuts by Schulz: It's Only Love
27c	"Team Spirit"	Olivier Jean-Marie	October 10, 2016	N/A
Frieda joins Charlie Brown's baseball team; Charlie Brown gets hit on the head; Lucy's only focus during the game is her baseball glove. DVD Release: Peanuts by Schulz: Go Team Go!
28a	"Just for Love"	October 11, 2016	N/A	
Lucy thinks Schroeder is cute; Frieda is at Schroeder's piano; Frieda offers a used Valentine. DVD Releases: Peanuts by Schulz: It's Only Love & Peanuts by Schulz: Happy Holidays
28b	"That Day"	October 12, 2016	N/A	
Sally asks Santa for a job. DVD Release: Peanuts by Schulz: Happy Holidays
28c	"Colors"	October 13, 2016	N/A	
Lucy criticizes Linus's coloring. DVD Releases: Peanuts by Schulz: School Days & Peanuts by Schulz: Lucy & Friends
29a	"Trust Me"	Olivier Jean-Marie	October 14, 2016	N/A
Lucy holds the football for Charlie Brown. DVD Releases: Peanuts by Schulz: Go Team Go! & Peanuts by Schulz: Springtime
29b	"School Tomorrow"	October 17, 2016	N/A	
Charlie Brown procrastinates; Sally must write a whole page about George Washington. DVD Release: Peanuts by Schulz: School Days
29c	"Nice Doggy"	Nicolas Gallet	October 18, 2016	N/A
Charlie Brown tells Linus the story of how he got Snoopy. DVD Release: Peanuts by Schulz: Snoopy Tales
30a	"Company"	Nicolas Gallet	October 19, 2016	N/A
Rerun wants a dog, and wants to borrow Snoopy; Rerun wants a role model; Rerun wins a balloon. DVD Release: Peanuts by Schulz: Snoopy Tales
30b	"Reach for the Stars"	Nicolas Gallet	October 20, 2016	N/A
Sally asks about a science program on TV. Charlie Brown and Linus watch the stars; Sally doubts the Tooth Fairy exits; Snoopy's dog house catches fire. DVD Release: Peanuts by Schulz: Snoopy Tales
30c	"Creepy Crawlies"	Nicolas Gallet	October 21, 2016	N/A
Woodstock has a creature in his nest. Linus explains the importance of bugs; Lucy and Sally meet a bug; Snoopy has a bug in his supper dish. DVD Release: Peanuts by Schulz: Go Team Go!
31a	"Kind of Spooky"	October 24, 2016	N/A	
Sally does not want to kick a football; Linus watches a scary movie about feet; Linus and Charlie Brown discuss writing to the Great Pumpkin and Santa. DVD Release: Peanuts by Schulz: Happy Holidays
31b	"Fly"	Nicholas Gallet	October 25, 2016	N/A
Woodstock and Snoopy fly; Linus and Snoopy time Woodstock's flying; Woodstock gets trained to go to the Moon. DVD Release: Peanuts by Schulz: Snoopy Tales
31c	"Feeling Insecure"	Nicolas Gallet	October 26, 2016	N/A
Snoopy must get Linus's blanket back from a cat. DVD Release: Peanuts by Schulz: Snoopy Tales
32a	"Always Right"	Nicolas Gallet	October 27, 2016	N/A
Lucy wants respect; Rerun sells his art; Linus guides Snoopy. DVD Releases: Peanuts by Schulz: Snoopy Tales & Peanuts by Schulz: Happy Holidays
32b	"Out of Order"	October 28, 2016	N/A	
Linus is aware of his tongue; Linus leaves a tooth for the Tooth Fairy. DVD Release: Peanuts by Schulz: Lucy & Friends
32c	"Problems"	November 1, 2016	N/A	
Peppermint Patty likes numbers but not math. DVD Release: Peanuts by Schulz: School Days
33a	"Classic"	November 2, 2016	N/A	
Lucy questions Schroeder's practicing the piano; Peppermint Patty and Marcie go to a concert. DVD Release: Peanuts by Schulz: Lucy & Friends
33b	"Even the Score"	Nicholas Gallet	November 3, 2016	N/A
Linus analyzes a snowball; Snoopy gives Linus and Lucy tickets to a bird hockey game; Linus helps Charlie Brown write a letter to Santa. Lucy is annoyed at her Christmas gifts. DVD Releases: Peanuts by Schulz: Snoopy Tales & Peanuts by Schulz: Happy Holidays
33c	"Birds of a Feather"	November 4, 2016	N/A	
Woodstock and other birds stage a protest; Linus thinks Woodstock is a Canada goose; Linus reads Woodstock's grandpa's diary; Woodstock writes a Mother's Day letter; Woodstock befriends a snowman. DVD Releases: Peanuts by Schulz: Springtime & Peanuts by Schulz: Happy Holidays
34a	"Sally"	November 12, 2016	N/A	
Sally insists on homework help; Sally breaks a ruler; Sally keeps a list of people who did not give her Christmas cards; Sally draws a world map; Sally is afraid of a snowman. DVD Releases: Peanuts by Schulz: School Days & Peanuts by Schulz: Happy Holidays
34b	"A Hard Winter"	Nicholas Gallet	November 12, 2016	N/A
Linus explains to Lucy why birds need breadcrumbs; Charlie Brown wants Snoopy to be a better watchdog; Linus builds an army of snowmen. Lucy has a contract for snow shoveling. DVD Release: Peanuts by Schulz: Snoopy Tales
34c	"Winter Games"	November 12, 2016	N/A	
Charlie Brown and Linus catch snowflakes on their tongues. DVD Release: Peanuts by Schulz: Happy Holidays
35a	"On the Campaign Trail"	November 25, 2016	N/A	
Linus decides to run for class president. Sally interviews Linus during his election. Lucy assists in Linus's polls for presidency. DVD Releases: Peanuts by Schulz: School Days & Peanuts by Schulz: Happy Holidays
35b	"Christmas is On Its Way"	December 24, 2016	0.18	
Peppermint Patty wants to find someone less intelligent than her to help her grading curve; Sally compares the sadness of leaves falling to lack of presents on Christmas for Show and Tell. DVD Release: Peanuts by Schulz: Happy Holidays
35c	"Winter Wonderland"	Nicholas Gallet	December 24, 2016	0.18
Lucy asks Linus to tell snow to stop falling; Snoopy tries to throw a snowball at Lucy; Lucy builds and destroys a snowman; Woodstock wants a Christmas stocking; Charlie Brown helps Linus write a letter to Santa Claus. DVD Releases: Peanuts by Schulz: Snoopy Tales & Peanuts by Schulz: Happy Holidays
36a	"Let It Snow"	Nicholas Gallet	December 24, 2016	0.18
Linus asks Lucy to write a letter to Santa for him; Sally questions Santa's Nice versus Naughty list. Snoopy and Woodstock enjoy snowflakes; Lucy needs a skating partner. DVD Releases: Peanuts by Schulz: Snoopy Tales & Peanuts by Schulz: Happy Holidays
36b	"Get Lucky"	December 24, 2016	0.13	
Peppermint Patty recommends an open-book test in class. Peppermint Patty has to read a book over Christmas break. DVD Releases: Peanuts by Schulz: School Days & Peanuts by Schulz: Happy Holidays
36c	"Weird Little Brother"	December 24, 2016	0.13	
Linus pats birds on the head; Linus and Lucy need a measles shot; Lucy does not like Linus's letter to Santa; Lucy wants Linus to break his blanket habit. DVD Releases: Peanuts by Schulz: Lucy & Friends & Peanuts by Schulz: Happy Holidays
37	"Christmas is Coming (Do Not Watch Until Christmas)"	Nicholas Gallet	December 24, 2016	0.13
Snoopy does not want to wait until Christmas to open gifts; Charlie Brown tries to afford a gift for a girl; Rerun wants Snoopy to be his sled dog; Charlie Brown cannot walk in his heavy coat. DVD Releases: Peanuts by Schulz: Snoopy Tales & Peanuts by Schulz: Happy Holidays

== Home media ==
The first DVD Snoopy Tales containing 32 episodes was released by Warner Home Video on January 24, 2017.

The second DVD Go Team Go! containing 19 episodes was released on April 25, 2017.

The third DVD School Days containing 29 episodes was released on August 19, 2017.

The fourth DVD Peanuts by Schulz: It's Only Love containing 18 episodes was released on January 8, 2019.

The fifth DVD Peanuts by Schulz: Springtime containing 15 episodes was released on February 26, 2019.

The sixth DVD Peanuts by Schulz: Lucy and Friends containing 16 episodes was released on June 4, 2019.

The seventh DVD Peanuts by Schulz: Happy Holidays containing 26 episodes was released on September 10, 2019.
