= David Popkins =

American baseball player and coach (born 1989)

Toronto Blue Jays – No. 79
- Hitting Coach
- Born: November 16, 1989 (age 36); San Diego, California, U.S.
- Bats: Switch Throws: Right

Teams
- As coach: Minnesota Twins (2022–2024); Toronto Blue Jays (2025–present)

David Joseph Popkins (born November 16, 1989) is an American professional baseball hitting coach for the Toronto Blue Jays of Major League Baseball (MLB). He has previously coached in MLB for the Minnesota Twins.

Popkins played college baseball for the UC Davis Aggies from 2009 to 2012, where he tied the program record for most hits in a single game with six. Following his collegiate career, he signed with the St. Louis Cardinals as an undrafted free agent in June 2012. Popkins went on to play three seasons of Minor League Baseball (MiLB) in the Cardinals' system from 2012 to 2014, reaching Double-A before the conclusion of his playing career.

After his playing career, Popkins joined the Los Angeles Dodgers organization in 2019 as a hitting coach for their minor league affiliates and held that role through the 2021 season. He then joined the Twins in 2022 and served as a hitting coach through the 2024 season. In 2025, Popkins joined the Blue Jays as a hitting coach, where he was named Baseball America's 2025 MLB Coach of the Year after the Blue Jays led MLB in several offensive categories and reached the 2025 World Series.

== Early life ==
Popkins was born on November 16, 1989, in San Diego, California. His mother, Delores, was a teacher, and his father, Michael, is a San Diego Superior Court judge and former public defender.

== High school career ==
Popkins attended St. Augustine High School in San Diego, California, graduating in 2008. He was a two-way player for the school's baseball team, the St. Augustine Saints. In his junior season, Popkins earned first-team All-Eastern League honors. During his senior season, he had a .422 batting average, a .525 on-base percentage (OBP), eight home runs, and 42 runs batted in (RBIs). As a pitcher, Popkins recorded a 5–2 win–loss record and 3.02 earned run average (ERA). His senior season accolades included his second first-team All-Eastern League selection, the Eastern League Player of the Year award, and first-team all-state honors for medium schools. Popkins received All-CIF San Diego Section honors every year of his high school career.

In addition to baseball, Popkins also played football. He played as a quarterback on the school's football team, throwing for 1,304 yards and 16 touchdowns in his senior season.

== College career ==
Popkins played college baseball for the UC Davis Aggies from 2009 to 2012.

Popkins played sparingly in his freshman season in 2009, playing in 11 games. He finished the season batting 2-for-18 with a .111 batting average as a designated hitter and pinch hitter. As a pitcher, Popkins finished the season with a 0–1 win–loss record, a 13.08 earned run average (ERA), and 12 strikeouts in 21 1/3 innings pitched across 11 games (one start).

Popkins had a standout sophomore season in 2010. He had an 11-game hitting streak that started May 14 and lasted through the end of the season. During this period, he was named Big West Field Player of the Week on May 24 after going 11-for-14 with a .786 batting average, two home runs, and eight runs batted in (RBIs) in a three-game series against UC Santa Barbara from May 21 to May 23. He finished the season with a .388 batting average, five home runs, and 43 RBIs in 51 games. He led the UC Davis offense with a team-high .388 batting average, 43 RBIs, and 73 hits. His .388 batting average ranked third in the Big West Conference. As a pitcher, he finished the season with a 3–2 record, a 6.67 ERA, and 18 strikeouts in 29 2/3 innings pitched across 16 games (two starts). He earned his first career All-Big West First Team honors.

During his junior season in 2011, Popkins had a 14-game hitting streak during the second half of the season, in which he went 21-for-44 with a .477 batting average, one home run, and seven RBIs. He finished the season with a .321 batting average, four home runs, and 23 RBIs in 54 games. Popkins led the UC Davis offense once again with a team-high .321 batting average, 23 RBIs, and 63 hits. He was one of two players on the team to play in all 54 games of the season, starting 53 games as either an outfielder or designated hitter. As a pitcher, he finished the season with a 0–0 record, a 1.37 ERA, allowing seven runs with three earned runs, and 10 strikeouts in 19 2/3 innings pitched across 13 relief appearances. Popkins earned ABCA/Rawlings All-West Region Second Team honors and his second career All-Big West First Team honors after his junior season.

During his senior season in 2012, Popkins went 6-for-8 in a game against Cal State Bakersfield on February 24. With this performance, he remains tied for the most hits in a single game in program history with six. Popkins did not pitch during his senior season and finished with a .276 batting average, five home runs, and 18 RBIs in 50 games.

Popkins concluded his college baseball career as a two-time All-Big West First Team selection.

== Professional career ==
=== Minor leagues (2012–2014) ===
After a four-season college baseball career at UC Davis, Popkins signed with the St. Louis Cardinals as an undrafted free agent on June 19, 2012. The following day, he was assigned to the Rookie-level GCL Cardinals on June 20, where he made his professional debut a day later on June 21. Weeks later, Popkins was promoted to the Short-Season A Batavia Muckdogs on August 2, where he spent the rest of the season. Popkins finished the 2012 season batting a combined .288/.372/.432 with one home run and 17 runs batted in (RBIs) in 44 games.

Popkins began the 2013 season with the Class A Peoria Chiefs before being promoted to the Advanced-A Palm Beach Cardinals on April 25, where he spent the rest of the season. With the Cardinals, he was named the Florida State League (FSL) Topps Player of the Month for June after leading the FSL with a .413 batting average and 38 hits. His .450 on-base percentage (OBP) was second in the league, .598 slugging percentage (SLG) was fourth in the league, 1.048 on-base plus slugging (OPS) was third in the league, and 18 runs scored was fifth in the league. He recorded a hit in his first 12 games of the month and recorded at least one hit in 22 of 24 games played for the month. Popkin's finished the 2013 season batting a combined .310/.371/.453 with six home runs and 45 RBIs in 97 games. He was named an FSL Post-Season All-Star in recognition of his performance throughout the season.

Popkins began the 2014 season with the Double-A Springfield Cardinals before a brief stint back with the Palm Beach Cardinals after being demoted on July 9. He was promoted back to the Springfield Cardinals on August 6, where he spent the rest of the season. During a game against the Tulsa Drillers on August 23, Popkins made the first and only pitching appearance of his minor league career. He entered as a reliever for pitcher Chris Thomas to start the top of the ninth inning with the Cardinals trailing 10–2. He gave up a three-run home run to David Kandilas before striking out Chris O'Dowd to end the inning. The Cardinals eventually lost the game 13–3. Popkins finished the 2014 season batting a combined .243/.313/.358 with seven home runs and 34 RBIs in 115 games. As a pitcher, he finished the season with a 0–0 win–loss record, a 27.00 earned run average (ERA), and one strikeout in 1.0 inning pitched in one relief appearance.

After three seasons in Minor League Baseball (MiLB) within the St. Louis Cardinals' system, Popkins was released by the Springfield Cardinals on April 3, 2015. Throughout his minor league career, he primarily played as an outfielder, covering both left field and right field positions defensively.

=== Washington Wild Things (2015–2016) ===
After his minor league career, Popkins played for the Washington Wild Things of the Frontier League.

Popkins finished the 2015 season batting .232/.361/.505 with 20 home runs and 46 RBIs in 93 games.

Popkins finished the 2016 season batting .281/.411/.533 with 15 home runs and 48 RBIs in 94 games.

=== Sioux Falls Canaries (2017) ===
Popkins played for the Sioux Falls Canaries of the American Association of Professional Baseball for the 2017 season. He finished the season batting .107/.167/.143 with two RBIs in seven games.

After the 2017 season, Popkins retired from professional baseball.

== Coaching career ==
=== Minor leagues (2019–2021) ===
After working in hitting labs, Popkins found a permanent position within the Philadelphia Phillies' system. He called Robert Van Scoyoc, a private hitting instructor he'd previously worked with, to inform him that he was accepting the role. By then, Van Scoyoc had become the Los Angeles Dodgers' hitting coach and wanted Popkins to work with the Dodgers instead. The Dodgers did not have an open salaried position to add another coach, but they circumvented this by signing Popkins as a free agent to a minor league contract as a player on March 16, 2019. Under this unique arrangement, Popkins would not appear in a single game but would function as a player-coach. Upon joining the Dodgers organization in 2019, Popkins was tasked with coaching Justin Washington, a relief pitcher who had played college baseball for the Savannah State Tigers and was attempting a transition to hitting in the Dodgers' lowest levels. The two worked together every day for two hours; Washington subsequently finished his first minor league season with a .272 batting average and an .824 on-base plus slugging (OPS), the best offensive season of his career.

In his second season with the Dodgers organization, Popkins was named a hitting coach for the AZL Dodgers, the team's Rookie-level affiliate. However, the 2020 season was entirely canceled due to the COVID-19 pandemic. The following year, Popkins was named the hitting coach for the Great Lakes Loons, the Dodgers' High-A affiliate, for the 2021 season.

=== Minnesota Twins (2022–2024) ===
On November 8, 2021, the Minnesota Twins hired Popkins to be the team's co-hitting coach. After three seasons with the Twins, Popkins was dismissed by the organization on October 1, 2024.

=== Toronto Blue Jays (2025–present) ===
On October 21, 2024, the Toronto Blue Jays hired Popkins to be the team's new hitting coach.

In Popkins' first season in charge of the Blue Jays' offense, the team employed a contact-first approach and finished the 2025 regular season leading MLB in several offensive categories while ranking near the top in others. The Blue Jays led MLB with a .265 batting average, a .333 on-base percentage (OBP), and 1,461 hits. They recorded 1,099 strikeouts, the second-fewest in MLB ahead of the Kansas City Royals' 1096 strikeouts. The Blue Jays ranked third in MLB with a .760 on-base plus slugging (OPS), which was second in the American League (AL) behind the New York Yankees' .787 OPS. They tied for third in MLB with the Chicago Cubs with 771 runs batted in (RBIs), ranking second in the AL behind the Yankees' 820 RBIs. The team ranked fourth in MLB with 798 runs scored, which was second in the AL behind the Yankees' 849 runs scored.

The Blue Jays finished the 2025 postseason leading MLB in almost every offensive category with 667 at bats, a .285 batting average, a .352 OBP, a .471 slugging percentage (SLG), a .823 OPS, 28 home runs, 99 RBIs, 190 hits, 36 doubles, 105 runs scored, and 314 total bases. Additionally, they tied for first in MLB with the Los Angeles Dodgers and Philadelphia Phillies with two triples, which was first in the AL, and ranked second in MLB with 61 walks, behind the Dodgers' 68 walks.

On December 10, 2025, Popkins was named Baseball America's 2025 MLB Coach of the Year.
