= St. Augustine High School (San Diego) =

Private, day, college-prep school in San Diego, California, United States

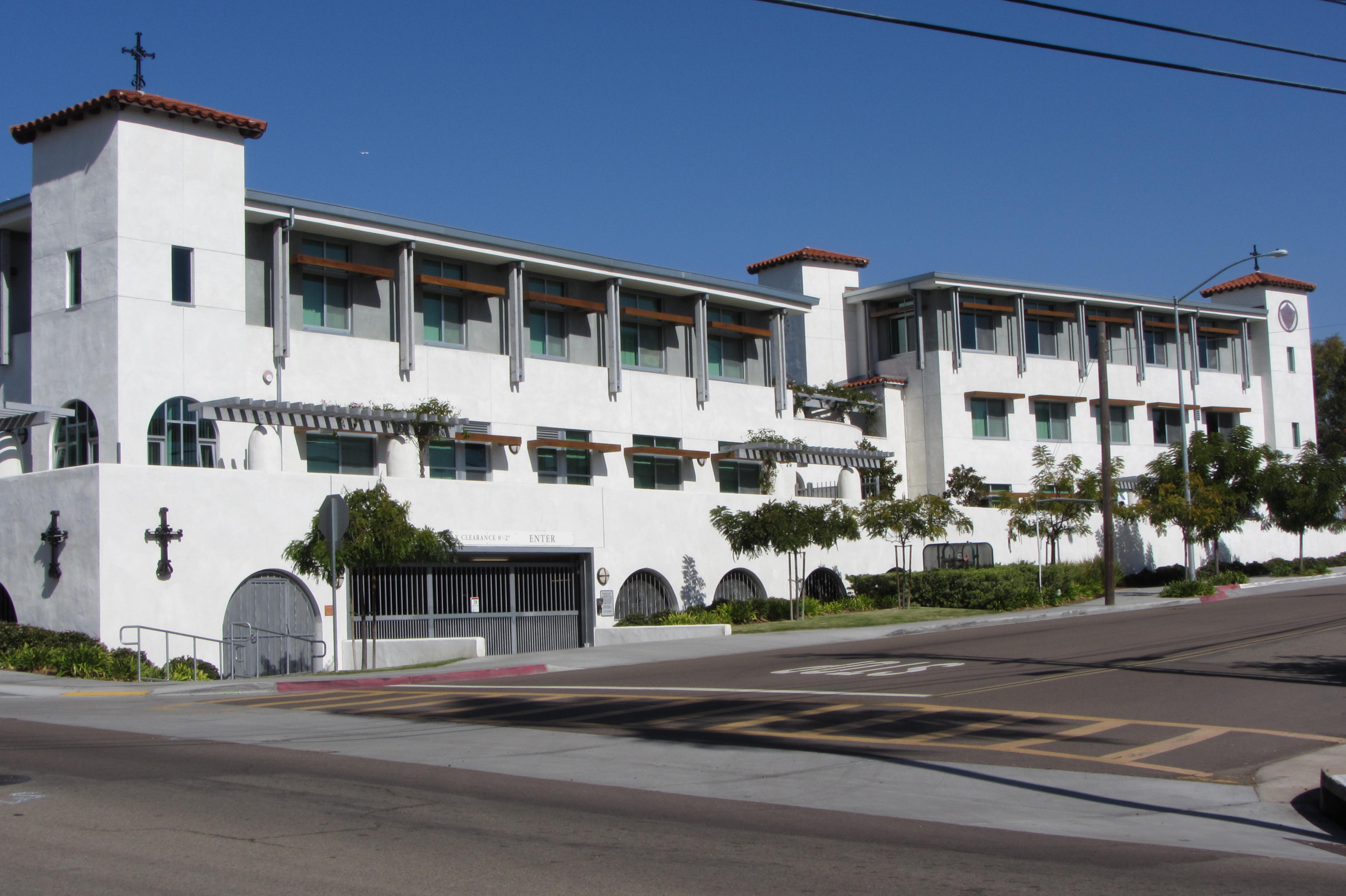
- St. Augustine High School, taken from the corner of 32nd Street and Nutmeg Street

Location
- 3266 Nutmeg Street; San Diego, California 92104; United States; 32°44′3″N 117°7′25″W

Information
- Type: Private, Day, College-prep
- Motto: Unitas ∙ Veritas ∙ Caritas (Unity ∙ Truth ∙ Love)
- Religious affiliations: Catholic; Order of Saint Augustine
- Patron saint: St. Augustine
- Established: 1922
- Sister school: The Academy of Our Lady of Peace
- President: Edwin Hearn
- Principal: James Horne
- Chaplain: Br. Tony Moreno
- Staff: 80
- Teaching staff: 64 (on an FTE basis)
- Grades: 9–12
- Gender: Boys
- Enrollment: 729 (2023-24)
  - Grade 9: 190
  - Grade 10: 194
  - Grade 11: 170
  - Grade 12: 175
- Student to teacher ratio: 11.4:1
- Campus size: 7.2 acres (29,000 m^{2})
- Colors: Royal Purple and Vegas Gold
- Athletics: 15 sports
- Athletics conference: CIF San Diego Section
- Mascot: Halo Joe
- Team name: Saints
- Rival: Cathedral Catholic
- Accreditation: Western Association of Schools and Colleges
- Publication: "Saints Scene" (Community Newsletter)
- Newspaper: The Augustinian
- Yearbook: Saintsman
- School fees: Registration Fee: $260; Tuition Deposit: $200; Senior Fee: $307; Junior Fee: $302; Sophomore Fee: $272; Freshman Fee: $315; Graduation Fee: $200
- Tuition: $27,794.00 (2024–2025)
- Affiliation: Roman Catholic Diocese of San Diego
- Website: sahs.org

St. Augustine High School is a private Catholic high school for young men under the direction of the Order of Saint Augustine, located in the North Park neighborhood of San Diego, California, and founded in 1922. It is located in the Diocese of San Diego and is a member of the Augustinian Secondary Education Association.

Named after Saint Augustine of Hippo, an early Christian theologian, St. Augustine High School teaches young men within the framework of the Catholic faith and in the Augustinian tradition. This culturally diverse school serves the communities of San Diego County and Tijuana, Mexico. The school also publicly states, "We open our doors to all boys we believe will benefit from our academic program."

== History ==
=== Early history - 1920s to the 1950s ===
==== Creation ====
In 1922, John Cantwell, Bishop of the Diocese of Los Angeles and San Diego, asked the Order of Saint Augustine to satisfy the need for a new boys' school in the southern part of the 80,000-square-mile (210,000 km^{2}) diocese. The Order of Saint Augustine opened St. Augustine High School on September 18, 1922 in the meeting hall of St. Vincent de Paul Catholic Church, with 19 students. The school moved to its current Nutmeg Street location in 1923. Many of the school's religious staff were trained at Villanova University and Merrimack College, which are both run by the Order of Saint Augustine.

==== Student affairs and expansion ====
To accommodate more students, the school expanded multiple times in its early history, beginning with the construction of Sullivan Hall in 1947, which added 350 spots. In the 1950s, the school constructed a new set of classrooms and added additional improvements to the monastery. In 1957, a new gymnasium, Dougherty Gym, was built. Despite these expansions, by the late 1950s, the school was suffering from overcrowding.

In 1956, the school became the first private school admitted to the San Diego City League of Athletics.

=== Middle period - 1960s to the 1970s ===
During the 1960s and 1970s, the school introduced smaller class sizes, curricular innovations, and honors programs. In September 1978, PSA Flight 182 crashed and exploded at the corner of Dwight and Nile Streets, several blocks from the campus. The school shut down and became a triage and command and control center for those authorities who responded to the emergency posed by the crash, culminating in the utilization of the gymnasium as a makeshift morgue. The following year, an arsonist burned down the school's library, which has since moved to Villanova Hall.

=== Into the modern era - 1980s to the present day ===
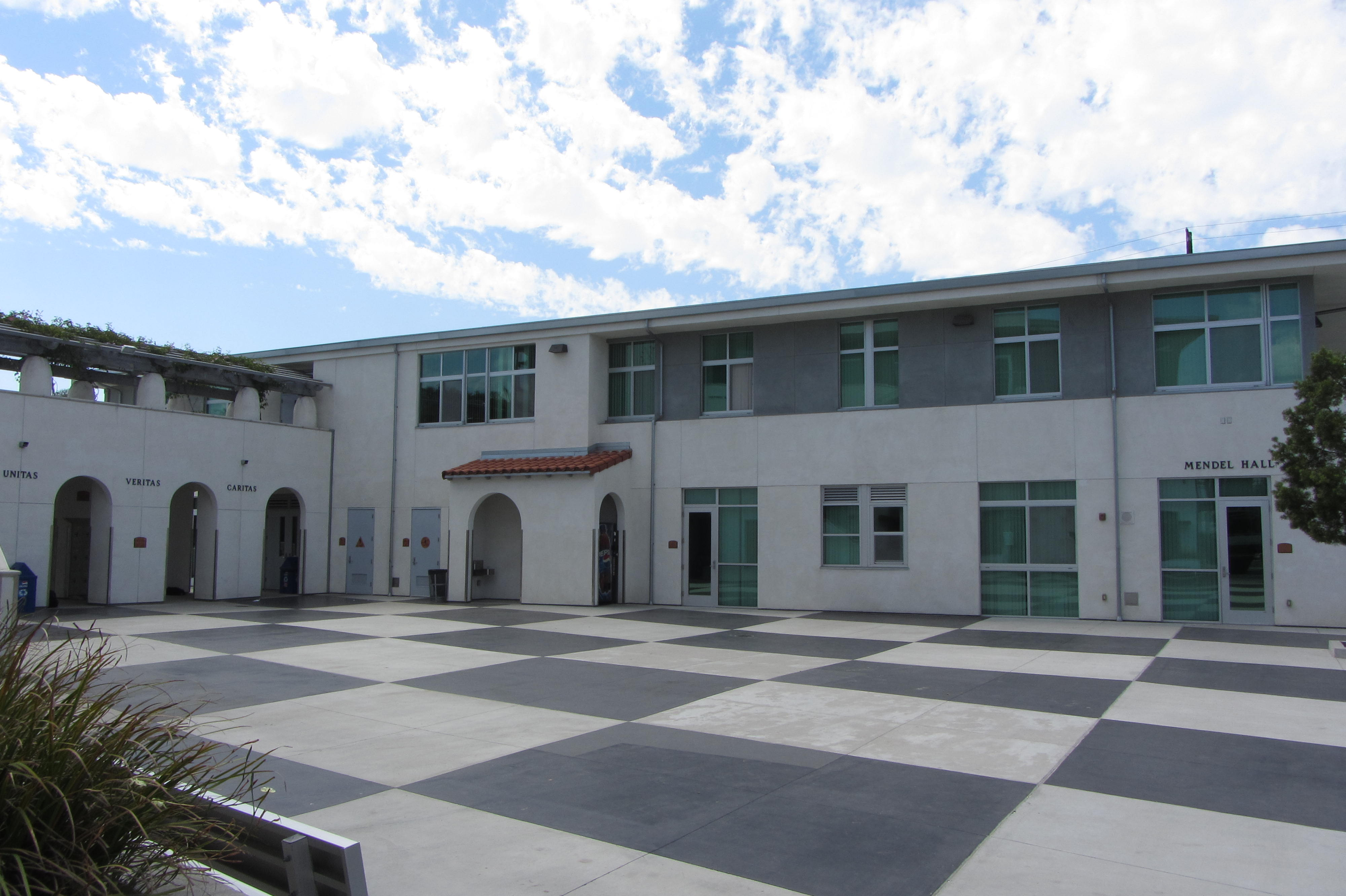
New buildings completed in 2007

In the 1980s and 1990s, the school moved towards computerization, and renovations occurred around the campus. The biggest change during this era was the creation of an on-campus parking lot and the closure of a portion of Bancroft Street, which previously divided the campus into two separate sections. In 1997, the school celebrated its 75th anniversary. The school continued to grow in the new millennium and embarked on a three-phase building campaign in which most of the school was demolished and rebuilt to meet modern standards of building codes and architectural tastes.

Phase One of the renovations included the demolition of most of the classroom buildings, which were replaced by two new buildings, Mendel Hall and Villanova Hall. On June 2, 2006, together with the San Diego mayor Jerry Sanders, the Auxiliary Bishop of San Diego Salvatore Cordileone, the school's President John Keller O.S.A., ASB President Alexander Guittard, and various members of the Augustinian and general school community, the school broke ground for Phase One. Work for Phase One was completed in fall 2007. The second phase consisted of the new Saint Augustine Commons, a multipurpose gymnasium, and meeting space. Work began in late 2015 and was completed in 2017. Phase Three focused on a renovation of the old gymnasium, Dougherty Gym. Construction began on July 17, 2017, and concluded on September 12, 2018. The gym was mainly repurposed as a theater, but also included a new weight room and a band room.

== Tuition ==
Tuition at St. Augustine for the 2024–25 year is $27,794. However, students can apply for tuition assistance, whether in the form of a grant, a scholarship, or by working for the school at Marty's Kitchen, the school's lunch counter. The top ten scorers on the entrance exam each receive a $10,000 scholarship each year, for a total amount of $40,000 over all four years.

== Student profiles ==
=== Demographics ===
The student body consists of many different national origins.

Most students live near and within typical driving distance of the school. The bulk of students live in San Diego and surrounding areas, including La Mesa, Kearny Mesa, Point Loma, Downtown, and the Beach areas. However, some students have longer commutes from areas in the North (such as Carlsbad, Del Mar, Escondido, Oceanside, and Vista), the East (such as Poway and Lakeside), and the South (such as Chula Vista, Eastlake, and Bonita). In addition, several students commute daily from Tijuana. Most students are Catholic; however, the school accommodates people of other faiths, including non-Christian ones and some degree of non-faith in personal belief.

== Academics ==
=== Curriculum ===
Saints offers courses in the following subjects:

- Religion
- Social Studies
- World Languages
- English
- Mathematics
- Sciences
- Visual and Performing Arts
- Computer Science and Technology
- Physical Education

=== Scheduling ===
A new block schedule was introduced after the COVID-19 pandemic. The school day starts at 7:45 am and ends at 2:00 pm. On Mondays, students have all six blocks, each being 50 minutes long. On Tuesdays and Thursdays, students have Blocks 1, 3, and 5, each class being 1 hour and 25 minutes long. On Wednesdays and Fridays, students have Blocks 2, 4, and 6, each class also being 1 hour and 25 minutes long. Each morning, except for Mondays, from 7:45 to 8:45, there is a non-class period. On Tuesdays and Fridays, all teachers have office hours, allowing students to ask questions or receive help with assignments. Office hours are not mandatory. Every Wednesday morning, the entire school comes together for Mass, and on Thursday morning, all students must go to their homeroom, which they are assigned at the beginning of the school year. Both Mass and homeroom are mandatory.

=== Intersession ===
During January, students at Saint Augustine High School take a hiatus from their regular schedule to take a specialized class or internship. All freshmen and transfer students are required to take a mandatory speech class as their first intersession, but afterward, they may pick from a multitude of classes to take that month. Such classes include:

- Cooking
- Marine Biology
- Cycling
- Python Programming
- Robotics
- Engineering
- Sport Fishing

There are also travel programs available, with notable locations being New York City, Italy, and San Lucas Toliman, among others.

As seniors, students may take an internship in place of their standard internship course. Such internship opportunities include:

- Business and Finance
- Law
- Biotech
- Engineering
- Veterinary Medicine

However, a student may have an internship wherever they want, so long as they are available to intern there.

=== Retreats ===
Students experience several (including three mandatory) retreats at Saint Augustine. These retreats are:

- Freshman Retreat
  - This retreat takes place about a month after the school year has started, during which the entire freshman class is split into several groups where they discuss and learn about the Saints community and their place in it. The groups are led by a pair of either junior or senior "Big Brothers." The freshmen arrive early Saturday morning and leave late that night. They return on Sunday morning for Mass and final activities and are dismissed on Sunday afternoon. This retreat is mandatory.
- Sophomore Retreat
  - This one-day retreat at Balboa Park focuses on community. Sophomores are split into groups, led by one junior or senior "Big Brother." This retreat includes multiple team-building activities, such as a scavenger hunt for landmarks around Balboa Park. This retreat is also mandatory.
- Junior Pilgrimage
  - The Junior Pilgrimage is a one-day event, in which students walk from the St. Augustine campus, through Balboa Park, to St. Vincent de Paul Catholic Parish & School, where the first year of classes at Saints were held. Students then walk back to the St. Augustine campus down University Avenue.
- Kairos Retreat
  - Kairos is an optional, but strongly encouraged senior retreat that takes place several times per year. The retreat is led by faculty and senior students who have already been on Kairos.

== Extracurricular activities ==
=== Athletics ===
==== Teams ====
The school supports numerous sports teams that are accredited by the CIF (SDS Division), such as:

- Baseball
- Basketball
- Beach Volleyball
- Cross Country
- Football
- Golf
- Lacrosse
- Rugby
- Soccer
- Surfing
- Swimming
- Tennis
- Track and field
- Volleyball
- Wrestling

In these sports, the Saints have 25 total CIF San Diego Division III Championship teams.

In the past few years, several club sports have been organized by the student body. These sports are either non-traditional sports or the sport club has not been credited by CIF.

==== Intramurals ====
The student body actively participates in Intramural sports. Teams are organized by homeroom, and generally, teams of one grade play the same grade and gradually move to play other grades.

- Football
- Basketball

=== Rivalries ===
The most prevalent rivalry is between the Saints and USDHS/Cathedral, which has spanned many years. Since the early 1970s, a yearly 'Charity Bowl' (now called the 'Holy Bowl'), first hosted at Jack Murphy Stadium (Qualcomm Stadium) sponsored by local businessman Jack Kumpel (aka "Allen Kent") and featuring Bob Hope, occasionally at Balboa Stadium, then at Southwestern College Stadium, and now held at either school's home football field, alternating between Cathedral in odd years, and Saints in even years. Has been the highlight of the rivalry. The two schools' football teams have met every season since the foundation of University High, except for 2007, when the game was canceled as part of a county-wide cancellation of all high school sports during the October wildfires and was not rescheduled.

== Notable alumni ==
Name	Grad Class	Category	Best Known For
Roger Hedgecock		Politics	Former Mayor of San Diego and current conservative talk radio host
Ralph Inzunza		Politics	Former San Diego City Councilman
Brynton Lemar		Athletics	American-born Jamaican basketball player for Hapoel Jerusalem B.C. of the Israeli Basketball Premier League
Jelani McCoy	1995	Athletics	Former National Basketball Association player
David Popkins	2008	Athletics	Former St. Louis Cardinals minor leaguer, current Toronto Blue Jays hitting coach
Fred Jones (linebacker, born 1977)		Athletics	NFL player
Darrell Russell (football player)	1994	Athletics	Late National Football League player
Bob Spence		Athletics	Former Major League Baseball player
Monte Jackson	1971	Athletics	Former National Football League player
Terry Jackson (cornerback)	1973	Athletics	Former NFL player
Brian Barden		Athletics	Former Major League Baseball player and Nippon Professional Baseball player for Hiroshima Toyo Carp
John D'Acquisto		Athletics	Former Major League Baseball player for the San Diego Padres
Servando Carrasco	2006	Athletics	Former professional soccer player for Orlando City SC
John Wathan		Athletics	Former Major League Baseball player
Trey Kell		Athletics	Basketball player
John Castellanos		Actor	Actor, best known for his role on the long-running soap opera The Young and the Restless
Gregory Nava		Film	Oscar-nominated film director, known for El Norte, Selena, and Why Do Fools Fall in Love
Brian Rikuda		Arts	Music entrepreneur and winner of Black Entertainment Television's Ultimate Hustler
Victor Buono		Actor	Actor, nominated for an Academy Award for his work in What Ever Happened to Baby Jane?
Tony Bill		Actor	Actor, producer, and director of the 1973 movie The Sting, for which he shared the Academy Award for Best Picture
Jorge R. Gutierrez		Arts	Mexican writer, director, creator, painter, and producer known for El Tigre: The Adventures of Manny Rivera, The Book of Life, and Maya and the Three
Thomas J. Whelan (judge)		Law	Senior United States District Court for the Southern District of California judge
Gracen Halton	2022	Athletics	College football defensive tackle for the Oklahoma Sooners

== See also ==
- Primary and secondary schools in San Diego, California
- St. Augustine of Hippo
