= Terry Jackson (cornerback) =

American football player (born 1955)

No. 24
- Position: Cornerback

Personal information
- Born: December 9, 1955 (age 70); Sherman, Texas, U.S.
- Listed height: 5 ft 10 in (1.78 m)
- Listed weight: 197 lb (89 kg)

Career information
- High school: St. Augustine (San Diego, California)
- College: San Diego State
- NFL draft: 1978: 5th round, 120th overall pick

Career history
- New York Giants (1978–1983); Seattle Seahawks (1984–1985)

Career NFL statistics
- Games played: 107
- Interceptions: 28
- Sacks: 5
- Touchdowns: 3
- Stats at Pro Football Reference

Terence Leon Jackson (born December 9, 1955) is an American former professional football player who was a cornerback in the National Football League (NFL). He was selected by the New York Giants in the fifth round of the 1978 NFL draft. He played college football for the San Diego State Aztecs.

Jackson also played for the Seattle Seahawks.

== Personal life ==
Jackson is the younger brother of former defensive back, Monte Jackson.
