= The Academy of Our Lady of Peace =

Private, all-female school in San Diego, California, United States

Academy of Our Lady of Peace
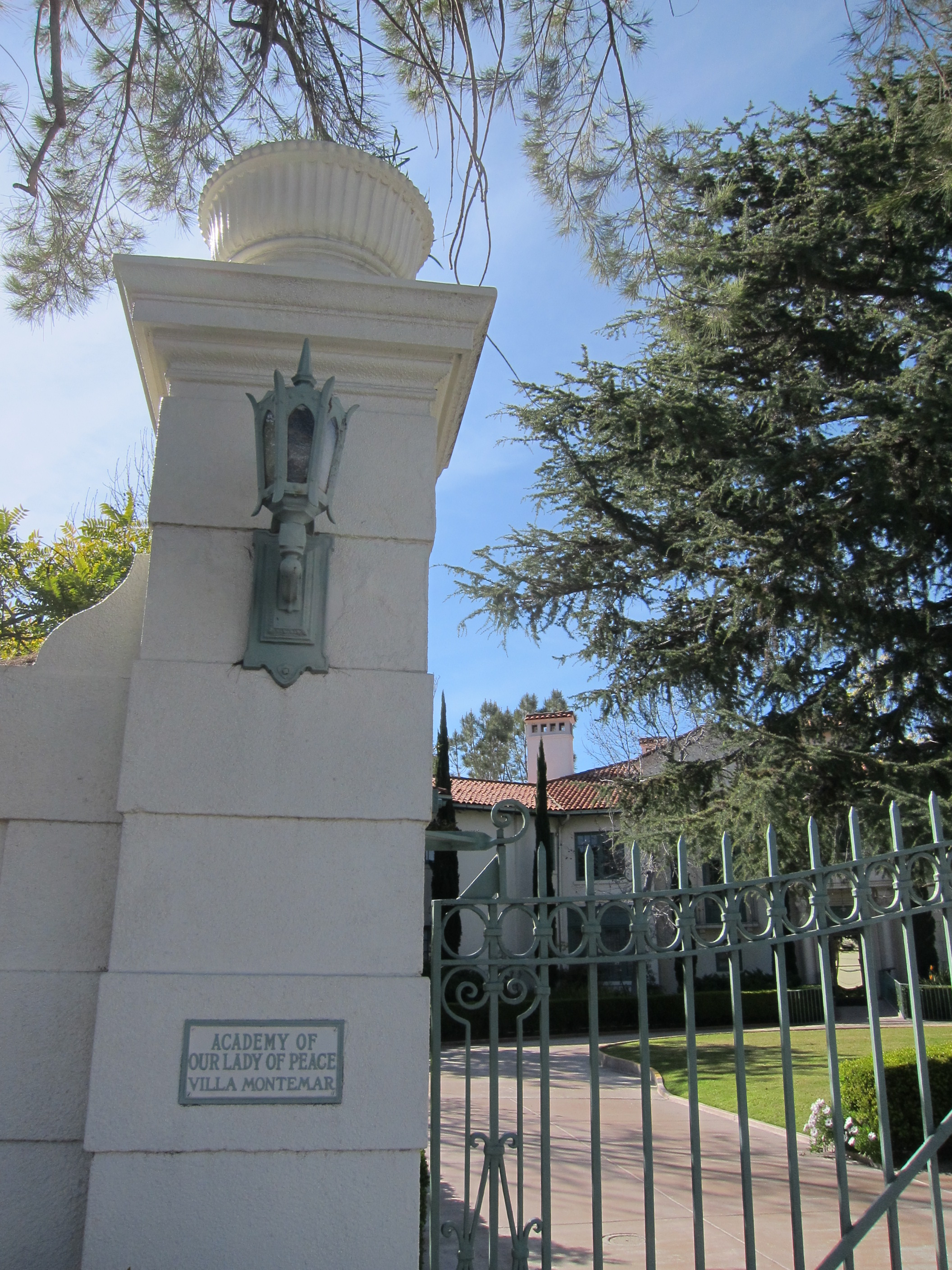

Location
- 4860 Oregon Street; San Diego, California 92116; United States; 32°45′55.8″N 117°8′7.6″W

Information
- Type: Private, All-Female
- Motto: Deus Illuminatio Mea ("God is My Light")
- Religious affiliations: Roman Catholic; Sisters of Saint Joseph of Carondelet
- Established: 1882
- Founder: Sister Maria
- Head of school: Lauren Lek
- Staff: 52
- Faculty: 37
- Teaching staff: 45.5 (on an FTE basis)
- Grades: 9–12
- Average class size: 23
- Student to teacher ratio: 16.5 to 1
- Campus: Urban
- Colors: Blue and White
- Nickname: OLP
- Team name: Pilots
- Accreditation: Western Association of Schools and Colleges
- School fees: $475
- Tuition: $19,000 (2018–2019)
- Website: http://www.aolp.org

Academy of Our Lady of Peace (locally called "OLP"), is a Catholic high school for young women started by the Sisters of St. Joseph of Carondelet (CSJ). OLP is located in the Roman Catholic Diocese of San Diego. Though the school itself is Catholic, the student body represents different religious, racial and social backgrounds, and serves the communities of San Diego County and Tijuana, Mexico. Its local partner, or 'brother school', is Saint Augustine High School for young men, commonly called "Saints".

== History ==
Founded in 1882, OLP is the oldest high school in San Diego. The school was actually co-ed until the late 1890s, when it became a women-only school. Its popularity grew, and in 1925 the Sisters of St. Joseph purchased the Vandruff Estate, built in 1916 and called Villa Montemar, in what is now San Diego's North Park area. Those 20 acres (81,000 m^{2}) of land overlooking Mission Valley originally was host to spacious gardens, a swimming pool, an observatory, a chapel and three large buildings (two that served as residences and one for a scientific laboratory). Later, these properties were converted into classrooms, a small music building and the current library.

The Holy Family Event Center replaced the swimming pool in 1997, and plays host to the academy's sporting events, physical education classes and school assemblies. The school gained national attention when it was featured in the 2000 film Bring It On starring Kirsten Dunst, an episode of SciFi's The Invisible Man, and for part of the TV series Veronica Mars.

The academy has received Blue Ribbon School of Excellence Award each year it has entered the evaluatory contest: 1988–1989, 1992–1993, and 1999–2000. In 2008-2009 the school's Academic Decathlon Team finished in second place overall among all San Diego County schools participating.

In 2006 the academy strained its relationship with the surrounding neighborhood by advancing an expansion plan while in violation of its current conditional use permit. On Sept. 24, 2007, Code Compliance Judge Mandel Himelstein ruled that the academy must cut enrollment by more than 100 students, reduce staff, and pay more than $100,000 in fines and court costs for violating City of San Diego building codes. The academy was told to reduce enrollment to 640 students and cut staff from 60 to 45 by July 1, 2008; penalties for failure to comply could reach a maximum of $250,000.

In 2009 OLP sued the City of San Diego in Federal court, charging that its plans to further its expansion by the demolition of two historically designated homes have been rejected by the City in a manner that violates their freedom of religious expression. The trial concluded October 19, 2012, with the jury ruling in favor of Academy of Our Lady of Peace, awarding $1,111,622.00 in monetary damages. The parties continued to negotiate, and in April 2013 the academy reached a settlement with the City of San Diego, ending the dispute between the school and the city. "The city has agreed to pay to relocate two homes on OLP’s campus while razing a third by May 1, 2014, clearing the way for construction. The settlement also includes provisions limiting the total cost of all permits and inspections to $100,000, fast-track all permits for completion and a $500,000 cash settlement."

Groundbreaking on a new on-campus parking facility began May 30, 2014 and the two level parking structure was finished in Spring 2015. The parking structure allows for 104 off-street parking spaces, significantly freeing up congestion of the city streets.

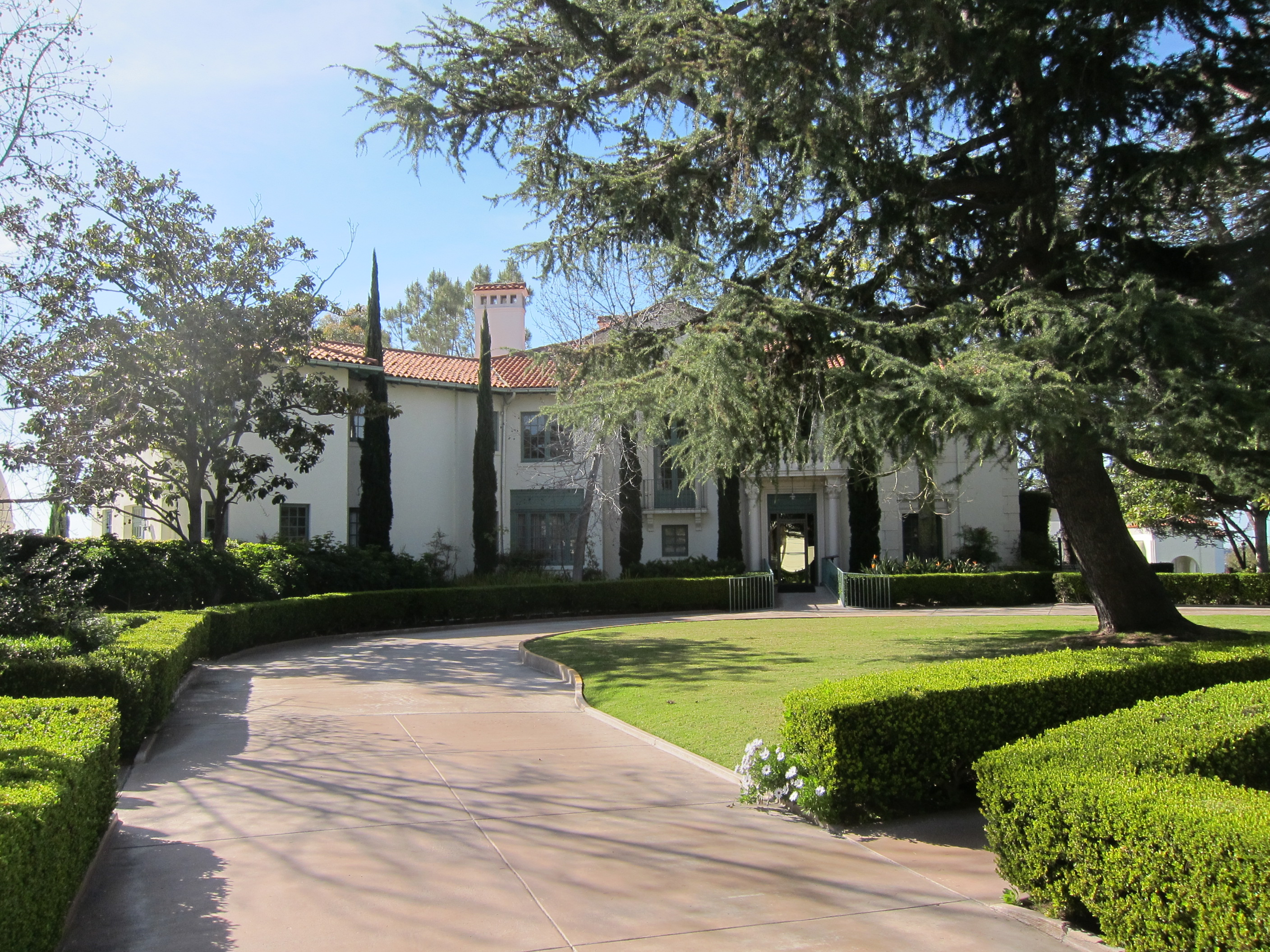
The school in 2011

== See also ==
- Primary and secondary schools in San Diego, California
