= Saint Joseph Academy (San Marcos, California) =

Private, coeducational school in San Marcos, California, United States

St. Joseph Academy
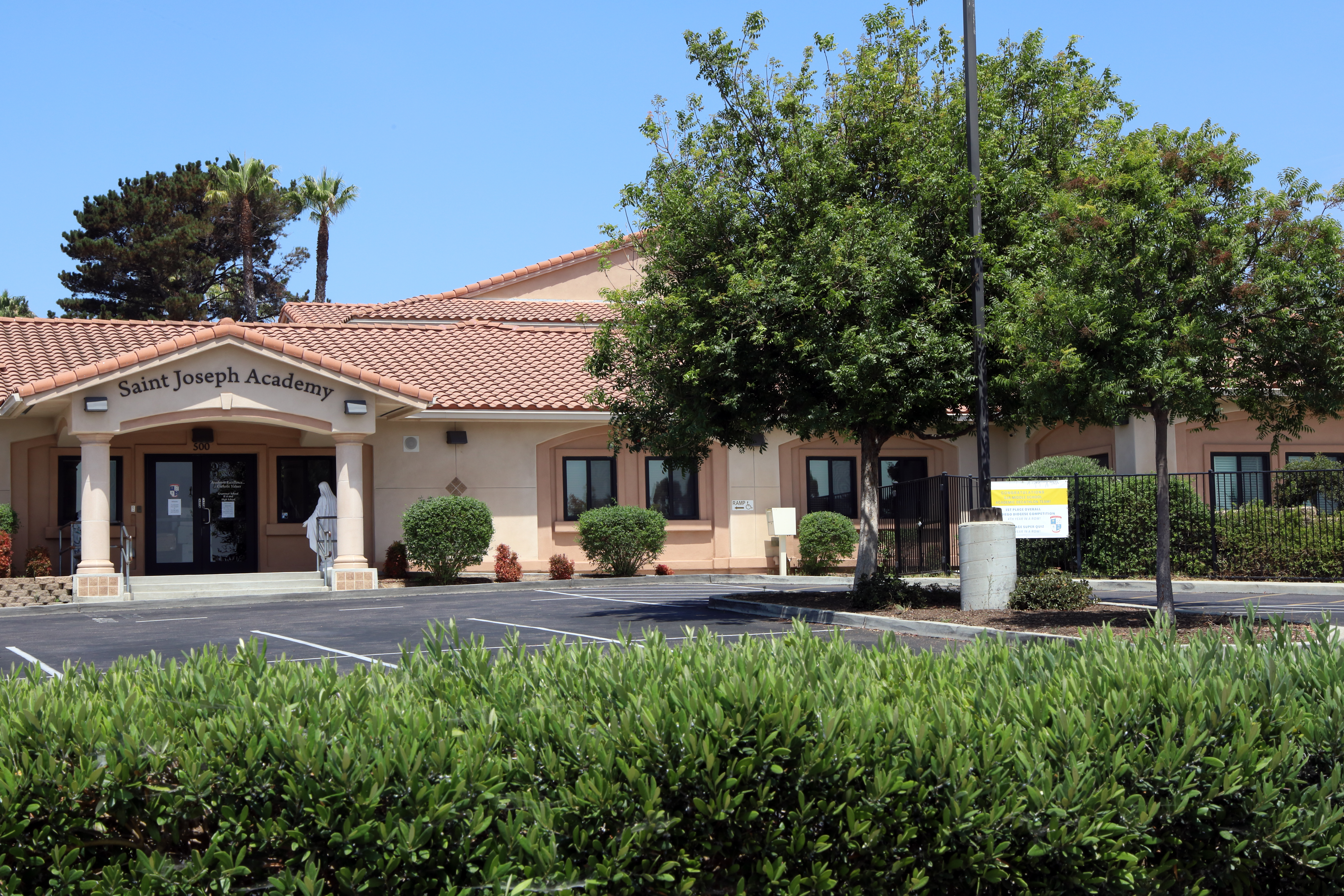

Location
- 500 Las Flores Drive; San Marcos, (San Diego County), California 92078; United States; 33°8′50″N 117°12′19″W

Information
- Former name: Sierra Madre Academy
- Type: Private, Coeducational
- Religious affiliation: Roman Catholic
- Patron saint: St. Joseph
- Established: 1995
- President: Mark Kalpakgian
- Teaching staff: 19.0 (on an FTE basis)
- Grades: K–12
- Average class size: 30
- Student to teacher ratio: 16.8
- Colors: Blue, Gold and White
- Athletics: Men's football, Men's cross-country, Women's volleyball, Men's basketball, Men's soccer, Women's basketball, Men's baseball, Men's volleyball, Women's softball
- Athletics conference: CIF San Diego
- Mascot: Crusader
- Team name: Crusaders
- Accreditation: Western Association of Schools and Colleges
- Tuition: 2025-26: $9,088(K–8); $14,337 (9–12)
- Athletic Director: Joseph Murray
- Website: www.saintjosephacademy.org

St. Joseph Academy is a traditional Roman Catholic K–12 school located in San Marcos, CA. Its stated mission is "to transform human society through the most effective means possible, namely through training the youth in faith, reason, and virtue". The school is operated independent of the Roman Catholic Diocese of San Diego and offers a complete K-12 education. The school is accredited by the Western Association of Schools and Colleges.

== Overview ==
St. Joseph Academy's curriculum is taught using the Classical Christian education model, which emphasizes biblical teachings and incorporates the Trivium teaching method. On national standardized achievement tests, students score between the 85th and 99th percentile, and K–12 grade-equivalent scores are, on average, about three grade levels higher than the national mean. The K-5 primary grades are taught using the Spalding Method. Primary grade teachers receive formal training in this method, which is child-centered and focuses on the physical and mental well-being of students.

Grades 6-8 emphasizes fundamental skill acquisition; accordingly, teachers employ a direct approach to instruction so that the student clearly understands the goal of each lesson at its beginning. Moreover, a special emphasis is placed on the Socratic Method of learning where teachers skillfully question students to educe or draw forth student insight, analysis and expression. In addition, a unique feature of its middle school curriculum is the teaching of Latin, a practice now uncommon among Catholic primary schools.

St. Joseph Academy's High School's college preparatory curriculum is approved by the University of California and meets its entrance requirements. In addition, the high school offers an in-house SAT training course.

In addition to a wide offering of extracurricular clubs, its recognized athletic program includes membership in the North County Parochial League for middle school and the California Interscholastic Federation (C.I.F.). for high school. Athletic activities include tackle football, flag football, volleyball, basketball, soccer, golf, and track.

St. Joseph Academy is centered around its stated fidelity to the Magisterium of the Catholic Church. Aside from Religion being taught at every grade level, the entire school attends weekly Mass. Priests from the Miles Christi religious order hear weekly confessions and offer students spiritual direction.

== History ==
In 1995, two Catholic mothers established a K-12 school in North County (San Diego area) that would integrate both religious and academic formation. After obtaining approval from then San Diego Bishop Robert Brom, they founded Sierra Madre Academy in a small commercial building in San Marcos. In September 2008, it was renamed Saint Joseph Academy when it moved to its new, larger campus.

During its first year, 25 students attended in grades one through nine. There were four full-time paid teachers, two volunteers teachers, a volunteer secretary, and a principal who also served as teacher. In the second year, the school tripled its enrollment to 77 students. In 1997, to accommodate more students, the school leased additional space at another commercial building across a vacant field from the original school building to create at an "upper campus". The school housed grades K-3 in its original space, the "lower campus," while the upper campus was home to grades 4-12. Each year, more space was leased at the upper campus until there was a classroom for each grade and one computer classroom. In 2000, to expand its athletic and recreational opportunities, the school negotiated a lease for a vacant 3-acre (12,000 m^{2}) lot between the two campuses.

In the 2004-05 school year, enrollment reached 189 students. Shortly thereafter, enrollment reached maximum capacity of 200 students, which prompted the need for an expanded campus.

== New campus ==
On September 10, 2008, St. Joseph Academy opened a new campus located on Las Flores Drive in San Marcos, California. The new, 15,000-square-foot (1,400 m^{2}), 13-classroom campus allowed the school to increase enrollment to 350 students. In 2015, after receiving approval from city officials, the school embarked on a capital campaign to raise funds for Phase II of its campus, which will include science labs, additional classrooms, and a full-size gymnasium.

== Advisory board ==
St. Joseph Academy's Advisory Board includes, President, Terry Barber.
