= Ultimate Hustler =

- Title card
- Genre: Reality television
- Written by: Datari Turner
- Presented by: Damon Dash
- Country of origin: United States
- Original language: English
- No. of seasons: 1
- No. of episodes: 10

Production
- Executive producers: Kenny Hull; Robyn Lattaker-Johnson Datari Turner
- Producer: Jashod Belcher
- Production locations: New York City, New York, United States
- Editors: Dan Katz; Andrew Mendelson
- Camera setup: Trevor Adams
- Running time: 60 minutes
- Production company: Huck Films

Original release
- Release: October 4 – December 13, 2005

Ultimate Hustler is an American reality show broadcast on BET created by Datari Turner. The show featured Damon Dash training 16 aspiring entrepreneurs, both men and women, who compete for an executive position to work for Damon Dash. Based on its premise, the show has been described as a hip-hop version of The Apprentice.

== Lifetime ==
The program was first broadcast on October 4, 2005, with the final episode on December 13, 2005, with Brian Rikuda winning the top prize. The project was helmed by Showrunner/Director Kenny Hull and produced by his company Huck Films.

== Hustlers ==
- Jennifer Bayer
- Christopher C.
- Matthew McGreevy
- Laurence Chandler
- Tichanda Daniels
- Shola Adisa-Farrar
- Ray Freeman
- Kwame Gates
- Jermel H., a.k.a. "Sharp"
- Will L.
- Brian Rikuda (Winner)
- Dashawn Taylor
- Kira Vince
- Dominic Sauer
- Alphonzo Terrell
- Ashley Williams
- Tarisha Brown, a.k.a. "Seven"
