= Shola Adisa-Farrar =

American singer (born 1985)

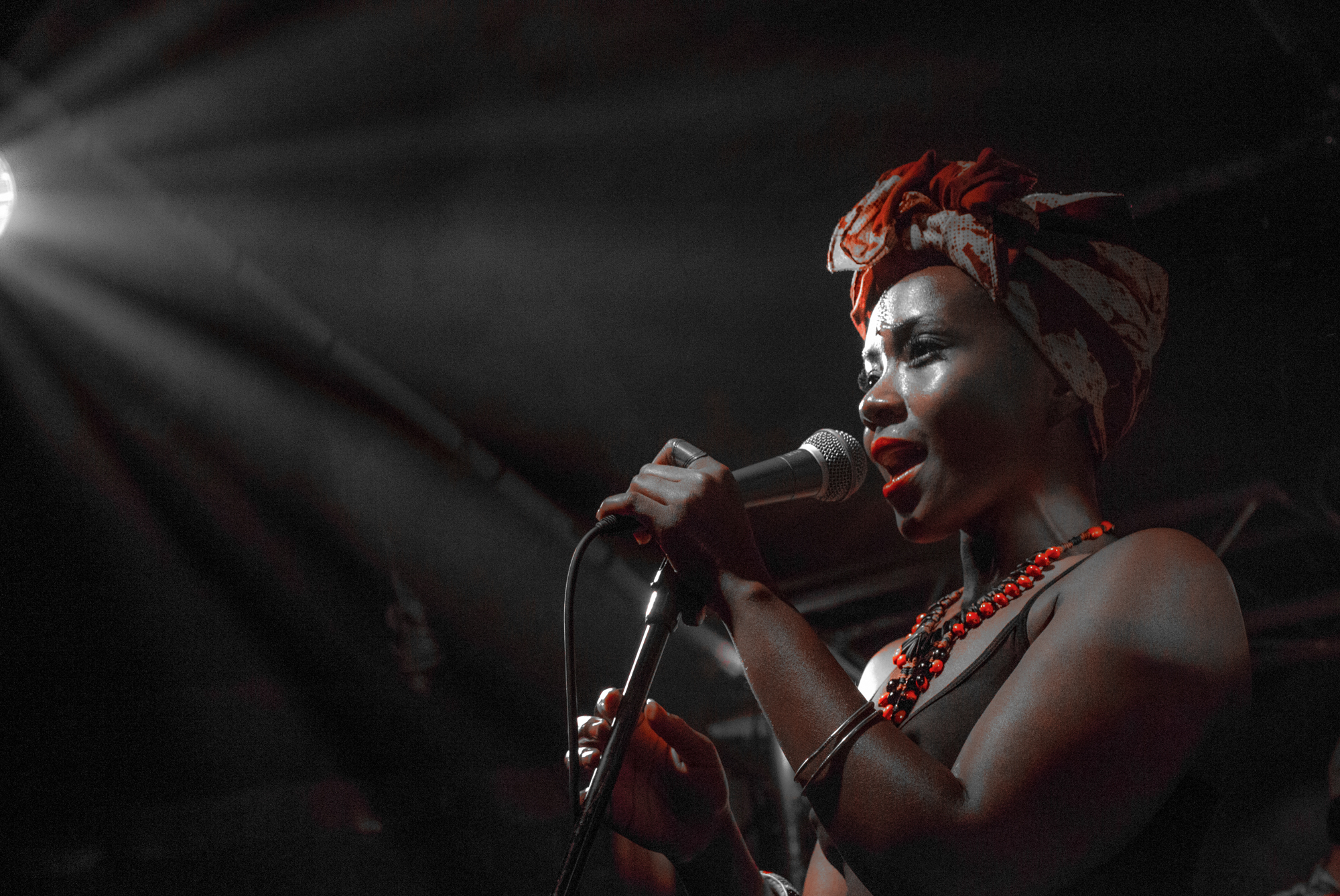
- Shola Adisa-Farrar

Background information
- Born: Shola Adisa-Farrar; Oakland, California, United States
- Origin: Jamaica
- Genres: Jazz, reggae, soul
- Occupations: Singer, songwriter, actress
- Instrument: Vocals
- Years active: 2011–present
- Label: Hot Casa Records
- Website: www.sholaadisafarrar.com

Shola Adisa-Farrar (born January 23) is an American singer and actress of Jamaican descent, currently residing in Paris, France. Adisa-Farrar has performed internationally, and she works as a US Music Ambassador with the US Embassy, Africa Regional Services Department in Paris.

== Early life ==
Shola Adisa-Farrar was born in Oakland, California. She is the daughter of Jamaican professor and writer, Opal Palmer Adisa. Adisa-Farrar began singing and acting at the age of eight when she attended The American Youth Conservatory Theatre in San Francisco. In high school, she was a member of the Oakland Youth Chorus. Adisa-Farrar attended Fordham University in New York City, where she majored in music and earned her degree in 2006.

== Career ==
In 2006, Shola Adisa-Farrar appeared in seven out of ten episodes of BET's Ultimate Hustler reality TV show featuring Damon Dash.

Adisa-Farrar moved to Paris at the beginning of 2011 and there she began her musical career. After singing at Le Reservoir in Paris on Sundays for the Jazz brunch, she was approached by Hot Casa Record's co-founder Julien Lebrun to create an album. Lebrun connected her to French pianist Florian Pellissier, and the two spent the next two years composing and creating what would be Shola's debut album, Lost Myself. The album reached the number-one position on iTunes France jazz album chart in the first week after release.

The hit song from the album "Evolution" has played on airwaves in France, US and the United Kingdom and appears on Episode 6 of Spike Lee's Netflix Series She's Gotta Have It.

== Discography ==
=== Albums ===
- Lost Myself (2016)
