= Palladium (disambiguation) =

Palladium is a chemical element with symbol Pd and atomic number 46.

Palladium, The Palladium or Paladium may also refer to:

== Religion and mythology ==
- Palladium (classical antiquity), a statue that protected Troy and later Rome
- Palladium (protective image), an object believed to protect a city or nation from harm, a meaning generalized from the Trojan Palladium

== Arts and entertainment ==
=== Television ===
- Palladium, a Winx Club character

=== Games ===
- Palladium, a clone of the Arcadia 2001 game console
- Palladium Fantasy Role-Playing Game, by publisher Palladium Books

=== Music ===
==== Groups and concerts ====
- Palladium (Australian band)
- Palladium (British band)
- "Palladium", a stage at the Parachute music festival

==== Albums ====
- Palladium, a 1991 album by Autopsia
- Palladium, a 2022 album by Greyson Chance
- Palladium, a 2021 album by April March and Olivia Jean

==== Songs ====
- "Palladium", a song by Epica from their 2005 album Consign to Oblivion
- "Palladíum", a song by Weather Report from their 1977 album Heavy Weather
- "Palladium", a song by Greyson Chance from their 2022 album Palladium
- "Palladium", a 2002 song by Alan Braxe and Fred Falke
- "Palladium", a song by Brigitte from their 2017 album Nues
- "Palladium", a song by Kacy Hill from their 2020 album Is It Selfish If We Talk About Me Again

== Brands and enterprises ==
- Palladium Books, a game publisher
- Palladium Card, an elite credit card from JPMorgan Chase now branded as J.P. Morgan Reserve Card
- Palladium (company), a French footwear brand
- Aznom Palladium, a full-size luxury vehicle

== Buildings ==
=== United States ===
- Palladium (New York City), a concert hall and later a nightclub in New York City, in the late 1980s and early 1990s
  - Palladium Hall, a dormitory for New York University students located where the nightclub once stood
- Palladium Times Square, an events venue in New York City
- Palladium (St. Louis), former home of the Paradise Club jazz club
- Hollywood Palladium, a theatre in Los Angeles, US
- Palladium at St. Petersburg College, a former church now serving as a theater in St. Petersburg, Florida
- Palladium Ballroom, a dance hall in New York City, that was located above a Rexall Drugstore at the corner of 53rd Street and Broadway in New York City, from 1948 to 1966
- The Palladium at the Center for the Performing Arts, a concert hall in Carmel, Indiana that opened in 2011
- Worcester Palladium, a concert venue in Worcester, Massachusetts

=== Others ===
- Palladium, Llandudno, a former theatre, now a pub, in Wales
- Palladium (Ottawa), a sports arena in Canada, now the Canadian Tire Centre
- Palladium (Prague), a shopping centre in the Czech Republic
- Palladium (Stockholm), a cinema in the Swedish capital
- Palladium Cinema, Lichfield, a former cinema in Lichfield, England
- The Palladium (Dubai), a 35-floor mixed use residential and office tower
- The Palladium Niteclub, a night club in Christchurch, New Zealand from 1986 to 1998
- London Palladium, a theatre in London, UK, owned by Andrew Lloyd Webber

== Computing and technology ==
- Palladium, the codename for Next-Generation Secure Computing Base, a trusted computing initiative begun by Microsoft
- PALLADIUM, a 1958 Central Intelligence Agency Directorate of Science & Technology program to study and interfere with Soviet radar
- Cadence Palladium, a hardware accelerated emulator for functional verification of RTL, by Cadence Design Systems

== See also ==
- Andrea Palladio (1508–1580), Italian Renaissance architect
- Palladian architecture, a style of architecture created by Andrea Palladio
- Pd (disambiguation)
- Isotopes of palladium
