= Val-Royal =

Val-Royal or variation, may refer to:

- Val Royal (1996–2008), a French thoroughbred racehorse
- Groupe Val-Royal, the parent company of renovation centre chain Réno-Dépôt
- Val-Royal station, the former name of the commuter rail station Bois-Franc station

== See also ==
- Royal (disambiguation)
- Val (disambiguation)
- Valreale (Italian: Royal Vale), an alternate name for Brajičić, Croatia; see List of Italian exonyms in Dalmatia
- Vale Royal (disambiguation)
- Royal Valley (disambiguation)
- Royal Gorge (disambiguation)
