= Royal =

Royal may refer to:

== People ==
- Royal (name), a list of people with either the surname or given name
- A member of a royal family or royalty

== Places ==
=== United States ===
- Royal, Arkansas, an unincorporated community
- Royal, Illinois, a village
- Royal, Iowa, a city
- Royal, Missouri, an unincorporated community
- Royal, Nebraska, a village
- Royal, Franklin County, North Carolina, an unincorporated area
- Royal, Utah, a ghost town
- Royal, West Virginia, an unincorporated community
- Royal Gorge, on the Arkansas River in Colorado
- Royal Township (disambiguation)

=== Elsewhere ===
- Mount Royal, a hill in Montreal, Canada
- Royal Canal, Dublin, Ireland
- Royal National Park, New South Wales, Australia

== Arts, entertainment, and media ==
- Royal (Jesse Royal album), 2021
- Royal (Ayo album), 2020
- The Royal, a British medical drama television series
- The Royal Magazine, a monthly British literary magazine published between 1898 and 1939
- The Raja Saab, working title Royal, a 2025 Indian romantic horror film by Maruthi
- Royal Tenenbaum, protagonist of the 2001 film The Royal Tenenbaums, played by Gene Hackman
- "Royal", a song by Deftones from their 2010 album Diamond Eyes

== Brands and enterprises ==
- Royal (restaurant), former Michelin starred restaurant in The Hague, Netherlands
- Royal Tru, a soda brand owned by the Coca-Cola Company
- Chrysler Royal, an automobile produced from 1937 to 1942 and 1946 to 1950
- Dodge Royal, a style of the 1955 Dodge automobile
- Royal Baking Powder Company
- Royal Cinema, Toronto, Canada
- Royal Theatre (disambiguation)
- Theatre Royal (disambiguation)
- Royal.io, a US-based music rights platform
- Royal Opera House, London, UK, better known as Covent Garden
- Royal Typewriter Company, a leading typewriter company

== Military ==
- No. 32 Squadron RAF, or the Royal Squadron
- Régiment Royal, a French Army regiment established in 1656

== Schools ==
- Royal Agricultural University, Cirencester, Gloucestershire, UK
- Royal College, Colombo, Sri Lanka
- Royal College of Art, London, UK
- Royal Grammar School Worcester, UK
- Royal High School, Edinburgh, Scotland, UK
- Royal Military College, Duntroon, Australian Capital Territory, Australia
- Royal University of Bhutan
- Royal University of Ireland

== Sports ==
- Kansas City Royals, a major league baseball team founded in 1969
- Royal '95, a Surinamese association football club.

== Other uses ==
- Royal (sail), a small sail on square rigged sailing ships
- Royal, a traditional size of paper
- Royal Medal, awarded annually by the Royal Society
- Koninklijk (Dutch for 'royal'), honorary title given to certain companies and non-profit organisations in the Netherlands and Belgium

== See also ==
- Royals (disambiguation)
- Royalty (disambiguation)
- Royal Bank (disambiguation)
- Royal Gorge (disambiguation)
- Royal Hospital (disambiguation)
- Royal institute (disambiguation)
- Royal Library (disambiguation)
- Royal Valley (disambiguation)
- Vale Royal (disambiguation)
- Royale (disambiguation)
- Royall (disambiguation)
