= Fort Brooks =

Fort Brooks, in northwest Clay County, Kansas, was located three miles west of Clifton, Kansas. Built on the north bank of the Republican River in August or September 1864, it was named for George D. Brooks. Brooks, an ensign in the Shirley County Militia, owned the farm on which the fort was located. Capt. Isaac M. Schooley, the militia commander, was also the fort's commander.

The area surrounding the fort was generally flat, providing an unobstructed view to the north, eat and west. Possibly the view south, across the river, was obstructed by brush. Fort Brooks was built to protect the area settlers against Indian attacks, of which there were many. Before the fort was built, the citizens used Fort Clifton for protection and for a time many took refuge at Clay Center, Kansas, where a temporary stockade consisting of wagons was built.

The Shirley County militia received twenty muskets and sixty boxes of ammunition from Fort Riley. Fort Brooks ended up being a controversial structure. A number of settlers argued the site chosen could not be well defended if Indians hid in the brush across the river from it and fired upon it from there. In a meeting concerning the planning of the fort, an angry confrontation erupted and a number of settlers decided to take their chances with Indian attacks on their own.

At least one log blockhouse was built at Fort Brooks. There is disagreement about whether more than one structure was built. Once constructed, Fort Brooks seems to have been garrisoned only a week and two or three families took refuge there all winter. In November 1864 the settlers requested Fort Riley's commander send soldiers to help guard the area. However, no troops were sent.

Finally, the Indian problems ceased. At that time, Fort Brooks was no longer used, except by George Brooks, who used it for stables.
