= Vining =

Vining is the name of several places in the United States. It may refer to:

- Vining, Iowa
- Vining, Kansas
- Vining, Minnesota

== See also ==
- Vining (surname)
- Vinings (disambiguation)
