= Vining (surname) =

Vining is a surname. Notable people with the name include:

- Daniel Vining Jr. (born 1944), American demographer
- Ebenezer Vining Bodwell (1827–1889), Ontario businessman and political figure
- Elizabeth Gray Vining, American librarian and author
- Frederick Vining (1790–1871), English actor
- George Vining (1824–1875), English actor
- John Vining (1758–1802), American lawyer and politician
- Ken Vining (born 1974), American baseball player
- Mike Vining (coach) (born 1944), American basketball coach
- Mike Vining (born 1950), sergeant major in the United States Army
- Robert L. Vining Jr. (1931–2022), American judge
- Robyn Vining (born 1976), Wisconsin politician
- Steve Vining, American musician
- Samuel J. Vining (1864–1914), American politician

== See also ==
- Vining (disambiguation)
