= Valley of the Kings (disambiguation) =

Valley of the Kings is a valley in Egypt holding the tombs of many kings and nobles.

Valley of the Kings may also refer to:

- Valley of the Kings (Tibet), tumuli believed to contain the tombs of Tibetan kings in Tibet
- Valley of the Kings (film), a 1954 adventure film made by Metro-Goldwyn-Mayer
- Valley of the Kings (1964), written by Jean Scott Rogers
- Valley of the Kings (EP), a 1997 EP by Gamma Ray
- "Valley of the Kings", a song by Blue Murder from the 1989 album Blue Murder
- "Valley of the Kings", a song by Hagar Schon Aaronson Shrieve from the 1984 album Through the Fire

== See also ==
- In the Valley of the Kings, a 2009 short story collection by Terrence E. Holt
- King's Valley
- King's Valley II
- Kings Valley, Oregon
- Royal Valley (disambiguation)
