= National Register of Historic Places listings in Cloud County, Kansas =

Location of Cloud County in Kansas

This is a list of the National Register of Historic Places listings in Cloud County, Kansas.

This is intended to be a complete list of the properties and districts on the National Register of Historic Places in Cloud County, Kansas, United States. The locations of National Register properties and districts for which the latitude and longitude coordinates are included below, may be seen in a map.

There are 10 properties and districts listed on the National Register in the county.

This National Park Service list is complete through NPS recent listings posted May 1, 2026.

== Current listings ==
	Name on the Register	Image	Date listed	Location	City or town	Description
1	Bankers Loan and Trust Company Building	Bankers Loan and Trust Company Building	November 9, 1977 (#77000576)	101 E. 6th and 517 Broadway; 39°34′18″N 97°39′31″W	Concordia	
2	Brown Grand Opera House	Brown Grand Opera House	July 26, 1973 (#73000747)	310 W. 6th St. 39°34′17″N 97°39′46″W	Concordia	
3	Clyde School	Clyde School	January 22, 2009 (#08001348)	620 Broadway St. 39°35′25″N 97°24′11″W	Clyde	
4	County Line Bowstring	County Line Bowstring	January 4, 1990 (#89002192)	Over West Creek, northwest of Hollis; 39°39′12″N 97°34′21″W	Hollis	
5	Glasco Downtown Historic District	Glasco Downtown Historic District	November 17, 2002 (#02001307)	Roughly along Main St. from Railroad Ave. to Fisher St., and along Railroad Ave. and Fisher St. between Main and Buffalo Sts. 39°21′40″N 97°50′23″W	Glasco	
6	Nazareth Convent and Academy	Nazareth Convent and Academy	January 18, 1973 (#73000748)	13th and Washington Sts. 39°33′49″N 97°39′38″W	Concordia	
7	Pott's Ford Bridge	Pott's Ford Bridge	January 4, 1990 (#89002173)	Over Solomon River, southeast of Glasco; 39°21′01″N 97°51′15″W	Glasco	
8	Republican River Pegram Truss	Republican River Pegram Truss	January 4, 1990 (#89002190)	Route 795 over the Republican River; 39°35′46″N 97°34′16″W	Concordia	
9	Union Pacific Railroad Depot	Union Pacific Railroad Depot	January 21, 2004 (#03001465)	300 Washington St. 39°34′24″N 97°39′41″W	Concordia	
10	Charles W. Van De Mark House	Charles W. Van De Mark House	July 5, 1985 (#85001492)	504 Washington; 39°35′27″N 97°24′01″W	Clyde	

== See also ==
- List of National Historic Landmarks in Kansas
- National Register of Historic Places listings in Kansas
