= Louis Mollier =

Rev. Louis Marie Mollier (29 October 1846 in Chambéry, Savoie, France – 10 February 1911 in Clyde, Cloud County, Kansas) was a priest of the Roman Catholic Church who served in the pioneer regions of Kansas, United States, from 1874 to his death in 1911. He was ordained 4 April 1873 by Rt. Rev. Louis M. Fink D.D. at Topeka, Kansas and took positions as a missionary priest of northwest Kansas and pastor of Saint Joseph for 36 years.

His first assignment after his 1874 ordination was to the parish at St. Joseph, Kansas. It was from this base that Mollier traveled by horse to communities as distant as 120 miles. Parish histories of Delphos, Glasco, Beloit, Tipton, Osborne, Cawker City, Downs, and Norton in central Kansas cite the early services that Mollier performed in their communities before the parishes were formed.

Mollier provided spiritual guidance to the villages as they were formed and advised on the establishment of new parishes as the communities grew. Although he is credited with building churches in these communities, it is more accurate that his influence as one closely involved with the pioneer and territorial residents was recognized by the Diocese of Concordia in establishing new parishes as needed.
