= Theatre Royal =

Theatre Royal may refer to:

== Theatres ==
=== Australia ===
- Theatre Royal, Adelaide, South Australia
- Theatre Royal, Ballarat, Victoria
- Theatre Royal, Brisbane, Queensland
- Theatre Royal, Castlemaine, Victoria
- Theatre Royal, Hobart, Tasmania
- Theatre Royal, Melbourne, Victoria
- Theatre Royal Sydney, New South Wales
- Theatre Royal and Metropole Hotel, Perth, Western Australia

=== Belgium ===
- Théâtre Royal de la Monnaie, Brussels
- Théâtre Royal du Parc, Brussels

=== Canada ===
- Theatre Royal, Barkerville, British Columbia

=== France ===
- Théâtre Royal de Bourbon, Paris, destroyed in 1660

=== Ireland ===
- Theatre Royal, Cork
- Theatre Royal, Dublin
- Theatre Royal, Waterford
- Theatre Royal, Wexford

=== New Zealand ===
- Theatre Royal, Christchurch, former name of the Isaac Theatre Royal
- Theatre Royal, Nelson

=== United Kingdom ===
- Theatre Royal, Aldershot, Aldershot, built in 1891 and demolished in 1959
- Theatre Royal, Aston, Birmingham, later Alpha Television
- Theatre Royal, Barnwell, Cambridge
- Theatre Royal, Bath, Somerset
- Theatre Royal, Birmingham (1774–1956; so named from 1807)
- Theatre Royal, Brighton
- Theatre Royal, Bristol
- Theatre Royal, Bury St Edmunds
- Theatre Royal, Cardiff, later known as Prince of Wales Theatre, Cardiff
- Theatre Royal, Covent Garden, London later Royal Opera House Covent Garden
- Theatre Royal, Drury Lane, London
- Theatre Royal, Dumfries
- Theatre Royal, Edinburgh
- Theatre Royal, Exeter
- Theatre Royal, Glasgow
- Theatre Royal, Goole
- Theatre Royal, Gravesend
- Theatre Royal, Hanley, Stoke-on-Trent (opened 1852, rebuilt 1871, 1887, 1894, 1951, closed 2000)
- Theatre Royal, Haymarket, London
- Theatre Royal, Hyde, Hyde, Greater Manchester (opened 1902, closed 1992)
- Theatre Royal, Lincoln, England
- Theatre Royal, Lichfield, former theatre on the site of the later Adelphi Cinema, Lichfield
- Theatre Royal, Margate, Kent
- Theatre Royal, Manchester, former theatre - now used as Royale nightclub
- Theatre Royal, Newcastle, Newcastle upon Tyne
- Theatre Royal, Northampton, later Royal & Derngate
- Theatre Royal, Norwich, Norfolk
- Theatre Royal, Nottingham
- Theatre Royal, Plymouth, Devon
- Theatre Royal, Portsmouth
- Theatre Royal, St Helens
- Theatre Royal Stratford East, Stratford, London
- Theatre Royal, Wakefield
- Theatre Royal, Windsor, Berkshire
- York Theatre Royal, York

== Other uses ==
- Theatre Royal (Australian TV series), a Queensland/Australian television series
- Theatre Royal (film), a 1943 British comedy film
- Theatre Royal (1955 TV series), a British/American television series

== See also ==
- Theatre Royal disaster
- Teatro Real, a major opera house in Madrid
- Teatro Regio (disambiguation)
- Royal Theatre (disambiguation)
