= Bibliothèque Royale =

Bibliothèque Royale 'Royal library' may refer to:

- Bibliothèque Royale de Belgique, Royal Library of Belgium
- Bibliothèque du Roi, France, the predecessor of the Bibliothèque nationale de France

== See also ==
- Royal Library (disambiguation)
