= Fort Clifton =

Fort Clifton may refer to:

- Fort Clifton (Kansas), a frontier fort in Kansas
- Fort Clifton (Virginia), a Confederate fort in Colonial Heights, Virginia
