= St. Joseph, Kansas =

Unincorporated community in Cloud County, Kansas

- Unincorporated community
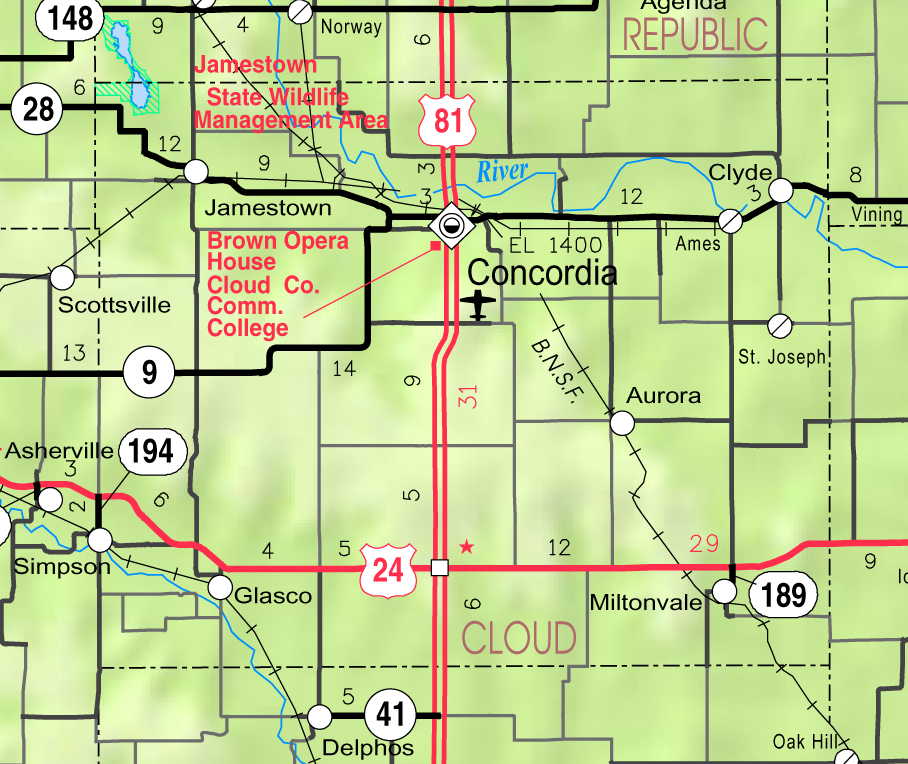
- KDOT map of Cloud County (legend)

- Location within Kansas Location within the United States
- Coordinates: 39°30′35″N 97°24′22″W
- Country: United States
- State: Kansas
- County: Cloud
- Founded: 1874
- Elevation: 1,375 ft (419 m)
- Time zone: UTC-6 (CST)
  - Summer (DST): UTC-5 (CDT)
- Area code: 785
- FIPS code: 20-62325
- GNIS ID: 473344

St. Joseph is an unincorporated community in Cloud County, Kansas, United States. It is located 5.5 miles south of Clyde.

== History ==
St. Joseph was founded after 1874 by its first Catholic pastor, Father Louis-Marie Mollier. Its inhabitants were originally predominantly Roman Catholics of French American heritage.

St. Joseph had a post office between 1878 and 1901.

== Education ==
The community is served by Clifton-Clyde USD 224 public school district.

== Notable people ==
- Louis Mollier (1846-1911), Roman Catholic priest from 1874 to his death who provided services and guidance to parishioners throughout northwestern Kansas.
