= Royal Hotel =

Royal Hotel may refer to:

== Hotels ==
=== In Australia ===
- Royal Hotel, Maryborough, Queensland
- Royal Hotel, Birdsville, Queensland
- Royal Hotel, Bathurst, New South Wales
- Royal Hotel, Cooma, New South Wales
- Royal Hotel, Perth, Western Australia

=== In the United Kingdom ===
==== In England ====
- Royal Hotel, Bath, Somerset
- Royal Hotel, Birmingham, West Midlands
- Royal Hotel, Great Yarmouth, Norfolk
- Royal Hotel, Norwich, Norfolk
- Royal Hotel, Scarborough, North Yorkshire
- Royal Hotel, Weymouth, Dorset
- Royal Hotel, Whitby, North Yorkshire

==== In Wales ====
- Royal Hotel, Cardiff

=== In other locations ===
- Royal Hotel (Oran), Algeria
- Royal Hotel Seoul (Seoul), South Korea
- Royal Hotel (Honey Harbour), Ontario, Canada
- Radisson Collection Royal Hotel, Copenhagen, Denmark, originally the SAS Royal Hotel
- Le Royal Hotel (Amman), Jordan
- Hotel Ukraina, Moscow, previously the Radisson Royal Hotel
- The Royal Hotel (South Africa), Riebeek Kasteel, Western Cape, South Africa, a historic hotel

== Other uses ==
- The Royal Hotel (film), a 2023 Australian thriller film

== See also ==
- Grand Hôtel (Stockholm), Stockholm, Sweden
- Les Cours Mont-Royal, Montreal, Quebec, Canada
- Hotel (disambiguation)
- Royal (disambiguation)
- Royal George Hotel (disambiguation)
- Hotel Royal (disambiguation)
