= Royal Opera =

Royal Opera or Royal Opera House may refer to:

- Khedivial Opera House, Cairo, Egypt; burnt down in 1971
- Royal Swedish Opera, opera house and opera company in Sweden
- L'Opéra of the Palace of Versailles or L'Opéra Royal de Versailles, France
- Opéra Royal de Wallonie, opera house in Liège, Belgium
- Royal Opera House (Mumbai), opera house in India
- Royal Opera House Muscat, opera house in Muscat, Oman
- Royal Opera House, Valletta, opera house in Malta
- Royal Opera House, opera house in Covent Garden, London, home of
  - The Royal Opera, leading opera company in England
- Royal Wanganui Opera House, opera house in New Zealand
- Royal Opera House, Scarborough, England (1876-2004)

Formerly "Royal" opera houses or companies

- Berlin State Opera, Germany: "Royal Opera House", 1843–1918
- Hungarian State Opera House, Budapest: "Hungarian Royal Opera House", 1884–1945?
- Kroll Opera House, Berlin, Germany: "New Royal Opera Theatre", 1895–1924
- Palace Theatre, London, London: "Royal English Opera House", 1891–92
- Teatro dell'Opera di Roma, Italy: "Royal Opera House", 1926–46

== See also ==
- Live at Royal Opera House, 2002 DVD by Björk
- Teatro Real, a major "Royal" opera house in Madrid, closed 1925–1997
- Royal Theatre (disambiguation)
- Theatre Royal (disambiguation)
