= Royalty =

Royalty may refer to:

== Common meanings ==
- monarchs, kings, queens, emperors, empresses, princes, princesses, etc.
- royal family, the immediate family of a king or queen-regnant, and sometimes their extended family
- royalty payment for use of such things as intellectual property, music, or natural resources

== Music ==
- The Royalty (band), a 2005–2013 American rock band
- Royalty Records, a Canadian record label

=== Albums ===
- Royalty (Chris Brown album), 2015
- Royalty (EP), by EarthGang, 2018
- Royalty (mixtape), by Childish Gambino (Donald Glover), 2012
- The Royalty (album), by the Royal Royal, 2012
- The Royalty: La Realeza, by R.K.M & Ken-Y, 2008

=== Songs ===
- "Royalty" (Down with Webster song), 2012
- "Royalty" (XXXTentacion song), 2019
- "Royalty", by Conor Maynard, 2015
- "Royalty", by Nas from The Lost Tapes 2, 2019

== Theatres ==
- Royalty Theatre, a demolished theatre in Soho, London, England
- Royalty Theatre, Glasgow, a demolished theatre in Scotland
- Peacock Theatre, previously the Royalty Theatre, a West End theatre in London

== Other uses ==
- Royalty (grape), a variety of grape
- Royalty, Texas, United States, an unincorporated community
- Royalty Magazine, a British monthly
- The Royalty (TV series), a 1957 British series

== See also ==
- Royal (disambiguation)
- Royals (disambiguation)
- Monarchy (disambiguation)
