= Ames, Kansas =

Unincorporated community in Cloud County, Kansas

- Unincorporated community and CDP
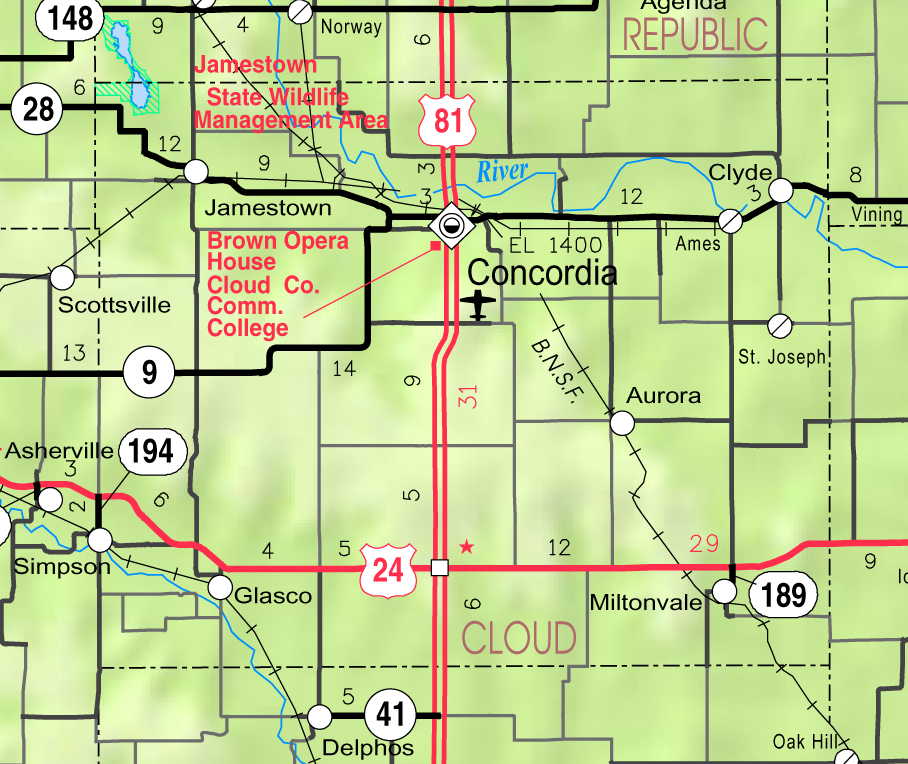
- KDOT map of Cloud County (legend)

- Location within Kansas Location within the United States
- Coordinates: 39°34′10″N 97°26′31″W
- Country: United States
- State: Kansas
- County: Cloud
- Elevation: 1,306 ft (398 m)

Population (2020)
  - Total: 33
- Time zone: UTC-6 (CST)
  - Summer (DST): UTC-5 (CDT)
- Area code: 785
- FIPS code: 20-01725
- GNIS ID: 473350

Ames is an unincorporated community and census-designated place (CDP) in Cloud County, Kansas, United States. As of the 2020 census, the population was 33. It is located three miles southwest of Clyde, next to state highway K-9.

== History ==
Ames was founded in 1883.

A post office was opened in Shirley in 1868 (also known as Elm Creek, it is now part of Shirley Township, averaging a population of 40), but the post office was moved to Ames in 1878 and remained in operation until it was discontinued in 1993.

== Demographics ==
Historical population
Census	Pop.	Note	%±
2020	33		—
U.S. Decennial Census

The 2020 United States census counted 33 people, 14 households, and 8 families in Ames. The population density was 77.5 per square mile (29.9/km^{2}). There were 14 housing units at an average density of 32.9 per square mile (12.7/km^{2}). The racial makeup was 100.0% (33) white or European American (100.0% non-Hispanic white), 0.0% (0) black or African-American, 0.0% (0) Native American or Alaska Native, 0.0% (0) Asian, 0.0% (0) Pacific Islander or Native Hawaiian, 0.0% (0) from other races, and 0.0% (0) from two or more races. Hispanic or Latino of any race was 0.0% (0) of the population.

Of the 14 households, 14.3% had children under the age of 18; 42.9% were married couples living together; 21.4% had a female householder with no spouse or partner present. 42.9% of households consisted of individuals and 28.6% had someone living alone who was 65 years of age or older. The percent of those with a bachelor's degree or higher was estimated to be 0.0% of the population.

36.4% of the population was under the age of 18, 0.0% from 18 to 24, 6.1% from 25 to 44, 36.4% from 45 to 64, and 21.2% who were 65 years of age or older. The median age was 54.5 years. For every 100 females, there were 57.1 males. For every 100 females ages 18 and older, there were 75.0 males.

== Education ==
The community is served by Clifton-Clyde USD 224 public school district.

== See also ==
- Central Branch Union Pacific Railroad
