= Royal Gorge (disambiguation) =

Royal Gorge or variation, may refer to:

- Royal Gorge (Arkansas River), Colorado, USA; a gorge
- Royal Gorge (Missouri), USA; a gap in a ridge
- Royal Gorge Bridge, Cañon City, Colorado, USA; a bridge
- Royal Gorge Boulevard, Cañon City, Colorado, USA
- Royal Gorge (passenger train), Colorado, USA
- Royal Gorge Route Railroad, Cañon City, Colorado, USA; a train
- Royal Gorge Route, Colorado; a line on the Denver and Rio Grande Western Railroad
- Royal Gorge Cross Country Ski Resort, Soda Springs, California, USA
- Royal Gorge Fire (2013), a forest fire in Colorado, USA
- Royal Gorge blazingstar, a flower native to Colorado, USA

== See also ==
- Royal (disambiguation)
- Gorge (disambiguation)
- Royal Valley (disambiguation)
- Vale Royal (disambiguation)
