= Royall =

Royall may refer to:

Surname

- William Royall (settler) (c. 1595–1676), early settler of North Yarmouth, Massachusetts Bay Colony
- Isaac Royall, Jr. (1719–1781), American landowner, gave land for Harvard Law School
- Anne Royall (1769–1854), travel writer and newspaper editor
- William B. Royall (1825–1895), US Army general
- J. Powell Royall (1874–1945), politician in Virginia, USA
- Kenneth Claiborne Royall (1894–1971), US Army general, Secretary of the Army
- Joe Royall (1912–1975), baseball player
- Kenneth Claiborne Royall, Jr. (1918–1999), politician in North Carolina, USA
- Robert V. Royall (born 1934), former US ambassador to Tanzania
- Janet Royall, Baroness Royall of Blaisdon (born 1955), British politician, principal of Somerville College, Oxford
- Paul Royall, BBC journalist

Given name

- Royall Tyler (1757–1826), American jurist and playwright
- Royall T. Wheeler (1810–1864), judge in Texas, USA
- Royall Tyler (historian) (1884–1953), American historian
- Royall T. Moore (1930–2014), American mycologist
- Royall Tyler (academic) (born 1936), scholar and translator of Japanese literature
- Royall H. Switzler (born 1938), politician in Massachusetts, USA

== See also ==
- Royal (disambiguation)
