= Bankers Loan and Trust Company Building (Concordia, Kansas) =

- U.S. National Register of Historic Places
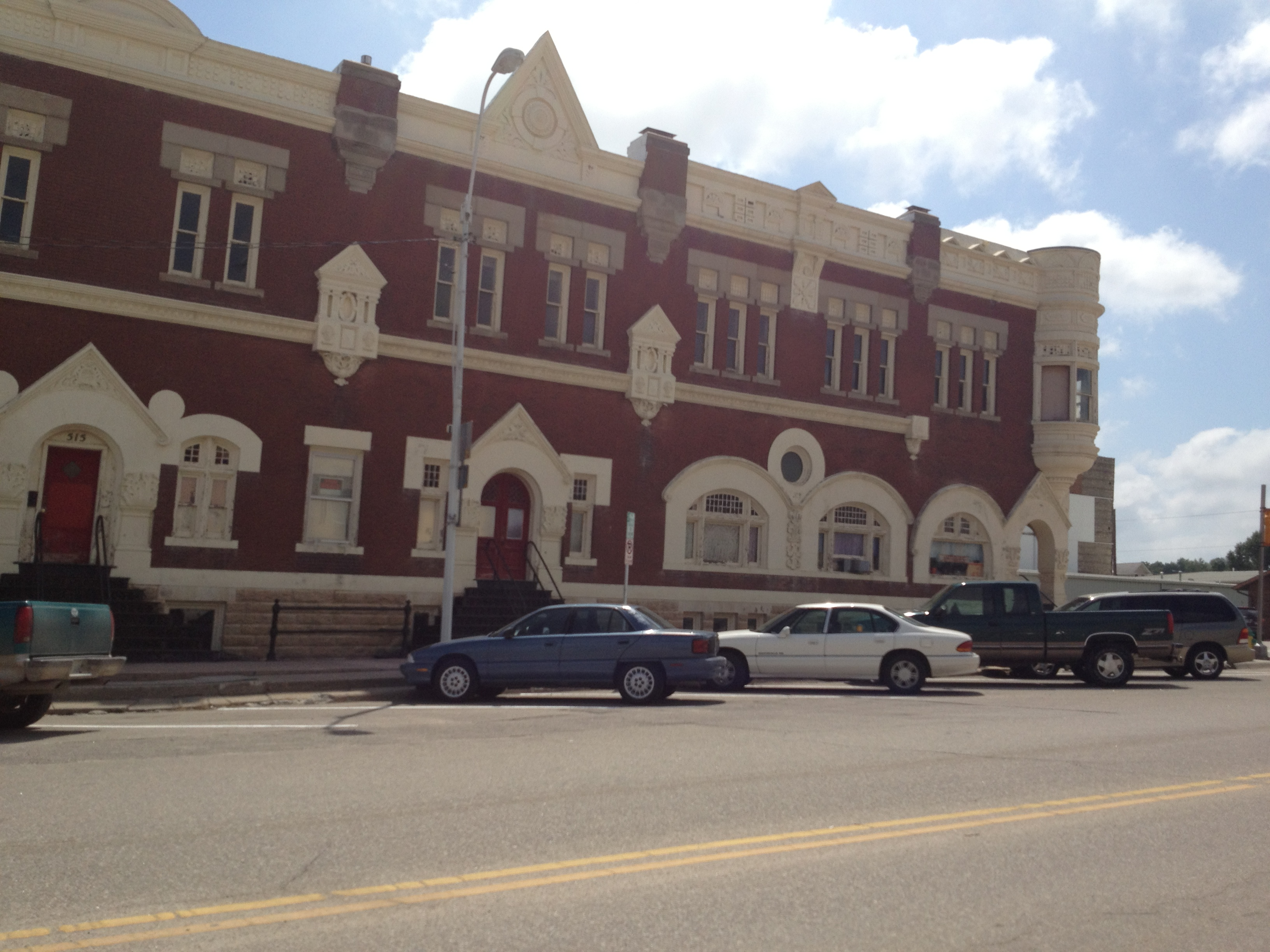
- View from west side, 2013

- Location within Kansas Location within the United States
- Location: Concordia, Kansas
- Coordinates: 39°34′18.37″N 97°39′31.11″W
- Built: 1887
- Architect: W.H. Parsons, C. Howard Parsons
- Architectural style: Queen Anne
- NRHP reference No.: 77000576
- Added to NRHP: November 9, 1977

Bankers Loan and Trust Company Building is a Queen Anne style historic building located in Concordia, Kansas that is listed on the National Register of Historic Places. It is a two-story, Queen Anne-style brick building and was constructed in 1887 and 1888 by W. H. Parsons and C. Howard Parsons of Topeka. The building features a prominent corner entrance with wrap-around stairs and archways. An oriel window is on the second story above the entrance.

== See also ==
- National Register of Historic Places listings in Cloud County, Kansas
