= Royale =

Royale is the French feminine form of royal.

Royale may refer to:

== Places ==
- Île Royale, an island in the Atlantic Ocean off the coast of French Guiana
- Île Royale, a former name of Cape Breton Island, Canada
- Isle Royale, an island in Lake Superior
- Rue Royale, several streets

== Arts, entertainment, and media ==
- "The Royale", an episode from the second season of Star Trek: The Next Generation
- Neo Magazin Royale, a German satirical talk show

== Foods ==
- Custard Royale, a kind of savory custard
- Hamburger Royale or McRoyale, the name of Quarter Pounder in some countries with the metric system

== Transportation ==
=== Motor vehicles ===
- Royale, a variant line of the Oldsmobile 88 automobile
- Bugatti Royale, a luxury automobile
- Daewoo Royale, an automobile manufactured by Daewoo Motors
- Ford Royale, an automobile manufactured by Autolatina in Brazil
- Holden Royale, several different automobiles manufactured by Holden
- REO Motor Car Company, a defunct automobile manufacturer founded by Ransom E. Olds
- Royale Racing Cars, a defunct racecar constructor
- Stutz Royale, a limousine produced by the Stutz Motor Car of America in the 1970s or 1980s
- Vauxhall Royale, a rebadged Opel Senator automobile
  - Vauxhall Royale Coupé, a rebadged Opel Monza

=== Other transportation ===
- MS Royale, a cruise ship operated by several companies, last known as SS Seabreeze
- Royale Airlines, a now defunct small commercial airline

== Other uses ==
- Royale (brand), a Canadian household paper products brand
- Banque Royale, former name of the Banque de France
- Energy Blue, a GUI theme for Windows XP Media Center edition also known as Royale
- La Royale, nickname for the French Navy
- Royale grind, a type of Aggressive Inline Skating grind
- Tillandsia 'Royale', a hybrid cultivar
- Latrice Royale, American drag queen

== See also ==
- Battle Royale (disambiguation)
- Casino Royale (disambiguation)
- Hotel Royal (disambiguation), including Hotel Royale
- Royal (disambiguation)
