= Louise Davis McMahon =

American philanthropist (1873–1966)

- Born: January 18, 1873; St. Joseph, Missouri, U.S.
- Died: February 8, 1966 (aged 93)
- Occupation: Philanthropist
- Children: 1
- Honours: Oklahoma Hall of Fame

Louise Davis McMahon (January 18, 1873 – February 8, 1966) was an American philanthropist who established the McMahon Foundation in Lawton, Oklahoma, to fund cultural, educational, and humanitarian projects. Her work included supporting scholarships, constructing the McMahon Auditorium, and funding the Museum of the Great Plains, contributing significantly to the cultural and social landscape of Comanche County.

== Early life ==
Louise Davis McMahon was born on January 18, 1873, in St. Joseph, Missouri, to John and Martha Reynolds Davis. When McMahon was an infant, the family moved to Clyde, Kansas, where her father established a successful business. Initially residing in a four-room plank house, John Davis eventually prospered through his work trading hides, which he sold to Leavenworth Prison for shoemaking by inmates. This success enabled him to construct a two-story brick building, which served as both their family home and a store. McMahon had two brothers, Jim and Chad, and the siblings completed their education through the tenth grade in Clyde.

McMahon attended Camden Point Christian College in Missouri, where she pursued music, art, and other subjects, completing her studies within two years. Upon her return home, she sought further education and enrolled in an expanded high school program established by Eugene "E.P." McMahon, who had recently become superintendent of schools in Clyde. After an initial conflict over educational credentials, McMahon completed her studies under E.P. McMahon, and they married in 1892.

== Career ==
Following their marriage, McMahon and E.P. McMahon relocated to Minneapolis, where their only child, Eugene Davis McMahon, was born on January 28, 1895. In Minneapolis, McMahon taught private piano lessons, eventually garnering significant recognition for her teaching, while her husband worked as the superintendent of schools. After a brief period in Minnesota, the McMahon family moved to Troy, Kansas, and later, in 1901, settled in Lawton, Oklahoma. In Lawton, E.P. McMahon established a law practice, and McMahon continued her piano teaching, actively participating in the cultural development of the city.

In 1940, after the death of her husband, McMahon and her son Eugene established the McMahon Foundation in his memory with an initial fund of US$50,000 (equivalent to $1,122,209 in 2024). Over time, McMahon and Eugene regularly added to the foundation's assets, allowing it to support a variety of causes and organizations in Lawton and Comanche County. Among its early recipients were City Mission, the Lawton fire department, which received funding for a resuscitator, and the Negro Mission. As the foundation's funds grew, it began providing scholarships for journalism students, supporting individuals in need, and assisting churches, schools, museums, and other public institutions.

Following her son's death in 1945, McMahon moved back to Lawton, where she constructed a building for the McMahon Foundation on the site of the family's original residence. Completed in 1948, the building not only housed the foundation's offices but also served as a cultural and community center for various local groups. It hosted meetings and small conferences for organizations such as the Woman's Forum, music clubs, and the Great Plains Writers, with a policy against political or controversial gatherings.

In 1953, McMahon played a pivotal role in developing the McMahon Auditorium in Lawton, which was dedicated the following year in honor of her family. Through the McMahon Foundation, she continued to support the arts and education, including a US$300,000 (equivalent to $3,358,649 in 2024) grant in 1957 for establishing the Museum of the Great Plains. This museum aimed to preserve and exhibit Oklahoma's cultural history, including musical history, family records, and the history of Lawton's social and cultural organizations.

== Personal life ==
McMahon was actively involved in her community and held strong ties with the Presbyterian Church. Her charitable efforts and contributions to society were widely recognized, and she was named Oklahoma's Mother of the Year in 1949. She was inducted in to the Oklahoma Hall of Fame in 1954 in the music category. In addition to her philanthropic work, McMahon was an author and painter, publishing her memoir, Reminiscences and Scrapbook, in 1957.

McMahon died on February 8, 1966. In tribute to her legacy, the McMahon Foundation funded the construction of a fine arts building at Cameron University. Over subsequent decades, the foundation continued its work, contributing over $75 million by the end of the 20th-century to educational, cultural, and social projects in the region.
