= Charles W. Van De Mark House =

Historic house in Kansas, United States

- U.S. National Register of Historic Places
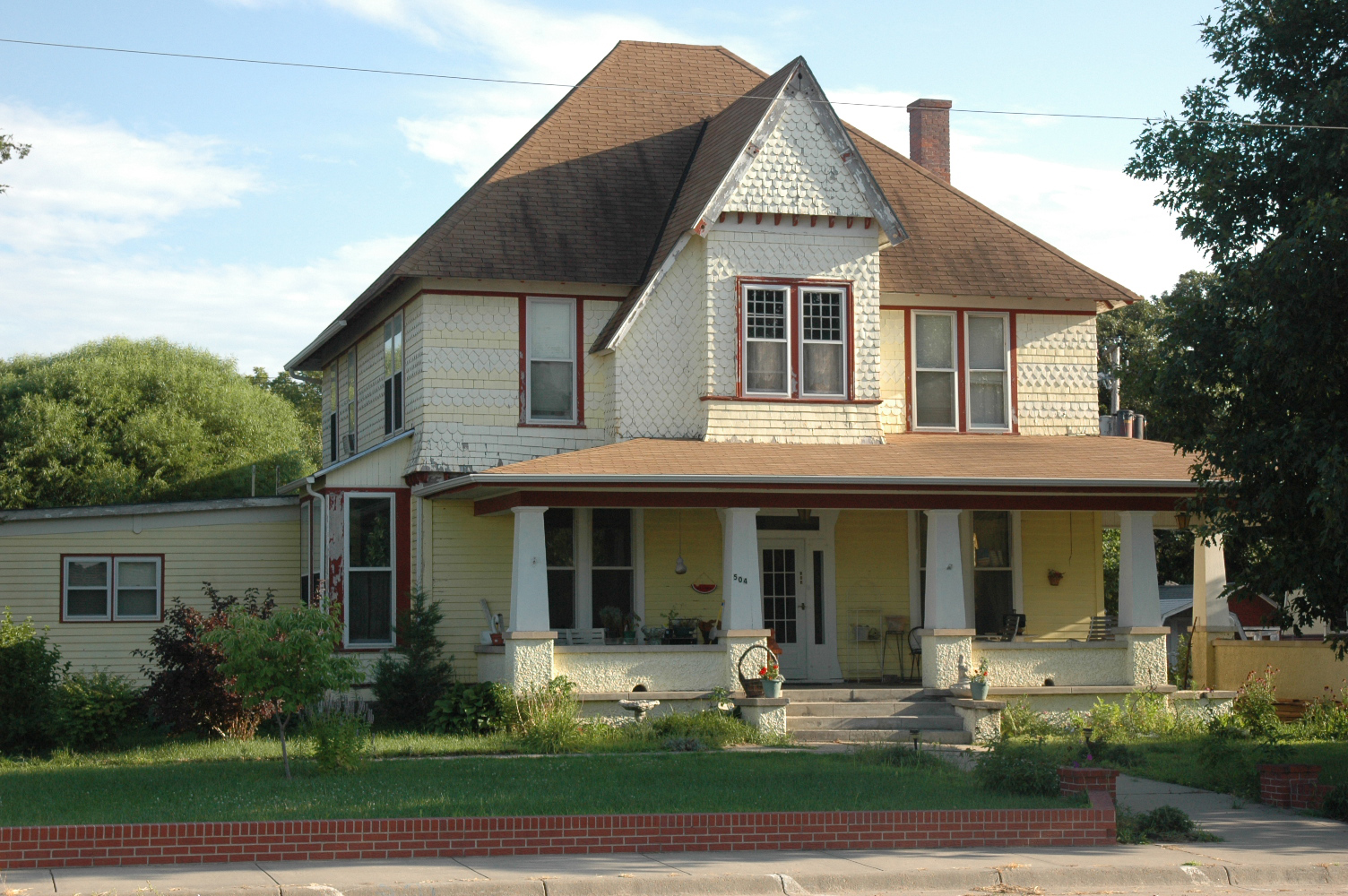

- Location within Kansas Location within the United States
- Location: 504 Washington; Clyde, Kansas
- Coordinates: 39°35′27.03″N 97°24′1.01″W
- Built: 1884
- Architectural style: Queen Anne style
- NRHP reference No.: 85001492
- Added to NRHP: July 5, 1985

Charles W. Van De Mark House is a Queen Anne style historic building located in Clyde, Kansas, which is listed on the National Register of Historic Places. It was listed in 1985. It was deemed notable " local architectural significance as one of the most elaborate and best preserved of the late nineteenth-century houses of Clyde."

It was converted to use as a restaurant in 1979, but is now a private home.

== Background ==
Charles W. Van De Mark was a prominent banker and attorney in Clyde, Kansas. He and his wife Elizabeth Stevens had three sons, Martin Van De Mark, Otis Van De Mark, and John V. Van De Mark. Martin was a very successful farmer in Kansas. Otis moved to Houston, Texas, where he had a successful business career. John V. Van De Mark went on to develop real estate in Houston with his uncle, Henry F. McGregor, as well as to serve as the Vice President of the Federal Land Bank in Houston.

== History ==
The two-story house was built for Van De Mark's family. The house was furnished with the finest mahogany paneling and millwork, which exist to this day.

== See also ==
- National Register of Historic Places listings in Cloud County, Kansas
