= Royals =

Royals may refer to:

== Entertainment ==
- The Royals (band), a Jamaican reggae vocal group
- The Royals, original name of The Midnighters
- "Royals" (Lorde song), 2013
- "Royals" (Paul Rey song), 2023
- The Royals (TV series), a 2015 E! network drama series
- The Royals, a 1997 book by Kitty Kelley about the British royal family
- Royals, a 2017 Marvel Comics series about the Inhumans
- Royals, a book series by Rachel Hawkins
  - Royals, the original publication title of Prince Charming, a 2018 novel in the series
- The Royals (2025 TV series), a 2025 Indian television series

== Sports teams ==
- Kansas City Royals, a Major League Baseball team
  - Burlington Royals, a minor league baseball farm team of the Kansas City Royals
  - Omaha Royals, former name of the Omaha Storm Chasers, a minor league baseball farm team of the Kansas City Royals
- Barbados Royals, a team in the Caribbean Premier League
- Barbados Royals (WCPL), a team in the Women's Caribbean Premier League
- Cincinnati Royals, a basketball team now known as the Sacramento Kings of the NBA
- Cornwall Royals, a defunct Canadian junior ice hockey team
- East Perth Football Club, an Australian rules football club nicknamed the Royals
- New Westminster Royals, the name of several hockey teams based in New Westminster, British Columbia
- Rajasthan Royals, an Indian Premier League cricket franchise
- Reading F.C., a football team in the Football League Championship
- Reading Royals, an ECHL ice hockey team based in Reading, Pennsylvania
- Royal AM F.C., a South African soccer team
- Royals Football Club, an Australian rules football club located in Albany, Western Australia
- Utah Royals, an American professional women’s soccer team
- Victoria Royals, a Western Hockey League team
- Busan Daewoo Royals, former name of South Korean football club Busan IPark
- A nickname for various sports teams from County Meath, Ireland

== Other uses ==
- Royal family, including a list of royal families
- Jalen Royals (born 2003), American football player

== See also ==
- Royal (disambiguation)
- Royale (disambiguation)
