= Glasco Downtown Historic District =

Historic district in Kansas, United States

- U.S. National Register of Historic Places
- U.S. Historic district
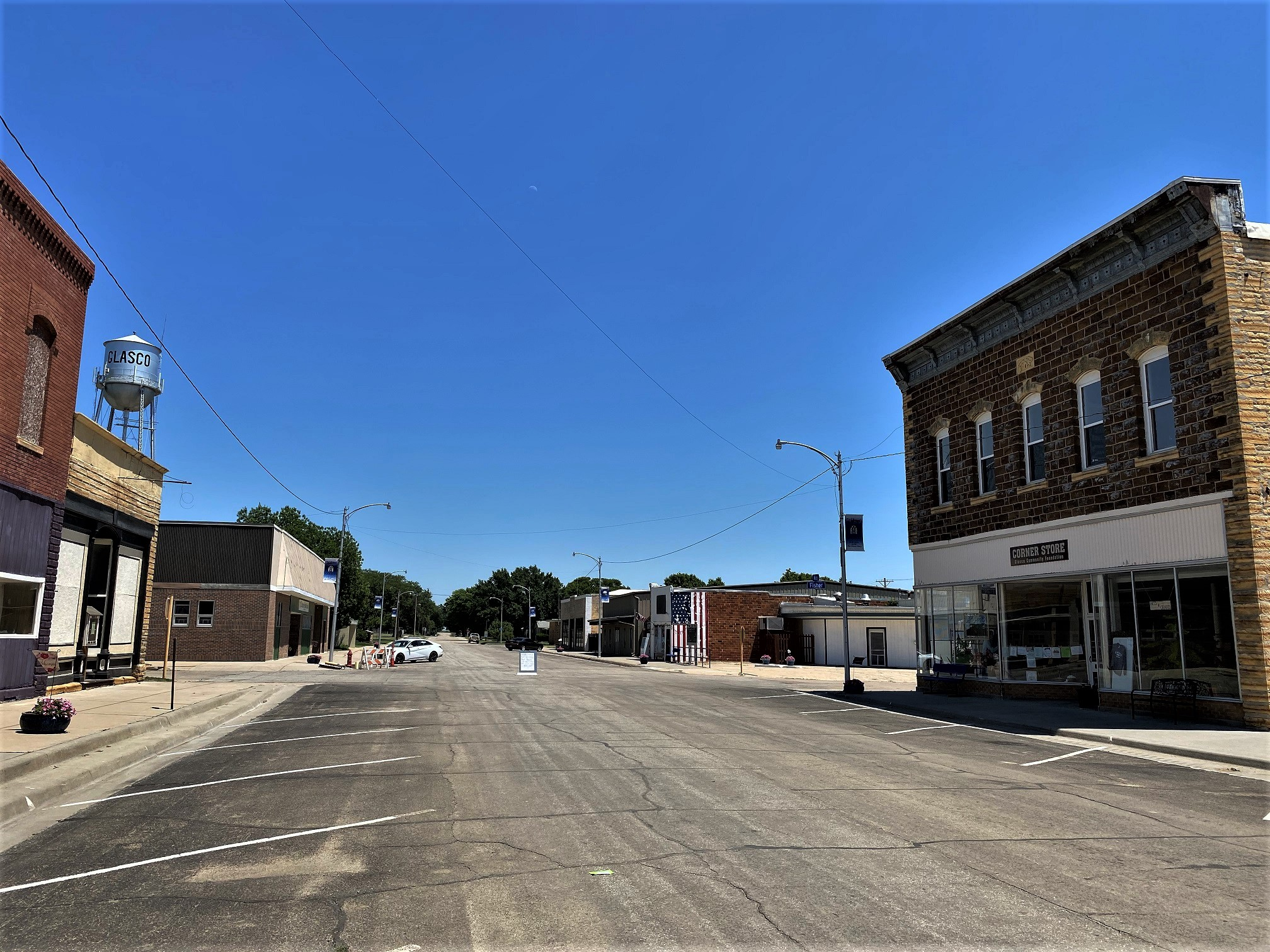

- Location within Kansas Location within the United States
- Location: Roughly along Main St. from Railroad Av. to Fisher St., and Along Railroad Ave and Fisher St. bet Main and Buffalo Sts., Glasco, Kansas
- Coordinates: 39°21′40″N 97°50′23″W
- Area: 3.9 acres (1.6 ha)
- Built: 1911
- Architect: Isaac Biggs, M.L. Hare
- Architectural style: Early Commercial, Italianate
- NRHP reference No.: 02001307
- Added to NRHP: November 17, 2002

Glasco Downtown Historic District is an early commercial, Italianate historic shopping area located in Glasco, Kansas that is listed on the National Register of Historic Places. The 3.9-acre (1.6 ha) historic district runs roughly along Main Street from Railroad Avenue to Fisher Street and continues along Railroad Avenue and Fisher Streets between Main and Buffalo Streets in Glasco. It includes 22 buildings deemed to contribute to the historic character of the area, one other contributing structure, and six non-contributing buildings.

It was listed on the National Register of Historic Places in 2002.

== See also ==
- National Register of Historic Places listings in Cloud County, Kansas
