= Konami Antiques MSX Collection =

- Cover art of Konami Antiques MSX Collection Ultra Pack.
- Developers: Konami Computer Entertainment Tokyo (PS); Konami Computer Entertainment Yokohama (Saturn)
- Publisher: Konami
- Platforms: PlayStation, Sega Saturn, PlayStation Network
- Release: 1997-1998: Vol. 1; JP: November 20, 1997 Vol. 2; JP: January 22, 1998 Vol. 3; JP: March 19, 1998 Ultra Pack; JP: July 23, 1998 PlayStation Network; JP: November 22, 2006
- Genre: Various

Konami Antiques MSX Collection is a series of compilations of MSX computer games released by Konami in Japan. The compilation was split between three volumes for the PlayStation between 1997 and 1998, each containing ten games. All thirty games were later compiled onto a single disc for the Konami Antiques MSX Collection Ultra Pack on the Sega Saturn in 1998.

== Games included ==
=== Vol. 1 ===
- Antarctic Adventure
- Gradius a.k.a. Nemesis
- Gofer no Yabō Episode II a.k.a. Nemesis 3
- Hyper Sports 2
- Konami's Boxing
- Konami's Ping Pong
- Mopi Ranger
- Road Fighter
- Sky Jaguar
- Yie Ar Kung-Fu

=== Vol. 2 ===
- Athletic Land
- Gradius 2 a.k.a. Nemesis 2
- Knightmare
- Konami's Golf
- Konami's Billiards
- Hyper Sports 3
- Magical Tree
- Super Cobra
- TwinBee
- Yie Ar Kung-Fu II

=== Vol. 3 ===
- Comic Bakery
- King's Valley
- Konami's Tennis
- Konami's Soccer
- Konami Rally
- Parodius
- Penguin Adventure
- Pippols
- Salamander
- Time Pilot

== See also ==
- List of Konami games
