= Frederick Vining =

English actor

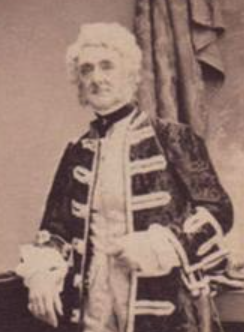
Frederick Vining as photographed by Camille Silvy in 1860

Frederick August Vining (4 November 1790 – 2 June 1871) was an English actor. His first appearance on the stage was at Gravesend, after which he worked at provincial theatres at Bath and Norwich. He went on to perform in London and was manager of the Theatre Royal, Haymarket. He enjoyed considerable repute in his heyday and was included in a collection of brief biographies of the principal actors and actresses of the British stage published in 1824 by Sherwood, Jones & Co.

== Family ==
He was the son of Charles Vining, a silversmith in Kirby Street, Hatton Garden, and was born in London in 1790. The actor George Vining was Frederick's nephew. They were part of an extensive family of actors.

== Career ==
His first appearance was at the age of sixteen. He played Young Norval in the play Douglas at the Theatre Royal, Gravesend. He remained on the Gravesend, Worthing, Hythe, and Brighton circuit for four years.

He appeared at Covent Garden in London in 1813: roles included Frederick in The Poor Gentleman, Harry Dornton in The Road to Ruin, Count Frederick Friberg in The Miller and his Men by Isaac Pocock, as one of the original cast, and Frederick in The Jew.

At Bath he appeared in 1821 as Benedick in Much Ado About Nothing, and played during the 1821/22 season, among other roles, one or two original parts, including Tressilian in Kenilworth.

From 1823 he appeared at the Haymarket in London: roles included Young Rapid in A Cure for the Heart Ache, Dick Dowlas in The Heir at Law, Almaviva in The Marriage of Figaro, Charles Franklin—an original part—in Sweethearts and Wives by James Kenney, and Flexible in Kenney's Love, Law, and Physic. He later acted as stage manager at the Haymarket for a short period.

He died in Camberwell. In an obituary published in the Birmingham Daily Gazette he was described as having the skill and gallant bearing which "gave evidence of the good training which characterised the comedian of the old school" which he exhibited up to his last engagement at the Olympic Theatre at the beginning of the 1860s, after which he suffered from reduced mental capacity, being cared for in a private asylum for the last years of his life.

== Garotte attack ==
In June 1867 he was the victim, with others, of what was termed 'a garotte attack', from which he recovered. The circumstances were not reported by the press, and are unknown; however, robbery by clutching of the throat was then a widely-feared risk in London.
