= Magical Tree =

1984 video game

- Developer: Konami
- Publisher: Konami
- Platforms: MSX, Windows
- Release: JP: 1984; Windows: JP: January 27, 2015
- Genre: Platform
- Modes: Single-player, multiplayer

Magical Tree (マジカル ツリー, Majikaru tsurī) is a vertically scrolling platform game developed by Konami for the MSX home computer, and published in 1984.

Konami included Magical Tree in the 1998 anthology Konami Antiques MSX Collection, Vol. 2 for PlayStation.

== Gameplay ==
The player character is an "Indian brave" stereotype who wears a tanned vest and trousers, and a headband with a feather. The player ascends a magical tree by hopping from branch to branch and climbing vines and ladders—while also dodging larvae, owls, and lightning bolts. The player can jump and dangle from branches. He earns points by gathering apples, arrows, daggers, and coronets.

The tree is 2,004 meters (6,575 ft) tall. A gauge tracks the player's altitude, and at the conclusion of each level the game informs the player how much further to climb to reach the goal: a castle on the treetop. The ascent is divided into nine game levels; the player character dances at the conclusion of each level.

When the player clears the ninth level, a curtain opens to reveal the castle at the top of the tree. Smiling from the crenels of the castle's parapet are a young woman in a purple frock, and a man wearing a war bonnet. After the end sequence, the game then continues at the base of the tree.

== See also ==
- Spider-Man (1982)
- Ice Climber (1985)
