= George Dockins =

American baseball player (1917–1997)

- Pitcher
- Born: May 5, 1917; Clyde, Kansas, U.S.
- Died: January 22, 1997 (aged 79); Clyde, Kansas, U.S.
- Batted: Left Threw: Left

MLB debut
- May 5, 1945, for the St. Louis Cardinals

Last MLB appearance
- August 19, 1947, for the Brooklyn Dodgers

MLB statistics
- Win–loss record: 8–6
- Earned run average: 3.55
- Strikeouts: 34
- Stats at Baseball Reference

Teams
- St. Louis Cardinals (1945); Brooklyn Dodgers (1947)

George Woodrow Dockins (May 5, 1917 – January 22, 1997) was an American professional baseball pitcher who played for the St. Louis Cardinals (1945) and Brooklyn Dodgers (1947). The left-hander stood 6 ft 0 in (1.83 m) and weighed 175 lb (79 kg). Dockins is the only Major League Baseball player from Clyde, Kansas.

Dockins had a rookie season of 8–6 with a 3.21 ERA. He made his major league debut for the Cardinals in relief on May 5, 1945, against the Chicago Cubs at Sportsman's Park. His first big-league win came twenty-five days later, also in relief, in a 12-inning, 4–2 victory over the Boston Braves in the first game of a home doubleheader. He threw his first MLB shutout on August 8, 1945, against the New York Giants at the Polo Grounds.

After the manpower shortage caused by World War II was over, Dockins got into four more big league games. Pitching in relief for Brooklyn in 1947, he gave up seven earned runs in 51/3 innings. From 1946 to 1949, he spent most of his professional career with the Fort Worth Cats, the Dodgers' Double-A affiliate. With them, he had a 12–6 record and a 2.16 ERA in 20 games in 1946. He briefly served as the Cats' manager in 1948 on an interim basis. He compiled a stellar 105–54 record over 237 minor-league games pitched over nine seasons, missing the entire 1944 campaign with an injured shoulder.

Dockins' career totals for 35 games pitched include an 8–6 record, five complete games, and two shutouts. He allowed 52 earned runs in 1312/3 innings pitched for an ERA of 3.55. He handled 31 out of 32 chances successfully for a fielding percentage of .969.

Dockins died in his hometown at age 79 in 1997.
