= Teatro Regio =

Teatro Regio (Italian for 'Royal Theatre') may refer to several opera houses in Italy:

- Teatro Regio (Parma)
- Teatro Regio (Turin)
- Teatro Regio Ducale, Milan, a predecessor of La Scala

== See also ==
- Theatre Royal (disambiguation)
- Royal Theatre (disambiguation)
