= Clifton–Clyde USD 224 =

Public school district in Clyde, Kansas

Address
- 616 N. High St. Clyde, Kansas, 66938; United States
- Coordinates: 39°35′47″N 97°24′26″W

District information
- Type: Public
- Grades: K to 12
- Schools: 3

Other information
- Website: usd224.com

Clifton–Clyde USD 224 is a public unified school district headquartered in Clyde, Kansas, United States. The district includes the communities of Clifton, Clyde, Vining, Ames, St. Joseph, and nearby rural areas.

== Schools ==
The school district operates the following schools:

- Clifton Clyde High School, located in Clyde
- Clifton Clyde Middle School, located in Clifton
- Clifton Clyde Grade School, located in Clifton

== See also ==
- Kansas State Department of Education
- Kansas State High School Activities Association
- List of high schools in Kansas
- List of unified school districts in Kansas
