= Republican River Pegram Truss =

Historic bridge in Kansas, U.S.

- U.S. National Register of Historic Places
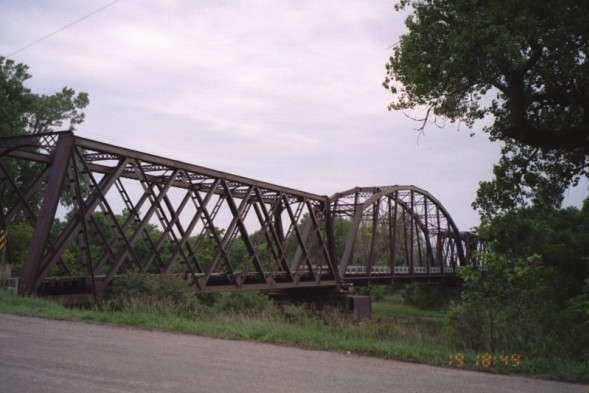
- View of the bridge from the northeast, evening of August 19, 2006.

- Location within Kansas Location within the United States
- Location: Cloud County, Kansas
- Nearest city: Concordia, Kansas
- Coordinates: 39.59611°N 97.57117°W
- Area: less than one acre
- Built: 1893
- MPS: Metal Truss Bridges in Kansas 1861--1939 MPS
- NRHP reference No.: 89002190
- Added to NRHP: January 4, 1990

The Republican River Pegram Truss is a bridge located near Concordia, Kansas that is listed on the National Register of Historic Places. It is a three-span through truss bridge over the Republican River on route 795, northeast of Concordia. The bridge was built in 1893 by the Edge Moor Bridge Works of Wilmington, Delaware.

This bridge, originally erected as a railroad bridge, consists of a Pegram truss span between two triple-intersection Warren (lattice) truss spans. It is the only Pegram truss bridge used to carry automobile traffic in Kansas.

== See also ==
- National Register of Historic Places listings in Cloud County, Kansas
