= Pott's Ford Bridge =

Bridge in Kansas, U.S.

- U.S. National Register of Historic Places
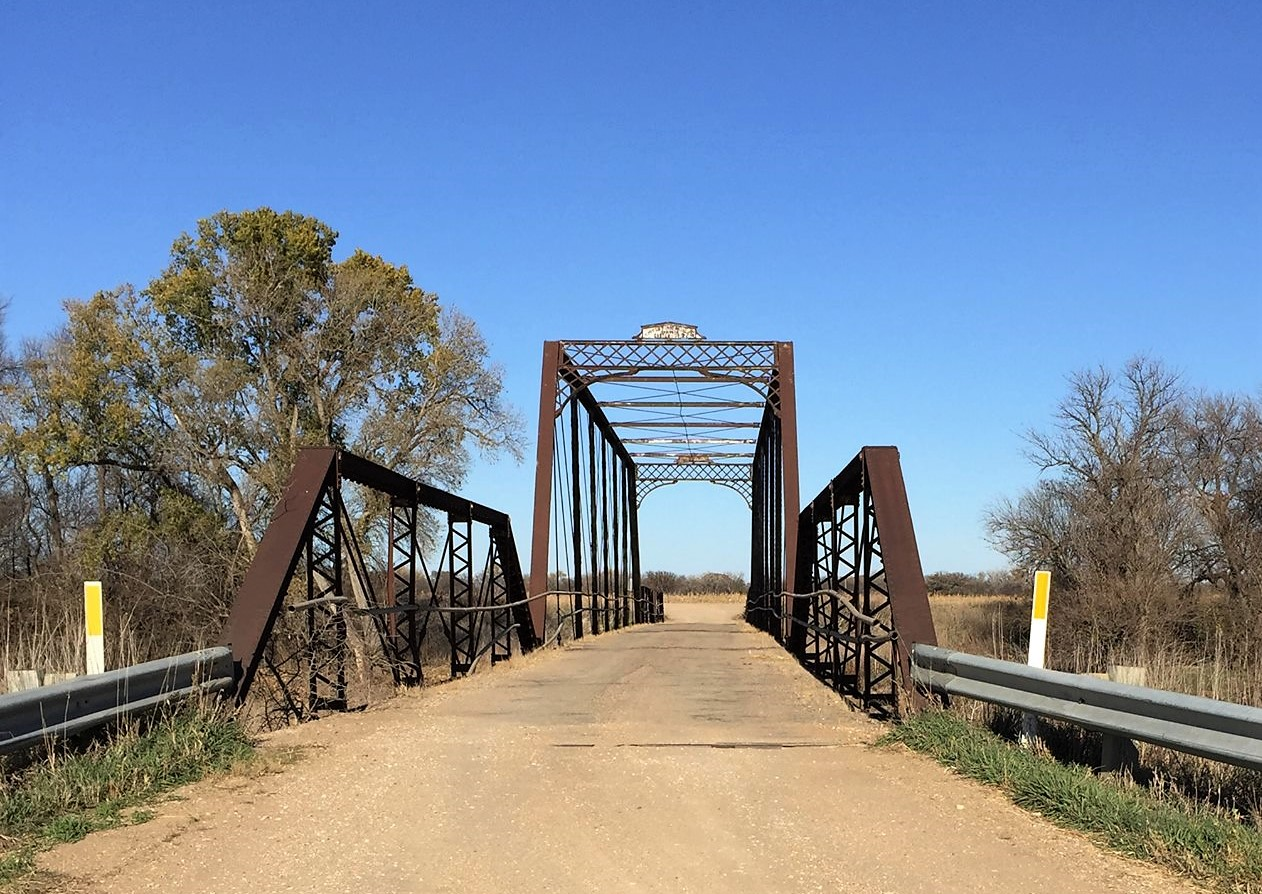

- Location within Kansas
- Location: 1 mile west and 1 mile north of the intersection of F.A.S 135 and 1043 on unmarked countv road, in or near Glasco, Kansas
- Coordinates: 39°21′0.8″N 97°51′14.69″W
- Built: 1884
- Architect: Wrought Iron Bridge Company
- MPS: Metal Truss Bridges in Kansas 1861-1939 MPS
- NRHP reference No.: 89002173
- Added to NRHP: January 4, 1990

Pott's Ford Bridge is a bridge 1/2 mile south of Glasco, Kansas, USA that spans the Solomon River in Cloud County, Kansas. It has a wooden deck with three bowstring pony trusses and one Pratt pony truss. The lengths of the trusses are 48 feet (15 m), 46 feet (14 m), and 149 feet (45 m) for the bowstring trusses, and 72 feet (22 m) for the Pratt truss. It was built in 1884 by the Wrought Iron Bridge Company of Canton, Ohio.

The bridge is listed on the National Register of Historic Places.

== See also ==
- National Register of Historic Places listings in Cloud County, Kansas
