= King's Valley =

1985 video game

- Developer: Konami
- Publisher: Konami
- Platform: MSX
- Release: 1985
- Genre: Platform
- Mode: Single-player

King's Valley is a platform game released by Konami for the MSX in 1985. The game is considered a spiritual successor to Konami's arcade maze shooter Tutankham (1982), with the same theme of treasure hunting in Egyptian tombs and having an identical end-level music tune. It also has similarities to Lode Runner (1983).

The game was initially released on ROM cartridge with 15 levels. A floppy disk version with 60 levels was planned, but shelved. It was included in the 1988 Konami Game Collection Vol. 1 for MSX.

== Gameplay ==
King's Valley is a platform game with puzzle elements, in which the player controls an archaeologist exploring a tomb in search of jewels. On his way, the hero encounters an army of multi-colored mummies chasing him and uses throwing knives for protection. To reach the hidden gems, the archaeologist must use special tools, such as pickaxes, which allow him to dig through brick walls. There are a total of 15 rooms in the game, some of which occupy two screens, and only after collecting all the jewels on the level, the door to the next stage opens.

== Reviews ==
Reception

Review scores
Publication	Score
MSX User	8/10 (MSX)
MSX Magazine	4/5 (MSX)
What MSX?	8/10 (MSX)
MSX Extra	7/10 (MSX)

The MSX User magazine considered King's Valley one of the best platformer games available for MSX, as in their view, careful planning and quick thinking are necessary to achieve success. The critic from the Japanese magazine MSX Magazine also found the game well-balanced in difficulty and engaging due to the need to carefully plan one's actions. What MSX? also praised the graphics and sound effects, noting that they "utilise MSX's capabilities brilliantly". MSX Extra reviewer complained that in some moments, the main character lacks speed of movement, especially when pursued by fast blue mummies, which greatly complicate the gameplay.

== Legacy ==
In 1998, King's Valley was included in the Konami Antiques MSX Collection Vol. 3 compilation for the PlayStation, and later in the Ultra Pack for the Saturn. In 2002, a mobile version of the game was released. Despite the original MSX version being published in Europe, none of the re-releases were published outside of Japan. There is also a version for the MSX on floppy disks, containing 60 levels instead of 15 and a level editor; it is included in the Konami Game Collection Vol. 1 compilation.

There is an unofficial version for the ZX Spectrum, created in 2009 by Retro Works.

A sequel, King's Valley II, was released with separate MSX and MSX2 versions.

== See also ==
- Pharaoh's Revenge (1988)
