= Royal Theatre =

Royal Theatre or Royal Theater may refer to:

== Venues ==
=== Australia ===
- Royal Theatre, Canberra

=== Belgium ===
- Royal Theatre of La Monnaie, Brussels
- Royal Park Theatre, Brussels
- Royal Flemish Theatre, Brussels

=== Canada ===
- Royal Theatre, Victoria, British Columbia
- Royal Alexandra Theatre, Toronto

=== Denmark ===
- Royal Danish Theatre, Copenhagen

=== Morocco ===
- Royal Theatre of Rabat

=== France ===
- Théâtre Royal de Bourbon, Paris, destroyed in 1660 ("Royal Theater of Bourbon" in English)

=== Italy ===
- Teatro Regio, Parma ("Royal Theater" in English)
- Teatro Regio, Turin
- Teatro Regio Ducale, Milan, a predecessor of La Scala ("Royal Ducal Theater" in English)

=== The Netherlands ===
- Koninklijke Schouwburg, The Hague ("Royal Theater" in English)

=== Spain ===
- Teatro Real, Madrid ("Royal Theater" in English)

=== Sweden ===
- Royal Dramatic Theatre, Stockholm

=== United Kingdom ===
- Royal Theatre, Northampton, England
- Royal National Theatre, London, England
- Royal Shakespeare Theatre, Stratford-upon-Avon, England

=== United States ===
- Royal Theatre, Benton, Arkansas; listed on the NRHP
- Royal Theatre, San Francisco, California; active from 1913 until 2003, and now demolished
- Royal Theater, St. Petersburg, Florida
- Royal Theater, Hogansville, Georgia; listed on the NRHP
- Royal Theater, Danville, Indiana
- Royal Theatre, Baltimore, Maryland; now demolished
- Royal Theater, New York City; Yiddish theater built c. 1913–1914, also known as "Malvina Lobel's Royal Theater"
- Bernard B. Jacobs Theatre, New York City, formerly known as the "Royale Theatre" from 1927 to 1932, and from 1940 to 2005
- Royal Theater, Philadelphia, Pennsylvania; listed on the NRHP
- Scotland Royal Theater, Scotland, South Dakota; listed on the NRHP
- Royal Theatre, Ashland, Wisconsin

== Other uses ==
- The Royal Theatre, a 2004 album by the Scottish group Ballboy

== See also ==
- Theatre Royal (disambiguation)
- Teatro Regio (disambiguation)
- Royal Opera (disambiguation)
