= Theatre Royal, Hyde =

Edwardian theatre in Hyde, England

- Royal Cinema (later years)
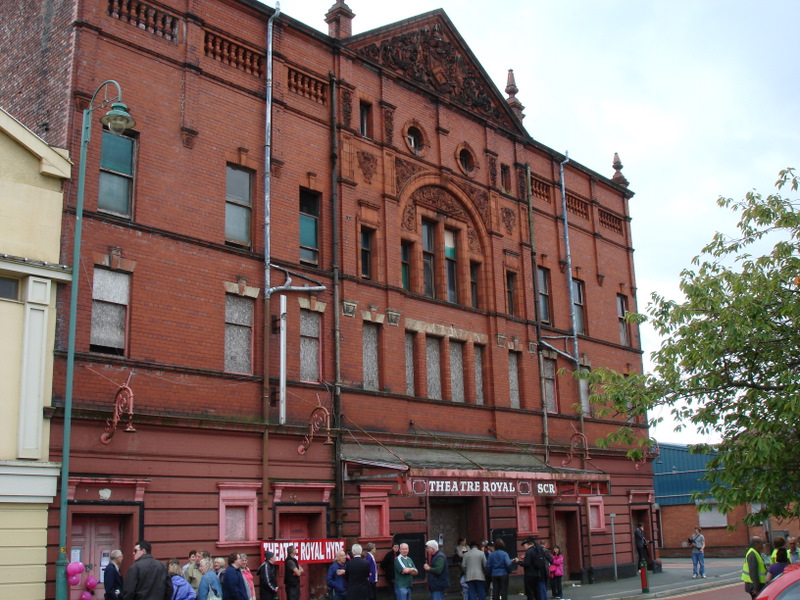
- Theatre Royal on Heritage Open Day 2011
- Interactive map of Theatre Royal, Hyde
- Address: Corporation Street, Hyde, Greater Manchester, England
- Coordinates: 53.450094°N 2.080552°W
- Owner: Aurora Hyde Limited (developer)
- Capacity: c.1,400
- Type: Theatre and Cinema
- Designation: Grade II listed

Construction
- Opened: 1902
- Closed: August 1993
- Years active: 90 years
- Architects: Campbell and Horsley of Manchester

Website
- hydetheatreroyal.co.uk

The Theatre Royal is a Grade II listed Edwardian theatre situated on Corporation Street, Hyde, Greater Manchester, England.

== History ==
Planning permission was granted by the local council to build a licensed theatre to replace the Theatre Royal of nearby Frank Street in 1901. The theatre was designed by Campbell and Horsley of Manchester and built by S. Robinson and Sons of Hyde. The completed theatre opened on 3 November 1902 with a Victorian French melodrama, Little Jim, with Shakespeare and other classic plays to follow. In 1914 a movable screen was added onto the stage to enable the theatre to operate as a part-time cinema.

In the early 1970s, the popularity of live performances were on the decline and the decision was made to stop them altogether at the theatre. The main auditorium become a full-time cinema and a second cinema opened in 1972 taking up the majority of the original stage area. The last live performance held was a production of Annie Get Your Gun.

In later years, the main auditorium was referred to as 'Royal 1' and the second cinema was referred to as 'Royal 2'. The theatre was also referred to as the 'Royal Cinema' although the 'Theatre Royal' signs remained on the building .

In the early 1990s, the London-based owners discovered problems with fraud at the theatre and decided to close it down in August 1993 as they considered it a liability. The theatre was full for the last few days of business, with people still offering support to Hyde's last local cinema. The final film to be shown was Walt Disney's classic, The Jungle Book.

== The theatre ==
The main auditorium could seat up to 1400 people, it consisted of pit stalls with 300 seats, dress and rear circles with another 300 seats, then a gallery and amphi with 800 seats. The theatre also offered one of the largest stages in the area with a fly gallery offering fast scenery changes.

== Famous faces ==
During its peak, the Theatre Royal offered performances by many famous acts of the day including Laurel and Hardy, Enrico Caruso, Billy Connolly and Frank Randle. Julie Andrews also made an early appearance at the theatre along with her mother and stepfather.

== Theatre Royal Onward ==
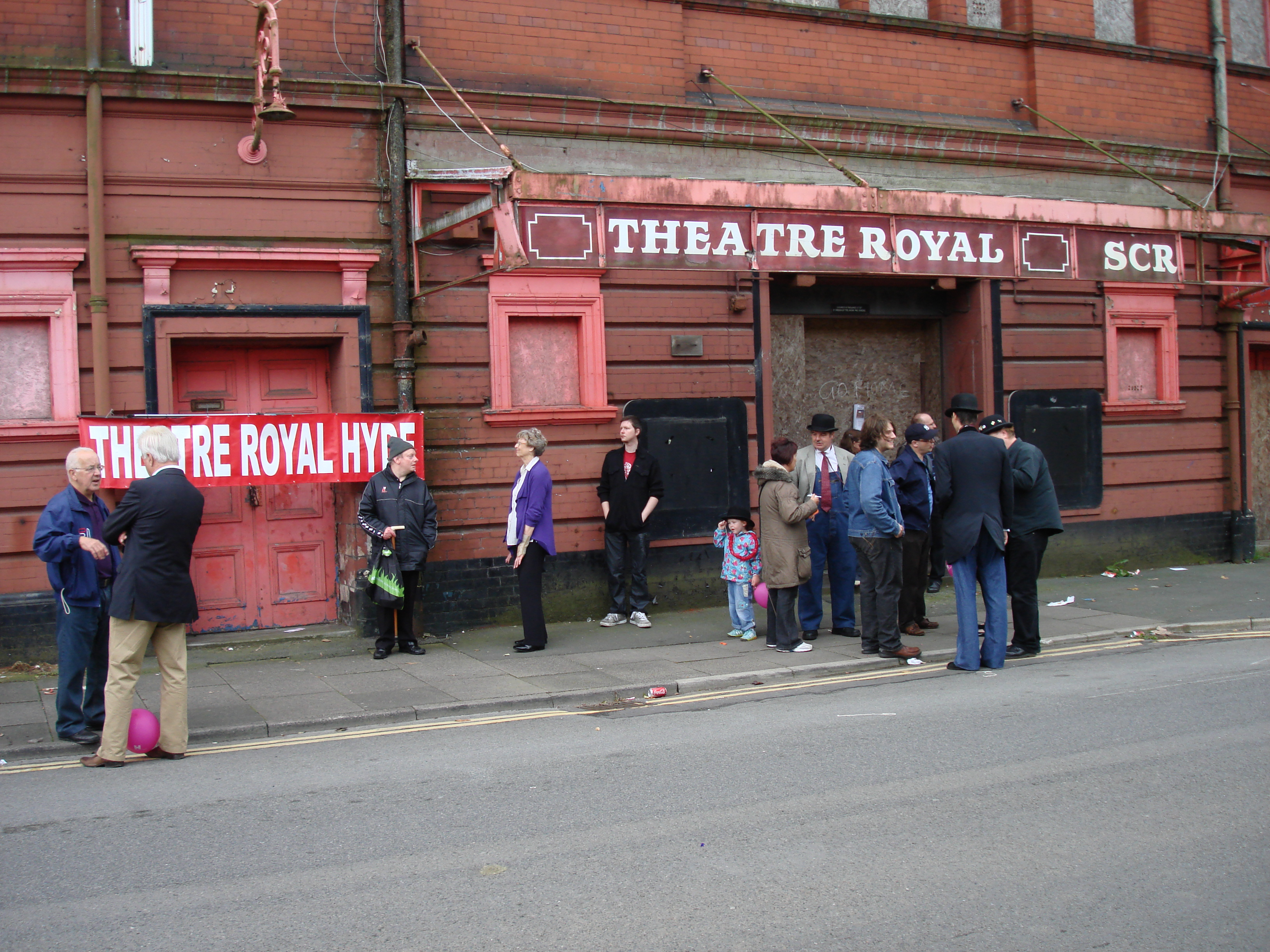
Supporters of The Theatre Royal, September 2011

In 1999, planning permission was in the process of being granted to demolish the theatre to make way for a housing development. However, a group of volunteers joined together to save the Theatre Royal, named Theatre Royal Onward, and campaigned for it to be granted Grade II listed building status, which it received on 13 April 2000. The theatre was put up for auction in 2005 however the society lost the bid to buy the theatre and it was sold to a local property developer, Aurora Hyde Limited. However the fight to return the theatre to its former glory continues, much like the campaign to save another local theatre, Stockport Plaza which was successful.

The theatre has been open to the public on Heritage Open Days, however in 2011 this was not possible due to building work being carried out within the theatre itself by the present owners. The society instead organised a classic 1960s cinema queue to congregate outside in support of the theatre restoration. The campaign was very popular with many local residents joining and a local radio station arriving to interview people of their memories.
