= Royal institute =

Royal Institute or Royal Institution may refer to:

== In the UK ==
- Royal Institute of British Architects
- Royal Institute of Chemistry
- Royal Institute of Navigation, UK professional organisation
- Royal Institute of Oil Painters
- Royal Institute of Painters in Water Colours
- Royal Institute of Philosophy
- Royal Institution of Great Britain
- Royal Institution for the Encouragement of the Fine Arts, now the Royal Scottish Academy
- Royal Institution of Chartered Surveyors
- Royal Archaeological Institute
- Royal Anthropological Institute of Great Britain and Ireland
- Royal Belfast Academical Institution
- Royal Black Institution
- Royal National Institute of Blind People
- Royal National Institute for Deaf People
- Royal National Lifeboat Institution
- Royal Town Planning Institute
- Royal United Services Institute
- Liverpool Royal Institution
- Chatham House (Royal Institute of International Affairs)

== In Australia ==
- Royal Institute for Deaf and Blind Children, Sydney, Australia
- Royal Australian Chemical Institute
- Royal Australian Institute of Architects
- Royal Australian Institute of Architects Gold Medal

== In other countries ==
- Royal Institute of Technology, Stockholm, Sweden
- Royal Institute of Thailand
- Royal Institute of the Amazigh Culture, Rabat, Morocco
- Royal Institute of the Architects of Ireland
- Royal Architectural Institute of Canada
- Royal Belgian Institute of Natural Sciences
- Royal Canadian Institute
- Grand Ducal Institute, Luxembourg
- Royal New Zealand Institute of Horticulture
- KNMI (institute) (Royal Dutch Meteorological Institute)
- Royal Cork Institution, Ireland
