= King's Valley II =

1988 video game

- Developer: Konami
- Publisher: Konami
- Composers: Kazuhiko Uehara; Masahiro Ikariko; Kinuyo Yamashita; Motoaki Furukawa; Michiru Yamane
- Series: King's Valley
- Platform: MSX
- Release: 1988
- Genres: Platform, puzzle
- Mode: Single-player

King's Valley II: The Seal of El Giza is a game for the MSX and MSX2 computers by Konami in 1988. It is a sequel to King's Valley from 1985.

The MSX2 version was only released in Japan. It has minor changes: the music was remixed and some of the items and backgrounds recolored. A rare "contest" version was also only available in Japan. The contest was about making levels with the games' built-in level editor, held by four Japanese MSX magazines, two of them are MSX.FAN and Beep. The winners of this contest received a gold cartridge with the twenty custom stages on it. Custom levels can be saved to either a disk or tape, and the levels are interchangeable between both the MSX1 and MSX2 versions.

== Plot ==
The game is set into the far future, when inter-planetary archaeologist Vick XIII makes a shocking discovery: The pyramids on Earth are malfunctioning devices of alien origin, with enough energy to destroy Earth. It is up to Vick to switch off the core functions of El Giza.

== Gameplay ==
The game consists of six pyramids each with its own wall engravings and color pattern; every pyramid contains 10 levels. The idea of the game is to collect crystals called soul stones in each level by solving the different puzzles and evading or killing the enemies using the many tools and weapons available to unlock the exit door that will take the players to the next level.

== Legacy ==
The Konami game Castlevania: Portrait of Ruin for the Nintendo DS reuses the stage music "In Search of the Secret Spell" and "Sandfall" for the Egyptian area of the game.

Castlevania: Harmony of Despair uses a remix of the Stage Clear theme as the Stage Clear theme for Chapter 7: Beauty, Desire, Situation Dire (not found on the OST).
