= Vale Royal (disambiguation) =

Vale Royal or variation, may refer to:

- Vale Royal, Cheshire, England, UK; a former local government borough
- Vale Royal (Jamaica), official residence of the Prime Minister of Jamaica
- Vale Royal Abbey, Whitegate, Cheshire, England, UK; a former abbey and later mansion
  - Abbot of Vale Royal
- Vale Royal Company, ironmongery founded by the Vale Royal Abbey
- Vale Royal Methodist Church, Royal Tunbridge Wells, Kent, England
- Warrington and Vale Royal College, Warrington, Cheshire, England, UK; a vocational college

== See also ==
- Royal Vale School, a French-immersion English-language school in Montreal, Quebec, Canada
- Royal Vale Elementary School (1951–1980), former occupant of the Royal West Academy building in Montreal, Quebec, Canada
- Royal (disambiguation)
- Royal Gorge (disambiguation)
- Royal Valley (disambiguation)
- Vale (disambiguation)
