= Palladium (Stockholm) =

Cinema in Stockholm, Sweden

Coordinates: 59°19′N 18°4′E

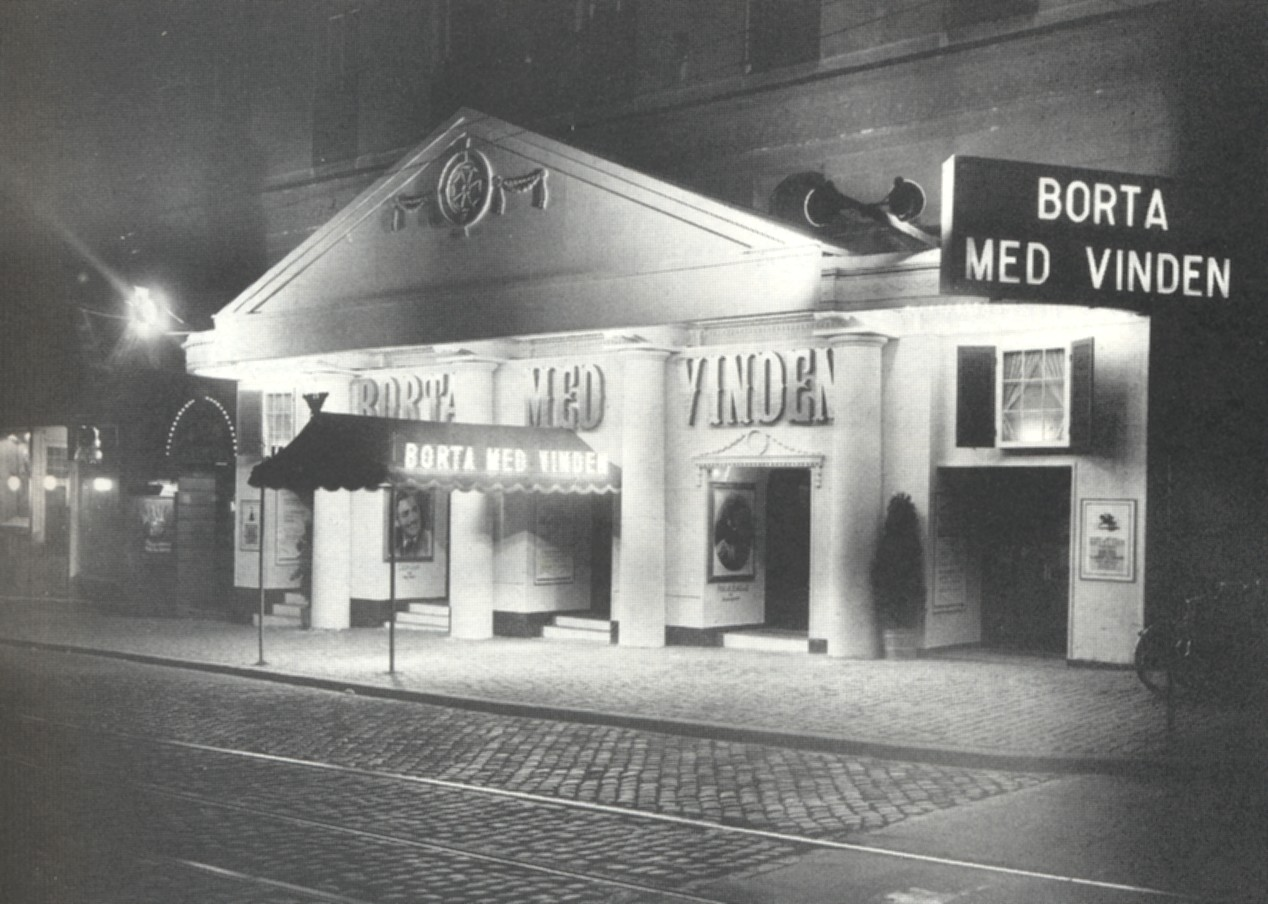
A view of the entrance to the cinema in 1941.

The Palladium was a cinema in the Swedish capital Stockholm that operated between 1918 and 1987. It was the largest cinema in Sweden when it opened with more than 1,200 seats. A number of premieres of Svensk Filmindustri releases took place there as well as foreign imports. The site is now the Casino Cosmopol.

== Bibliography ==
- Mette Hjort & Ursula Lindqvist. A Companion to Nordic Cinema. John Wiley & Sons, 2016.
