= Aznom Palladium =

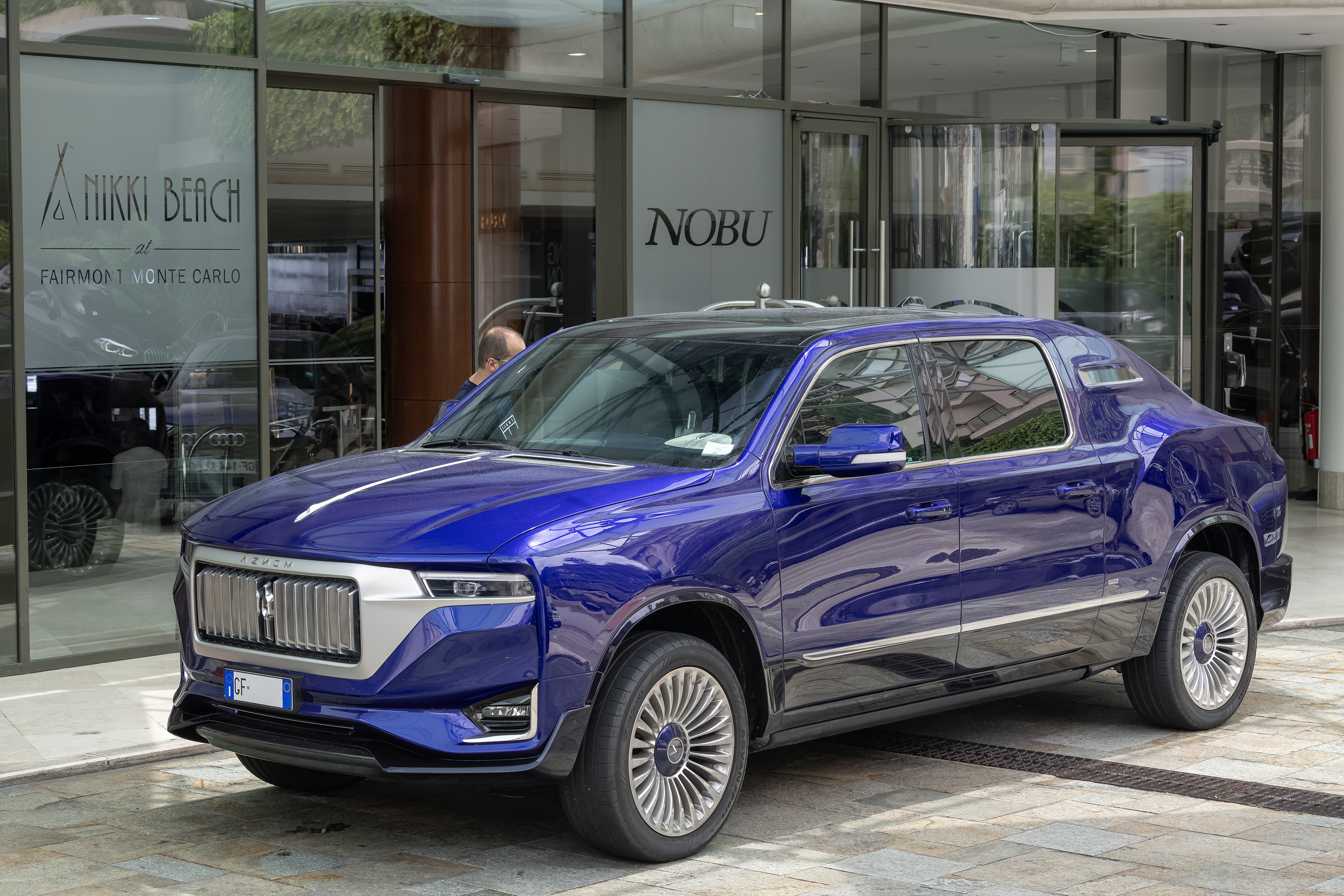

Overview
- Manufacturer: Aznom Automotive
- Production: 2020-present (10 units planned)
- Assembly: Italy: Camal S.R.L, Torino
- Designer: Marcello Meregalli

Body and chassis
- Class: Full-size luxury car
- Body style: 5-door limousine
- Layout: Front-engine, all-wheel-drive Front-engine, rear-wheel-drive
- Related: Ram Pickup (fifth generation)

Powertrain
- Engine: 5.7 L Hemi V8 biturbo
- Transmission: 8-speed automatic transmission

Dimensions
- Wheelbase: 3,670 mm (144.5 in)
- Length: 5,960 mm (234.6 in)
- Width: 2,085 mm (82.1 in)
- Height: 1,971 mm (77.6 in)
- Curb weight: 2,650 kg (5,840 lb)

Chronology
- Predecessor: Aznom Atulux

The Aznom Palladium is a full-size luxury vehicle, based on the Ram 1500 pickup truck, under the Italian luxury brand Aznom since 2020.

== Overview ==
The Palladium was unveiled in 2020. Designed by Marcello Meregalli, the Palladium was planned to be the successor of the Ram-based sedan, the ‘Aznom Atulux’. It is 5,960 millimeters long, making it a full-size SUV/limousine/sedan. Due to the amount of time each Aznom Palladium takes to build (eight months), Marcello Meregalli said there will only be 10 units planned, with the first sale being a UAE businessman.

== Design ==
The Palladium is a full-size ultra luxury crossover/sedan, or can be classified as a ‘hyper’ limousine. It has Ram-like headlights, with near-connecting clear taillights. It is one of the largest luxury SUVs/sedans to ever be built. It blends elements of the Bentley Flying Spur, the Rolls-Royce Phantom, and the Lamborghini Urus in its design.
