= Mentzelia densa =

Conservation status
- Imperiled (NatureServe)

Scientific classification
- Kingdom: Plantae
- Clade: Tracheophytes
- Clade: Angiosperms
- Clade: Eudicots
- Clade: Asterids
- Order: Cornales
- Family: Loasaceae
- Genus: Mentzelia
- Species: M. densa

Binomial name
- Mentzelia densa Greene

Synonyms
- List: Hesperaster densus; Mentzelia multiflora var. densa; Mentzelia pumila var. densa; Nuttallia densa; Touterea densa

Plant species in the stickleaf family

Mentzelia densa is a species of flowering plant in the Loasaceae known by the common names Royal Gorge blazingstar and Royal Gorge stickleaf. It is endemic to Colorado in the United States, where it occurs in the Arkansas River Valley in Fremont and Chaffee Counties.

This plant is a biennial herb or perennial subshrub generally growing no more than 30 centimeters tall. Its hairy white stems curve upward, forming a ball shape. It can form tumbleweeds. The narrow leaves are hairy. The flowers have pointed bright yellow petals and are about 2 centimeters wide. They open in the afternoon. The toothed fruit is up to 2 centimeters long by 1 centimeter wide. The fruit can cling to animals' fur.

This plant grows in pinyon-juniper woodland and open shrubland. It may be a dominant plant at disturbed sites, such as washes. The soil is rocky, gravelly, or sandy. Associated plants include Pinus edulis, Juniperus monosperma, Juniperus scopulorum, Symphoricarpos oreophilus, Cercocarpus montanus, Artemisia tridentata, Eriogonum jamesii, Oryzopsis hymenoides, Oryzopsis micrantha, Mentzelia multiflora var. leucopetala, Bouteloua gracilis, Rhus trilobata, Heterotheca villosa, Cylindropuntia imbricata, and Opuntia phaeacantha.

There are about 15 occurrences of this plant, but some have not been seen recently. The plant is threatened by recreational activities in the Arkansas River Valley.
