= George Vining =

English actor and theatre manager

George James Vining (c. 1824 – 17 December 1875) was an English actor and theatre manager, appearing in London theatres. For several years he was manager of the Princess's Theatre.

== Family background ==
George Vining was a member of a family of actors and actresses. His grandparents and their common ancestors were Charles Vining, a silversmith in Kirby Street, Hatton Garden, and his wife Mary. They had eight children, and all became connected with the theatre.

James Vining (1795–1870), George's father, was first seen in London at Covent Garden Theatre in 1828, as Tybalt in Romeo and Juliet. He was with Madame Vestris at the Olympic Theatre in 1831. One of his later parts was Doctor Manette in Tom Taylor's adaptation of A Tale of Two Cities in 1860, and his last appearance was at the Lyceum in that year. John Joseph Knight wrote that "he was seen to most advantage in lovers and fops".

James's brothers William (1783–1861) and Frederick (1790–1871) were also actors. William's wife Mary Gossop Vining (1795/6–1868) was an actress, known particularly in the roles of Helen Macgregor in Rob Roy and Meg Merrilies in Guy Mannering.

== Life ==
George Vining was educated at St Peter's Grammar School, Eaton Square, London, and subsequently in France. After serving as clerk in a bank six years, towards the end of which he played with an histrionic club at St James's Theatre, he first appeared professionally in December 1845 in Newmarket, as Hamlet. In Jersey he met William Macready, in whose company his father had been, and accepted an engagement to play with him in Bath and Bristol. He then joined Mary Warner at the Marylebone Theatre, making there, in August 1847, his first appearance in London as Florizel in The Winter's Tale. In 1850 he married Sarah Mary Vertigan Stubbs.

=== Olympic Theatre ===
In 1853 Vining was with Alfred Wigan at the Olympic Theatre, where he remained for several years. In Tom Taylor's Still Waters Run Deep he was, in May 1855, the first Captain Hawksley. He played Charles Surface in Sheridan's The School for Scandal; was in February 1856 the original Frank Lauriston in Stay at Home, an adaptation by Slingsby Lawrence (G. H. Lewes) of Un Mari qui se dérange; and in March 1857 the original Charles in Daddy Hardacre, by Palgrave Simpson, an adaptation of La Fille de l'Avare.

In August 1857 Vining spoke a prologue at the opening of the Olympic Theatre under the management of Robson and Emden. In April 1858 he was Colonel Clive in John Oxenford's Doubtful Victory; in June Captain Hardingham in Tom Taylor's Going to the Bad; in December Stephen Scatter in Oxenford's Porter's Knot; in September Sir Edward Ardent in Charles Dance's A Morning Call, taken from Musset. He also played Wildrake in a revival of The Love Chase by James Sheridan Knowles.

During 1862 he was manager of St James's Theatre after the departure of Alfred Wigan; in January of that year he played the hero of Self-made, his own adaptation of Le Chevalier de St Georges, and in March Mr Union in Friends or Foes, adapted by Horace Wigan from Nos Intimes by Victorien Sardou.

=== Princess's Theatre ===
From 1863 Vining was manager of the Princess's Theatre. in June of that year he was Mercutio to the Juliet of Stella Colas. He was the first Richard Goldsworthy in Watts Phillips's Paul's Return in March 1864. In quick succession he was one of the Antipholuses in a revival of The Comedy of Errors by the Brothers Webb; Philip II, an original part in Oxenford's Monastery of St Just; and Badger the detective – his most popular creation – in Boucicault's The Streets of London in August.

=== London premiere of It Is Never Too Late to Mend ===
He produced in October 1865 the first London staging of Charles Reade's It Is Never Too Late to Mend, playing Tom Robinson. Stanislaus Calhaem, who had played Jacky in the original production in Leeds, repeated the role here. At the first performance on 4 October, some of the audience denounced the second part of the drama ("Prison Life"); there were loud cries of "Shame, shame" and "Off, off"; several men got up in the stalls and called upon Mr Vining to come forward and apologize for introducing such scenes upon the stage. He declared that he had produced the play on a high principle.

Frederick Guest Tomlins, theatre critic of the Morning Advertiser. harangued against the brutal realism of some of the scenes, writing "... we ourselves denounced the introduction of so complex a question as prison discipline into a melodrama, especially backed up as it is by such dismal and revolting representations of horrors...." (Morning Advertiser, 5 October 1865).

The succeeding act entirely restored the equanimity of the audience.

=== Later years and retirement ===
In July 1867 he played an original part in The Huguenot Captain by Watts Phillips, of which Adelaide Neilson was the heroine, and in August 1868 a second in Boucicault's After Dark. He was the first Bullhead, to Charles Mathews's Gentleman Jack, in Escaped from Portland, in October 1869. In November of that year he went bankrupt, and his management of the Princess's Theatre ended; he was discharged the following February.

After his retirement from management Vining played, at the Olympic in October 1871, Count Fosco in the first production of Wilkie Collins's The Woman in White, which was a great success. He died in Reading, Berkshire on 17 December 1875. John Joseph Knight wrote: "He was a respectable actor, not in the first class."
