= Clifton, Kansas =

City in Kansas, United States

- City
- Location within Washington County and Kansas

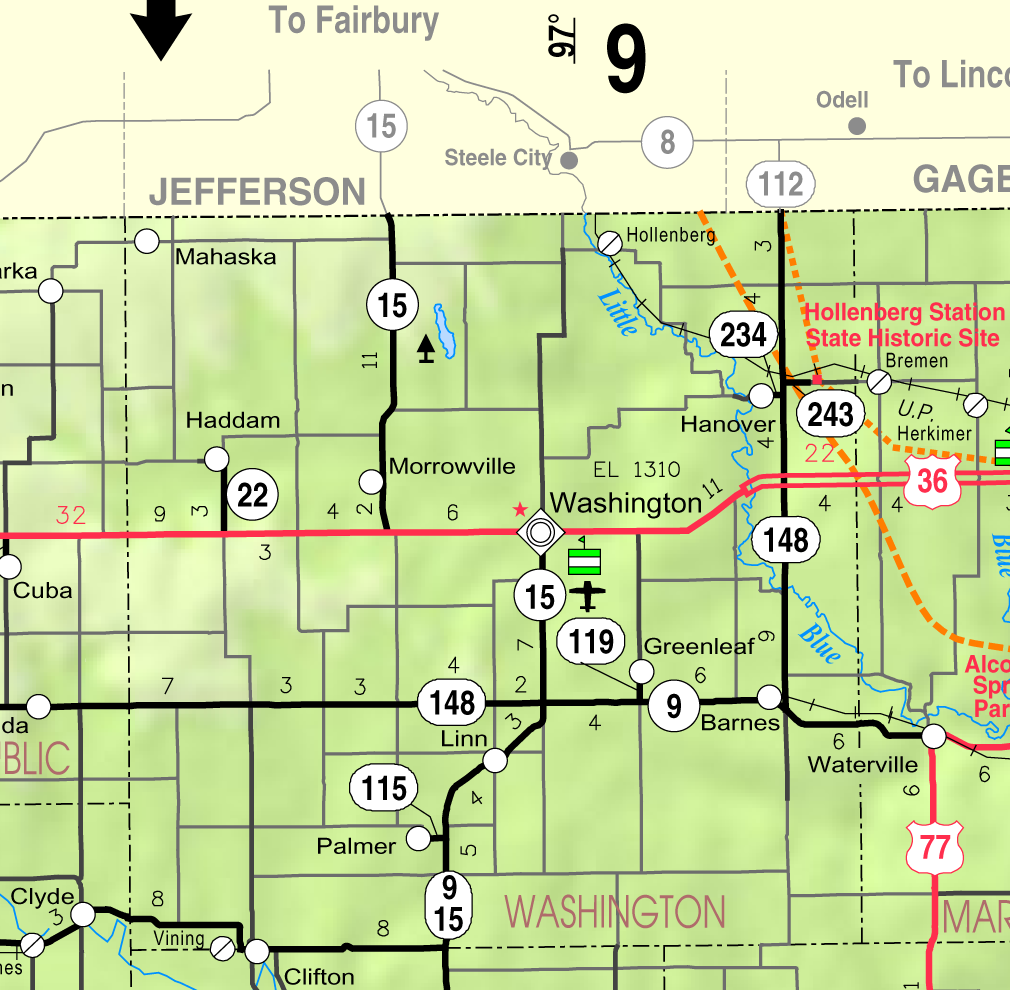
- KDOT map of Washington County (legend)
- Coordinates: 39°34′05″N 97°16′50″W
- Country: United States
- State: Kansas
- Counties: Clay, Washington
- Founded: 1870
- Incorporated: 1884

Area
  - Total: 0.41 sq mi (1.06 km^{2})
  - Land: 0.41 sq mi (1.06 km^{2})
  - Water: 0 sq mi (0.00 km^{2})
- Elevation: 1,293 ft (394 m)

Population (2020)
  - Total: 454
  - Density: 1,110/sq mi (428/km^{2})
- Time zone: UTC-6 (CST)
  - Summer (DST): UTC-5 (CDT)
- ZIP Code: 66937
- Area code: 785
- FIPS code: 20-14200
- GNIS ID: 2393563
- Website: cityofcliftonkansas.com

Clifton is a city in Clay and Washington counties in the U.S. state of Kansas. As of the 2020 census, the population of the city was 454.

== History ==
Clifton was founded in 1870, and bears the name of a surveyor who had platted the original town in 1859. (Note: The first building erected in the original town was a one-room log hut that served the pioneers who settled there as a fort during troubled times between them and the area's Indians. Clifton and Fort Clifton ended up occupying several locations. In 1860 Clifton was moved just to the north and ended up just inside Washington County, Kansas. A number of log cabins were built there by the settlers, so they could take refuge there during Indian uprisings. In 1861 and 1862 school was held in one of the cabins.)

Clifton was an important shipping point located at the junction of three railroads.

== Geography ==
According to the United States Census Bureau, the city has a total area of 0.41 square miles (1.06 km^{2}), all land. The city is located adjacent to Vining.

== Demographics ==
Historical population
Census	Pop.	Note	%±
1880	142		—
1890	622		338.0%
1900	609		−2.1%
1910	614		0.8%
1920	631		2.8%
1930	713		13.0%
1940	670		−6.0%
1950	743		10.9%
1960	746		0.4%
1970	718		−3.8%
1980	695		−3.2%
1990	492		−29.2%
2000	557		13.2%
2010	554		−0.5%
2020	454		−18.1%
U.S. Decennial Census

=== 2020 census ===
The 2020 United States census counted 454 people, 192 households, and 116 families in Clifton. The population density was 1,112.7 per square mile (429.6/km^{2}). There were 244 housing units at an average density of 598.0 per square mile (230.9/km^{2}). The racial makeup was 98.68% (448) white or European American (98.24% non-Hispanic white), 0.0% (0) black or African-American, 0.0% (0) Native American or Alaska Native, 0.0% (0) Asian, 0.0% (0) Pacific Islander or Native Hawaiian, 0.0% (0) from other races, and 1.32% (6) from two or more races. Hispanic or Latino of any race was 0.66% (3) of the population.

Of the 192 households, 27.1% had children under the age of 18; 52.6% were married couples living together; 22.9% had a female householder with no spouse or partner present. 35.4% of households consisted of individuals and 21.9% had someone living alone who was 65 years of age or older. The average household size was 1.9 and the average family size was 2.3. The percent of those with a bachelor's degree or higher was estimated to be 11.9% of the population.

27.3% of the population was under the age of 18, 6.4% from 18 to 24, 22.0% from 25 to 44, 21.6% from 45 to 64, and 22.7% who were 65 years of age or older. The median age was 41.1 years. For every 100 females, there were 100.9 males. For every 100 females ages 18 and older, there were 100.0 males.

The 2016–2020 5-year American Community Survey estimates show that the median household income was $41,250 (with a margin of error of +/- $8,888) and the median family income was $51,250 (+/- $21,649). Males had a median income of $36,563 (+/- $4,157) versus $18,750 (+/- $6,295) for females. The median income for those above 16 years old was $26,369 (+/- $2,247). Approximately, 12.3% of families and 13.2% of the population were below the poverty line, including 25.6% of those under the age of 18 and 20.4% of those ages 65 or over.

=== 2010 census ===
As of the census of 2010, there were 554 people, 232 households, and 145 families residing in the city. The population density was 1,351.2 inhabitants per square mile (521.7/km^{2}). There were 262 housing units at an average density of 639.0 per square mile (246.7/km^{2}). The racial makeup of the city was 98.6% White, 0.4% African American, 0.2% Native American, 0.5% from other races, and 0.4% from two or more races. Hispanic or Latino of any race were 1.1% of the population.

There were 232 households, of which 26.3% had children under the age of 18 living with them, 53.9% were married couples living together, 5.6% had a female householder with no husband present, 3.0% had a male householder with no wife present, and 37.5% were non-families. 34.5% of all households were made up of individuals, and 19.8% had someone living alone who was 65 years of age or older. The average household size was 2.30 and the average family size was 2.99.

The median age in the city was 46 years. 22.4% of residents were under the age of 18; 7.3% were between the ages of 18 and 24; 18.5% were from 25 to 44; 26.9% were from 45 to 64; and 25.1% were 65 years of age or older. The gender makeup of the city was 48.7% male and 51.3% female.

=== 2000 census ===
As of the census of 2000, there were 557 people, 240 households, and 149 families residing in the city. The population density was 1,378.7 inhabitants per square mile (532.3/km^{2}). There were 278 housing units at an average density of 688.1 per square mile (265.7/km^{2}). The racial makeup of the city was 98.74% White, 0.54% Native American, and 0.72% from two or more races.

There were 240 households, out of which 28.8% had children under the age of 18 living with them, 52.1% were married couples living together, 6.7% had a female householder with no husband present, and 37.9% were non-families. 35.4% of all households were made up of individuals, and 22.5% had someone living alone who was 65 years of age or older. The average household size was 2.32 and the average family size was 3.06.

In the city, the population was spread out, with 26.6% under the age of 18, 7.5% from 18 to 24, 21.9% from 25 to 44, 20.1% from 45 to 64, and 23.9% who were 65 years of age or older. The median age was 39 years. For every 100 females, there were 86.3 males. For every 100 females age 18 and over, there were 77.8 males.

The median income for a household in the city was $21,750, and the median income for a family was $34,375. Males had a median income of $26,458 versus $16,167 for females. The per capita income for the city was $13,962. About 16.2% of families and 21.0% of the population were below the poverty line, including 26.1% of those under age 18 and 28.5% of those age 65 or over.

== Education ==
The community is served by Clifton-Clyde USD 224 public school district, which has three schools:

- Clifton-Clyde Senior High School, located in Clyde.
- Clifton-Clyde Middle School, located in Clifton.
- Clifton-Clyde Grade School, located in Clifton.

The Clifton-Clyde High School mascot is Eagles. Prior to school unification in 1981, the Clifton High School mascot was Cardinals.

The Clifton Cardinals won the Kansas State High School class 1A Football championship in 1969.

== Notable people ==
- William Henderson, painter, architect, and furniture designer.
- Robert McAlmon, author, poet, and publisher.

== See also ==
- Central Branch Union Pacific Railroad
