= Hotel Royal =

Hotel Royal or Hotel Royale may refer to:

== Hotels ==
- Hotel Royal, a hotel chain in Southeast Asia; a subsidiary of Nikko Hotels
- Hotel Royal, Aarhus, Denmark
- Hotel Royal, Copenhagen, Denmark
- Hôtel Royale, Eleftherias Square, Thessalonika, Greece
- Hotel Royal, Bahadur Bhawan, Kathmandu, Nepal
- Hotel Royal Christiania, Oslo, Norway
- Hotel Royal (Bangkok), Bangkok, Thailand
- Hotel Royal, New York City, New York State, U.S.A.; the location of the Hotel Royal fire
- Hotel Royal, Berlin, former hotel in Berlin-Mitte at streetcorner Unter den Linden/Wilhelmstraße

== Fictional hotels ==
- Hotel Royale, a fictional hotel from the Star Trek: The Next Generation TV episode "The Royale"
- Hotel Royale, a fictional hotel from the British TV show The Ghostbusters of East Finchley

== Arts, entertainment, media ==
- Hotel Royal (film), a 1969 German television film directed by Wolfgang Becker
- Hotel Royale (film) (Japanese: ホテルローヤル), a 2020 Japanese film based on the Shino Sakuragi short story; see List of Japanese films of 2020
  - Hotel Royale (book) (Japanese: ホテルローヤル), a 2013 short story anthology collection by Shino Sakuragi
  - Hotel Royale (short story) (Japanese: ホテルローヤル), a short story by Shino Sakuragi collected in the eponymous 2013 anthology and basis of the 2020 film
- Hotel Royale (album), a 1998 album by Amanda Strydom
- Hotel Royale, an in-universe detective novel from the Star Trek: The Next Generation TV episode "The Royale"

== See also ==
- Corinthia Hotel Budapest, Budapest, Hungary; formerly, the "Grand Hotel Royal"
- Royal Plaza (disambiguation)
- Royal Hotel (disambiguation)
