= Vinings =

Vinings may refer to:

- Vinings, Georgia, a village in Georgia, United States
- Vinings Mountain, or Mount Wilkinson, in Georgia, United States
