= Royal Valley =

Royal Valley or variation, may refer to:

- Royal Valley High School, Hoyt, Kansas, USA
- Royal Valley Unified School District, Jackson County, Kansas, USA; see Jackson County, Kansas

== See also ==
- Valley Royals Track & Field Club, Abbotsford, BC, Canada
- Valley (disambiguation)
- Royal (disambiguation)
- Vale Royal (disambiguation)
- Royal Gorge (disambiguation)
- Valley of the Kings (disambiguation)
