= Royal Township =

Royal Township may refer to:

- Royal Township, White County, Arkansas, in White County, Arkansas
- Royal Township, Ford County, Kansas
- Royal Township, Lincoln County, Minnesota
- Royal Township, Antelope County, Nebraska
- Royal Township, Ramsey County, North Dakota, in Ramsey County, North Dakota
