= Vining, Kansas =

City in Clay and Washington Counties in Kansas

- City
- Location within Washington County and Kansas

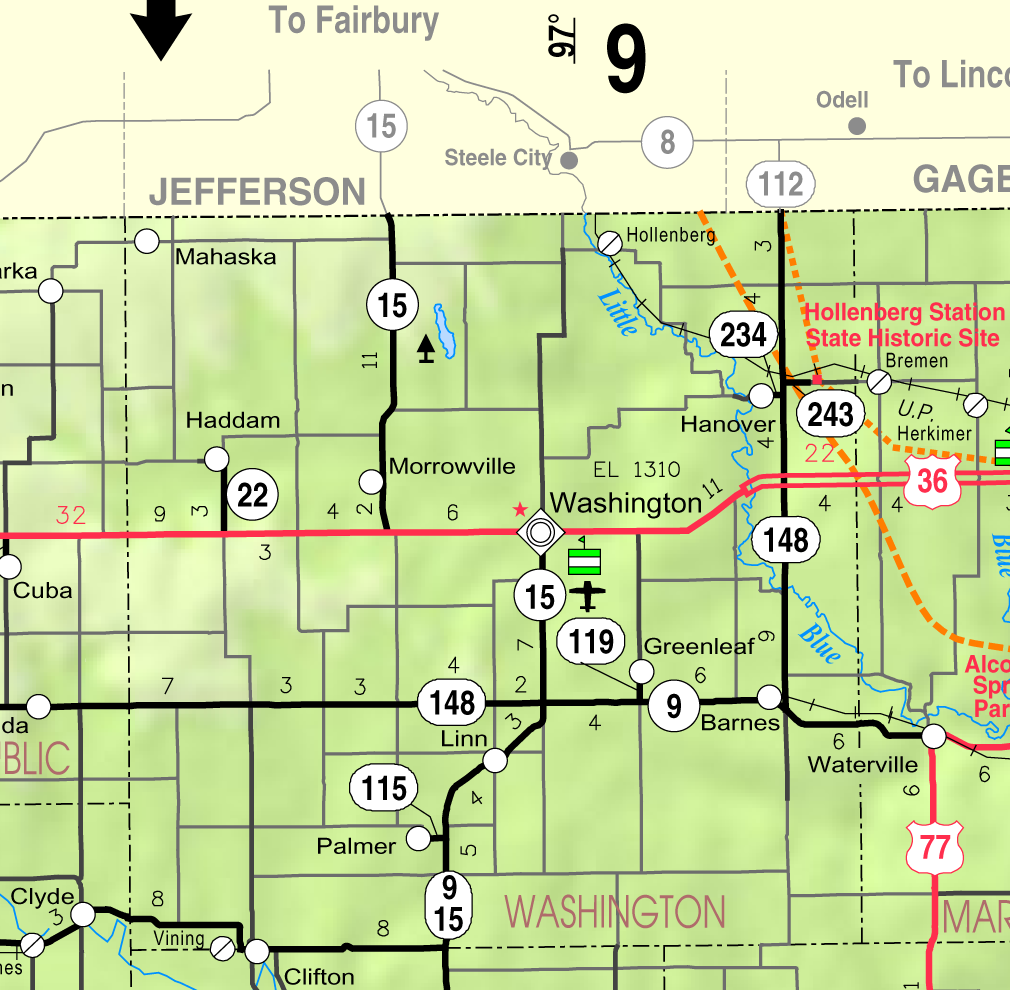
- KDOT map of Washington County (legend)
- Coordinates: 39°34′02″N 97°17′37″W
- Country: United States
- State: Kansas
- Counties: Clay, Washington
- Platted: 1877 (West Clifton)
- Incorporated: 1885

Area
  - Total: 0.21 sq mi (0.55 km^{2})
  - Land: 0.21 sq mi (0.55 km^{2})
  - Water: 0 sq mi (0.00 km^{2})
- Elevation: 1,273 ft (388 m)

Population (2020)
  - Total: 43
  - Density: 200/sq mi (78/km^{2})
- Time zone: UTC-6 (CST)
  - Summer (DST): UTC-5 (CDT)
- Area code: 785
- FIPS code: 20-73950
- GNIS ID: 2397147

Vining is a city in Clay and Washington counties in Kansas, United States. As of the 2020 census, the population of the city was 43.

== History ==
Vining was originally called West Clifton, and under the latter name was laid out in 1877. It was renamed Vining in 1881, in honor of E. P. Vining, a railroad agent.

Vining was once an important shipping point, being situated on the Republican River and at the junction of two railroads.

The post office in Vining closed in 1955.

== Geography ==
According to the United States Census Bureau, the city has a total area of 0.22 square miles (0.57 km^{2}), all land. The city is located next to Clifton.

== Demographics ==
Historical population
Census	Pop.	Note	%±
1890	241		—
1900	245		1.7%
1910	191		−22.0%
1920	183		−4.2%
1930	198		8.2%
1940	188		−5.1%
1950	168		−10.6%
1960	128		−23.8%
1970	84		−34.4%
1980	85		1.2%
1990	55		−35.3%
2000	58		5.5%
2010	45		−22.4%
2020	43		−4.4%
U.S. Decennial Census

=== 2010 census ===
As of the census of 2010, there were 45 people, 24 households, and 13 families living in the city. The population density was 204.5 inhabitants per square mile (79.0/km^{2}). There were 27 housing units at an average density of 122.7 per square mile (47.4/km^{2}). The racial makeup of the city was 100.0% White.

There were 24 households, of which 25.0% had children under the age of 18 living with them, 33.3% were married couples living together, 4.2% had a female householder with no husband present, 16.7% had a male householder with no wife present, and 45.8% were non-families. 41.7% of all households were made up of individuals, and 20.8% had someone living alone who was 65 years of age or older. The average household size was 1.88 and the average family size was 2.54.

The median age in the city was 41.5 years. 20% of residents were under the age of 18; 6.6% were between the ages of 18 and 24; 31% were from 25 to 44; 28.9% were from 45 to 64; and 13.3% were 65 years of age or older. The gender makeup of the city was 57.8% male and 42.2% female.

=== 2000 census ===
As of the census of 2000, there were 58 people, 26 households, and 15 families living in the city. The population density was 260.1 inhabitants per square mile (100.4/km^{2}). There were 29 housing units at an average density of 130.0 per square mile (50.2/km^{2}). The racial makeup of the city was 98.28% White and 1.72% Native American.

There were 26 households, out of which 23.1% had children under the age of 18 living with them, 50.0% were married couples living together, 3.8% had a female householder with no husband present, and 42.3% were non-families. 38.5% of all households were made up of individuals, and 11.5% had someone living alone who was 65 years of age or older. The average household size was 2.23 and the average family size was 3.07.

In the city, the population was spread out, with 25.9% under the age of 18, 6.9% from 18 to 24, 19.0% from 25 to 44, 36.2% from 45 to 64, and 12.1% who were 65 years of age or older. The median age was 40 years. For every 100 females, there were 100.0 males. For every 100 females age 18 and over, there were 126.3 males.

The median income for a household in the city was $27,500, and the median income for a family was $28,750. Males had a median income of $28,750 versus $8,750 for females. The per capita income for the city was $26,924. There were no families and 2.2% of the population living below the poverty line, including no under eighteens and none of those over 64.

== Education ==
The community is served by Clifton-Clyde USD 224 public school district, which has three schools:

- Clifton-Clyde Senior High School, located in Clyde.
- Clifton-Clyde Middle School, located in Clifton.
- Clifton-Clyde Grade School, located in Clifton.
