= The Palladium Niteclub =

Nightclub in Christchurch, New Zealand

Palladium Nightclub
- Address: Chancery Lane
- Location: Christchurch Central City

Construction
- Opened: 1986
- Closed: 2000

The Palladium Niteclub was a nightclub in the city of Christchurch, New Zealand, which shared the same name as the famous Palladium in New York City. It opened in 1986 as part of the MacKenzie group. The Palladium was the first night club in Christchurch city to include a full laser lightshow. It was also the largest nightclub in Christchurch with a capacity of about 800 people (this capacity was increased in 1996 after some renovation work). As the largest club in Christchurch, the Palladium was frequented by several international acts. During their 1986 tour of New Zealand, Simple Minds spent the evening there after their show at the Christchurch Town Hall.

== History ==
The Palladium's sound system was purpose built through consultation with local band promoter Mel Blokhuis of Ex-Ray Staging, and was run with no major modifications through the life of the club. Unlike other clubs in Christchurch, the Palladium was open 7 nights per week and was one of the first to adopt the new 24-hour liquor licence, although in practice the club generally operated from 9 pm – 7am.

Shane Darren and Dwight Caldwell were the Palladium's first resident DJs. Their residencies ran from 1986 to 1989. The first resident band was Big Game Hunters, who performed four nights per week until their residency ended in 1989. The Palladium played host to many of Christchurch city's leading bands and DJs. The common practice was for bands to play 30-minute sets of popular, dance styled music alternating with a resident DJ who would play a mix of electronic dance music (for example, house music) and popular chart tracks. The music style evolved through the history of The Palladium to match popular demand. In 1992, resident DJ Adam Ward regularly played a mix of popular Hip Hop tracks (for example songs by Snap, and Technotronic, and Kriss Kross "Jump").

Music was played on Technics 1200 turntables through the life of the club. From the mid 1990s DJs also used the early model Pioneer CDJ 500 CD players.

During 1996, changing night club trends forced the Palladium to cancel its contract with resident band, Shaka Groove, and run exclusively with the resident DJs Rob Munro (aka theRobsta) and Brent Silby (aka Maestro B). This change boosted the Palladium's popularity until a change of management late in 1997, which resulted in the cancellation of the DJs and the introduction of a new resident DJ.

In February 2000 The Palladium was leased to John Stanton MBE for a short time and renamed Illusions. A year later, due to continued losses, Illusions was placed in receivership. The venue (and adjacent Chancery complex) was sold to David Henderson at which time Stanton's lease was terminated. The nightclub was re-themed, with involvement from Terry Brown and Christchurch mayoral candidate George Balani, as a revue bar. The club was later rebranded as The Dolls House revue bar.

The Palladium Niteclub was located in Chancery Lane, an alleyway off Cathedral Square in the city centre. The whole city block was demolished after the 2011 Christchurch earthquake to makes room for the Convention Centre Precinct.

== Resident DJs ==
- Shane Darren (1986–1989)
- Dwight Cardwell (1986–1991)
- Ian Avery aka Birdman (1988-1991)
- Glen Edmondson (1991–1992)
- Andy Green (1992)
- Adam Ward Dj-A (1992–1994)
- Carl aka Beefy C (1994–1995)
- Greg Campbell (1995–1996)
- Rob Munro aka theRobsta (1995 – September 1997)
- Brent Silby aka Maestro B (1995 – September 1997)
- Dale Svensson (September 1997 – February 2000 Palladium, February 2000 – April 2001 Illusions)

== Resident bands ==
- Big Game Hunters (1986–1988)
  - Band members: Tracey Birnie (Vocals), Steve Ward (Drums) Craig Becconsall (Bass) David Rudder (Guitar) Ken Wells (keys), Phil Allen (Keys) Nick Buchanan (Drums). Big Game Hunters opened the Palladium and played 3 years straight, 4 nights a week.
- Metro (1988)
- The Pop Mechanix (1988)
- Big Trouble (1988–1989)
  - Band members: Peter "Rooda" Warren, Paul "Ace" Mason, and Paul Scott
- Big Sky (1989–1990)
  - Band members: Greg Sneddon (vocals), Deb Woods (Vocals), Jessie White (drums),
- Fahrenheit (1990–1991)
  - Band members: Greg Sneddon (vocals)
- Tango Palace (1991–1992)
  - Band members: Greg Sneddon (vocals) Jackie (Vocals), Steve Days (Keys), Steve Hyde (Bass)
- Divine Thing (1992–1994)
  - Band members: Greg Sneddon (vocals), Greg Mannering (bass, vocals), Steve Andrews (guitar), Tom Berteis (drums)
- Juicy Jam (1994)
  - Band members: Tracey Birnie (Vocals), Leslie Birnie (Vocals), Brother H (Vocals)
- Shaka Groove (1995–1997)
  - Band members: Pearl Runga (Vocals), Brother H (Vocals), Trudi Wilson (Vocals), Chris Muangututia (Vocals), Andrew McMillan (Keyboards/Programming)

== Resident lighting technicians ==
- Brent Watson (1985–1989) (built, maintained and operated lighting/tech)
- Jason Akehurst (1994-1997)

== Resident door staff ==
- David Trowbridge (1997–2000)
- Mike Richardson (1997–2000)
- Jason McKnight (1998–2000)
- Francis Kokiri (1998–2000)
- Dump Truck (1995–1998)
- Simon Sweet (1999)
- Tim Mcilroy (1995-1998)

== See also ==
- List of electronic dance music venues
