= Fort Clifton (Kansas) =

Fort Clifton was a 19th-century fort in Kansas. It was built in August 1862 by settlers from the area to protect themselves from Native Americans. Near the old site of Clifton (west of the present town of Clifton at the border of Clay and Washington Counties), it was occupied until 1863. (Note: Events concerning Fort Clifton are uncertain, as all available sources disagree concerning the details of the fort. One source claimed a new fort was built on the original townsite in August 1862 and that this fort was used until 1863. Other sources indicate whatever fort and cabins that existed were used until 1863 or 1864 or even until spring 1865. To make matters more confusing, the townsite moved in 1863, either back to the original site or to a place near to it. The use of Fort Clifton definitely ended at the winter of 1865-6, as the problems with the Indians subsided then.)
