= Clyde, Kansas =

City in Cloud County, Kansas

- City
- Location within Cloud County and Kansas

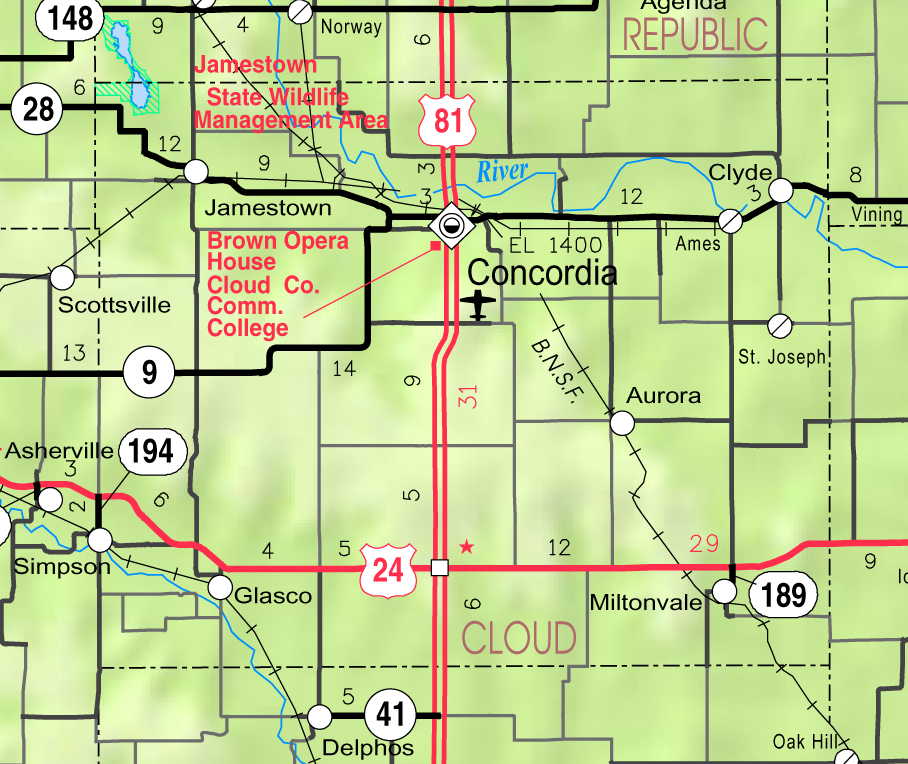
- KDOT map of Cloud County (legend)
- Coordinates: 39°35′31″N 97°24′01″W
- Country: United States
- State: Kansas
- County: Cloud
- Founded: 1867
- Platted: 1867
- Incorporated: 1869

Area
  - Total: 0.67 sq mi (1.74 km^{2})
  - Land: 0.67 sq mi (1.74 km^{2})
  - Water: 0 sq mi (0.00 km^{2})
- Elevation: 1,299 ft (396 m)

Population (2020)
  - Total: 694
  - Density: 1,030/sq mi (399/km^{2})
- Time zone: UTC-6 (CST)
  - Summer (DST): UTC-5 (CDT)
- ZIP Code: 66938
- Area code: 785
- FIPS code: 20-14475
- GNIS ID: 2393578
- Website: clydekansas.org

Clyde is a city in Cloud County, Kansas, United States. As of the 2020 census, the population of the city was 694. It is located east of Concordia along state highway K-9.

== History ==
Clyde was laid out in 1867 in Elk Township, making it the oldest town in Cloud County. It was named after the River Clyde in Scotland, or according to another source, it was named for Clyde, Ohio (which also is named indirectly for the River Clyde).

Clyde experienced growth in 1877 when the Central Branch Railroad was built through it.

== Geography ==
According to the United States Census Bureau, the city has a total area of 0.67 square miles (1.74 km^{2}), all land.

== Demographics ==
Historical population
Census	Pop.	Note	%±
1880	956		—
1890	1,137		18.9%
1900	1,157		1.8%
1910	1,057		−8.6%
1920	1,063		0.6%
1930	1,174		10.4%
1940	1,060		−9.7%
1950	1,067		0.7%
1960	1,025		−3.9%
1970	946		−7.7%
1980	909		−3.9%
1990	793		−12.8%
2000	740		−6.7%
2010	716		−3.2%
2020	694		−3.1%
U.S. Decennial Census

=== 2020 census ===
The 2020 United States census counted 694 people, 287 households, and 181 families in Clyde. The population density was 1,031.2 per square mile (398.1/km^{2}). There were 351 housing units at an average density of 521.5 per square mile (201.4/km^{2}). The racial makeup was 95.53% (663) white or European American (95.53% non-Hispanic white), 0.0% (0) black or African-American, 0.86% (6) Native American or Alaska Native, 0.0% (0) Asian, 0.0% (0) Pacific Islander or Native Hawaiian, 0.0% (0) from other races, and 3.6% (25) from two or more races. Hispanic or Latino of any race was 0.29% (2) of the population.

Of the 287 households, 27.9% had children under the age of 18; 51.6% were married couples living together; 25.1% had a female householder with no spouse or partner present. 31.7% of households consisted of individuals and 18.8% had someone living alone who was 65 years of age or older. The average household size was 2.3 and the average family size was 2.8. The percent of those with a bachelor's degree or higher was estimated to be 17.7% of the population.

23.2% of the population was under the age of 18, 5.5% from 18 to 24, 19.3% from 25 to 44, 23.6% from 45 to 64, and 28.4% who were 65 years of age or older. The median age was 47.6 years. For every 100 females, there were 112.9 males. For every 100 females ages 18 and older, there were 108.2 males.

The 2016–2020 5-year American Community Survey estimates show that the median household income was $46,875 (with a margin of error of +/- $6,255) and the median family income was $60,208 (+/- $19,311). Males had a median income of $39,250 (+/- $7,680) versus $19,844 (+/- $11,777) for females. The median income for those above 16 years old was $32,009 (+/- $4,466). Approximately, 10.0% of families and 12.6% of the population were below the poverty line, including 17.9% of those under the age of 18 and 9.2% of those ages 65 or over.

=== 2010 census ===
As of the census of 2010, there were 716 people, 297 households, and 194 families residing in the city. The population density was 1,068.7 inhabitants per square mile (412.6/km^{2}). There were 370 housing units at an average density of 552.2 per square mile (213.2/km^{2}). The racial makeup of the city was 97.8% White, 0.3% African American, 0.3% Asian, 0.3% from other races, and 1.4% from two or more races. Hispanic or Latino of any race were 0.7% of the population.

There were 297 households, of which 26.9% had children under the age of 18 living with them, 56.6% were married couples living together, 4.0% had a female householder with no husband present, 4.7% had a male householder with no wife present, and 34.7% were non-families. 30.3% of all households were made up of individuals, and 17.9% had someone living alone who was 65 years of age or older. The average household size was 2.31 and the average family size was 2.90.

The median age in the city was 46.7 years. 22.8% of residents were under the age of 18; 6.6% were between the ages of 18 and 24; 19% were from 25 to 44; 25.1% were from 45 to 64; and 26.5% were 65 years of age or older. The gender makeup of the city was 47.9% male and 52.1% female.

== Education ==
The community is served by Clifton-Clyde USD 224 public school district, which has three schools:

- Clifton-Clyde Senior High School, located in Clyde.
- Clifton-Clyde Middle School, located in Clifton.
- Clifton-Clyde Grade School, located in Clifton.

The Clifton-Clyde High School mascot is Eagles. Prior to school unification in 1981, the Clyde High School mascot was Bluejays.

The Clyde Bluejays won the Kansas State High School 1A Football championship in 1977, and the boys 1A Basketball championship in 1979.

== Notable people ==
- George Dockins, Major League Baseball pitcher for the St. Louis Cardinals (1945) and Brooklyn Dodgers (1947).
- Louise Davis McMahon (1873–1966), philanthropist
- Louis M. Mollier (1846–1911), pioneer Roman Catholic priest for the Vicariate of Kansas (1874–1876), Diocese of Leavenworth (1877–1887), and Diocese of Concordia (later Salina) (1887–1911).

== See also ==
- National Register of Historic Places listings in Cloud County, Kansas
  - Charles W. Van De Mark House – currently a private residence, is listed on the National Register of Historic Places
- Central Branch Union Pacific Railroad
- Concordia Blade-Empire
