= Royal Library =

Royal Library can mean:

- Royal Library of Alexandria - the renowned ancient library of Alexandria
- Royal Library, Windsor - the royal library of the Sovereign of the United Kingdom
- Danish Royal Library - the national library of Denmark
- Royal Library of the Netherlands - the national library of The Netherlands
- Bibliothèque Royale de Belgique, Royal Library of Belgium, the national library in Brussels
- Swedish Royal Library - the national library of Sweden
- Royal Library of Turin - formerly the library of the Kings of Italy
- Royal manuscripts, British Library, the old royal collections, given by George III in 1757
- Bibliothèque du roi, the predecessor of the Bibliothèque nationale de France
