= Glasco, Kansas =

City in Cloud County, Kansas

- City
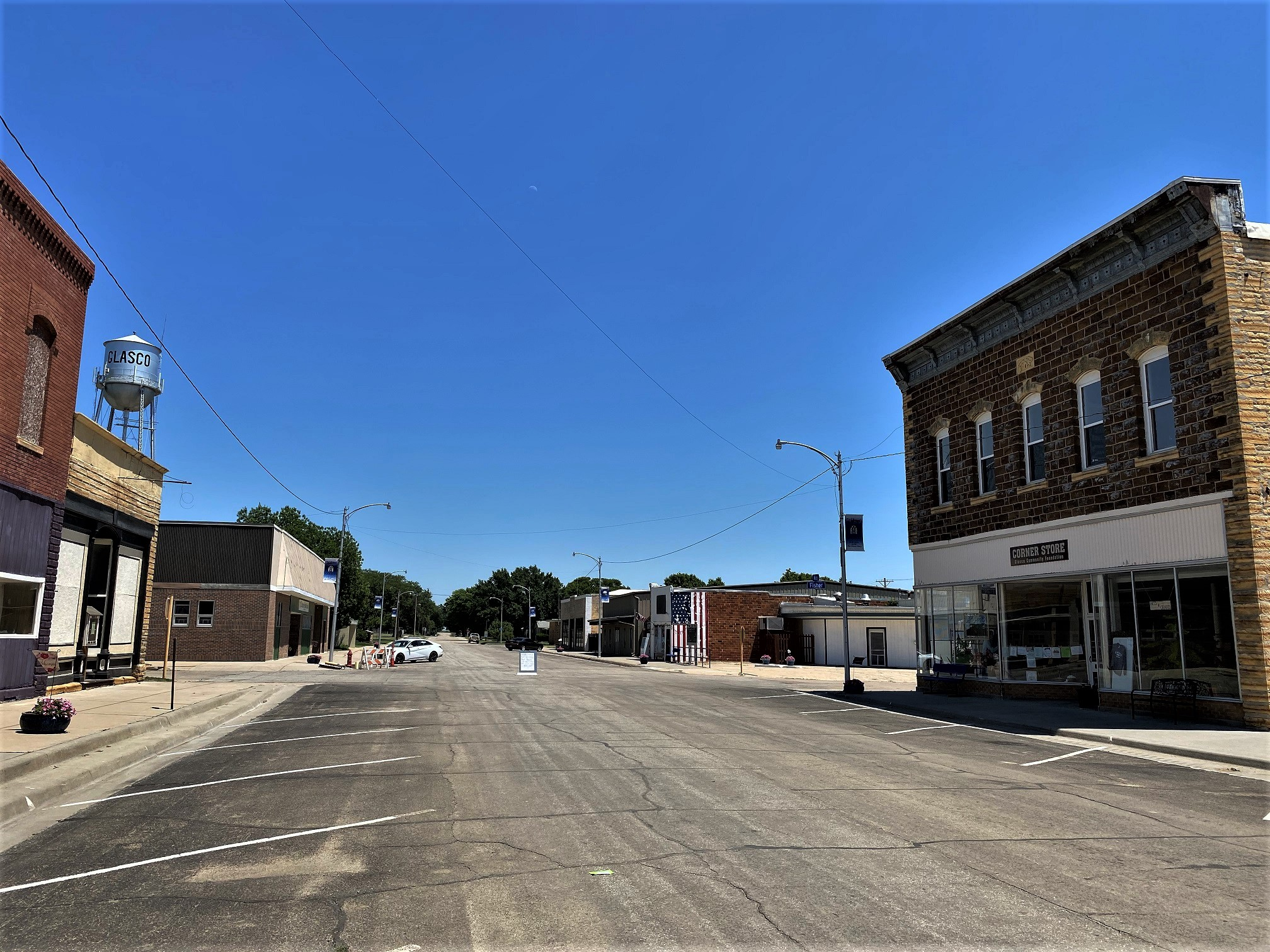
- Glasco downtown (2021)

- Location within Cloud County and Kansas

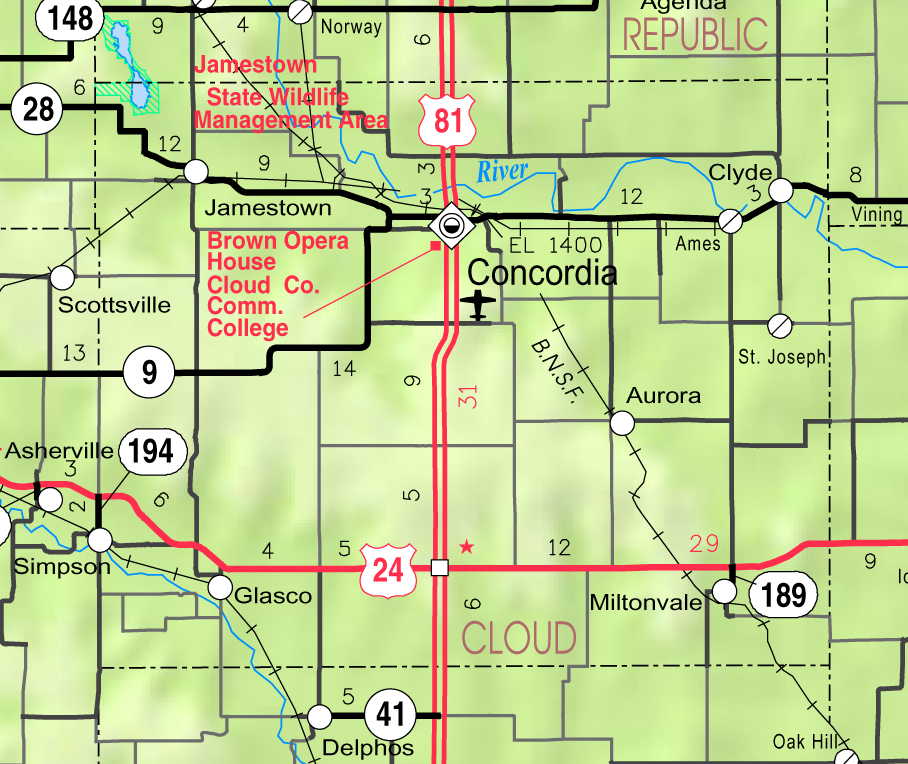
- KDOT map of Cloud County (legend)
- Coordinates: 39°21′40″N 97°50′13″W
- Country: United States
- State: Kansas
- County: Cloud
- Founded: 1870
- Incorporated: 1886
- Named for: Glasgow, Scotland

Area
  - Total: 0.33 sq mi (0.86 km^{2})
  - Land: 0.33 sq mi (0.86 km^{2})
  - Water: 0 sq mi (0.00 km^{2})
- Elevation: 1,326 ft (404 m)

Population (2020)
  - Total: 441
  - Density: 1,300/sq mi (510/km^{2})
- Time zone: UTC-6 (CST)
  - Summer (DST): UTC-5 (CDT)
- ZIP Code: 67445
- Area code: 785
- FIPS code: 20-26375
- GNIS ID: 2394908
- Website: glascokansas.org

Glasco is a city in Cloud County, Kansas, United States. As of the 2020 census, the population of the city was 441.

== History ==
Glasco was originally called Del Ray, and under the latter name was laid out and platted in 1870. The name Glasco was adopted officially by the Kansas legislature in 1878 and incorporated as a city of the third class April 14, 1886, and named after Glasgow, Scotland. Glasco was a shipping point on the Union Pacific railroad.

=== Historic sites ===
This small town has two items of interest on the National Register of Historic Places: Pott's Ford Bridge is located just 1/2 mile south of the city limits, and the entire downtown business district has also earned a listing on the register.

== Geography ==
According to the United States Census Bureau, the city has a total area of 0.33 square miles (0.85 km^{2}), all land.

=== Climate ===
The climate in this area is characterized by hot, humid summers and generally mild to cool winters. According to the Köppen Climate Classification system, Glasco has a humid subtropical climate, abbreviated "Cfa" on climate maps.

Climate data for Glasco, Kansas
Month	Jan	Feb	Mar	Apr	May	Jun	Jul	Aug	Sep	Oct	Nov	Dec	Year
Average precipitation inches	0.70	1.00	1.90	2.50	4.40	2.90	3.60	3.10	2.6	2.10	1.20	0.80	26.8
Average precipitation mm	17.8	25.4	48.3	63.5	111.8	73.7	91.4	78.7	66	53.3	30.5	20.3	680.7
Mean daily daylight hours	10.3	11.2	12.5	13.8	14.9	15.4	15.1	14.1	12.9	11.6	10.5	9.9	12.7
Source: Weatherbase

== Demographics ==
Historical population
Census	Pop.	Note	%±
1880	207		—
1890	461		122.7%
1900	509		10.4%
1910	720		41.5%
1920	724		0.6%
1930	707		−2.3%
1940	741		4.8%
1950	803		8.4%
1960	812		1.1%
1970	767		−5.5%
1980	710		−7.4%
1990	556		−21.7%
2000	536		−3.6%
2010	498		−7.1%
2020	441		−11.4%
U.S. Decennial Census

=== 2020 census ===
The 2020 United States census counted 441 people, 188 households, and 101 families in Glasco. The population density was 1,328.3 per square mile (512.9/km^{2}). There were 269 housing units at an average density of 810.2 per square mile (312.8/km^{2}). The racial makeup was 97.05% (428) white or European American (97.05% non-Hispanic white), 0.0% (0) black or African-American, 0.23% (1) Native American or Alaska Native, 0.45% (2) Asian, 0.0% (0) Pacific Islander or Native Hawaiian, 0.0% (0) from other races, and 2.27% (10) from two or more races. Hispanic or Latino of any race was 0.23% (1) of the population.

Of the 188 households, 19.1% had children under the age of 18; 43.1% were married couples living together; 22.3% had a female householder with no spouse or partner present. 36.7% of households consisted of individuals and 20.2% had someone living alone who was 65 years of age or older. The average household size was 2.6 and the average family size was 3.1. The percent of those with a bachelor's degree or higher was estimated to be 14.3% of the population.

21.5% of the population was under the age of 18, 5.0% from 18 to 24, 17.9% from 25 to 44, 25.2% from 45 to 64, and 30.4% who were 65 years of age or older. The median age was 51.5 years. For every 100 females, there were 108.0 males. For every 100 females ages 18 and older, there were 107.2 males.

The 2016–2020 5-year American Community Survey estimates show that the median household income was $54,063 (with a margin of error of +/- $16,127) and the median family income was $55,875 (+/- $16,677). Males had a median income of $31,034 (+/- $2,351) versus $23,646 (+/- $3,925) for females. The median income for those above 16 years old was $28,750 (+/- $3,668). Approximately, 0.0% of families and 4.6% of the population were below the poverty line, including 4.1% of those under the age of 18 and 4.5% of those ages 65 or over.

=== 2010 census ===
As of the census of 2010, there were 498 people, 218 households, and 143 families residing in the city. The population density was 1,509.1 inhabitants per square mile (582.7/km^{2}). There were 281 housing units at an average density of 851.5 per square mile (328.8/km^{2}). The racial makeup of the city was 98.4% White, 1.4% from other races, and 0.2% from two or more races. Hispanic or Latino of any race were 0.8% of the population.

There were 218 households, of which 22.0% had children under the age of 18 living with them, 50.0% were married couples living together, 10.1% had a female householder with no husband present, 5.5% had a male householder with no wife present, and 34.4% were non-families. 31.2% of all households were made up of individuals, and 14.7% had someone living alone who was 65 years of age or older. The average household size was 2.20 and the average family size was 2.70.

The median age in the city was 51.3 years. 19.7% of residents were under the age of 18; 5.1% were between the ages of 18 and 24; 17% were from 25 to 44; 28.6% were from 45 to 64; and 29.3% were 65 years of age or older. The gender makeup of the city was 48.2% male and 51.8% female.

== Education ==
The community is served by Southern Cloud USD 334 public school district.

== Notable people ==
- Elmer Stricklett, baseball player who pitched four seasons in the majors and many years afterwards in the minor leagues
