= Adelphi Cinema, Lichfield =

Cinema in Staffordshire, England

The Adelphi Cinema was a cinema in Lichfield, Staffordshire, England. Earlier names are the Lido Cinema and the Palladium Cinema. It was the David Garrick Memorial Theatre in the 1950s, and the site of the Theatre Royal in the 19th century.

== History ==
=== 1790 to World War II ===
A theatre, designed by John Miller of London, was built on the site on Bore Street (coordinates 52.6824°N 1.8283°W) in 1790. Companies usually played at the time of race meetings, for not more than a week. Isabella Mattocks, Edmund Kean and Dorothea Jordan were among the players seen in its early years. It was known as the Theatre Royal by 1859.

The theatre was replaced by St James's Hall, built in 1873, a venue for theatre performances, concerts and dances. From the early 1900s films were shown, and in 1912 it was converted into the Palladium Cinema. It was refurbished in 1937 and re-opened as the Lido Cinema, when the first film shown was Captain January.

The cinema was badly damaged by fire in 1942. To continue providing entertainment for American troops at Whittington Barracks, it was rebuilt, to the designs of Hurley Robinson, and re-opened in 1943.

=== David Garrick Theatre and Adelphi Cinema ===
The cinema closed in 1949, and after refurbishment was opened as the David Garrick Memorial Theatre (named for the actor David Garrick, who grew up in Lichfield). The theatre was managed by R. F. Cowlishaw and his wife Joan. The first play produced was Rebecca, and during the first year Kenneth Tynan produced The Beaux' Stratagem. The theatre closed after Joan Cowlishaw's death in 1953, and re-opened as the Adelphi Cinema. It finally closed in 1959.

The building was converted into a supermarket; it was demolished some time after 1991, and a branch of the hardware chain Wilkinsons was built on the site.
