= Theatre Royal, Gravesend =

Coordinates: 51.4425°N 0.3652°E

The Theatre Royal, Gravesend was a theatre established in the 1800s in Gravesend, Kent.

The theatre was established by the impresario Thomas Trotter as one of a number of provincial theatres in South East England. It opened in 1807.
