= Concordia, Kansas =

City in Cloud County, Kansas

- City and County seat
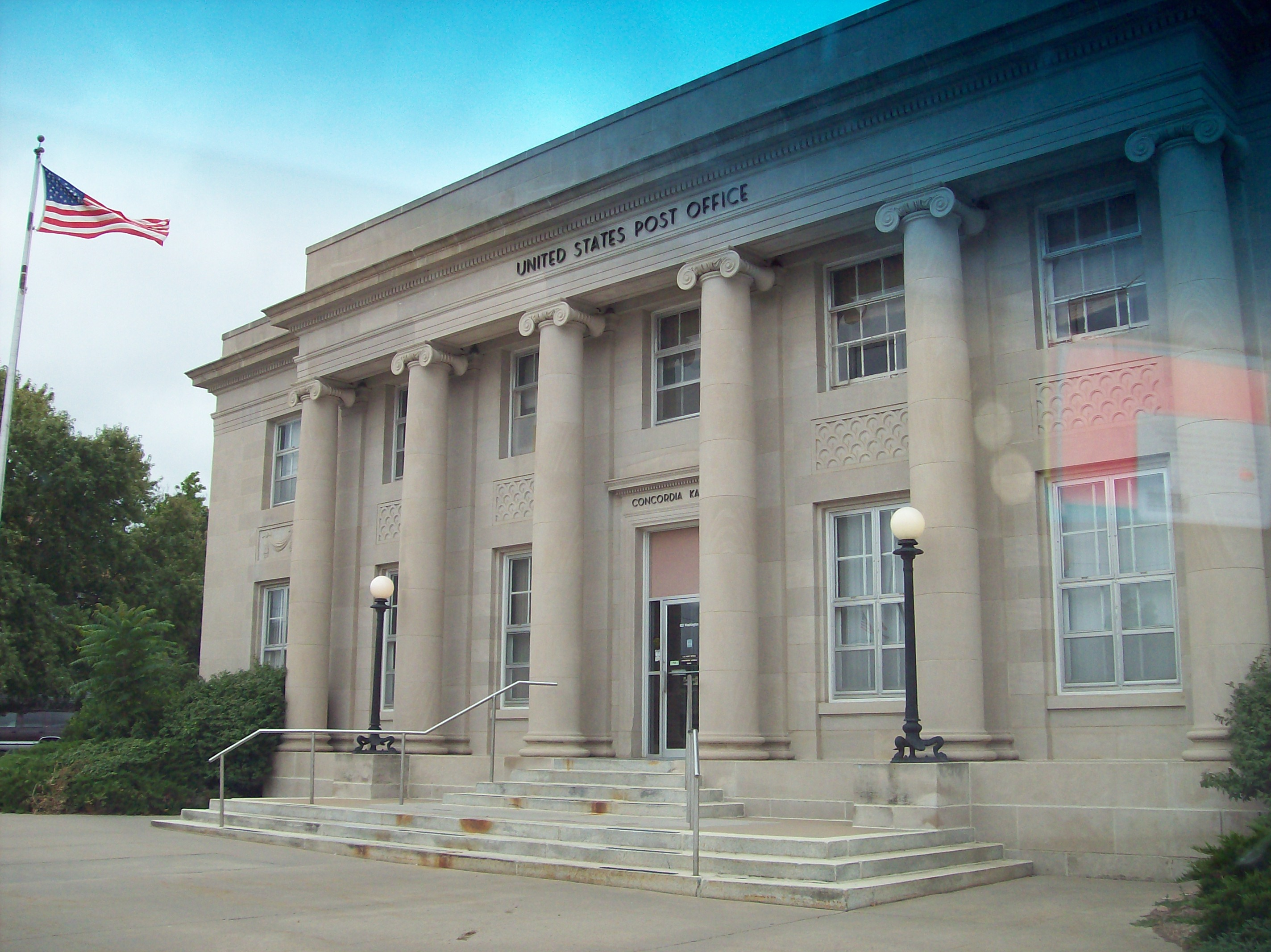
- Concordia Post Office (2007)

- Location within Cloud County and Kansas

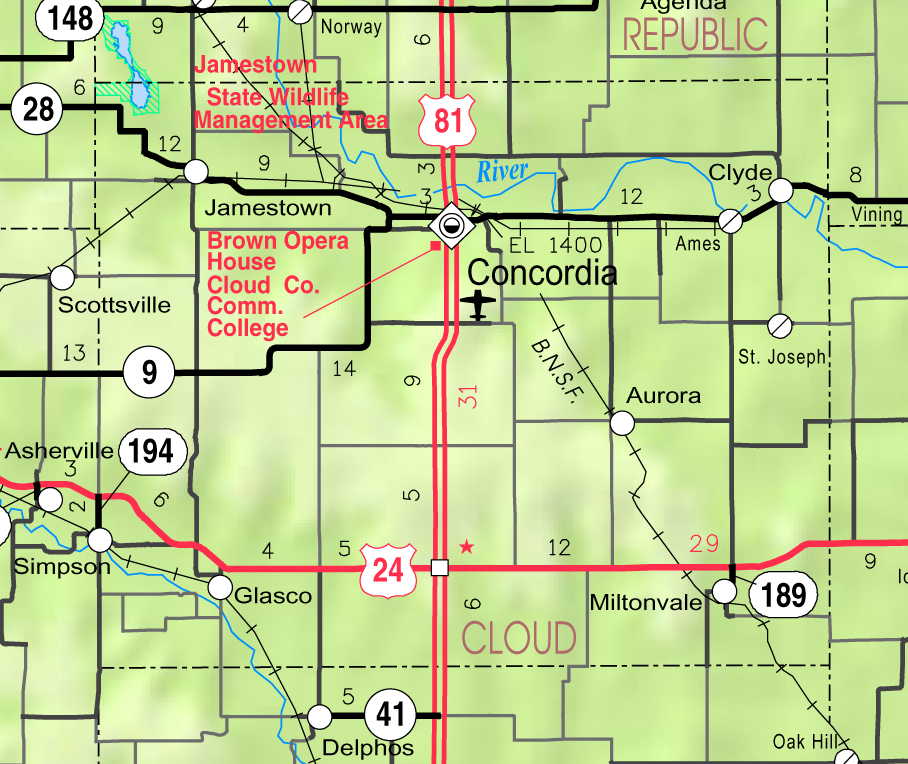
- KDOT map of Cloud County (legend)
- Coordinates: 39°34′10″N 97°38′30″W
- Country: United States
- State: Kansas
- County: Cloud
- Founded: 1870
- Platted: 1871
- Incorporated: 1872
- Named for: Concordia, Missouri

Government
  - Type: Commission-Manager
  - Mayor: Ashley Hutchinson
  - City Manager: Amy Lange

Area
  - Total: 4.50 sq mi (11.66 km^{2})
  - Land: 4.50 sq mi (11.66 km^{2})
  - Water: 0 sq mi (0.00 km^{2})
- Elevation: 1,385 ft (422 m)

Population (2020)
  - Total: 5,111
  - Density: 1,135/sq mi (438.3/km^{2})
- Time zone: UTC-6 (CST)
  - Summer (DST): UTC-5 (CDT)
- ZIP Code: 66901
- Area code: 785
- FIPS code: 20-15200
- GNIS ID: 485559
- Website: concordiaks.org

Concordia is a city in and the county seat of Cloud County, Kansas, United States. It is located along the Republican River in the Smoky Hills region of the Great Plains in North Central Kansas. As of the 2020 census, the population of the city was 5,111. Concordia is home of the Cloud County Community College and the Nazareth Convent and Academy.

== History ==
=== 19th century ===
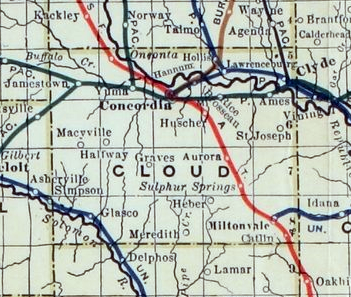
1915 railroad map of Cloud County

Concordia holds the distinction of being elected the county seat before the town was created. The founder of the town, James M. Hagaman, had created a complete layout of the town on paper including streets, blocks, courthouse, and parks. The name "Concordia" was chosen because a member of the early group of promoters ("Cap" Snyder) had once lived in Concordia, Missouri, and liked the name because it paid homage to the settlers-to-be's German heritage; the name "Concordia" is a German name found in many early Germanic poems.

December 1869 was the first election for the county seat with Concordia, Clyde, and the now defunct town, Sibley. Without a clear majority, a second election was held between Concordia and Sibley on January 4, 1870. Concordia was declared the winner over Sibley, 165 votes to 129.

It was over a year later when Concordia officially became a community when the Republican Land District Office opened on January 16, 1871. The Concordia Land Office continued until February 28, 1889, when it was consolidated with the land office in Topeka, Kansas.

Also in 1871, Concordia elected its first mayor, R. E. Allen. Under his leadership, Concordia was officially incorporated as a third class city under Kansas law in August 1872.

Concordia was visited in its early years by many traveling shows. As early as 1876, various traveling entertainers, including Wild Bill Hickok, Buffalo Bill Cody, Ringling Brothers, and others came to Concordia. In 1892, the Ringling train wrecked east of the town killing two men and 20 horses, but the show played the next day to a crowd of 4,000.

The first schoolteacher to teach inside the city limits was Milo Stevens, who was paid a salary of $20 per month. A state normal school was set up in Concordia in 1874 with F. E. Robinson as principal and former state Superintendent H. D. McCarty became president the second year. In 1876, the state ceased to provide funding and the school was closed.

In 1887, Atchison, Topeka and Santa Fe Railway built a branch line from Neva (three miles west of Strong City) through Concordia to Superior, Nebraska. In 1996, the Atchison, Topeka and Santa Fe Railway merged with Burlington Northern Railroad and renamed to the current BNSF Railway. Most locals still refer to this railroad as the "Santa Fe."

In 1897, Pope Leo XIII founded the Roman Catholic Diocese of Concordia, Kansas. The diocese was renamed in 1947 when the see was transferred to Salina, and it is now known as the Roman Catholic Diocese of Salina. It was later restored as a titular see in 1995.

=== 20th century ===
Carrie Nation visited Concordia in the early 1900s. Records are mixed, but the date is placed between 1908 and 1910. The Concordia Blade newspaper (now the Concordia Blade-Empire) reported:

"Carrie Nation is in town. That wonderfully brave little woman who started the crusade against Kansas saloons lectured at the M.E. Church this afternoon, and will talk again tonight at the courthouse. While in this city she is the guest of Mrs. George Mohr."

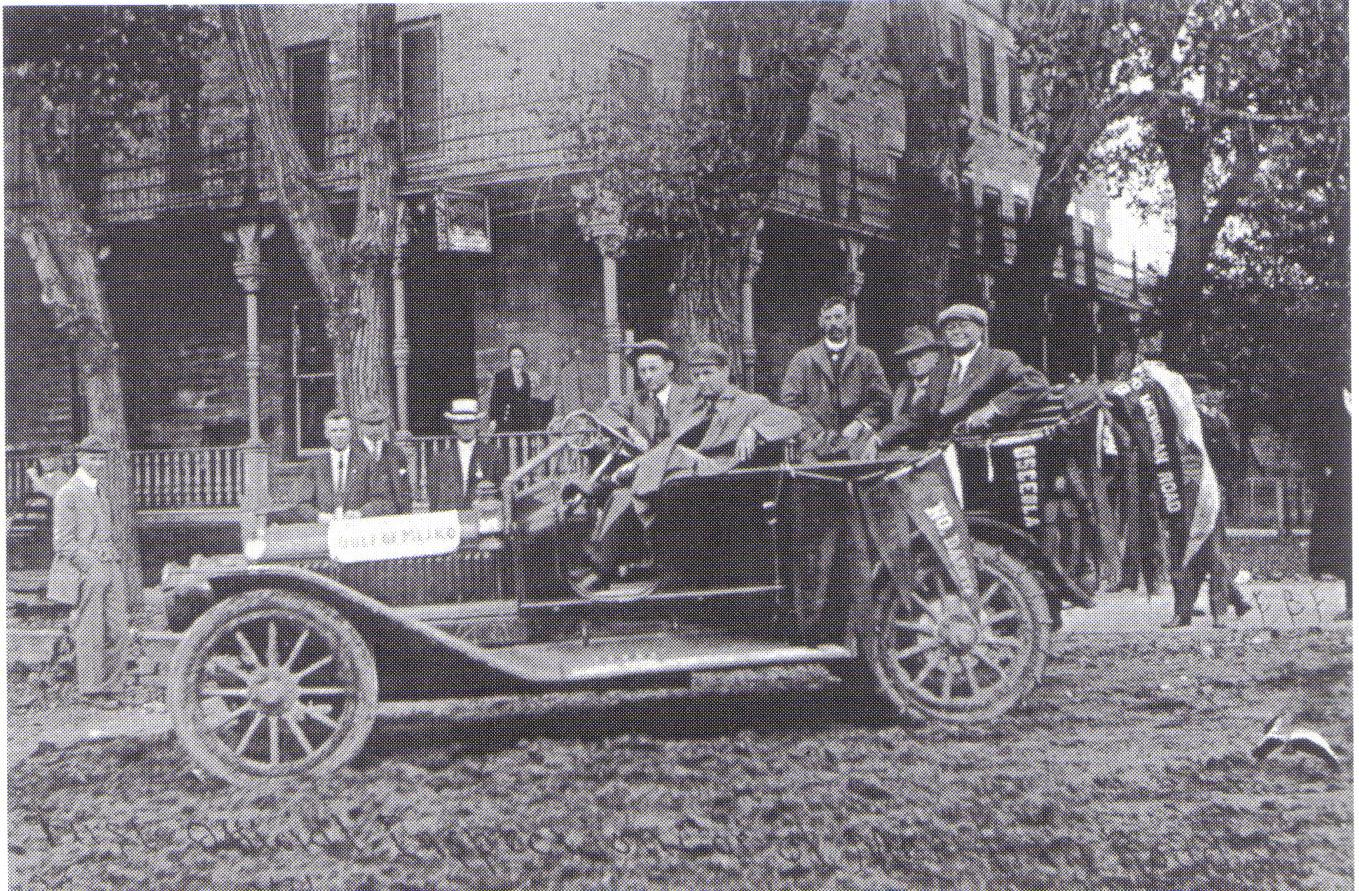
1912 Meridian Highway Inspection team

A major geographic change in the city and the area occurred on July 9, 1902. The Republican River flooded near town and broke a dam. The flooding resulted in re-routing the river by 1/4 of a mile.

The year of 1912 brought a major blizzard to Concordia with snow so deep that a Union Pacific train became stuck northeast of town and snowbanks on main street piled as high as peoples' heads. Also in 1912, the first official inspection team for Meridian Highway (now US-81) came through Concordia on their tour from Canada to Mexico. In 1913, the Missouri Pacific Railway depot was rebuilt after a fire destroyed the old building.

Another flood took place on June 20, 1915. Damage from the flood was significant but not as wide-sweeping as the flood of 1902.

From May 1, 1943, through November 8, 1945, Camp Concordia was a World War II internment camp for German prisoners of war.

== Geography ==
Concordia lies on the south side of the Republican River in the Smoky Hills region of the Great Plains. Lost Creek, a tributary of the Republican, flows north along the western edge of the city. Located in north-central Kansas at the intersection of U.S. Route 81 and K-9, Concordia is approximately 125 mi (201 km) north of Wichita, 149 mi (240 km) southwest of Omaha, and 169 mi (272 km) west-northwest of Kansas City.

According to the United States Census Bureau, the city has a total area of 4.32 square miles (11.19 km^{2}), all land.

=== Climate ===
Concordia has a humid continental climate (Köppen Dfa), with hot, humid summers and cold, dry winters; it is part of USDA Hardiness zone 6a. The normal monthly mean temperature ranges from 28.6 °F (−1.9 °C) in January to 79.1 °F (26.2 °C) in July. On average, there are 7.1 days that reach 100 °F (38 °C) or higher, 50.2 days that reach 90 °F (32 °C) or higher, 28.4 days that do not climb above freezing, and 4.1 days with a low of 0 °F (−18 °C) or below. Extreme temperatures officially range from −33 °F (−36 °C) on January 8, 1886, up to 116 °F (47 °C) on August 12, 1936; the record cold daily maximum is −11 °F (−24 °C) on January 14, 1888, while, conversely, the record warm daily minimum is 86 °F (30 °C) on July 1, 1933.

Precipitation is greatest in May and has ranged from 12.83 in (326 mm) in 1956 to 44.79 in (1,138 mm) in 1993. Snowfall averages 19.3 in (49 cm) per season, and has historically ranged from 2.5 in (6.4 cm) in 1903–04 to 59.1 in (150 cm) in 1959–60.

Climate data for Concordia, Kansas (Blosser Municipal Airport), 1991–2020 normals, extremes 1885–present
Month	Jan	Feb	Mar	Apr	May	Jun	Jul	Aug	Sep	Oct	Nov	Dec	Year
Record high °F (°C)	78 (26)	86 (30)	97 (36)	100 (38)	102 (39)	109 (43)	114 (46)	116 (47)	112 (44)	102 (39)	85 (29)	82 (28)	116 (47)
Mean maximum °F (°C)	62.1 (16.7)	68.1 (20.1)	78.8 (26.0)	85.5 (29.7)	91.8 (33.2)	98.0 (36.7)	101.8 (38.8)	100.2 (37.9)	95.7 (35.4)	87.9 (31.1)	74.1 (23.4)	62.8 (17.1)	103.3 (39.6)
Mean daily maximum °F (°C)	38.7 (3.7)	43.5 (6.4)	55.4 (13.0)	64.9 (18.3)	74.8 (23.8)	86.0 (30.0)	90.3 (32.4)	87.7 (30.9)	80.4 (26.9)	67.5 (19.7)	53.0 (11.7)	41.1 (5.1)	65.3 (18.5)
Daily mean °F (°C)	28.8 (−1.8)	32.8 (0.4)	43.5 (6.4)	53.1 (11.7)	63.5 (17.5)	74.4 (23.6)	78.9 (26.1)	76.4 (24.7)	68.5 (20.3)	55.6 (13.1)	42.1 (5.6)	31.5 (−0.3)	54.1 (12.3)
Mean daily minimum °F (°C)	18.9 (−7.3)	22.1 (−5.5)	31.7 (−0.2)	41.2 (5.1)	52.2 (11.2)	62.8 (17.1)	67.4 (19.7)	65.1 (18.4)	56.5 (13.6)	43.7 (6.5)	31.3 (−0.4)	21.9 (−5.6)	42.9 (6.1)
Mean minimum °F (°C)	−1.0 (−18.3)	2.9 (−16.2)	11.9 (−11.2)	25.3 (−3.7)	37.4 (3.0)	50.8 (10.4)	56.4 (13.6)	53.9 (12.2)	40.5 (4.7)	25.9 (−3.4)	14.3 (−9.8)	3.8 (−15.7)	−4.9 (−20.5)
Record low °F (°C)	−33 (−36)	−25 (−32)	−11 (−24)	12 (−11)	24 (−4)	41 (5)	46 (8)	41 (5)	29 (−2)	14 (−10)	−15 (−26)	−26 (−32)	−33 (−36)
Average precipitation inches (mm)	0.67 (17)	0.86 (22)	1.53 (39)	2.53 (64)	4.34 (110)	3.83 (97)	4.15 (105)	3.49 (89)	2.80 (71)	1.98 (50)	1.16 (29)	1.04 (26)	28.38 (719)
Average snowfall inches (cm)	5.4 (14)	5.2 (13)	1.6 (4.1)	0.4 (1.0)	0.0 (0.0)	0.0 (0.0)	0.0 (0.0)	0.0 (0.0)	0.0 (0.0)	0.3 (0.76)	1.9 (4.8)	4.5 (11)	19.3 (48.66)
Average precipitation days (≥ 0.01 in)	4.8	5.2	7.2	8.7	11.9	10.1	9.3	9.0	7.0	6.6	5.1	5.0	89.9
Average snowy days (≥ 0.1 in)	3.0	3.2	1.4	0.4	0.0	0.0	0.0	0.0	0.0	0.3	1.3	2.7	12.3
Source 1: NOAA
Source 2: National Weather Service

== Demographics ==
Historical population
Census	Pop.	Note	%±
1880	1,853		—
1890	3,184		71.8%
1900	3,401		6.8%
1910	4,415		29.8%
1920	4,705		6.6%
1930	5,792		23.1%
1940	6,255		8.0%
1950	7,175		14.7%
1960	7,022		−2.1%
1970	7,221		2.8%
1980	6,847		−5.2%
1990	6,167		−9.9%
2000	5,714		−7.3%
2010	5,395		−5.6%
2020	5,111		−5.3%
2023 (est.)	5,004		−2.1%
U.S. Decennial Census; 2010-2020

According to the census (2006 estimate), Concordia is the most populous city in the county and of all six adjacent counties.

=== 2020 census ===
As of the 2020 census, Concordia had a population of 5,111, with 2,023 households and 1,169 families. The population density was 1,134.8 inhabitants per square mile (438.1/km^{2}), and there were 2,512 housing units at an average density of 557.7 per square mile (215.3/km^{2}).

The median age was 37.5 years. 21.6% of residents were under the age of 18, 13.3% were from 18 to 24, 22.6% were from 25 to 44, 21.9% were from 45 to 64, and 20.5% were 65 years of age or older. For every 100 females there were 101.2 males, and for every 100 females age 18 and over there were 97.8 males age 18 and over.

98.4% of residents lived in urban areas, while 1.6% lived in rural areas.

There were 2,023 households in Concordia, of which 26.9% had children under the age of 18 living in them. Of all households, 42.4% were married-couple households, 21.9% were households with a male householder and no spouse or partner present, and 27.6% were households with a female householder and no spouse or partner present. About 35.5% of all households were made up of individuals and 16.1% had someone living alone who was 65 years of age or older.

There were 2,512 housing units, of which 19.5% were vacant. The homeowner vacancy rate was 6.5% and the rental vacancy rate was 17.5%.

Racial composition as of the 2020 census
Race	Number	Percent
White	4,578	89.6%
Black or African American	113	2.2%
American Indian and Alaska Native	29	0.6%
Asian	32	0.6%
Native Hawaiian and Other Pacific Islander	8	0.2%
Some other race	75	1.5%
Two or more races	276	5.4%
Hispanic or Latino (of any race)	297	5.8%

White alone, not Hispanic or Latino, made up 87.63% of the population.

Demographic estimates

The average household size was 2.2 and the average family size was 2.7.

The percent of those with a bachelor's degree or higher was estimated to be 16.8% of the population.

Income and poverty

The 2016–2020 5-year American Community Survey estimates show that the median household income was $44,185 (with a margin of error of +/- $2,603) and the median family income was $48,333 (+/- $12,035). Males had a median income of $28,219 (+/- $5,160) versus $21,441 (+/- $4,464) for females. The median income for those above 16 years old was $26,147 (+/- $4,160). Approximately, 6.9% of families and 13.6% of the population were below the poverty line, including 13.1% of those under the age of 18 and 4.9% of those ages 65 or over.

=== 2010 census ===
As of the census of 2010, there were 5,395 people, 2,186 households, and 1,301 families residing in the city. The population density was 1,248.8 inhabitants per square mile (482.2/km^{2}). There were 2,545 housing units at an average density of 589.1 per square mile (227.5/km^{2}). The racial makeup of the city was 95.3% White, 0.8% African American, 0.4% Native American, 0.2% Asian, 1.4% from other races, and 1.9% from two or more races. Hispanic or Latino of any race were 4.3% of the population.

There were 2,186 households, of which 28.1% had children under the age of 18 living with them, 45.6% were married couples living together, 9.6% had a female householder with no husband present, 4.3% had a male householder with no wife present, and 40.5% were non-families. 34.2% of all households were made up of individuals, and 15.9% had someone living alone who was 65 years of age or older. The average household size was 2.26 and the average family size was 2.86.

The median age in the city was 38.7 years. 22.3% of residents were under the age of 18; 14.2% were between the ages of 18 and 24; 20.2% were from 25 to 44; 23.3% were from 45 to 64; and 20.1% were 65 years of age or older. The gender makeup of the city was 47.7% male and 52.3% female.

== Government ==
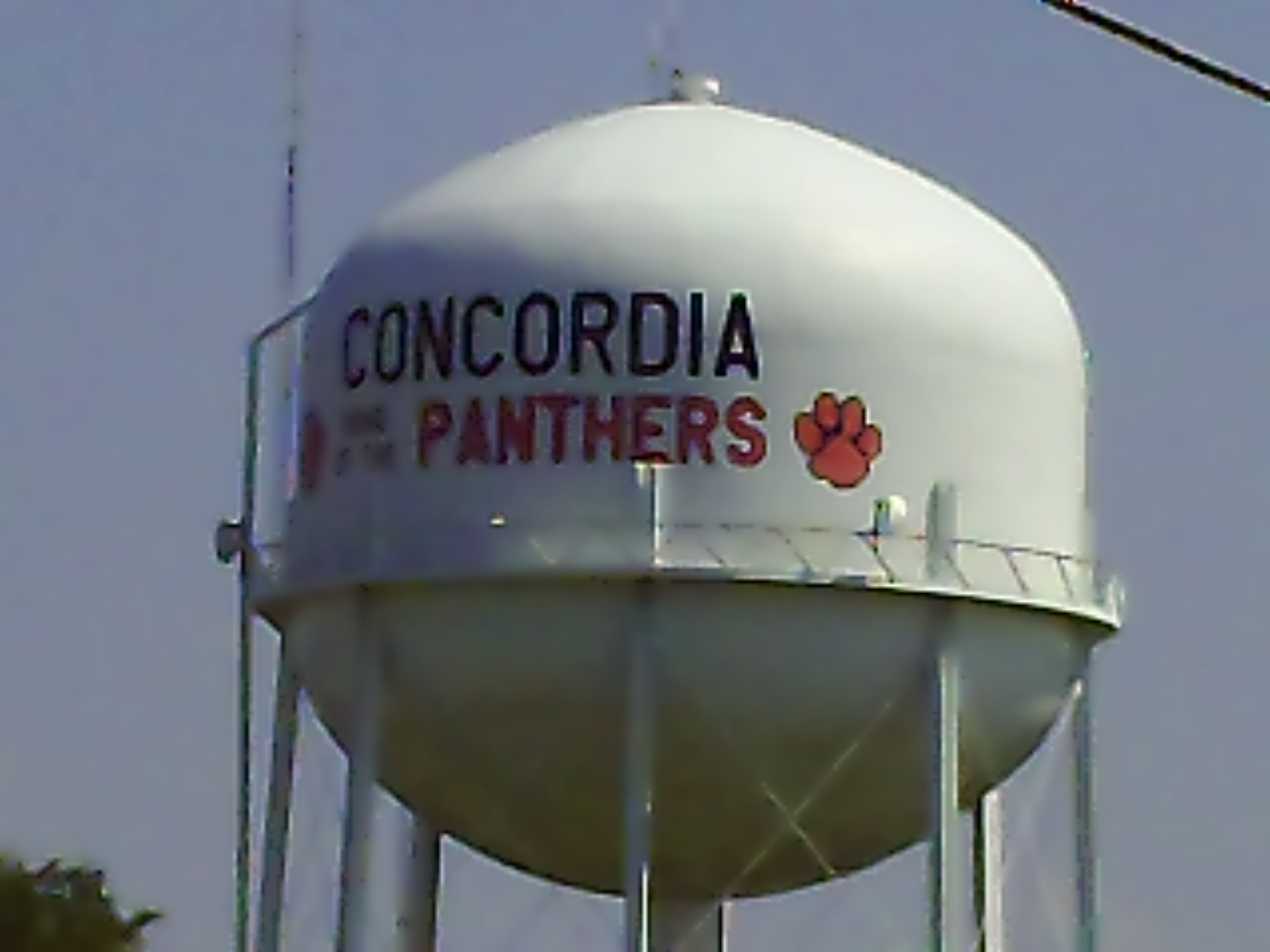
One of two water towers in Concordia.

=== City government ===
The Concordia city government consists of five commissioners, of which one is elected mayor each year by the other four members. The commission meets the 1st and 3rd Wednesday of each month at 5:30PM. Other government facilities include city services such as water, sewer, police, and fire departments.

=== Other government services ===
Concordia holds other government services in its city limits. The town is home to various county services such as the county sheriff and county court house as well as state government buildings including an armory for the Kansas National Guard. There also are federal offices and buildings common to small communities such as the United States Post Office.

== Education ==
Former Concordia Carnegie Library, now is Cloud County Museum (2007)

=== Colleges and universities ===
Concordia is the location of Cloud County Community College, a two-year junior college. Other post-secondary schools in Concordia's history are Concordia Normal School and Concordia Business College.

=== Primary and secondary education ===
The community is served by Concordia USD 333 public school district. Education for grades K-6 are completed in the district across several buildings. Public secondary education for grades 7-12 is completed at Concordia Junior-Senior High School. Class sizes typically range between 80 and 120 students. The school district also runs the Cloud County Alternative High School, primarily for area non-traditional students. Students can earn their diploma online or through computer-based classes. Enrollment is very small, typically graduating less than ten students each year.

The Catholic Church in Concordia operated Notre Dame High School, a private Catholic high school, from 1962 to 1969. It remained open as a Catholic grade school until 1971, when the local district purchased the property and has since used it for fifth and sixth grades under the name Concordia Middle School.

=== Libraries ===
Concordia is home to the Frank Carlson Library, a public library named for former Kansas governor Frank Carlson. Other public libraries in Concordia's history include the Carnegie Library, built with a $10,000 donation from Andrew Carnegie in 1908.

== Transportation ==
Concordia is the host of Blosser Municipal Airport (CNK). Blosser Municipal Airport is publicly owned by the City of Concordia. The National Weather Service and the Kansas National Guard maintain facilities at this location.

== Media ==
The Concordia Blade-Empire is the official county newspaper and publishes its edition five days a week from its location in Concordia.

Radio stations KNCK (1390 AM) and KNCK-FM (94.9 FM) operate from the same broadcasting facility in Concordia and are privately owned. Radio station KVCO (88.3 FM) operates as a broadcast journalism project by Cloud County Community College in Concordia. KVCO is publicly owned and operated by the school.

== Culture ==
=== Points of interest ===
The Brown Grand Theatre, 1907

In November 1905, Concordia resident Colonel Napoleon Bonaparte Brown announced to the townspeople his plans to build the Brown Grand Theatre, a fully outfitted opera house for Concordia. Renowned Kansas City theater architect Carl Boller was hired to prepare the design drawings and the blueprints. Restored to its original 1907 state, the 650 seat Brown Grand Theatre now serves as a tourist attraction and performing arts/community center for Concordia and North Central Kansas.

Camp Concordia, a prisoner of war camp for captured Germans, was maintained a few miles north of Concordia during World War II. The original guard house remains and has been restored.

The Cloud County Historical Museum preserves and exhibits objects and documents of historical items representing early-day Kansas. It is housed in the former 1908 Andrew Carnegie Library building and a large newer annex. Cloud County, Kansas artifacts exhibited for viewing include items relating to nature, radio, railroads, quilts, photography, toys, vintage clothing and furniture, musical instruments, fossils, tools, and stained glass. The museum is also home of one of the largest hand carved brick murals. Records are on display of the military Prisoner of War Camp, churches, organizations, schools, and businesses. Displays of glass cutting, rare coins and books, rock and gem shop, micro-film of county newspapers and many others too numerous to list. Large displays in the annex include the 1908 Lincoln-Page Airplane, an 1898 Holsman belt driven horseless carriage, and a 1915 Ford Model T.

The Cloud County Veterans Memorial is housed in the courthouse block of Concordia. The memorial includes an "eternal flame" that has been burning since the monument was established on November 11, 1968.

Concordia is the home of the national Orphan Train complex, housed in the restored historic Union Pacific Railroad Depot. The complex currently houses a museum and research center dedicated to the preservation of the stories and artifacts of those who were part of the Orphan Train Movement from 1854 to 1929.

The Nazareth Convent and Academy is the official Motherhouse and Home for the 260 Sisters of St. Joseph of Concordia. It was built in 1903 and is listed in the National Register of Historic Places. The sisters at Nazareth earned a reputation for their education of young women, giving them a sound academic program and instruction in the fine arts, music, French, and the social graces. In 1903, the Sisters of St. Joseph entered the health care field in Concordia with the establishment of the St. Joseph Hospital on the original site after the new Nazareth Motherhouse was built at its present location.

The most common historic bridge visited is the Republican River Pegram Truss, a three-span through truss bridge built in 1893 for the Union Pacific Railway. As of 2007, the bridge is used for local automobile traffic. Other bridges in the area are the County Line Bowstring bridge near Hollis and the Pott's Ford Bridge near Glasco. All three bridges are listed on the National Register of Historic Places.

Concordia claims the title "The Stained Glass Capital of Kansas" and a tour of local stained glass pieces has been established. Although common in houses of worship, many private residences also have quality stained glass installed and available for viewing on the tour.

=== Parks and recreation ===
Small game hunting (particularly game birds such as pheasant, quail, and dove) attracts a large number of people from all over the world. Opening Day of hunting season is an especially active day for Concordia as it brings a large number of visitors and a boost to the local economy.

The city of Concordia has complementary overnight camping available at Airport Park, one of several city parks. Airport Park is located at the Blosser Municipal Airport.

== Notable people ==
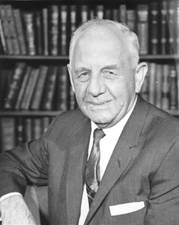
Former Kansas Governor Frank Carlson was a longtime resident of Concordia.

=== Academic ===
- George Norlin, former president of the University of Colorado
- Sam E. Roberts, otolaryngologist, medical academic and author

=== Arts/Entertainment ===
- Jim Garver, guitarist for Garth Brooks
- Robert E. Pearson, movie director
- Marilyn Schreffler, American actress who provided voice-overs for several animated TV programs
- Helen Talbot, motion picture actress and pin-up girl
- The Sensational Showmen, rock show band from 1964 to 1968, inducted into Kansas Music Hall of Fame in 2009

=== Business/Politics ===
- Charles H. Blosser, local businessman and namesake of Blosser Municipal Airport in Concordia
- Napoleon Bonaparte Brown, local businessman and philanthropist, namesake of the Brown Grand Theatre in Concordia
- Frank Carlson, former congressman, Senator, and Governor of Kansas
- Deanell Reece Tacha, chief judge of the U.S. Court of Appeals for the Tenth Circuit
- Clyde Short, former chairman of the Kansas Democratic Party

=== Religion ===
- Charles J. Chaput, archbishop of the Roman Catholic Archdiocese of Philadelphia, Pennsylvania
- John Francis Cunningham, Bishop of Concordia
- Jim Garlow, pastor of Skyline Church in La Mesa, California
- Constantine Scollen, famous missionary priest was resident from 1896 until 1898

=== Sports ===
- Tom Brosius, track and field athlete
- Greg Brummett, former MLB baseball player (San Francisco Giants, Minnesota Twins); head baseball coach at Cloud County Community College
- Keith Christensen, former NFL football player (New Orleans Saints)
- Billy Dewell, former NFL football player (Chicago Cardinals)
- Bill Dotson, track and field athlete
- Mike Gardner, head football coach at Tabor College and Malone University
- Larry Hartshorn, former NFL football player (Chicago Cardinals)
- Tim McCarty, head football coach at East Central University
- Ernie Quigley, professional basketball referee and umpire in Major League Baseball; member of the Basketball Hall of Fame
- Harry Short, Texas League baseball player
- Shanele Stires, former WNBA basketball player (Minnesota Lynx) and college basketball coach
- Kaye Vaughan, former Canadian Football League and Hall of Fame player with Ottawa Rough Riders; winner of the CFL's Outstanding Lineman Award

=== Other ===
- Boston Corbett, Union American Civil War soldier, famous for shooting John Wilkes Booth, the man who assassinated Abraham Lincoln
- Pop Hollinger, one of the first comic book collectors of all time

== Popular culture ==
The song "Friends in Low Places," made famous by Garth Brooks, mentions a bar called "The Oasis" that is named after a now-closed establishment in Concordia.

== Image gallery ==
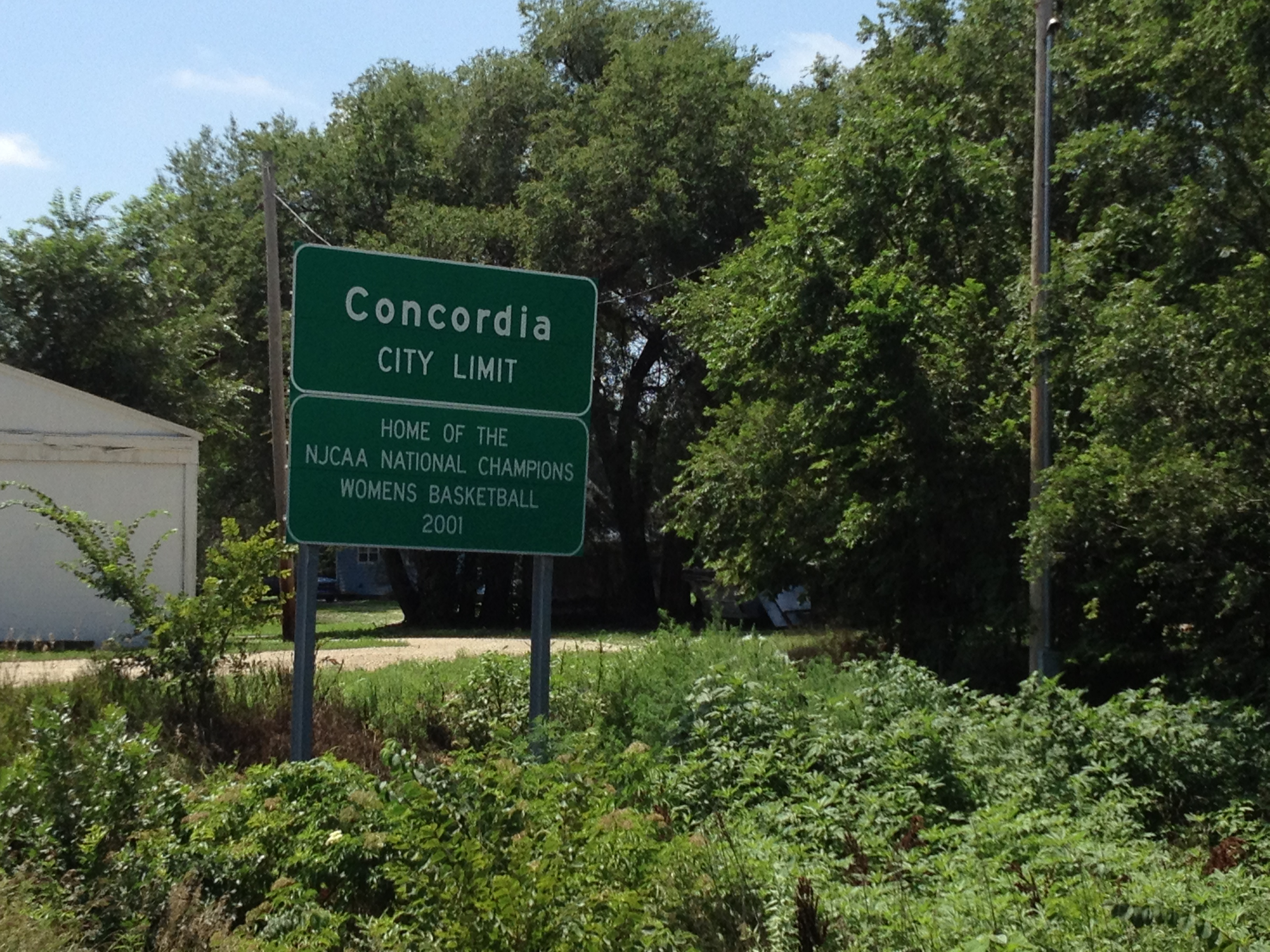
City limits, north side of town

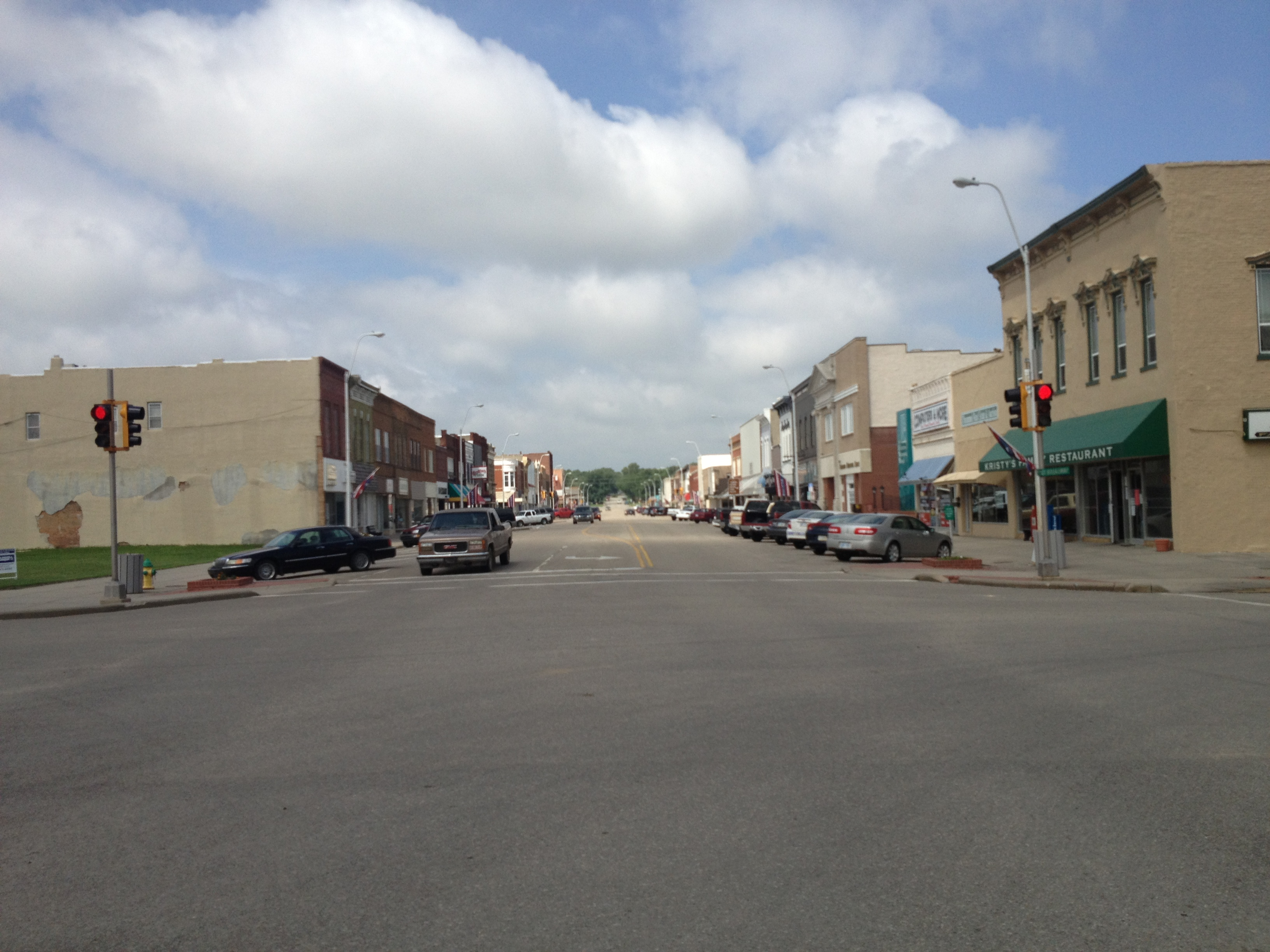
Main Street (looking west)

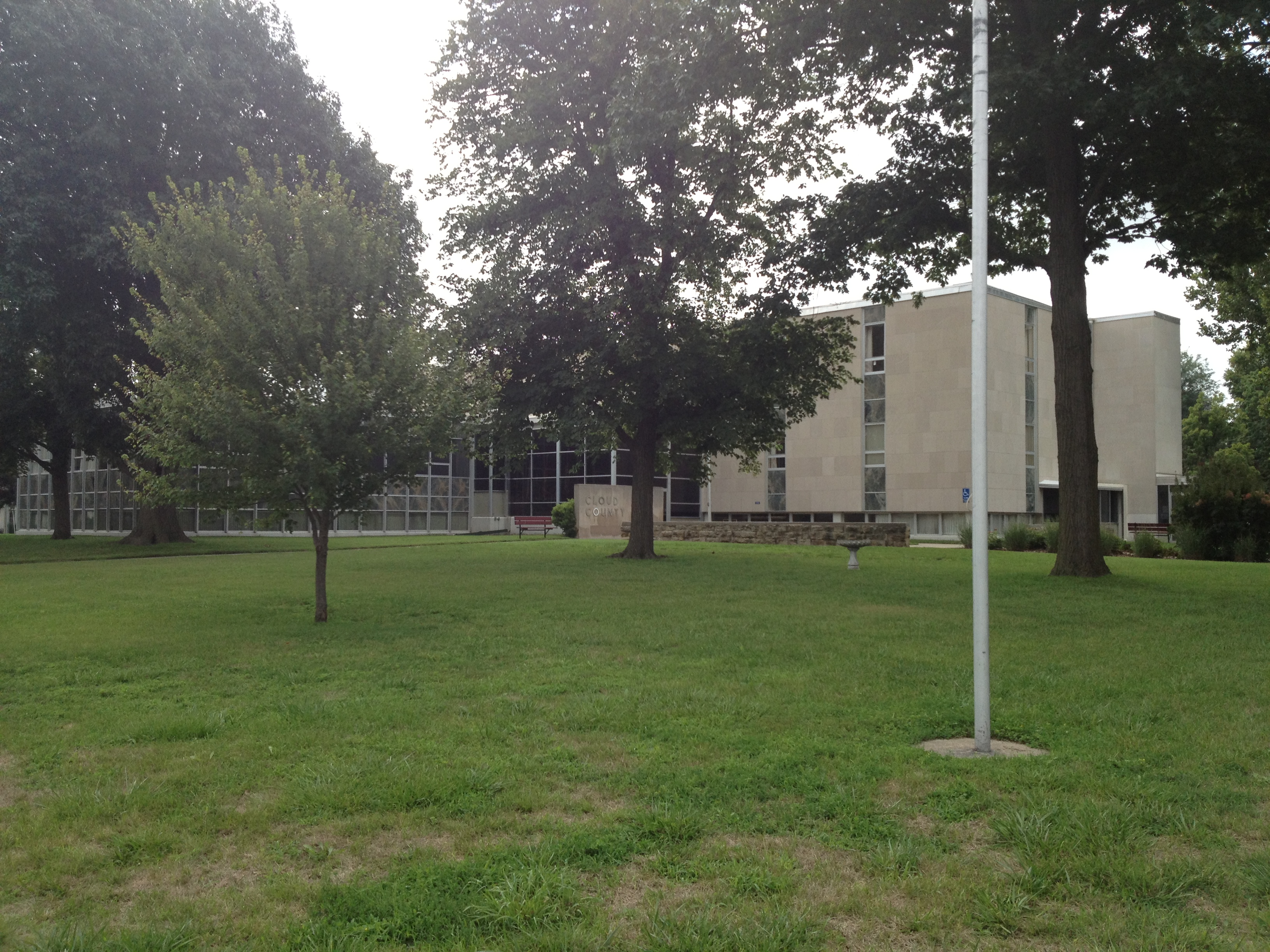
Cloud County Court House

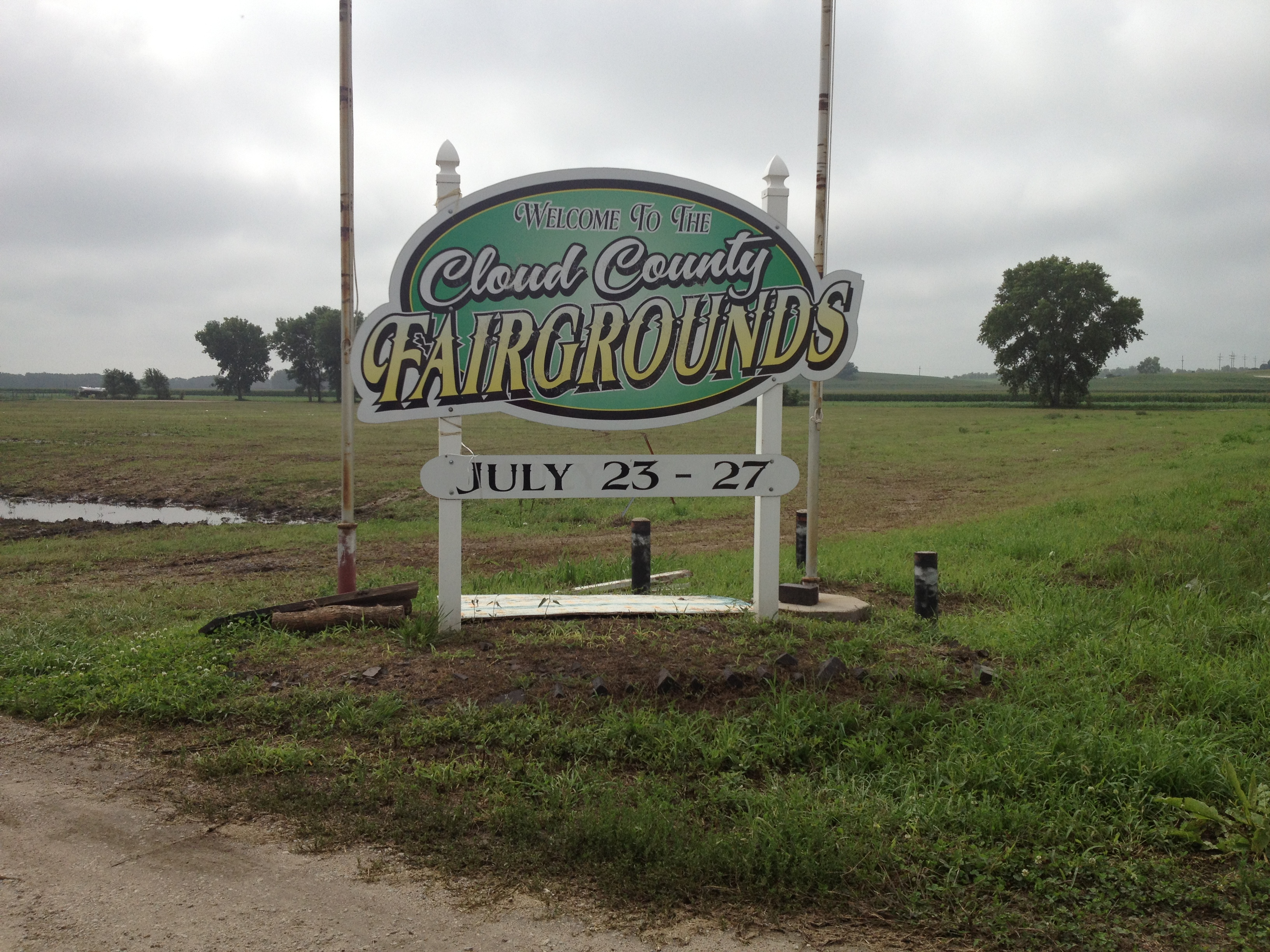
Welcome sign for the Cloud County Fairgrounds

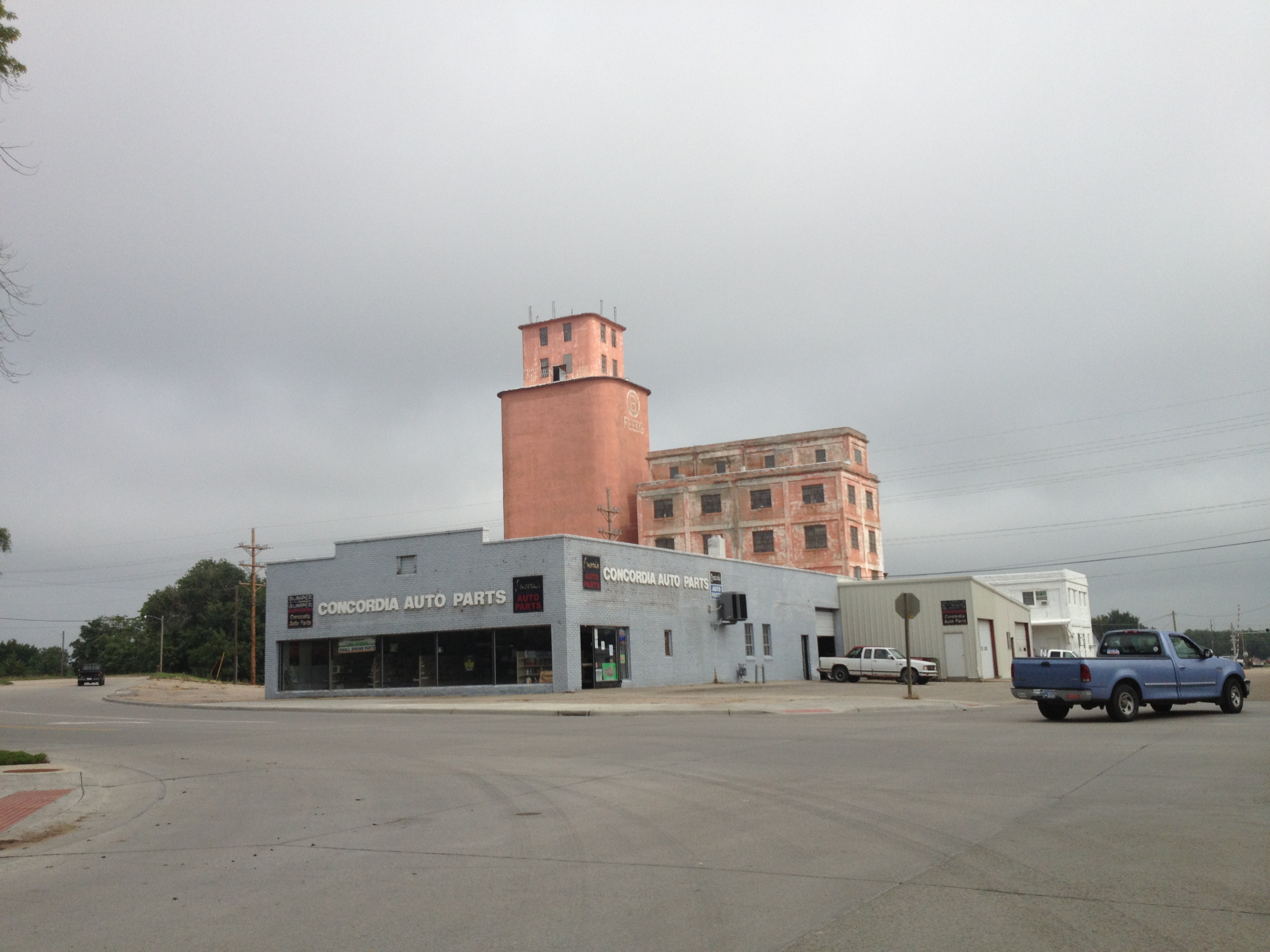
Circle B Grain Elevator

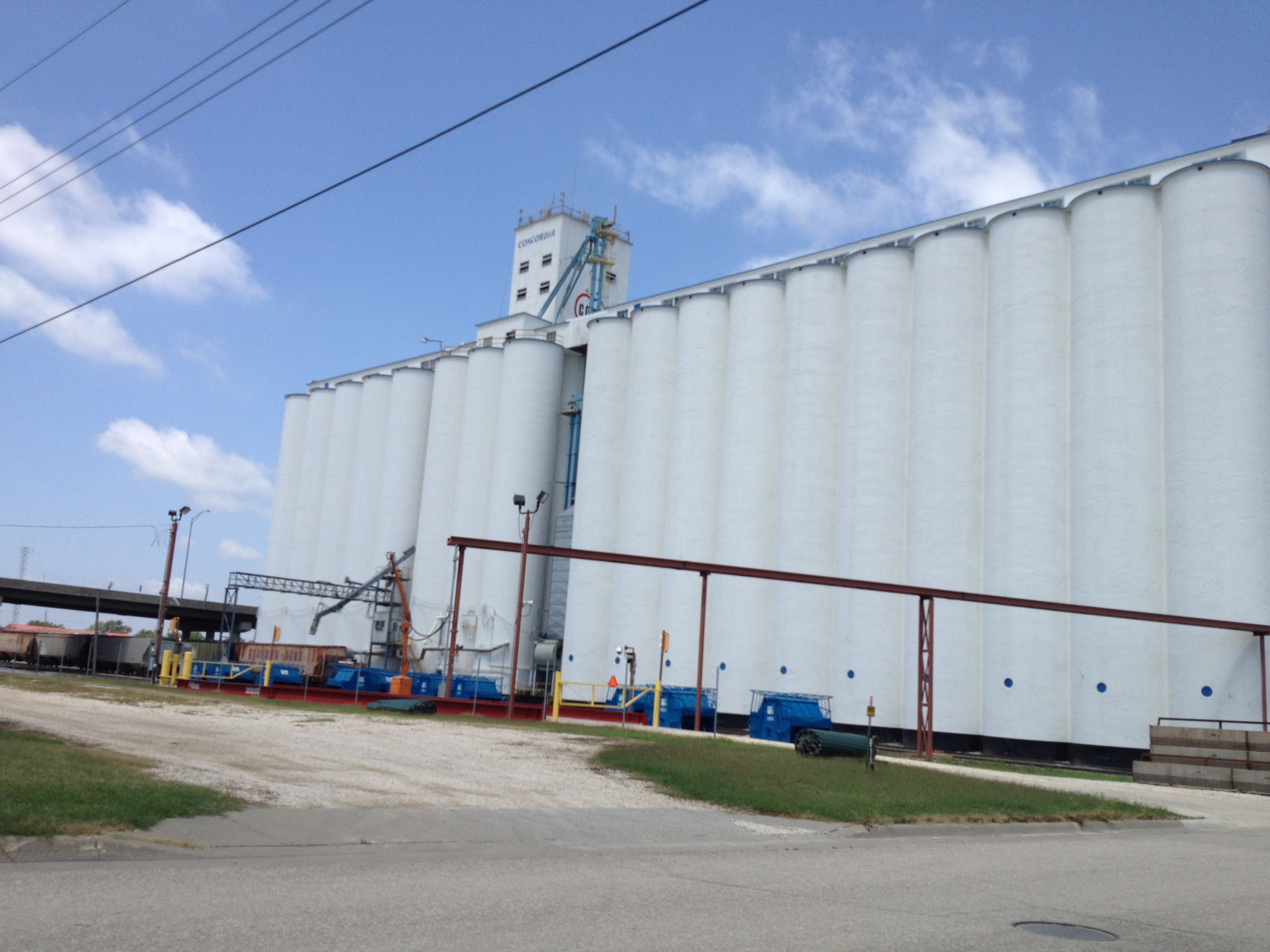
CO-OP grain elevator

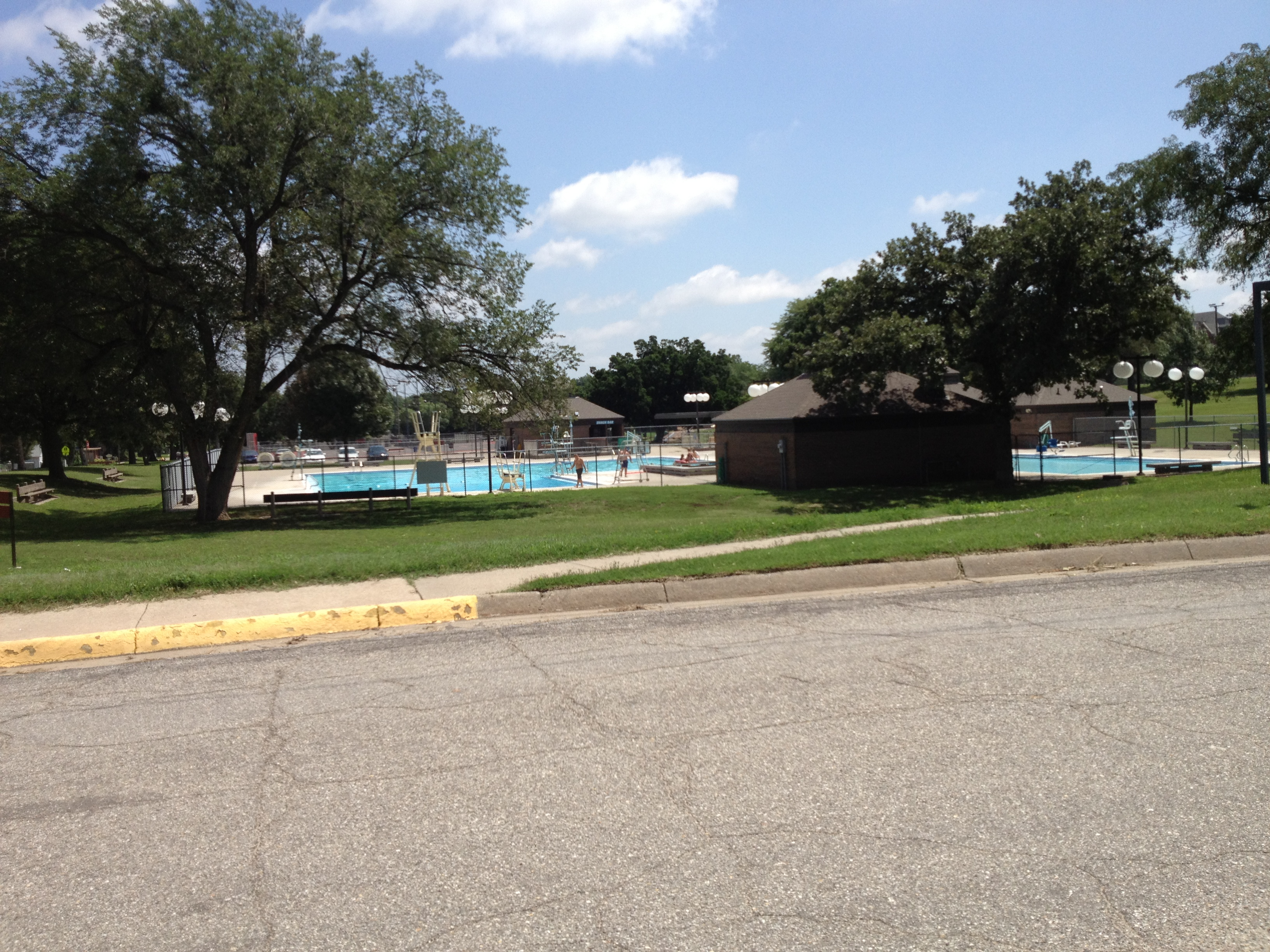
City Park

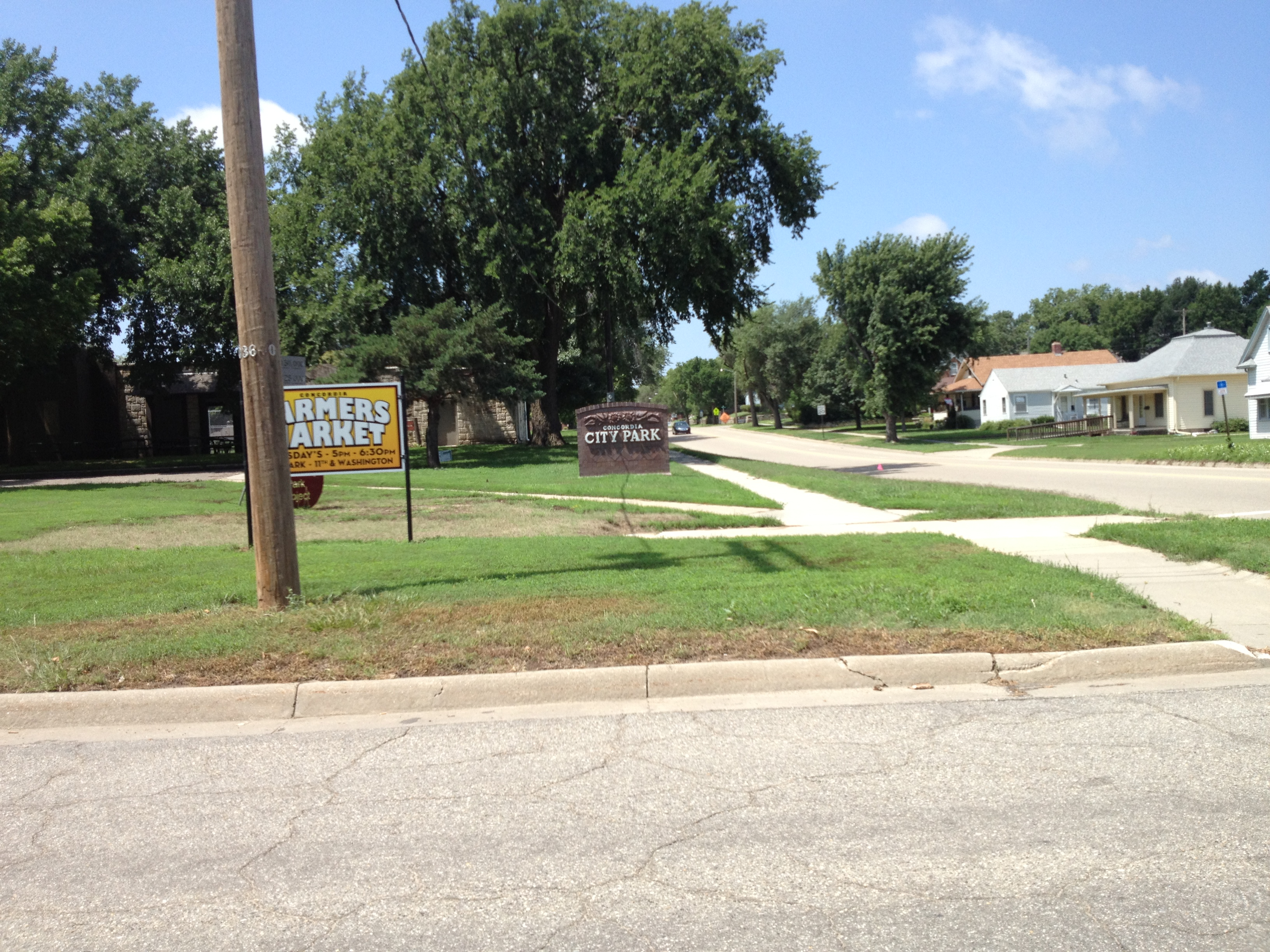
Farmer's Market

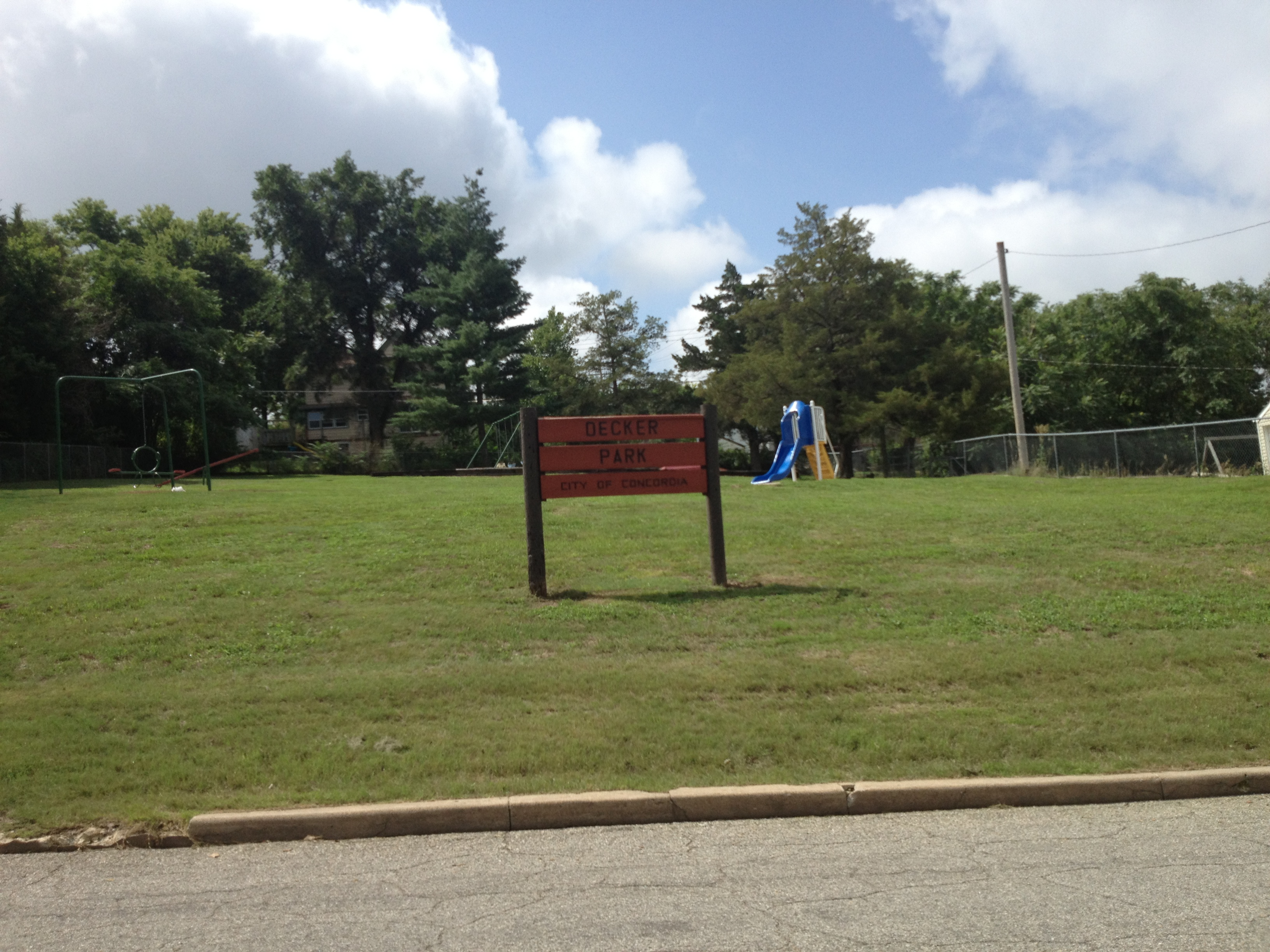
Decker Park

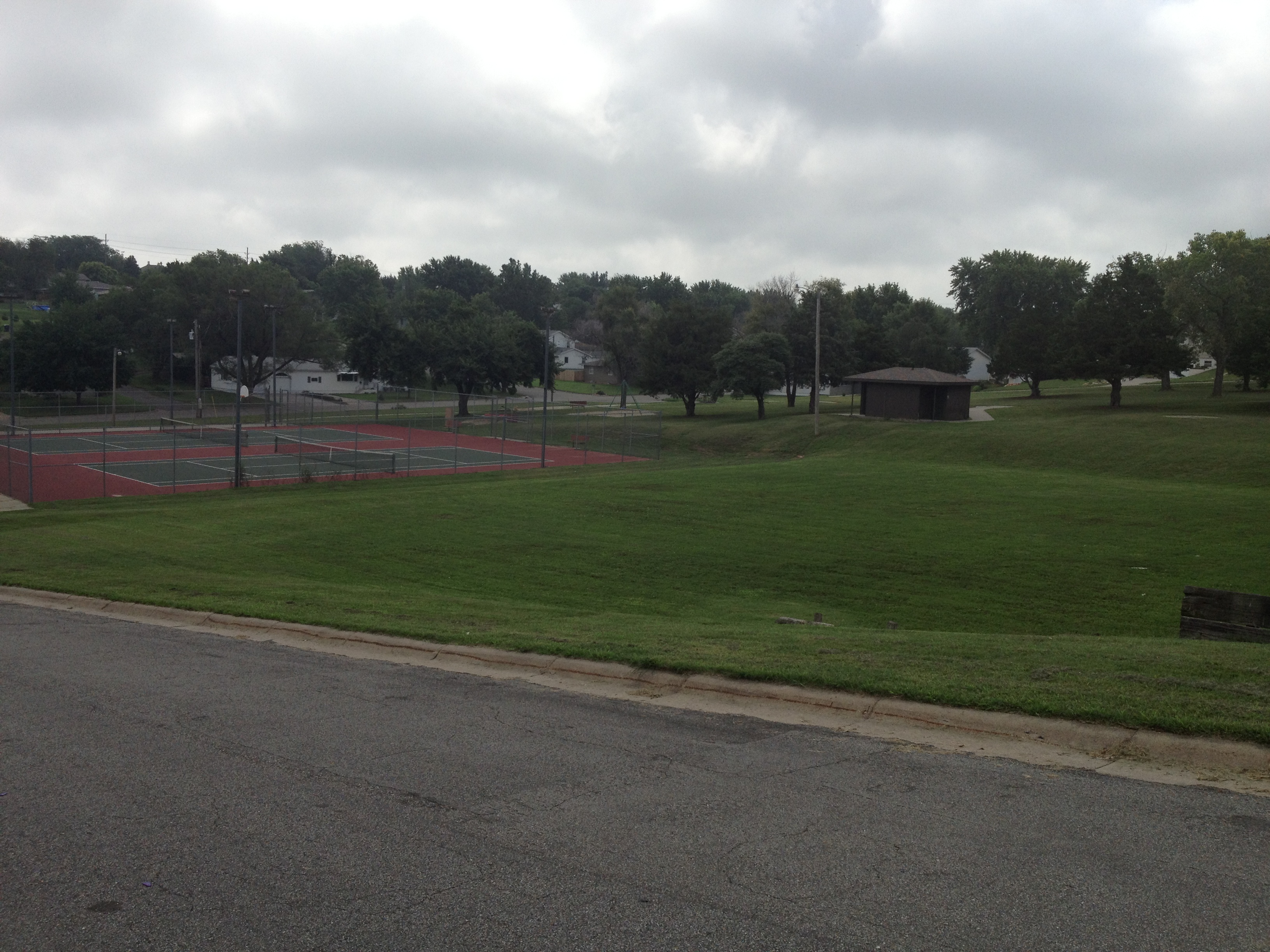
Hood Park

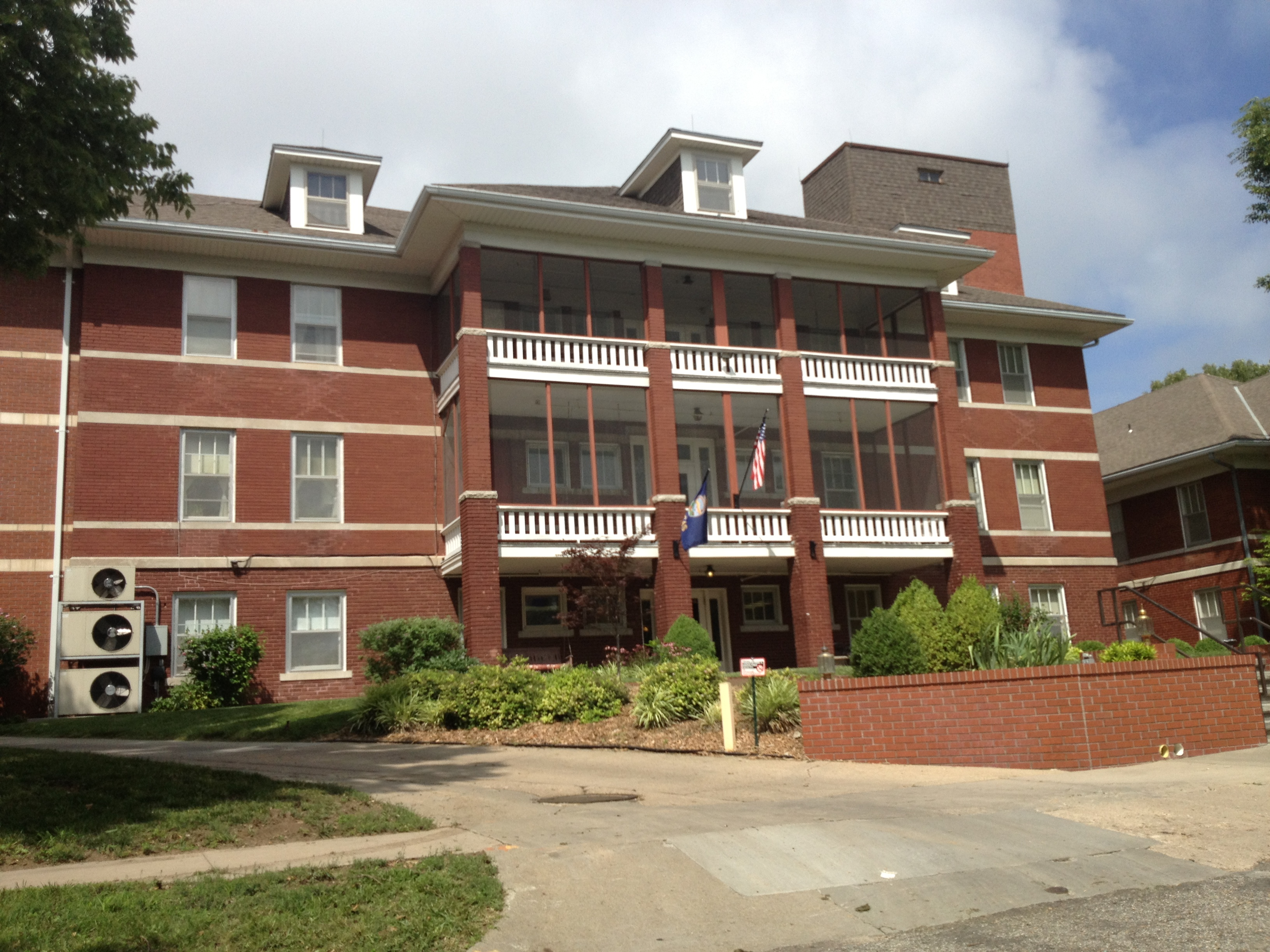
Sunset Home

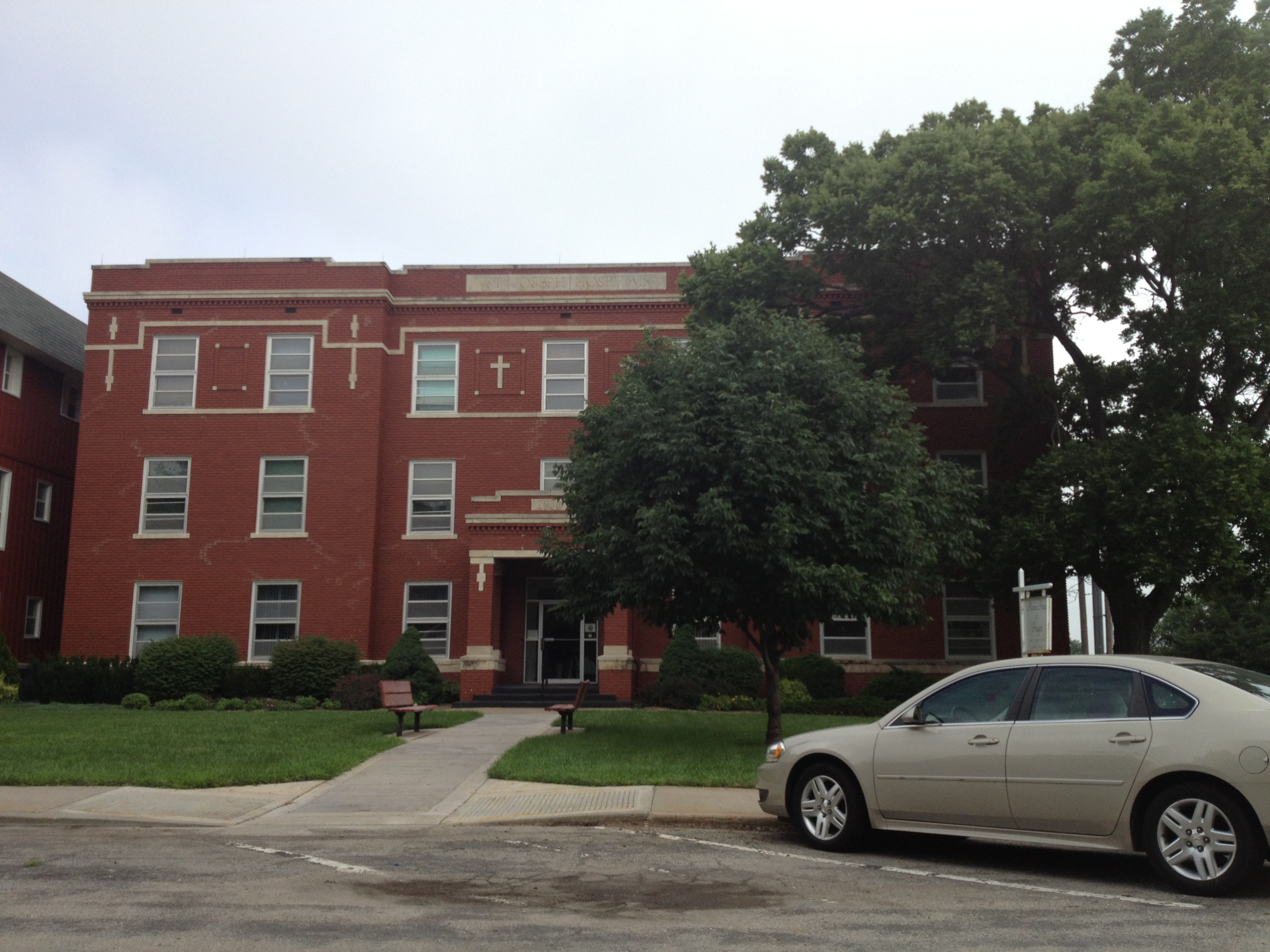
Manna House of Prayer

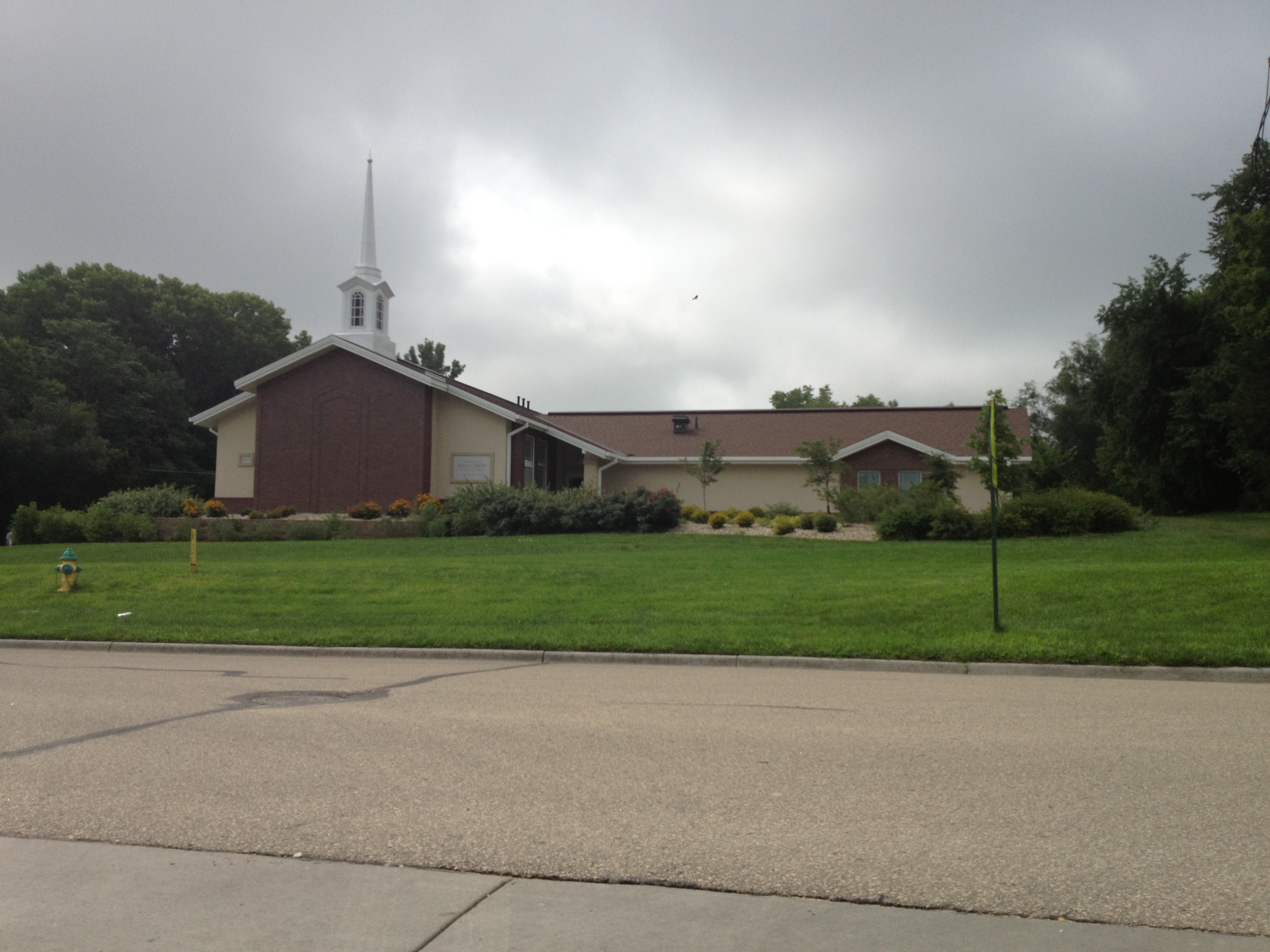
Church of Jesus Christ of Latter-Day Saints

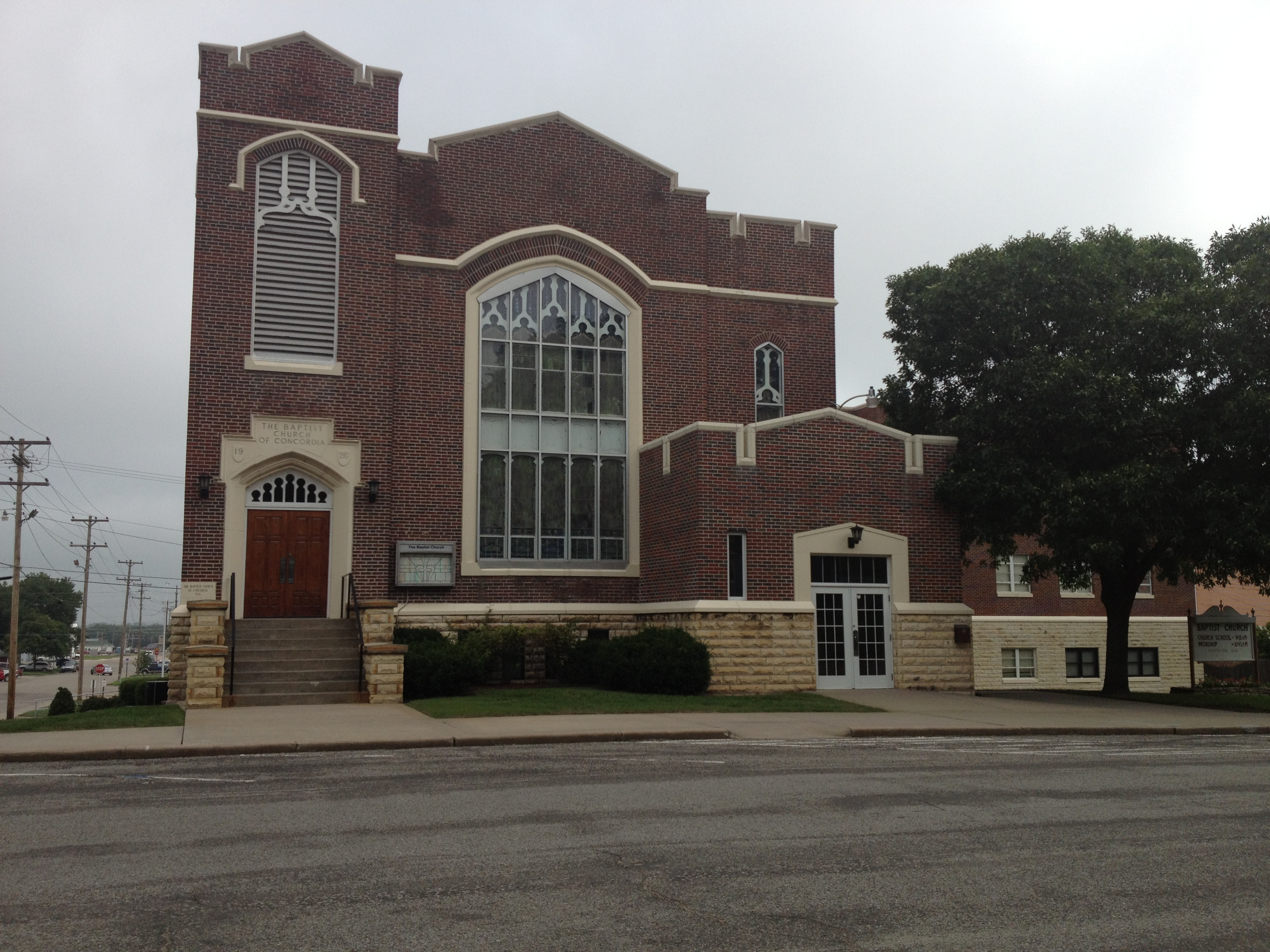
The Baptist Church

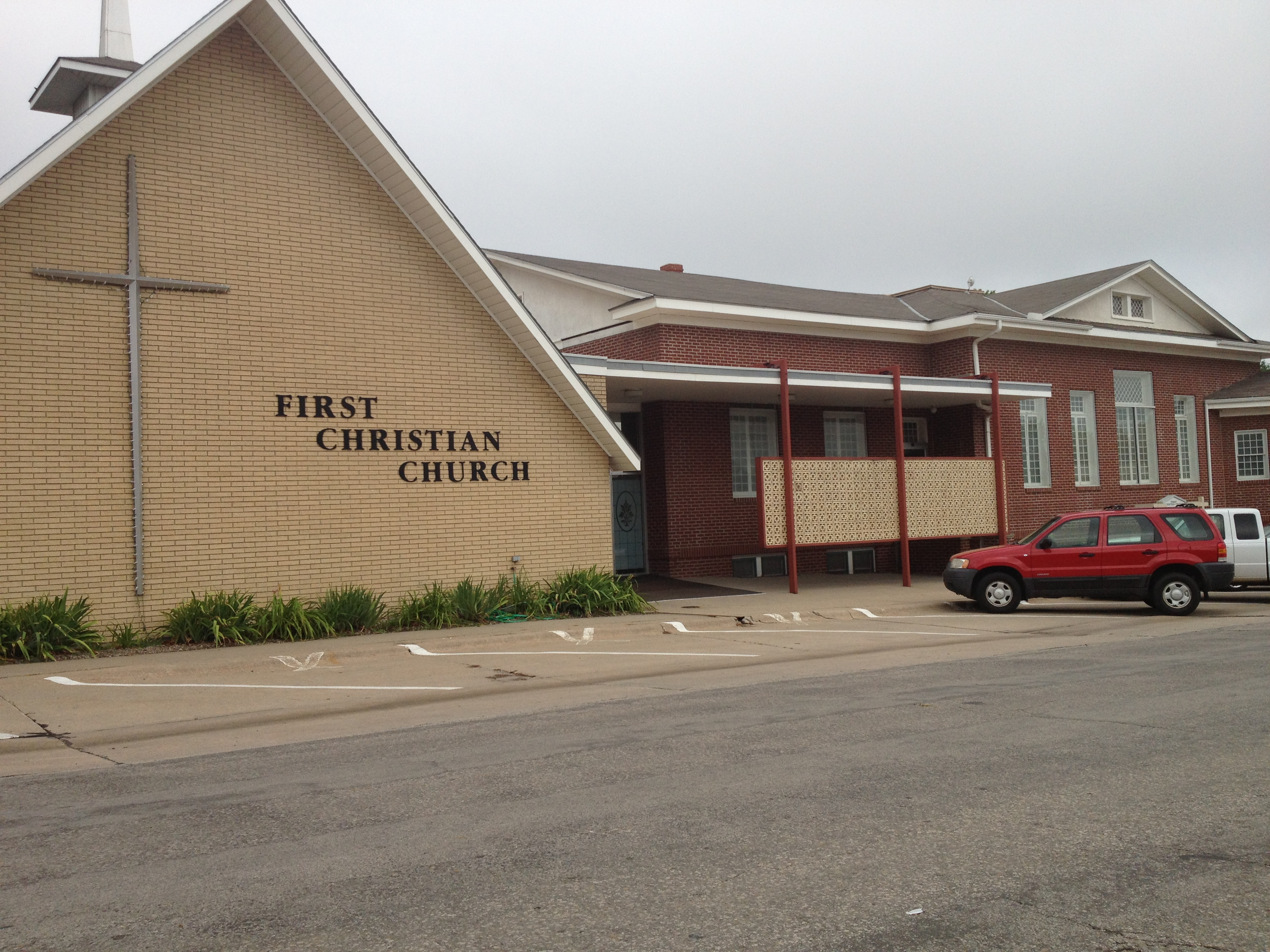
First Christian Church

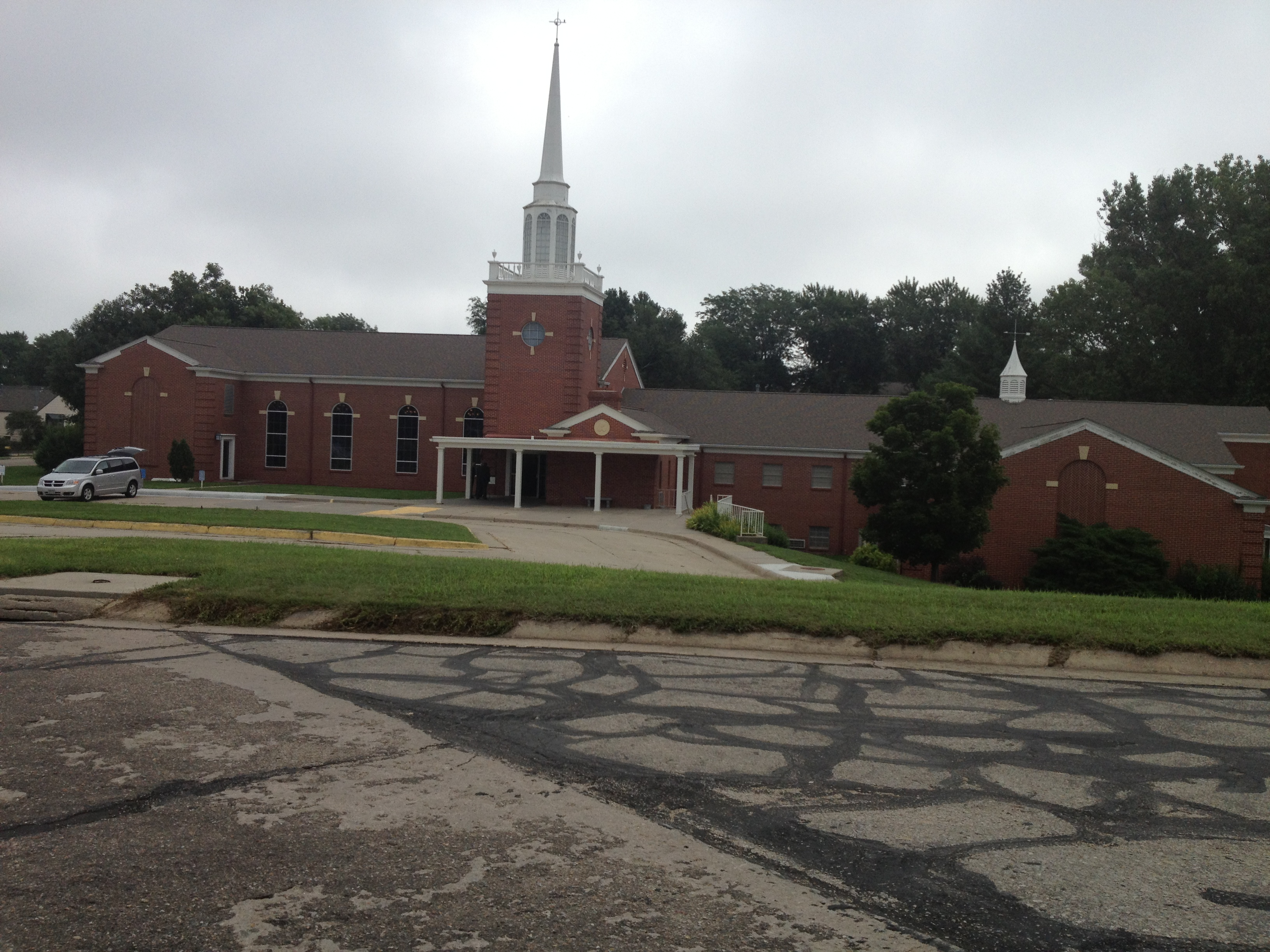
First United Methodist Church

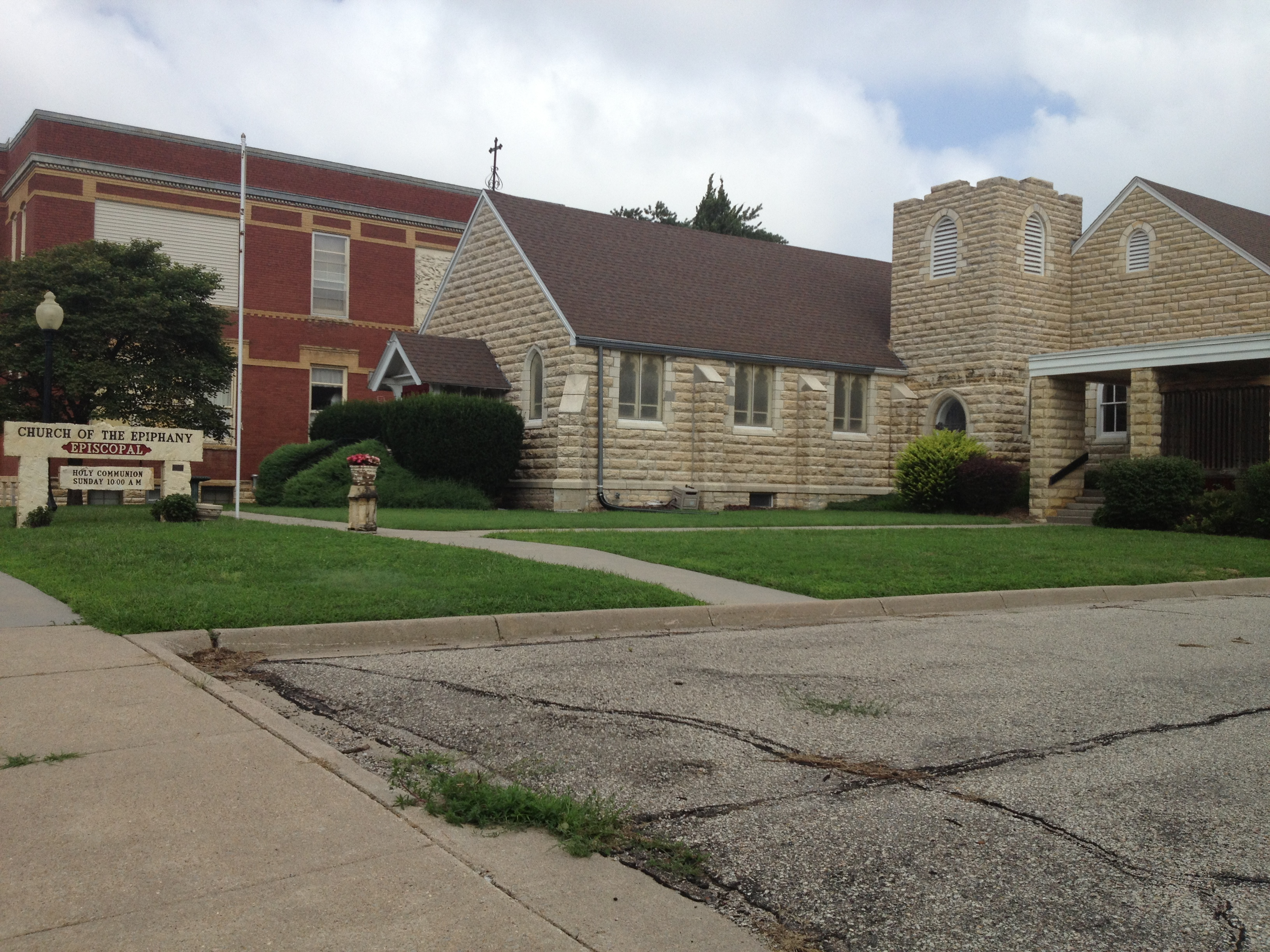
Episcopal Church

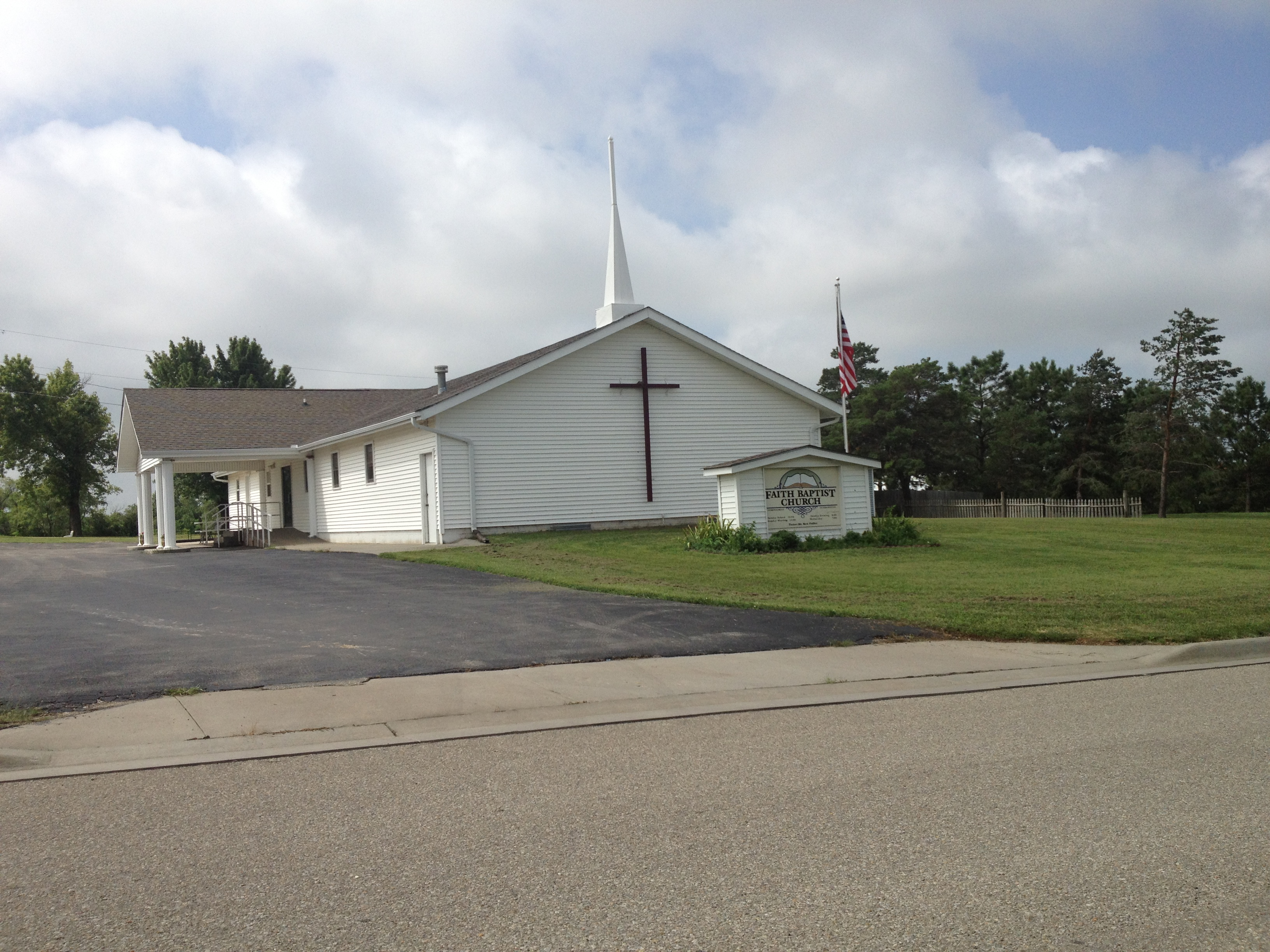
Faith Baptist Church

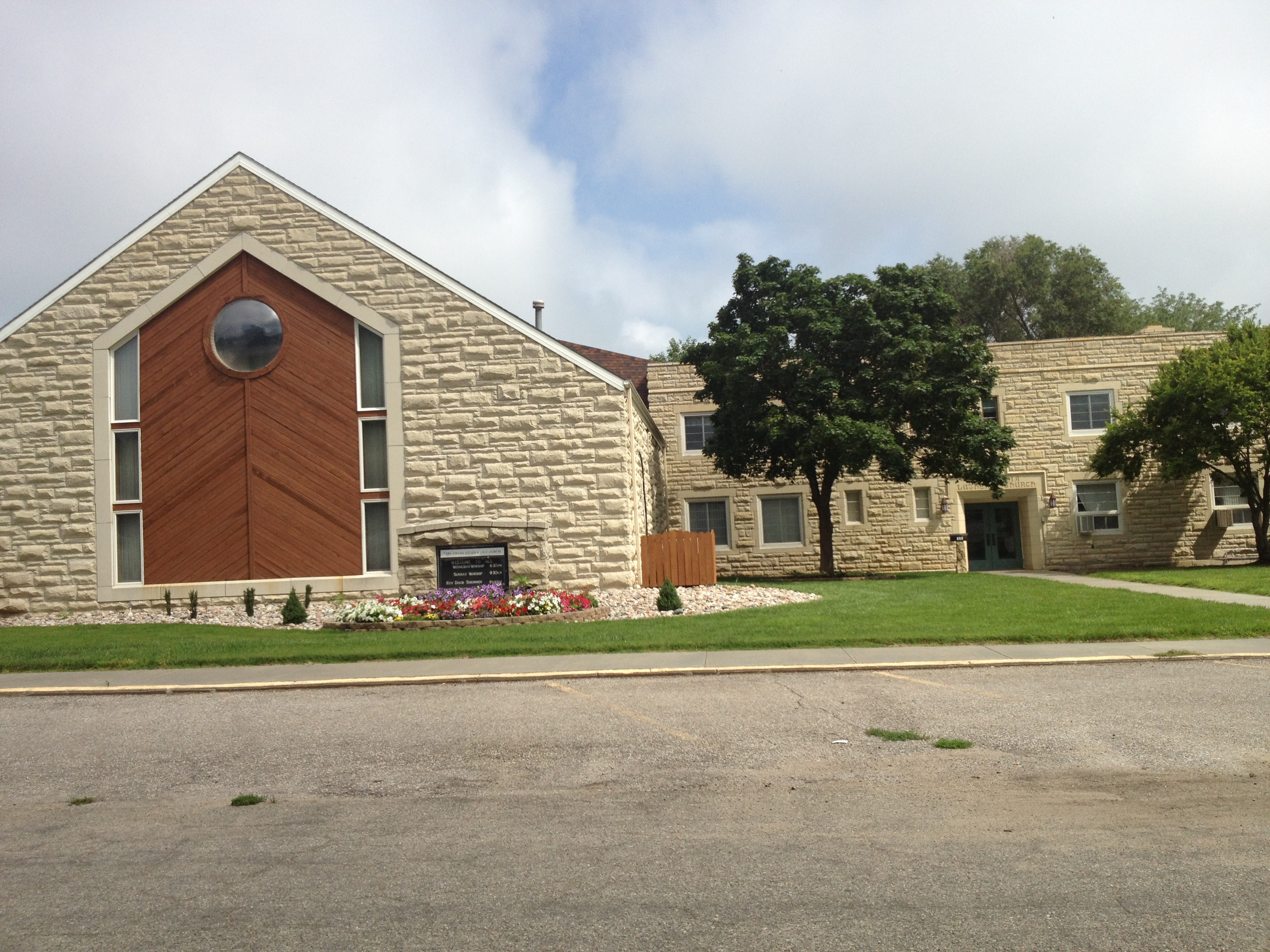
Lutheran Church

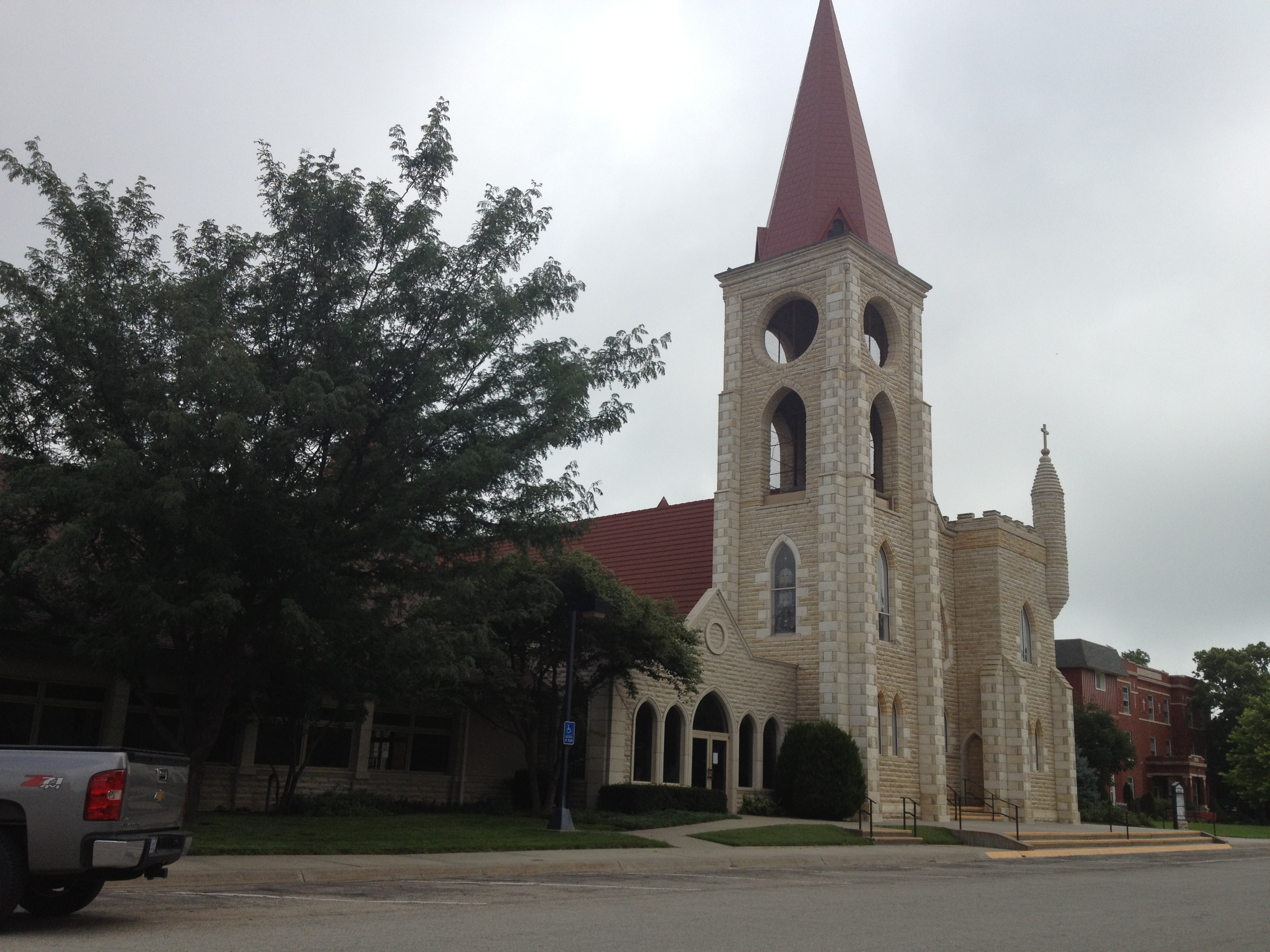
Our Lady of Perpetual Help Catholic Church

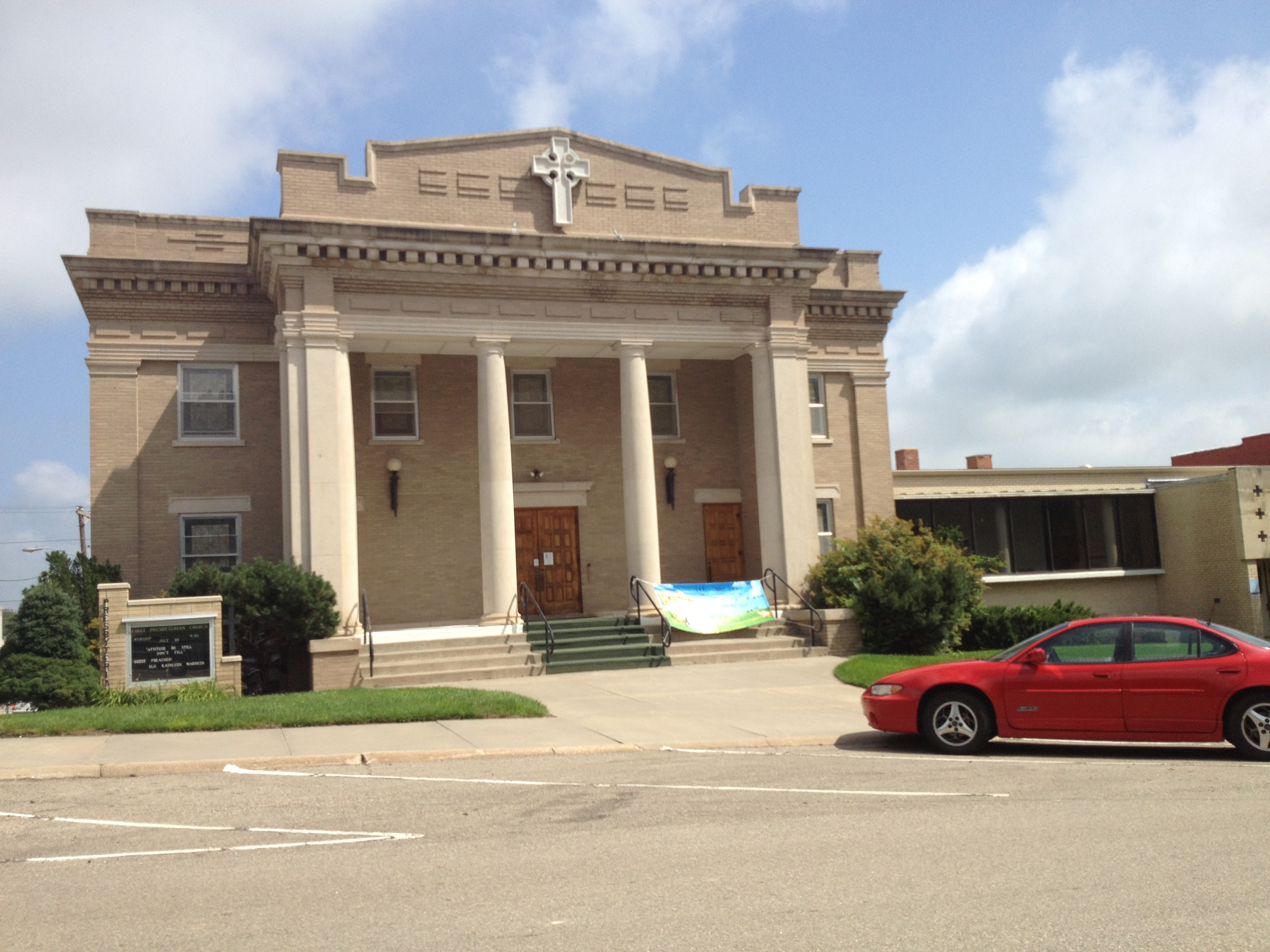
Presbyterian Church

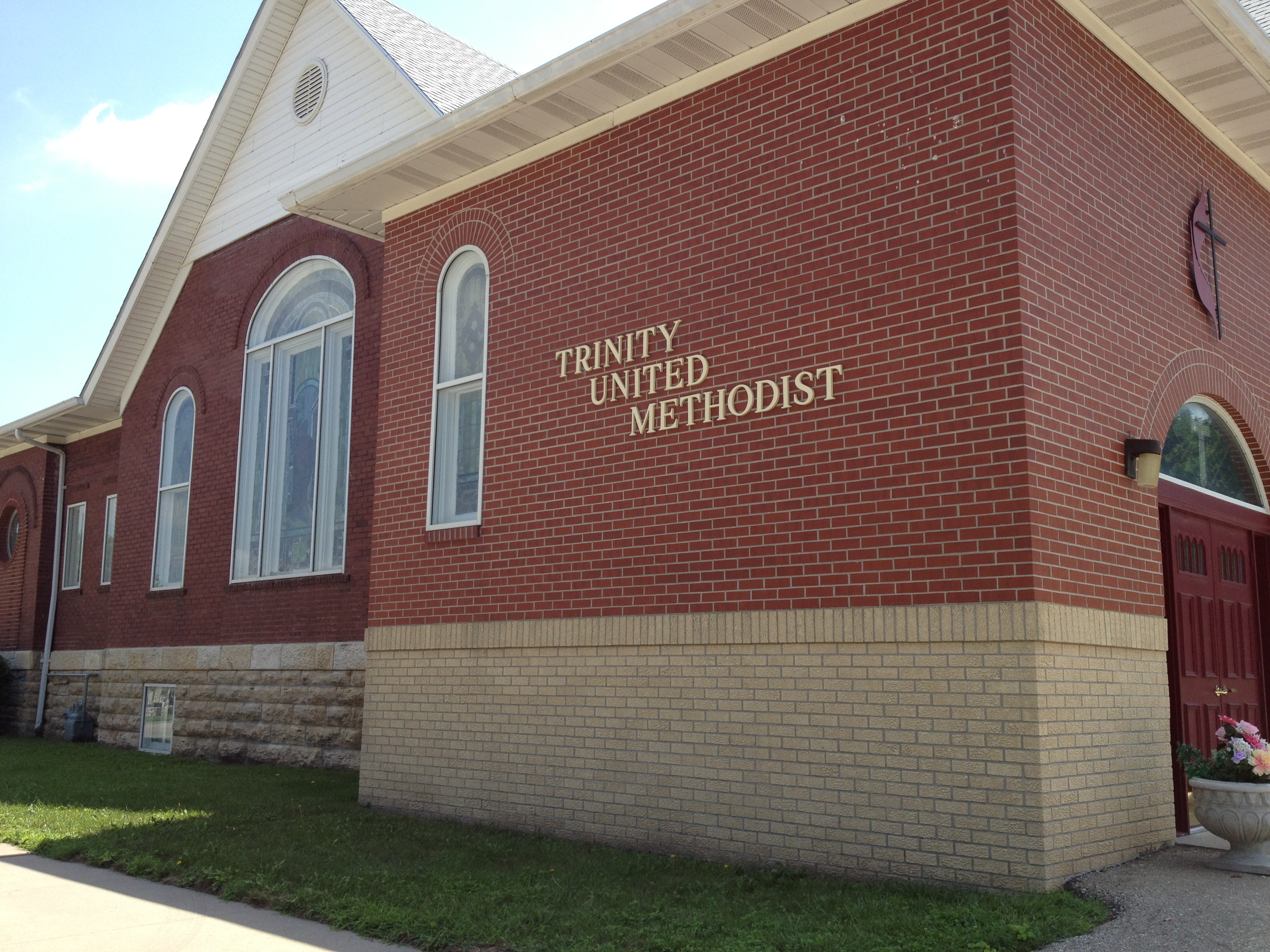
Trinity United Methodist Church

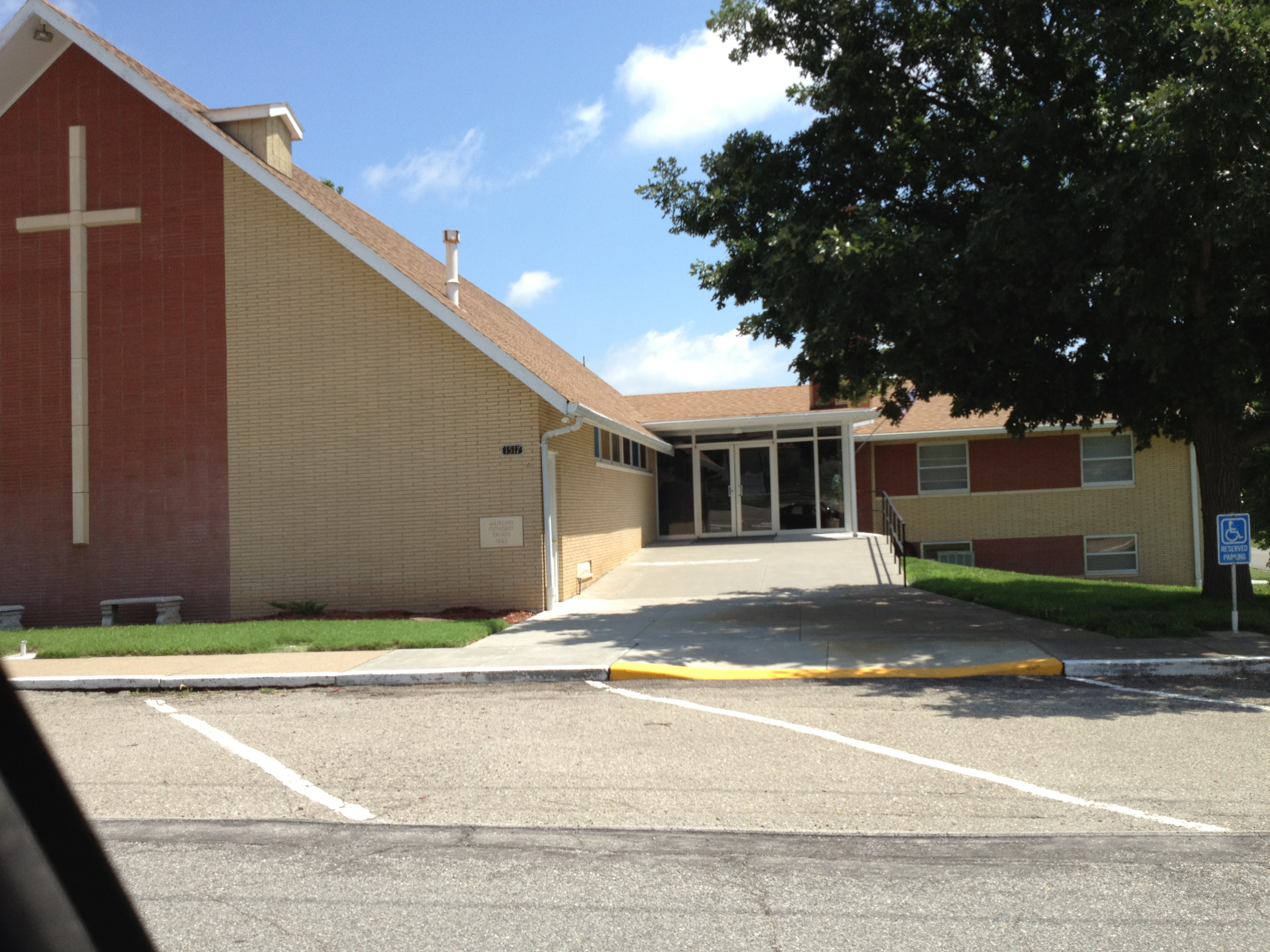
Wesleyan Church
