= Cloud County Veterans Memorial =

Coordinates: 39°34′09.53″N 97°39′38.84″W

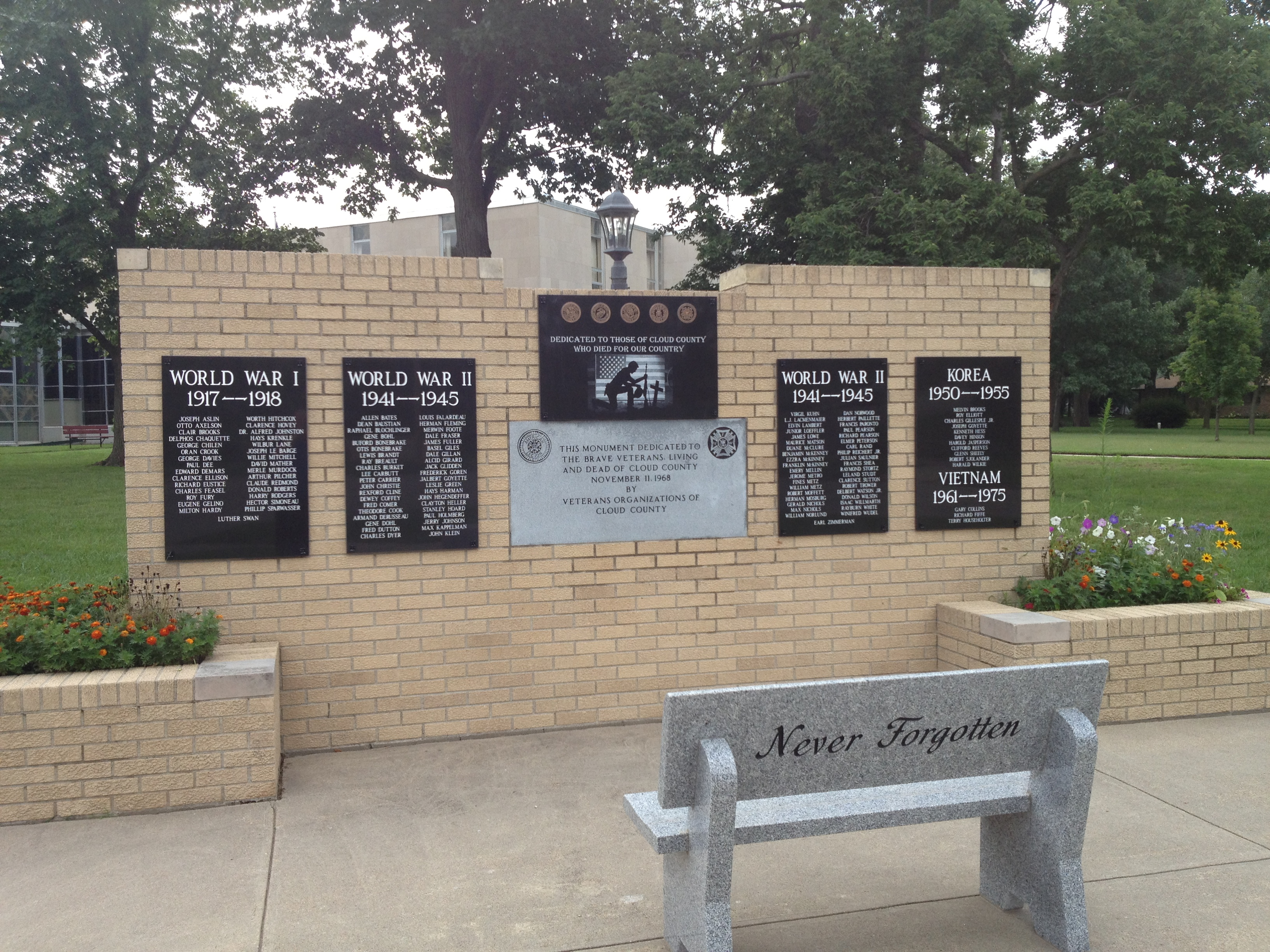
Cloud County Veterans Memorial (photo 2013)

The Cloud County Veterans Memorial is a monument located in Concordia, Kansas. The memorial includes an eternal flame that has been burning since the monument was established on November 11, 1968. The memorial is located in the northwest corner of the county courthouse square.

The engraved plaque on the memorial reads:

THIS MONUMENT DEDICATED TO
THE BRAVE VETERANS LIVING
AND DEAD OF CLOUD COUNTY
NOVEMBER 11, 1968
BY
VETERANS ORGANIZATIONS OF
CLOUD COUNTY

== Image gallery ==
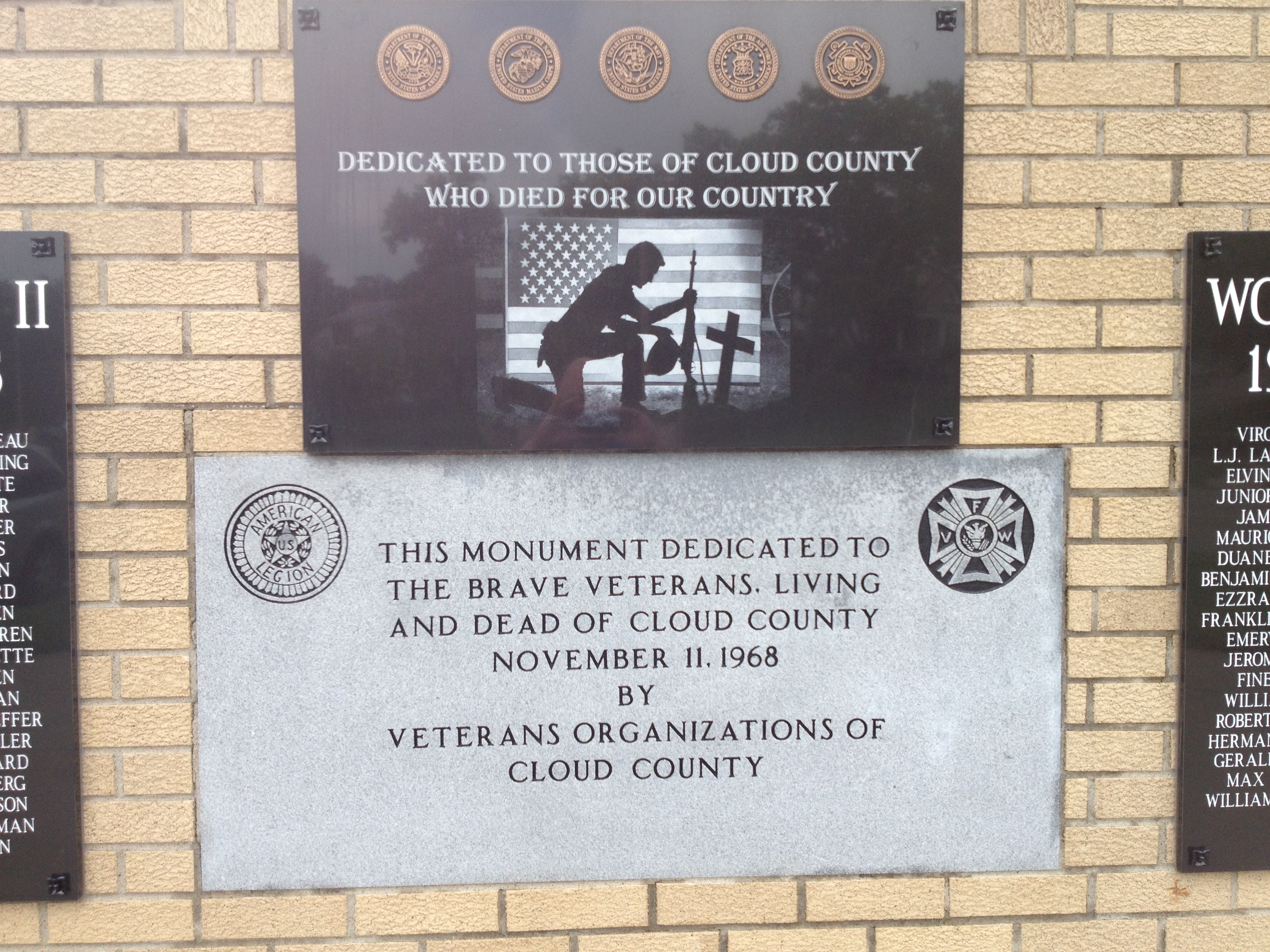
center artwork

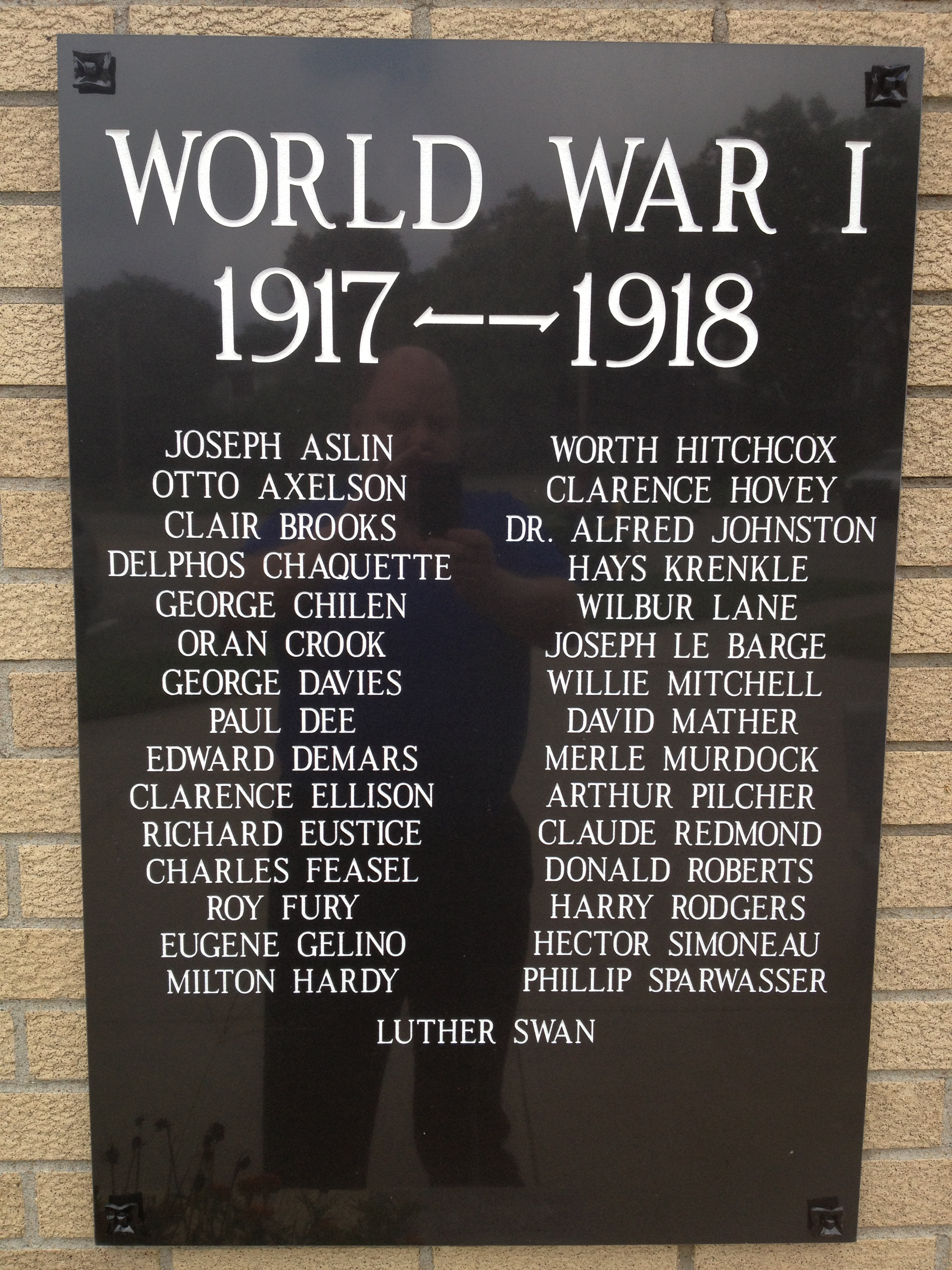
World War 1

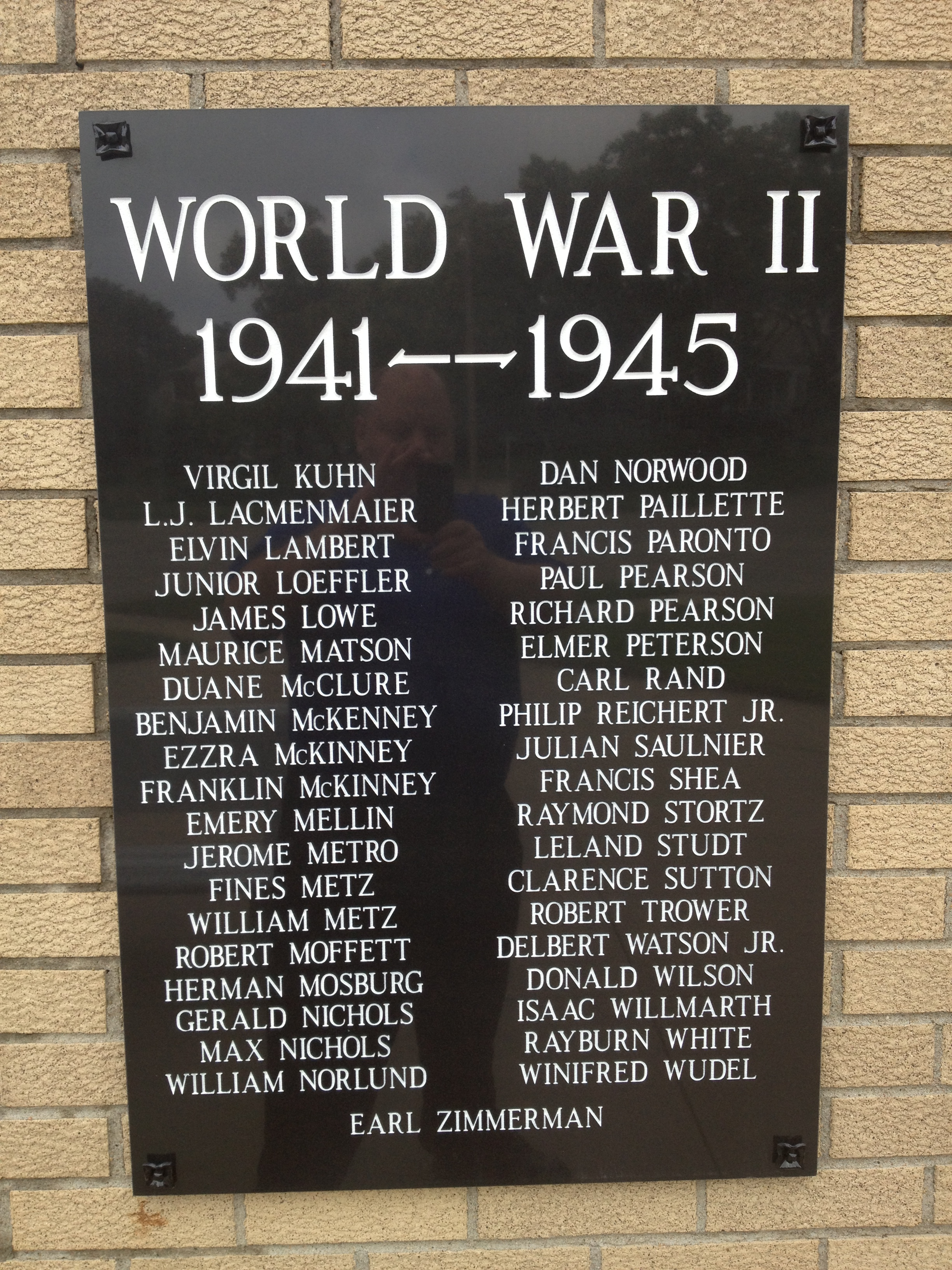
World War II (part 1)

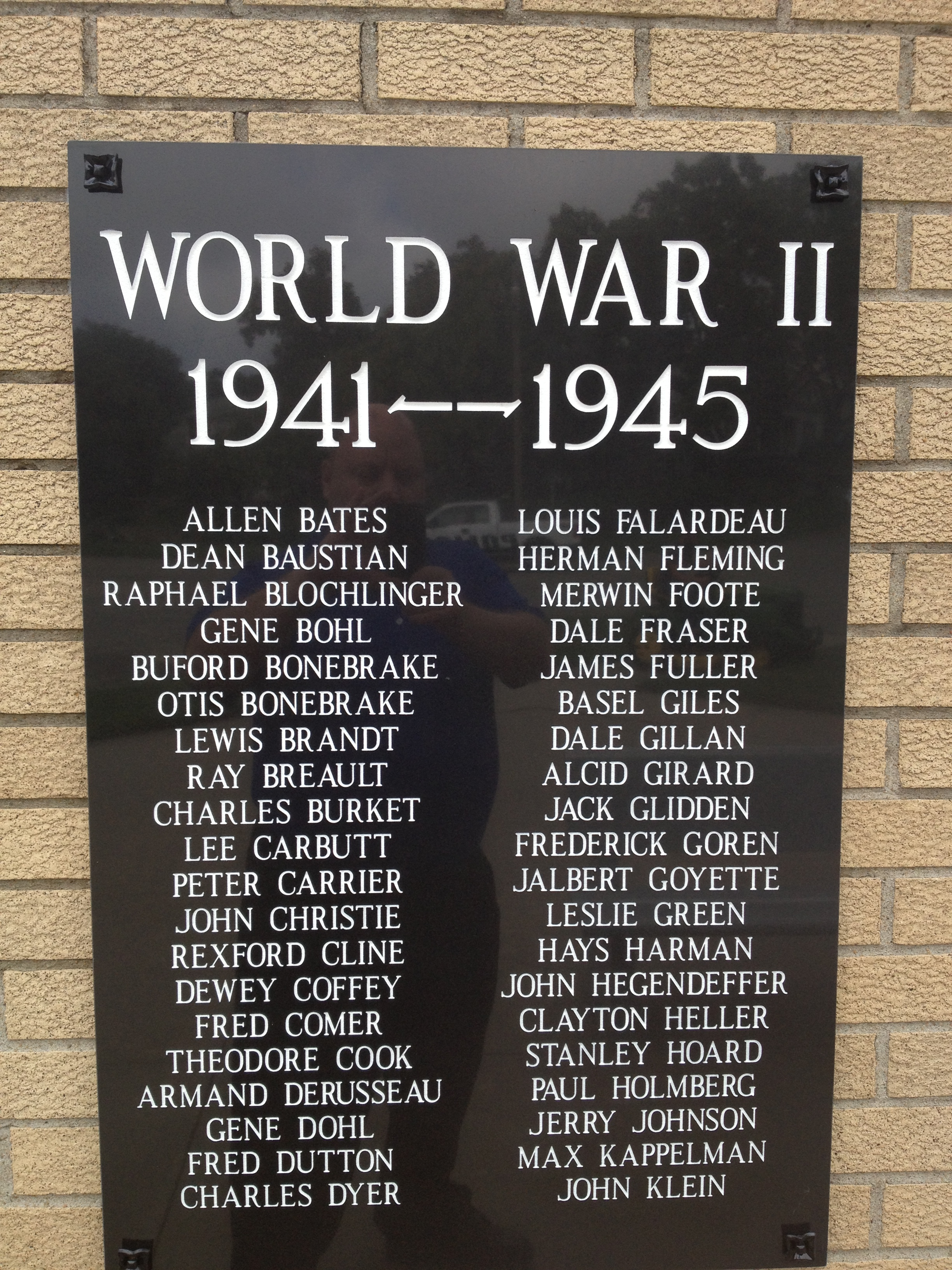
World War II (part2)

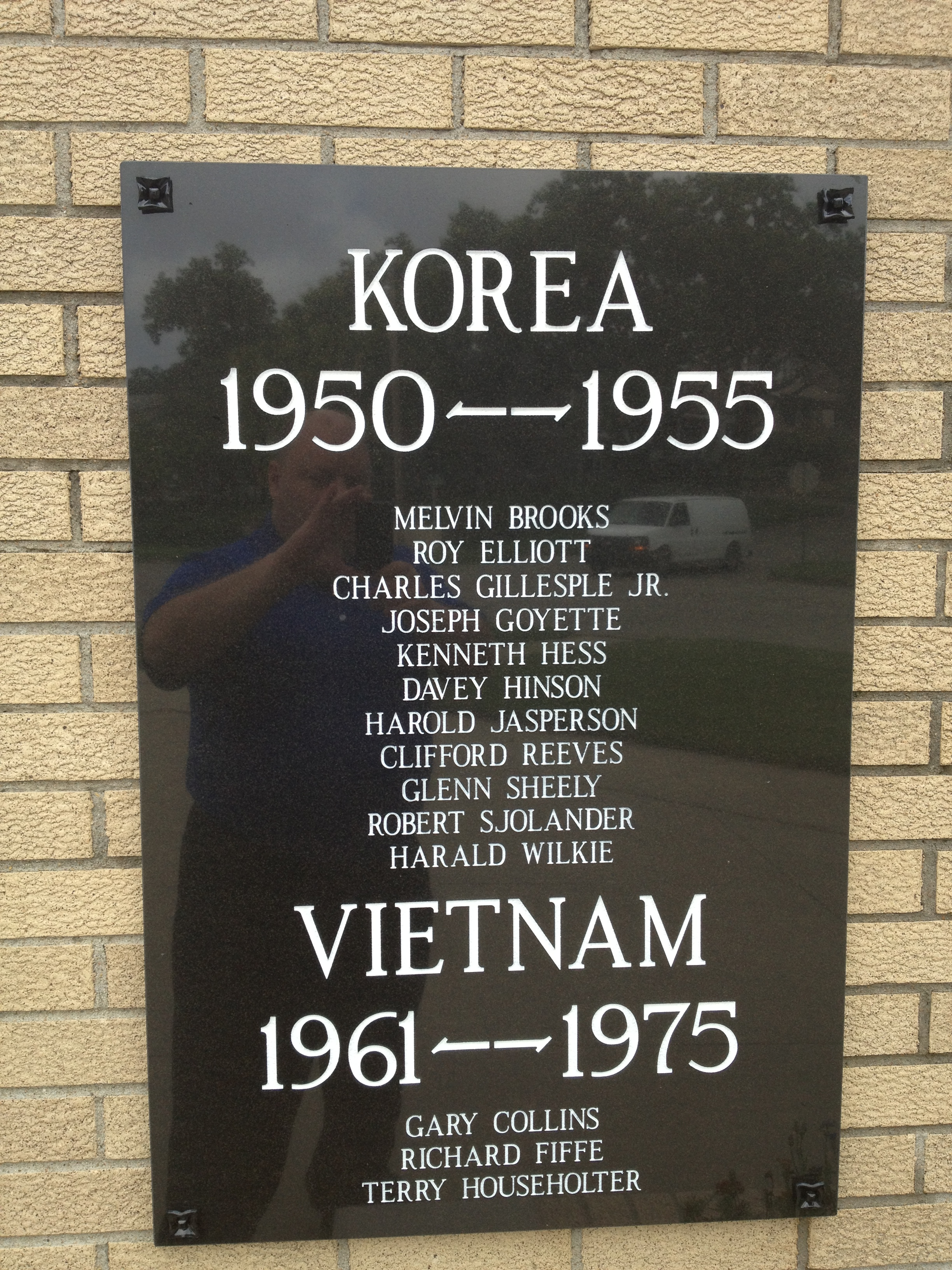
Korea and Vietnam

Cloud County Veteran's Memorial (2007, before plaque additions)
