= KVCO =

- Concordia, Kansas; United States
- Broadcast area: Cloud County, Kansas
- Frequency: 88.3 MHz
- Branding: 88.3 KVCO

Programming
- Format: Active Rock/College Radio

Ownership
- Owner: Cloud County Community College

History
- First air date: 1977
- Call sign meaning: "Voice of Concordia"

Technical information
- Licensing authority: FCC
- Facility ID: 12065
- Class: A
- ERP: 125 watts
- HAAT: 23 meters (75 feet)
- Transmitter coordinates: 39°33′17.0″N 97°39′48.0″W

Links
- Public license information: Public file; LMS
- Website: KVCO by CCCC

KVCO (88.3 FM) is a nonprofit radio station licensed to serve Concordia, Kansas. The station is owned and operated by Cloud County Community College. KVCO helps would-be radio workers train for the radio industry. It airs an active rock/college radio format, with music of varying genres.

With a power of 125 watts, the station's range is a radius of approximately 15 miles (24 km). With the exception of General Manager, positions are voluntary, and the station is run somewhat like a collegiate club or interest organization.

KVCO began broadcasting in early 1977.

== See also ==
- Campus radio
- List of college radio stations in the United States
