= Cloud County Community College =

Public college in Concordia, Kansas, US

Coordinates: 39°33′16″N 97°39′50″W

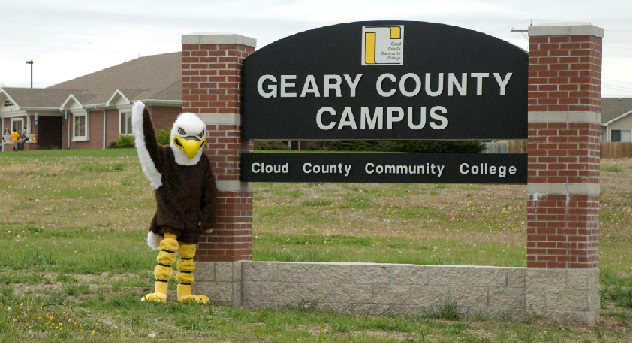
- Cloud County Campus (2011)
- Motto: Going Anywhere Starts Here!
- Type: Public community college
- Established: 1965 (Concordia); 1997 (Junction City)
- President: Amber Knoettgen
- Students: 1,686 (Fall 2023)
- Location: Concordia and Junction City, Kansas, United States
- Campus: Rural
- Colors: Black and gold
- Nickname: Thunderbirds
- Website: cloud.edu
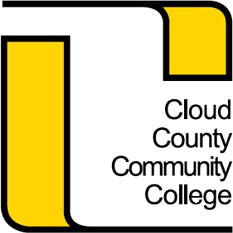

Cloud County Community College is a public community college with campuses in Concordia and Junction City, Kansas.

== Concordia campus ==
Cloud County Community College was founded in Concordia in 1965 and began classes in the Concordia Junior-Senior High School. The college moved to its present site in 1968. The architecture of the main campus is that of "pods" which are designed to evoke the rolling hills of the area. The athletic teams are known as the Thunderbirds (men) and Lady Thunderbirds (women). CCCC was the 2001 NJCAA national champion in women's basketball, 2010 Men's Soccer, 2019 Men's Outdoor Track and Field, and 2019 Men's Cross Country. Housing is provided by 13 campus apartments located in "T-Bird Village" across the street from the main campus building, "Thunder Heights" located just west of the main building, and "Hillside Apartments", which is located a mile away from the main campus. CCCC is home to the first Wind Energy Technology program in Kansas and uses both wind and geo-thermal energy to operate portions of the campus electrical system.

== Geary County campus ==
The Geary County Campus (GCC) is located in Junction City. Hosting primarily a non-traditional and diverse student population, the campus offers several career and transfer programs. Since the college is near Fort Riley, it serves military veterans, active duty military members, and their families. With a variety of day, evening, and weekend course offerings, students taking classes have the privilege of flexible class scheduling. Along with its service to Fort Riley, home of the Big Red One, this commuter campus serves over 300 students from the surrounding area and provides transferable courses to regional institutions such as Kansas State University and Manhattan Area Technical College. The unique nature of this branch campus enables it to operate under the oversight of a Campus Director, seventeen full-time faculty and staff and over forty adjunct faculty, many of whom also teach for Kansas State University and other educational entities in the area. The GCC has an active Phi Theta Kappa honor society, TRiO services, adult basic education, student veterans club, anatomy & physiology club, fine arts club, and a chapter of Student Senate. Cloud County Community College is a Service Member Opportunity College (SOC).

== Academics ==
- Associate of Arts
- Associate of Science
- Associate in Applied Science
- Associate in General Studies

== Athletics ==
The athletic program at Cloud County Community College fields 11 varsity teams and competes in the Western Division of the Kansas Jayhawk Community College Conference.

== KVCO ==
The college maintains KVCO Radio Station (FM 88.3) and plays an alternative music format. The station is considered a "full service" FM station by the Federal Communications Commission.

== Cumulus ==
Cumulus is the completely digital yearbook for Cloud County Community College. It is the product of two classes and multiple volunteers.

== Notable alumni ==
- Clay Aurand, Kansas State Representative 109th District
- Derek Cooke (born 1991), basketball player for Hapoel Gilboa Galil of the Israeli Basketball Premier League
- Jake Diekman, pitcher for the Texas Rangers
- Raymond Radway, former NFL player
- Erik Sabrowski pitcher for the Cleveland Guardians
