= Sam E. Roberts =

American otolaryngologist

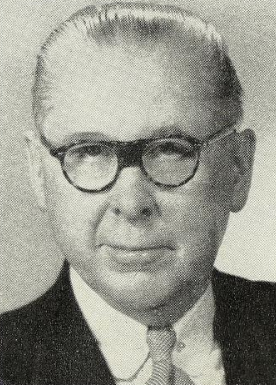
- Born: 28 October 1887; Concordia, Kansas
- Died: 18 July 1966 (aged 78); Mission Hills, Kansas
- Occupation: Otolaryngologist

Sam Earl Roberts (28 October 1887 – 18 July 1966) was an American otolaryngologist, medical academic, inventor, and medical writer.

Roberts was born in Concordia, Kansas to Samuel James and Helen Roberts. He graduated M.D. from the University of Kansas School of Medicine in 1911 and in 1912 did postgraduate work in otolaryngology at the University of Vienna. He joined the faculty of the University of Kansas School of Medicine in 1913 and was Clinical Assistant for several years, assistant professor during 1916–1919 and Professor of Otolaryngology until his retirement in 1950.

During the World War I he served in the U.S. Army Medical Corps. In the early 1940s he invented and patented a laryngoscope. He was a member of the American Academy of Ophthalmology and the American Bronchoesophagological Association. He married Ada Blanch Woodward in 1913, they had three daughters. Woodward died in 1938. He married Mary Roberts in 1943.

In 1958, Roberts authored Ear, Nose and Throat Dysfunctions Due to Deficiencies and Imbalances, which argued that many otolaryngological complaints are due to nutritional deficiencies.

Roberts died in Mission Hills, Kansas on 18 July 1966.

== Selected publications ==
- Nutritional Deficiencies in Otolaryngology (1942)
- Ear, Nose and Throat Dysfunctions Due to Deficiencies and Imbalances (with a foreword by Morris Fishbein, 1957)
- Exhaustion: A New Approach to the Treatment of Allergy (1967)
