= Kent Osborne (director) =

American actor and film director

- Other names: Ken Osborne, Kenneth Osborne
- Occupations: Film director, actor
- Years active: 1956 - 2000s

Kent Osborne aka Ken Osborne was an American film director and occasional actor. The films he has directed have mainly been exploitation types. His films include Wild Wheels in 1969, Cain's Cutthroats in 1971, The Ballad of Billie Blue in 1972, Women Unchained in 1974 and Hollywood Confidential in 2008.

== Career (director) ==
=== 1960s ===
His earliest directorial work includes Raw Love which was released in 1965. It featured Suzanne Anderson and Mike Perry. Osborne both directed the 1996 biker exploitation flick Wild Wheels as well as co-writing the story. The film starred Don Epperson, Robert Dix, Casey Kasem, Terry Stafford, and Dovie Beams who would later find notoriety for her affair with President Ferdinand Marcos. During the filming of Wild Wheels, Osborne was shooting a segment with a foreground and background scene. He told the men in the background that he wanted some fighting but he forgot to tell them it was only supposed to be faked. Some of it got carried away and Osborne was yelling at them to stop it and repeatedly to cut.

=== 1970s to 1980s ===
He found a good degree of success with Cain's Cutthroats aka The Blood Seekers, a sleazy violent vengeance western that was set in the civil war era, which starred John Carradine, Scott Brady, Robert Dix, Darwin Joston, and Adair Jameson. Osborne directed and co-wrote the story for The Ballad of Billie Blue, a Christian-themed film with a warning message which was about a country singer who ends up in jail then finds stardom with gospel music. The film premiered in Grand Rapids, Michigan in February, 1972, also opened Thursday April 20, 1972 at the Holland Theatre and was showing for a week. It was nominated for two Image Awards. Women Unchained, which he directed was a story about five women who during a riot, try to escape from a maximum security prison and while on the run will do what it takes to get to the Mexican border.

=== 1990s to 2000s ===
In 2008, Hollywood Confidential was released. It starred Vernon Wells, Joe Estevez, James MacPherson, and Jesse Hlubik.

== Career (actor) ==
His earliest acting roles included Dragnet in 1954, Good Morning, Miss Dove and The View from Pompey's Head. He played the bartender in the 1969 horror film Nightmare in Wax, a Bud Townsend directed film which starred Cameron Mitchell, Scott Brady and Anne Helm. Osborne played the part of Dave Miller in the Al Adamson directed Five Bloody Graves, which was released around 1969, 1970. He played the part of Sergeant Osborne in the Ewing Miles Brown film The Stoneman which was released around 2002. The film starred Christopher Atkins, Pat Morita and Robin Riker.

He died at his West Hollywood, California, home on February 20, 2024, at age 97 of natural causes.

== Filmography list ==
Director and other
Title	Role	Director	Year	Notes #
Raw Love	Director	Kent Osborne	1965	
The Sorcerers	Sound mixer	Michael Reeves	1967	
Planet of the Apes	Makeup artist	Franklin J. Schaffner	1968	
Wild Wheels	Director, writer	Kent Osborne	1969	
Blood of Dracula's Castle	Special makeup effects	Al Adamson	1969	As Kenny Osborne
Five Bloody Graves	Makeup artist	Al Adamson	1969	
The Rebel Rousers	Makeup artist	Martin B. Cohen	1970	
Cain's Cutthroats	Director, producer Writer: additional dialogue	Kent Osborne	1971	
Layout for 5 Models	Sound recordist	John Gaudioz	1972	
The Ballad of Billie Blue	Director	Kent Osborne	1972	
An Eye for an Eye	Makeup artist	Larry G. Brown	1973	
Remember Me This Way	Sound recordist	Bob Foster; Ron Inkpen	1974	As Ken Osbourne
Women Unchained	Director, writer	Kent Osborne	1974	
Crime of Crimes	Boom operator	Alfredo Zacarias	1989	
Nude Aerobics	Director	Kent Osborne	1991	
The Stoneman	production supervisor	Ewing Miles Brown	2002	
Dismembered	Production coordinator	Ewing Miles Brown	2003	
Hollywood Confidential	Director, producer writer	Kent Osborne	2008	
Behaving Badly	Carpenter	Juan Drago	2009	

Actor
Title	Role	Director	Year	Notes #
Dragnet	Thief	Jack Webb	1954	
The View from Pompey's Head	Brother	Philip Dunne	1955	
Good Morning, Miss Dove	Brother	Henry Koster	1955	
Nightmare in Wax	Bartender	Bud Townsend	1969	
Blood of Dracula's Castle	Telegram Delivery Man	Al Adamson	1969	As Ken Osborne
The Ice House	Killer	Stuart McGowan	1969	As Ken Osborne
Five Bloody Graves	Dave Miller	Al Adamson	1969	
Hell's Bloody Devils		Al Adamson	1970	
Born on the Fourth of July	Paraplegic #2 - Miami Convention	Oliver Stone	1989	
Crime of Crimes		Alfredo Zacarias	1989	
The Stoneman	Sgt. Osborne	Ewing Miles Brown	2002	As J. Kenneth Osborne
Hell Is for Bastards	Narrator	Alex Justinger; Ben Robertson	2008	
