= Sherry Bain =

American actress

- Born: Sheri Gwyn Bain; May 26, 1948 (age 78); Los Angeles, California, U.S.
- Occupations: Actress; author
- Years active: 1970–1985

Sherry Bain (born Sheri Gwyn Bain; May 26, 1948) is an actress from Los Angeles, California. She started her career in some exploitation films. She co-starred with Robert Fuller in The Hard Ride in 1971, Wild Riders in 1971, The Ballad of Billie Blue in 1972, an episode of Bearcats!, Pipe Dreams in 1976, Poco... Little Dog Lost in 1977, and Wild and Wooly in 1978. By the early 1970s, her career was moving and she was on the verge of major stardom.

== Early life ==
Bain was the daughter of restaurant owners. Her parents ran The Sportsman Restaurant. She grew up in the resort town of Lake Arrowhead, which is in the mountains above Los Angeles. She attended the Rim of the World High School and graduated from there.

== Career ==
One day Bain's fate changed and a man came in to the supermarket where she was currently working. His name was John Cestare and she began studying acting with him. Her first few films were mainly biker films and she had the lead roles in them.

=== Biker genre ===
The first of the biker films was The Hard Ride which starred Robert Fuller. She played the part of the girlfriend of a black soldier who was killed in Vietnam. His friend (Played by Fuller) brings his body home and locates the biker club he belonged to. After the funeral she tries to understand the biker life. The film which was also called Carry Me Home Brother, premiered at Victorville. Bain was outside on the street with her mentor John Cestare and was signing autographs. She was aged 22 at the time and already had the Hollywood familiarity and a desire to stay in the business. She attracted the right kind of attention and had some very good reviews for her work in the film. A reviewer in The Los Angeles Times said the film really belonged to her and she was convincingly tough with her characterization of a complex woman. Daily Variety remarked on her striking screen presence, dramatic range and an ability to handle a range of screen roles. And from The San Diego Union, the reviewer said her performance was the best part of the movie. Her next biker film was The Wild Riders which also starred Alex Rocco, Elizabeth Knowles and Arell Blanton. Two bikers are kicked out of their club and they head to California. There they become a nightmare for two women, played by Bain and Knowles. Her next biker film was the Duke Kelly directed Ride the Hot Wind which starred Tommy Kirk, Cheryl Waters, Duke Kelly and Richard Ford Grayling.

=== 1970s to 1980s ===
Bain had the guest lead role in The Basic Moment which was an episode of Marcus Welby, M.D. split into two parts, playing the part of Evy Weckner. This was aired in 1972. Also that year she appeared in the TV movie, A Very Missing Person. Another film in 1972 was The Ballad of Billie Blue, a Christian themed film that starred Jason Ledger, Renny Roker, Ray Danton, and featured Erik Estrada in an early role. She appeared in the John Cassavetes directed film Opening Night which was released in 1977. She played the part of Jessica in the Philip Leacock directed western, Wild and Wooly which was released in 1978.

One of her last films was El Norte. By 1985 she had called it quits.

== Later years ==
Since leaving the acting profession, Bain had become a Christian and had settled in Palm Springs and was working with children that had developmental issues. She also became the author and illustrator of children's books, one of which was Benjamin Gets Saved, a story about a rabbit.

== Filmography ==
Film
Title	Role	Director	Year	Notes #
The Hard Ride	Sheryl	Burt Topper	1971	
Wild Riders	Laure	Richard Kanter	1971	
Calliope	Clerk	Matt Cimber	1971	
Ride the Hot Wind		Duke Kelly	1971	
The Ballad of Billie Blue	Reba	Kent Osborne	1972	
A Very Missing Person	Eve Granger	Russ Mayberry	1972	Made for television
Your Three Minutes Are Up	Sugar	Douglas N. Schwartz	1973	
Pipe Dreams	Loretta	Stephen F. Verona	1976	
Poco... Little Dog Lost	Mrs. McKinna	Dwight Brooks	1977	
Opening Night	Barmaid	John Cassavetes	1977	
Wild and Wooly	Jessica	Philip Leacock	1978	

Television
Title	Episode #	Role	Director	Year	Notes #
The Dating Game		Herself		1968	
Bearcats!	The Devil Wears Armor	Rose	Harry Harvey Jr.	1971	
Marcus Welby, M.D.	The Basic Moment: Part 1	Evy Weckner	Marc Daniels	1972	
Marcus Welby, M.D.	The Basic Moment: Part 2	Evy Weckner	Marc Daniels	1972	
Emergency!	Weird Wednesday	Kathy Paxton	Lawrence Dobkin	1972	
The Partners	The 217 in 402	Sgt. Mulligan	Richard Benedict	1972	
Barnaby Jones	Image of Evil	Faye Winston	Leo Penn	1975	
Starsky and Hutch	JoJo	Elaine Stroud	George McCowan	1976	
