= The Ballad of Billie Blue =

- Directed by: Ken Osborne
- Screenplay by: Robert Dix; William Kerwin; Ralph Luce
- Story by: Robert Dix; William Kerwin; Ralph Luce
- Produced by: Robert Plekker
- Starring: Jason Ledger; Renny Roker; Sherry Bain; Ray Danton; Sherry Miles; Bob Plekker; Erik Estrada; Johnny Green; Bruce Kimball
- Cinematography: Ralph Waldo
- Edited by: Renn Reynolds
- Music by: Richard Wess
- Release date: 1972
- Running time: 107 mins
- Country: United States
- Language: English

The Ballad of Billie Blue (Jailbreakin') is a Christian-themed film that stars Jason Ledger, Renny Roker, Ray Danton, and Sherry Bain. It also features Erik Estrada. A country singer who has a problem with alcohol is sent to prison for a crime he didn't commit.

== Story ==
A country music singer played by Jason Ledger is wrongly convicted of a crime and as a result ends up being on a Southern chain gang. Marty Allen in a serious role plays a reporter for a scandal newspaper who reports on the singer.

== Background ==
=== Screenings ===
The film premiered in Grand Rapids, Michigan in February, 1972. The film opened Thursday April 20, 1972 at the Holland Theatre and was showing for a week. It was scheduled for screening at the Peoria Christian Center on Saturday, July 19, 1975. The film was showing at the Grand Theatre in July 1976. An organization called Christian Young People had the film showing at the Ottawa Technical High School at 8PM, April 26, 1979.

=== Awards ===
The film was nominated for two Image Awards.

=== Releases ===
The film was released on video with the title Jailbreakin'. It has also been released as Star-Crossed Roads. The video release is 78 minutes. A review by HR in 1972 running time as 107 minutes. Another source noted that a release of the film through Gateway Films had it 90 minutes.

=== Reviews ===
Hanko Herman of The Reformed Free Publishing Association referred to it as "a filthy piece of pornography" in his article "The Christian And Movies" that appeared in Issue: 11, 3/1/1972. This was due to some of the content in the film.

== Cast ==
Johnny Green of Johnny Green and the Greenmen appears in the film. He band also contributed to the music.

=== Cast list (listed alphabetically) ===
- Marty Allen ... Harvey Trip
- Sherry Bain ... Reba Stone
- Ray Danton ... Carlton Jacobs
- Erik Estrada ... Justin
- Jason Ledger ... Billie Blue
- Sherry Miles ... May Blue
- Bob Plekker ...Preacher Bob
- Renny Roker ... Al
