= Robert Broyles =

American actor

- Born: Robert Houston Broyles; January 20, 1933; Sparta, Tennessee, U.S.
- Died: February 12, 2011 (aged 78); Los Angeles, California, U.S.
- Occupations: Actor, drama teacher, theatre director, writer
- Years active: 1964–2000

Robert Houston Broyles (January 20, 1933 – February 12, 2011) was an American character actor, drama teacher, theatre director, and writer. He was sometimes billed as Bob Broyles or Bobby Broyles.

== Early life ==
Broyles was born in Sparta, Tennessee, on January 20, 1933. He grew up in White County, Tennessee. His parents were Elise A. Bennette and Robert Lee Broyles Jr.

He served in the U. S. Navy from 1952 to 1956. He then attended Ohio State University and earned a Bachelor of Arts degree in 1960. From 1963 to 1967, he was a drama coach in Hollywood. He made his first television appearance in 1964 on Bonanza in the episode "The Cheating Game" as Tom, one of the ranch hands.

== Career ==
In the late 1960s, he began to appear on many television shows, appearing three times each on My Three Sons and The Mod Squad, and twice on Family Affair. During this time, he appeared in one movie called Fever Heat. He began to appear in more films, including Eat My Dust, Close Encounters of the Third Kind, Norma Rae, and Poltergeist. Broyles continued appearing on television shows and movies throughout the 1970s and 1980s. He returned to working as a drama coach in Los Angeles from 1982 to 1987. He appeared in the Andy Griffith Show reunion movie Return to Mayberry in 1986, sharing a comical boat scene with Don Knotts.

Besides working as an actor in theatre, he also worked as a writer and director. He wrote the plays Sparta in 1975 and Natural Affection in 1989 and wrote the novel Agness in 1977. In 1974, he was voted best actor in Los Angeles for his work in the play Tennessee Williams and was voted best director in Los Angeles for Three by Tennessee Plus. He also directed the play The Love Talker in 1994. The play was written by Deborah Pryor and starred Colleen Cochran, Ebba-Marie Gendron, and Donald Wayne Jarman.

Broyles made few appearances on television and in movies in the 1990s but continued to offer acting classes called Total Acting Class. His last role was in 2000 on the television show Bette starring Bette Midler. He died at the age of 78 in Los Angeles in 2011.

== Filmography ==
- Fever Heat (1968) as Loren Peale
- Eat My Dust (1976) as Bud the Driver
- Poco: Little Dog Lost (1977) as Deputy Sheriff Bob
- Close Encounters of the Third Kind (1977) as Dirty Tricks #3
- Record City (1978) as Workman
- Born Again (1978) as John Erlichman
- Norma Rae (1979) as Sam Bolen
- Friendly Fire (1979, TV Movie)
- Raise The Titanic (1980) as Willis
- Poltergeist (1982) as Pool Worker #1
- Memorial Day (1983, TV Movie) as Preacher
- Why Me? (1984, TV Movie)
- California Girls (1985, TV Movie) as Limo Driver
- A Death in California (1985, TV Mini-Series) as Bradley Taylor
- Copacabana (1985, TV Movie) as Bar Patron
- Acceptable Risks (1986, TV Movie) as Second Councilman
- Return to Mayberry (1986, TV Movie) as Wilson
- Inherit The Wind (1988, TV Movie) as Man on Platform
- The Karen Carpenter Story (1989, TV Movie) as Bowl Emcee
- Sonny Boy (1989) as Mayor
- My Boyfriend's Back (1989, TV Movie) as Man in Lounge (credited as Bob Broyles)
- Fall From Grace (1990, TV Movie) as Construction Foreman
- Tom Clancy's Op Center (1995, TV Movie) as Chief

== Television ==
- Bonanza – episode – The Cheating Game (1964) as Tom
- Family Affair – episode – The Prize (1967) as messenger boy
- Family Affair – episode – Your Friend, Jody (1968) as counselor
- My Three Sons – episode – The Baby Nurse (1968) as John Hawkins
- The Mod Squad – episode – A Run for the Money (1969) as police officer Kent
- The Mod Squad – episode – The Debt (1969) as policeman
- The Mod Squad – episode – The Loser (1970) as police sergeant
- My Three Sons – episode – You Can't Go Home (1970) as policeman
- My Three Sons – episode – The Honeymoon (1970) as Max
- The High Chaparral – episode – The Badge (1970) as Loosh
- Mission: Impossible – episode – Nerves (1971) as mechanic
- The Streets of San Francisco – episode – Bitter Wine (1972) as Paul Croft
- Diana – episode – Who's Minding The Cat (1973) as Burf (credited as Bobby Broyles)
- Shazam – episode – The Road Back (1974) as officer
- Korg: 70,000 B.C. – episode – The Picture Maker (1974) as Moon's father
- Cannon – episode – Nightmare (1975) as Harold Kircher
- The Rockford Files – episode – The Aaron Ironwood School of Success (1975) as Hauss
- Police Woman – episode – The Melting Point of Ice (1976) as bartender
- Police Story – episode – Stigma (1977) as Hoby Simmons
- Lou Grant – episode – Babies (1978) as motel clerk
- The Bad News Bears – episode – Lights Out (1980) as clerk
- Flamingo Road – episode – Illicit Weekend (1981)
- Fantasy Island – episode – The Big Bet/Nancy and the Thunderbirds (1982) as the director
- The Dukes of Hazzard – episode – Big Brothers, Duke (1983) as The Man
- AfterMASH – episode – Les Misérables (1984) as bailiff
- The Wonderful World of Disney – episode – The Girl Who Spelled Freedom (1986) as Jim
- Matlock – episode – The Nurse (NBC) (1987) as Mark, the mechanic
- Square One TV: Mathnet – episode – Problem of the Passing Parade (1987) as man at dry cleaners (credited as Bob Broyles)
- Hart To Hart – episode – Home Is Where The Hart Is (1994) as Fred
- Bette – episode – And The Winner Is (2000) as older man (final appearance)
