= Ysabel MacCloskey =

American actress

- Ysabel MacCloskey in Bewitched 1971
- Born: January 20, 1915
- Died: March 11, 1981 (aged 66)
- Occupation: Actress

Ysabel MacCloskey (January 20, 1915 – March 11, 1981) was an American stage, film and television character actress.

She began her show business career after graduating from the University of California at Berkeley, where she performed in several productions at the Pasadena Playhouse. She was an original member of the American Conservatory Theater in San Francisco and later joined an opera company in Stuttgart, West Germany, where her husband was stationed.

== Filmography ==
- The Beverly Hillbillies (1968, TV Series) - Mrs. Vanderpont
- Yours, Mine and Ours (1968) - Housekeeper #1
- Star! (1968) - Guest in Gertie's Dressing Room (uncredited)
- Hawaii Five-O (1968, TV Series) - Landlady
- Green Acres (1969, TV Series) - Farm Woman
- Bewitched (1971, TV Series) - Aunt Hagatha / Martha Jameson / Mrs. Rockfield
- The Brotherhood of Satan (1971) - Witch
- Bedknobs and Broomsticks (1971) - Mrs. Jayne Mason (uncredited)
- Temperatures Rising (1972, TV Series) - Mrs. Right
- Bridget Loves Bernie (1972, TV Series) - Mother Superior
- The Waltons (1974, TV Series) - Mrs. Riddle
- The Streets of San Francisco (1973-1974, TV Series) - Martha / Mrs. Davenport / Ysabel, the maid
- The Practice (1976, TV Series) - Mrs. Brickman
- Corey: For the People (1977, TV Movie) - Mollie Schultz
- Poco... Little Dog Lost (1977) - Poco
- Deadly Game (1977, TV Movie) - Emma
- Loose Shoes (1978) - Ma Kettle
- Mork & Mindy (1978, TV Series) - The Woman
- Little House on the Prairie (1979, TV Series) - Widow Mumford
- The Power Within (1979, TV Movie) Grandma
- Benson (1980, TV Series) - Nurse Platt
- Terror Among Us (1981, TV Movie) - Mrs. Shaw (final appearance)
