= Robert E. Pearson =

American film director

Robert Eugene Pearson (January 31, 1928 – July 4, 2009) was a movie director, writer, and painter. He was involved in over 100 films.

== Early life ==
When Pearson was 12 years old, he left his hometown of Concordia, Kansas, on a three-year trek to California to get into show business. He had reportedly decided to make this trip himself after witnessing a band concert at Concordia High School when he was 10 years old.

== Movie career ==
In 1950, Pearson got his first big break when he met Norman Rice, who was hosting the weekly CBS radio show, This Is Our America. He was hired to play seven characters on the show. His work there led to minor roles in other movies. Pearson also served as official videographer for stars receiving the Golden Palm Awards, including Mickey Rooney, James Earl Jones, and Robert Stack. In the early 1990s, Pearson also filmed and directed the entire classical musical videos of Jan Davis, guitarist, Davis' largest twelve video effort 'Concert by the Sea' available on 'YouTube'.

While in Hollywood, Pearson directed three films: Godchildren (1973), The Devil and LeRoy Bassett (1973), and Claws (1977). The movie, The Devil and LeRoy Bassett starring Don Epperson, premiered at the Brown Grand Theatre in Concordia, Kansas, where Robert previously had lived. This was the last movie to be shown at the theater before its restoration.

== Paintings ==
Throughout his film and television career, Pearson wrote poetry and created art in his spare time. He lived in Clay Center, Kansas, and painted oils and acrylics nearly every day and regularly exhibited his work in regional galleries.

Pearson had Parkinson's disease for nearly a decade, was blind in his right eye and legally blind in his left eye, plus he was color-blind his entire life. This made his ability to create paintings even more extraordinary.

== Personal life ==
As of 2004, a family member's obituary reported he was still living in Clay Center, Kansas.

He died on July 4, 2009, in Clay Center, Kansas.
