= Bandolero! =

1968 film by Andrew V. McLaglen

- Theatrical release poster
- Directed by: Andrew V. McLaglen
- Screenplay by: James Lee Barrett
- Based on: Mace a story by Stanley Hough (as Stanley L. Hough)
- Produced by: Robert L. Jacks
- Starring: James Stewart; Dean Martin; Raquel Welch; George Kennedy; Andrew Prine; Will Geer; Clint Ritchie
- Cinematography: William H. Clothier
- Edited by: Folmar Blangsted
- Music by: Jerry Goldsmith
- Color process: Color by DeLuxe
- Production company: 20th Century Fox
- Distributed by: 20th Century Fox
- Release date: June 1, 1968
- Running time: 106 minutes
- Country: United States
- Language: English
- Budget: $4.45 million
- Box office: $12,000,000

Bandolero! is a 1968 American Western film directed by Andrew V. McLaglen and starring James Stewart, Dean Martin, Raquel Welch, George Kennedy, Andrew Prine, Will Geer, and Clint Ritchie. The story centers on two brothers on the run from a posse, led by a local sheriff who wants to arrest the runaways and free a hostage whom they took along the way. They head into the wrong territory, which is controlled by "Bandoleros".

== Plot ==
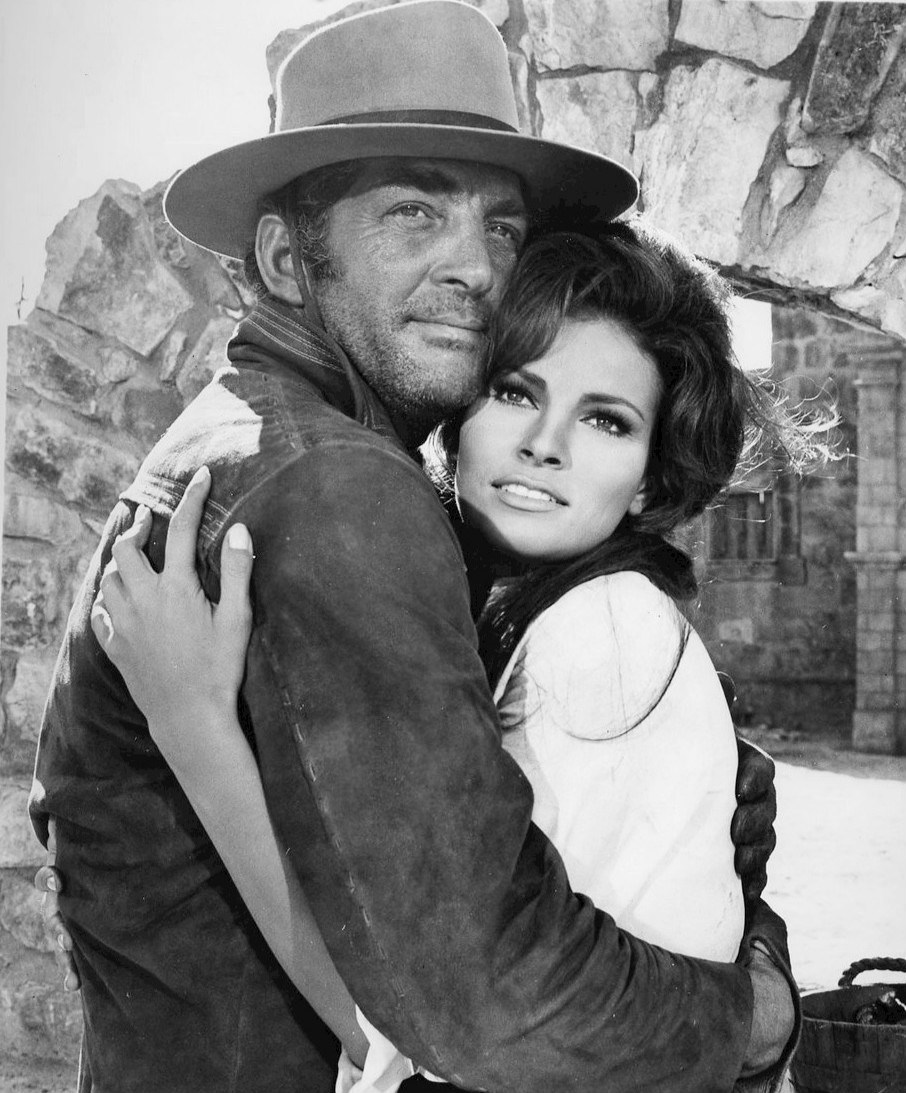
Dean Martin and Raquel Welch

A gang of robbers arrive at the Texan town of Val Verde with the intention of robbing a bank. The heist goes wrong and a shootout with the local authorities ensues. During it, gang member Babe Jenkins kills a wealthy civilian, the husband of a woman named Maria Stoner. The gang eventually gets arrested.

Staying at an inn in a neighboring town, a man named Mace Bishop meets the hangman the government sent to execute the gang and learns of what happened in Val Verde. Stealing the hangman's clothes and imitating his way of talking, Mace steals his identity and goes to Val Verde with the intention of freeing his brother Dee, the gang's leader, from the gallows. The day of the execution, he convinces sheriff July Johnson to take every attendant's gun with the excuse of having a safer event and manages to help the whole gang escape. After the gang flees with a posse in pursuit, Mace robs the bank on his own .

Dee decides to take Maria as a hostage after they come across her wagon. The posse, led by sheriff July Johnson and deputy Roscoe Bookbinder, chases the fugitives across the Mexican border into territory policed by bandoleros. According to Maria, bandoleros are men out to kill any gringos (foreigners) that they can find. Maria further warns Dee that the sheriff will follow, because they have taken the one thing that he has always wanted: her.

Despite initial protestations, Maria falls for Dee after he protects her from the others and finds herself in a quandary. She had never felt anything for the sheriff, nor for her husband, who had purchased her from her family. The posse tracks them to an abandoned town and captures the gang. The bandoleros also arrive, shooting and killing Roscoe. The sheriff releases the outlaws so that the men can fight back in defense.

In the ensuing battle, almost everyone is killed. Dee is fatally stabbed by the leader of the bandits, Angel, after Dee beats him when he attempts to rape Maria. Then, Mace is shot by another. Babe and gang member Robbie O'Hare die after killing several bandoleros. Gang member Pop Chaney is killed while going after the money Mace stole, and his son Joe dies after trying to rescue him.

Maria grabs Dee's pistol and shoots Angel dead, sending the now leaderless bandoleros into full retreat. Maria professes her love to Dee and kisses him before he dies. Mace returns the money to Sheriff Johnson, and then falls dead from his wound. Maria and the sheriff, with little left of the posse, bury the Bishop brothers and dead posse members, after which Maria remarks that no one will know who was there. They then begin the ride back to Texas.

== Cast ==
- James Stewart as Mace Bishop
- Dean Martin as Dee Bishop
- Raquel Welch as Maria Stoner
- George Kennedy as Sheriff July Johnson
- Andrew Prine as Deputy Sheriff Roscoe Bookbinder
- Will Geer as Pop Chaney
- Clint Ritchie as "Babe" Jenkins
- Denver Pyle as Muncie Carter
- Tom Heaton as Joe Chaney
- Rudy Diaz as Angel
- Sean McClory as Robbie O'Hare
- Harry Carey Jr. as Cort Hayjack (credited as Harry Carey)
- Don "Red" Barry as Jack Hawkins (credited as Donald Barry)
- Guy Raymond as Ossie Grimes
- Perry Lopez as Frisco
- Jock Mahoney as Stoner
- Dub Taylor as Attendant
- Big John Hamilton as Bank Customer
- Robert Adler as Ross Harper (credited as Bob Adler)
- John Mitchum as Bath House Customer
- Patrick Cranshaw as Bank Clerk (credited as Joseph Patrick Cranshaw)
- Roy Barcroft as The Bartender

== Production ==
Originally known as Mace, the film was shot at the Alamo Village, the movie set originally created for John Wayne's The Alamo. Parts of the film were also shot at Kanab Canyon and Glen Canyon in Utah.

Raquel Welch later said of her performance, "No one is going to shout, 'Wow it's Anne Bancroft all over again', but at least I'm not Miss Sexpot running around half naked all the time." "I think she's going to stack up all right", Stewart said of Welch.

Larry McMurtry, the author of the novel Lonesome Dove, reportedly paid homage to Bandolero! by using similar names for the characters in his book. Both tales begin near the Mexican border and involve bandoleros. Both have a sheriff named July Johnson and a deputy Roscoe who travel a great distance in search of a wanted criminal and the woman who has rejected the sheriff's love. Both stories have a charismatic outlaw named Dee, who is about to be hanged and who wins the love of the woman before he dies. In the Lonesome Dove miniseries, the main characters twice pass directly in front of the Alamo—or at least a set built to replicate the Alamo.

== Reception ==
Bandolero! earned North American rentals of $5.5 million in 1968. According to Fox records, the film required $10,200,000 in rentals to break even, and by 11 December 1970, had made $8,800,000, resulting in a loss for the studio.

On the review aggregator website Rotten Tomatoes, 20% of 5 critics' reviews are positive, with an average rating of 5.3/10. Roger Ebert awarded the film 2 out of 4 stars. He praised the performances, particularly Stewart's, but viewed the storyline as "routine".

== Soundtrack ==
Jerry Goldsmith's score was released as an LP by Project 3 Records, and years later multiple times on CD. Because of Martin's exclusive contract with Reprise Records, all traces of him were removed from the cover, even the artwork, despite the album being strictly instrumental and his voice never being heard.
