= The Gun That Won the West =

1955 film by William Castle

- Original film poster
- Directed by: William Castle
- Screenplay by: Robert E. Kent (as James B. Gordon)
- Story by: Robert E. Kent (as James B. Gordon)
- Produced by: Sam Katzman
- Starring: Dennis Morgan; Paula Raymond; Richard Denning
- Cinematography: Henry Freulich
- Edited by: Al Clark
- Color process: Technicolor
- Production company: Columbia Pictures
- Distributed by: Columbia Pictures
- Release date: September 1, 1955
- Running time: 70 minutes
- Country: United States
- Language: English

The Gun That Won the West is a 1955 American Western film directed by William Castle and starring Dennis Morgan, Paula Raymond and Richard Denning.

== Plot ==
Colonel Carrington (Roy Gordon) and his command are assigned the job of constructing a chain of forts in the Sioux Indian territory of Wyoming during the 1880s. The Colonel recruits former cavalry soldiers turned frontier scouts Jim Bridger (Dennis Morgan) and "Dakota Jack" Gaines (Richard Denning), now running a Wild West show, to head the fort building.

Bridger and Gaines are friendly with Sioux chief Red Cloud (Robert Bice) but have reservations about the chief's 2nd in command, Afraid of Horses (Michael Morgan). Both Bridger and Gaines are confident a peace treaty with the Sioux can be made. However, if war breaks out, the cavalry is depending on getting a new type of breech loading Springfield Model 1865 rifle. Gaines, Mrs. Gaines (Paula Raymond), and Bridger arrive at the fort for the conference. Gaines gets drunk and attempts to intimidate the Indians into signing a treaty. Chief Red Fox threatens war if his territory is invaded by any troops building forts.

== Cast ==
- Dennis Morgan as Jim Bridger
- Paula Raymond as Mrs. Max Gaines
- Richard Denning as 'Dakota' Jack Gaines
- Chris O'Brien as Sgt. Timothy Carnahan
- Robert Bice as Chief Red Cloud
- Michael Morgan as Afraid of Horses
- Roy Gordon as Colonel Carrington
- Howard Wright as General Pope
- Richard Travis as Lang - Rifle Demonstrator (uncredited)
- Richard H. Cutting as Edwin M. Stanton (uncredited)
- Don C. Harvey as Doctor (uncredited)

== Production ==
The film features a large amount of stock footage from Buffalo Bill.

== See also ==
- List of American films of 1955
- Colt .45
- Winchester '73
- Springfield Rifle
