= Poco... Little Dog Lost =

- Directed by: Dwight Brooks
- Written by: William E. Carville
- Produced by: Dwight Brooks
- Starring: Chill Wills; Michelle Ashburn; Sherry Bain; Clint Ritchie; John Steadman; Mikki Jamison
- Cinematography: Dwight Brooks
- Edited by: James Ballas; San Bernardo
- Distributed by: Cinema Shares International Distribution
- Release date: October 1977
- Running time: 88 minutes
- Country: United States
- Language: English

Poco... Little Dog Lost is a 1977 American independent family adventure drama film about a young girl, Kim (Michelle Ashburn), and her dog, Poco.

== Plot ==
Early in the film, both Kim and her mother are injured in a car accident. An emergency medical crew arrives to help them and bring them to the hospital. But Kim's dog, Poco, gets spooked during the commotion and runs off into the desert.

Lost in the dangerous wilds, Poco treks across the wilderness in search of Kim. As Kim recovers, she searches for Poco as well.

Poco has several adventures as he makes his way through scenic, diverse, and occasionally treacherous California terrain, from the high desert, the Sierra Nevada mountains, a ghost town, and a romp through Yosemite National Park. The dog also has several encounters along the way, including a kind old gas station owner (John Steadman) and a benevolent gold prospector (Chill Wills), as well as a few other animal friends, all of whom help Poco on his journey home.

== Cast ==
- Chill Wills as Big Burt
- Michelle Ashburn as Kim
- Muffin as Poco
- Sherry Bain as Mrs. McKinna
- Clint Ritchie as Mr. McKinna
- Ysabel MacCloskey
- John Steadman as Ben Ashton
- Dran Hamilton
- Tom Roy Lowe
- Jeanne Bates as Mrs. John Ashmore
- Robert Broyles as Deputy
- Mikki Jamison Olsen as Jane
- Jim Schlievert as Ranger
- Michael L. Harris as Hold-Up Man
- Shannon Farnon as Nurse

== Filming ==
Filming locations include Yosemite National Park; the ghost town of Bodie, California; the Mono Lake area; the Owens Valley; the sand dunes in Death Valley, California and Sacramento International Airport in Sacramento, California.

Muffin, the dog who plays the title character of Poco, also appeared in the television series CHiPs, in the Season 1, Episode 3 episode entitled "Dog Gone."
