= Valda Hansen =

American actress (1932–1993)

- Born: Valda Joanne Hansen; November 3, 1932; Los Angeles, California, U.S.
- Died: July 21, 1993 (aged 60); Hollywood, California, U.S.
- Years active: 1955–1975
- Notable work: Night of the Ghouls (1959)

Valda Joanne Hansen (November 3, 1932 – July 21, 1993) was an American actress, known for her performances in a number of B-movies in the 1950s and 1970s.

Her most famous role was that of the White Ghost in Ed Wood's Night of the Ghouls (1959). She had previously played a stripper in Strips Around the World (1955).

She returned to the screen in the 1970s and appeared in movies such as Cain's Cutthroats (1971), Slaughter's Big Rip-Off (1973) Norma (1970), The Great Northfield, Minnesota Raid (1972) and Wham! Bam! Thank You, Spaceman! (1975).

She also appeared in a 1992 documentary about the filmmaker Ed Wood entitled Flying Saucers over Hollywood: The 'Plan 9' Companion, in which she said very nice things about the famed 1950s director. Valda, who believed deeply in astrology, said she and Wood shared a psychic link: "We were on this Earth, but not of it."

== Career ==
Hansen first came across Ed Wood in 1957 at a local theater production called "Accidentally Yours". Impressed with what he saw, Wood asked her to think about a role in a short TV film he was making called "The Night the Banshee Cried", but he later put her in his 1959 film Night of the Ghouls instead. She accepted the role which was that of a ghost. He also got her to bleach her hair for the role. In 1964, Ed Wood wrote a proposed screenplay for a horror/comedy film to be called Attack of the Giant Salami, which was supposed to star Boris Karloff, Joe E. Brown and Valda Hansen, but the film was never made. Valda still remained a friend and admirer of Ed Wood for the remainder of her life, and always spoke highly of him.

She played the part of Sister Anne in the 1970 biker film, Outlaw Riders which was directed by Tony Huston, and a western called Cain's Cutthroats with Scott Brady and John Carradine. She played Mady Maguire's roommate in Norma (1970), a sexy drama co-starring Uschi Digard and Art Metrano.

In 1972, she appeared in The Great Northfield, Minnesota Raid, starring Robert Duvall and Cliff Robertson. She also appeared in the 1973 film, Slaughter's Big Rip-Off which starred Jim Brown, Ed McMahon, Don Stroud and Brock Peters.

== Later years ==
Hansen retired from acting around 1975 at age 43, and died in Hollywood on July 21, 1993, from cancer at age 60. The cancer started from a mole on her leg and spread rapidly. Due to her impoverished financial situation, she couldn't afford health insurance or the necessary medical treatments that might have saved her life.

== Filmography ==
Year	Title	Role	Notes
1955	Strips Around the World	Stripper	(as Valda)
1959	Night of the Ghouls	Sheila, the White Ghost	
1970	Cain's Cutthroats	Zelda	
1970	Norma	Roommate	
1971	Outlaw Riders	Sister Anne	
1972	The Great Northfield Minnesota Raid	Nude girl	(as Valda J. Johnson)
1973	Slaughter's Big Rip-Off	Burtoli's Blonde	(as Valda Hanson)
1975	Wham! Bam! Thank You, Spaceman!	Gloria	(credited as Zelda), (final film role)
1992	Flying Saucers Over Hollywood: The 'Plan 9' Companion	Herself	Video Documentary
