= Wild and Wooly =

- Genre: Comedy; Western
- Written by: Earl W. Wallace
- Directed by: Philip Leacock
- Starring: Chris De Lisle; Susan Bigelow; Elyssa Davalos; Doug McClure; David Doyle; Ross Martin; Charles Siebert; Sherry Bain; Vic Morrow; Paul Burke; Jessica Walter
- Music by: Charles Bernstein
- Country of origin: United States
- Original language: English

Production
- Executive producers: Douglas S. Cramer; Aaron Spelling
- Producers: E. Duke Vincent; Earl W. Wallace
- Production locations: Twentieth Century-Fox Studios, Los Angeles, California; Old Tucson - 201 S. Kinney Road, Tucson, Arizona
- Cinematography: Jack Swain
- Editors: Dennis C. Duckwall; Howard Kunin
- Running time: 104 min.
- Production company: Spelling Television

Original release
- Network: ABC
- Release: February 20, 1978

Wild and Wooly is a 1978 comedy/Western television film directed by Philip Leacock and starring Charles Siebert, David Doyle, Elyssa Davalos, Vic Morrow, and Doug McClure. The screenplay concerns four turn-of-the-century women who break out of prison to foil an Irish assassin out to kill the President of the United States.

== Cast ==
- Susan Bigelow as Liz Hannah
- Elyssa Davalos as Shiloh
- Doug McClure as Delaney Banks
- David Doyle as President Theodore Roosevelt
- Ross Martin as Otis Bergen
- Vic Morrow as Warden Willis
- Paul Burke as Tobias Singleton
- Jessica Walter as Megan
- Charles Siebert as Sean
- Sherry Bain as Jessica
- Chris De Lisle as Lacey Langtry
