= Shea's Castle =

Private residence in Los Angeles County, California

Coordinates: 34°41′51″N 118°23′40″W

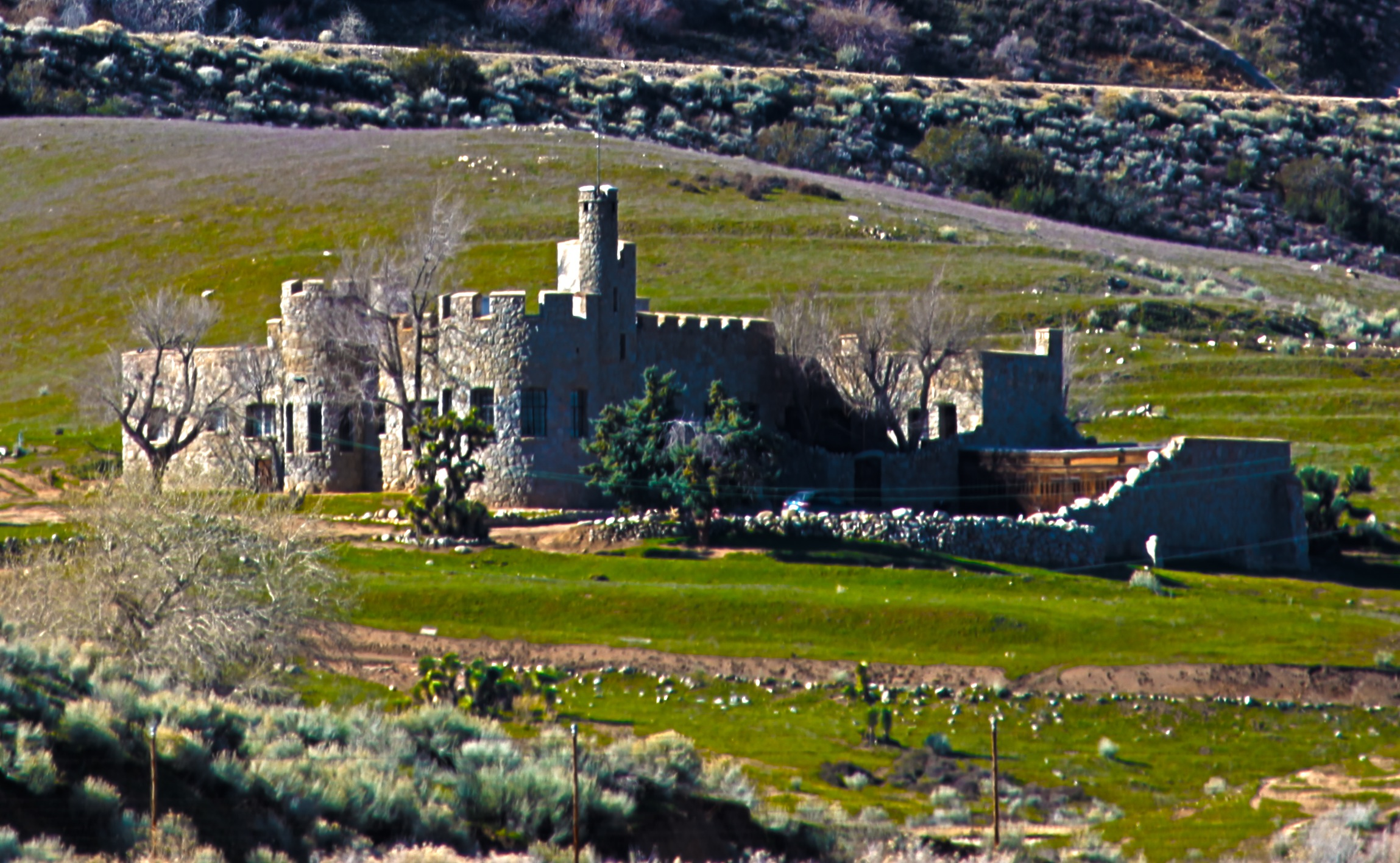
Shea's Castle

Shea’s Castle, originally dubbed "The Painted Rocks, Shea's Lodge", is known today as Sky Castle or Castle Ranch. It is a private castle built in 1924 by the developer Richard Peter Shea. Shea, a New Yorker, moved to the dry climate of Southern California, reportedly hoping to improve the health of his first wife Elizabeth. However that turned out, the couple soon divorced and Shea married his second wife Jane in 1924. Shea made his fortune developing Hancock Park in Los Angeles. He spent two years building the 8 bedroom, 7.5-bath castle, constructed of solid granite, on about 1,500 acres (6 km²) of land located in the Antelope Valley, just west of Lancaster and just south of the Antelope Valley California Poppy Reserve.

The Stock Market Crash of 1929 bankrupted Shea. The bank took over the castle, Shea's wife Jane died and Shea committed suicide in 1932.

A variety of owners and renters have occupied the castle since. Thomas Stewart Lee, heir of the California-based Don Lee Network, once lived in the home. Roy Rogers' horse Trigger was trained on the property. A non-profit aviation group added a runway, dam and lake.

The castle has seen its share of development plans as well, but to this day remains pretty much the same. There are pictographs on the property, as well as natural springs. It has been a location for 1967's Blood of Dracula's Castle, 2008's Alive or Dead, 2022's Babylon, and TV shows such as Airwolf, Bat Masterson, Buffy the Vampire Slayer (Season 5 Episode 1), Harry O, The Rat Patrol, and Starsky & Hutch.

It is currently a private residence.

== See also ==
- List of castles in the United States
