= Cain's Cutthroats =

1971 film by Ken Osborne

- Directed by: Ken Osborne
- Written by: Wilton Denmark; Ralph Luce; Ken Osborne
- Produced by: Budd Dell; Ken Osborne
- Starring: John Carradine; Scott Brady; Robert Dix; Don Epperson; Darwin Joston; Adair Jameson; Valda Hansen
- Cinematography: Ralph Waldo
- Edited by: James C. Moore
- Music by: Harley Hatcher
- Distributed by: Fanfare Films Inc.
- Release date: 1971
- Running time: 95 minutes
- Country: United States
- Language: English

Cain's Cutthroats is a 1971 western-themed exploitation film. It is a story of brutality, betrayal, and revenge set in the period immediately following the end of the American Civil War. The film was released under the alternate titles Cain's Way, The Blood Seekers, and Justice Cain. It stars John Carradine, Scott Brady, Darwin Joston, Valda Hansen, Robert Dix, Tereza Thaw, and Adair Jameson.

== Plot ==
After the end of the Civil War, Confederate army captain Justice Cain (Scott Brady) retires from the military. He becomes a farmer and lives a peaceful life with his son, Jody (by his deceased first wife) and his new wife, Angie (Tereza Thaw), the biracial ex-slave of Cain's former father-in-law.

Unbeknownst to Cain, a group of six soldiers previously under Cain's command (and known as "Cain's Cutthroats"), Ameson (Robert Dix), Billy-Joe (Darwin Joston), Tucker (Bruce Kimball), Farrette (Don Epperson), Mason, and Crawford, has recently been released from a Union prison. The former Confederate soldiers have become a roving band of homicidal highway robbers, and their ultimate goal is to re-form a squadron led by Cain and renew attacks upon Union targets.

The men find Cain and tell him of their plans, but when Cain refuses to join them, tells them that the "Old South" is dead, and derides their unrealistic plan to attack the north, they become enraged, attack him, and tie him up. Ameson, the leader of the group, rapes Angie while Cain watches helplessly. Billy-Joe, the most deranged and volatile of the men, attempts to rape her afterwards, but she fights him off. Fuming about what he perceives as Angie's sexual "rejection" of him, Billy-Joe kills her. Cain then screams insults at Billy-Joe, who shoots both Cain and Jody, killing the little boy instantly.

Realizing that Billy-Joe's uncontrollable rage has set them on the path of no return, the men attempt to cover their tracks by burning down Cain's farm, but they leave unaware that Cain is still alive.

With the help of Preacher Simms (John Carradine), a bible-quoting bounty hunter, and Rita (Adair Jameson), a former prostitute (and Tucker's ex-girlfriend), Cain systematically tracks down and kills the men. However, Cain becomes increasingly sadistic with each killing, and Simms begins to question whether Cain is more interested in achieving justice or indulging his own bloodlust. After killing most of the men, Cain finds Billy-Joe and shoots him in the crotch several times, so that he dies a slow, excruciatingly painful death. This disgusts Simms and Rita, and they abandon Cain.

Cain then sets out alone to kill Ameson, the last surviving member of the gang. However, Ameson is captured by Union soldiers and executed by firing squad before Cain can reach him. Cain, now alone in the world and robbed of the satisfaction of killing the man who raped his wife, sinks to the ground and weeps in despair.

== Cast ==
- John Carradine as Preacher Simms
- Scott Brady as Justice Cain
- Robert Dix as Amison
- Don Epperson as Farrette
- Darwin Joston as Billy Joe
- Adair Jameson as Rita
- Bruce Kimball as Tucker
- Tereza Thaw as Cain's Wife
- Valda Hansen as Zelda

== Different versions of the film ==
Two versions of this film were released. The earlier Cain's Way cut was released in 1970, and the later, better known Cain's Cutthroats version was released in 1971. The Cain's Way cut is slightly longer, because the scenes showing the Confederate gang on a rampage are interspersed with documentary footage of a modern day biker gang terrorizing people. The biker scenes were then cut from the film, and it was released in 1971 as Cain's Cutthroats, a version that has a more straightforward narrative structure than the original cut and takes place entirely in the 1860s.
