= Wayne Tippit =

American actor (1932–2009)

- Born: Gerald Wayne Tippit; December 19, 1932; Lubbock, Texas
- Died: August 28, 2009 (aged 76); Los Angeles, California
- Occupation: Character actor
- Years active: 1959–2009

Wayne Tippit (December 19, 1932 – August 28, 2009) was an American television and stage character actor. He was best known to television audiences for playing Ted Adamson on the 1970s and 1980s CBS soap opera, Search for Tomorrow, for five years. He later portrayed Palmer Woodward, the father of Heather Locklear's character, Amanda Woodward, on the Fox primetime soap opera, Melrose Place, during the 1990s.

== Early life ==
Gerald Wayne Tippit was born on December 19, 1932, in Lubbock, Texas. He initially enrolled at what is now called Texas Tech University, where he pursued drama and speech. However, Tippit transferred to the University of Iowa, where he obtained his bachelor's degree in fine arts in 1953.

Tippit enlisted in the United States Army following his graduation, where he produced a radio show. He moved to New York City after leaving the Army in order to pursue stage and theater roles.

== Career ==
Shortly after arriving in New York City in the late 1950s, Tippit appeared in small parts on Broadway in Only in America and Tall Story. Additional Broadway credits included Gantry in 1970, as well as The Nerd (directed by Charles Nelson Reilly), in 1987–88.

In 1959, Tippit was cast in the CBS soap opera, The Secret Storm, where he portrayed the character, Jerry Ames. He remained on the soap opera for six years, while simultaneously working as an advertising spokesman for several consumer products.

During that time he was also affiliated with the now defunct North Jersey Playhouse where Robert Ludlum was producer. He continued to perform in stage roles in New York City during the 1960s, 1970s and 1980s. He found acclaim in the late 1960s in a pair of off-Broadway shows, MacBird and The Boys in the Band. In MacBird, Tippit took over the title role – a character seen as a caricature of President Lyndon B. Johnson – from Stacy Keach. In The Boys in the Band, he played Hank, a married-with-children schoolteacher who shows up at a birthday party with his male lover. He took over the lead in Werner Liepolt's "The Young Master Dante" at The American Place Theater in 1968–69. In the early 1970s, Tippit played FBI agent Dan Shore in three episodes of The Rockford Files. In 1978, he was cast as Ted Adamson on the CBS daytime soap opera, Search for Tomorrow. He remained in the cast of Search for Tomorrow for five years. In the mid-1980s he appeared in Lanford Wilson's autobiographical play Lemon Sky, opposite Jeff Daniels and Jill Eikenberry.

After roles in films such as Tell Me That You Love Me, Junie Moon (1970), Pipe Dreams (1976) and Rollercoaster (1977), Tippit appeared in the 1981 film Taps as U.S. Army Master Sergeant Kevin Moreland, the father of actor Timothy Hutton's character—Cadet Major Brian Moreland. Tippit and his family were longtime residents of Ridgewood, New Jersey, but moved to Los Angeles in 1990 to pursue television roles after Tippit was diagnosed with chronic obstructive pulmonary disease. He appeared on a number of television series, mostly in guest appearances as characters on Diagnosis: Murder, L.A. Law, Seinfeld, Murphy Brown, Quantum Leap, The X-Files, Matlock and Tales from the Darkside.

During the 1990s, Tippit appeared on Melrose Place, playing Palmer Woodward, father of Heather Locklear's character, Amanda Woodward. He also appeared in The Dream Team (1989) and Madhouse (1990), and portrayed the FBI agent, Frank, in 1991's JFK.

== Death ==
Tippit received a single lung transplant in 2000 as treatment for severe emphysema. He died of respiratory failure after a long illness with multiple complications at Cedars-Sinai Medical Center in Los Angeles on August 28, 2009, at the age of 76. He was survived by his wife, Carole Macho Tippit; daughters Sarah Tippit and Kate Tippit Avron; and four grandchildren.

== Filmography ==
| Year | Title | Role | Notes |
|---|---|---|---|
| 1964 | The Horror of Party Beach | Drunk Killed by Monster | Uncredited |
| 1970 | Tell Me That You Love Me, Junie Moon | Dr. Miller | |
| 1976 | Pipe Dreams | Mike Thompson | |
| 1977 | Rollercoaster | Christie | |
| 1981 | Taps | Mst. Sgt. Kevin Moreland | |
| 1989 | The Dream Team | Captain Lewitt | |
| 1990 | Madhouse | Grindle | |
| 1990 | Running Against Time | FBI Agent Landry | |
| 1991 | JFK | FBI Agent – Frank | |
| 1996 | Dark Skies | J. Edgar Hoover | |
| 1998 | Dancer, Texas Pop. 81 | Keller's Grandfather | |
| 2000 | Nurse Betty | Doctor | |
