= Pipe Dreams (1976 film) =

1976 film by Stephen Verona

- Directed by: Stephen F. Verona
- Written by: Stephen F. Verona
- Produced by: Stephen F. Verona
- Starring: Gladys Knight; Barry Hankerson
- Cinematography: Stevan Larner
- Edited by: Robert Estrin
- Music by: Gladys Knight & the Pips
- Distributed by: AVCO Embassy Pictures
- Release date: November 1976
- Running time: 89 minutes
- Country: United States
- Language: English

Pipe Dreams is a 1976 romantic drama film starring soul singer Gladys Knight in her acting debut as a woman who attempts to regain the love of her husband, played by real-life spouse Barry Hankerson. His boss is played by Wayne Tippit; Bruce French, Sally Kirkland and Altovise Davis (wife of Sammy Davis Jr.) round out the cast.

== Plot ==
Maria Wilson follows her husband to Alaska, where he is working on the Alaska pipeline, to try to win him back. The local boss disapproves.

== Cast ==
- Gladys Knight as Maria Wilson
- Barry Hankerson as Rob Wilson
- Wayne Tippit as Mike Thompson
- Sherry Bain as Loretta
- Bruce French as "The Duke"
- Sally Kirkland as Betty "Two Street Betty"
- Altovise Davis as Lydia
- Redmond Gleeson as "Hollow Legs"
- John Mitchum as Franklin

== Production ==
The film was written and directed by Steve Verona and produced by Verona Enterprises and California Cinema Pruductions LGN, with financing from Buddah Records and minority organizations. Filming took place on location in Valdez in January 1976.

The soundtrack album for the movie was produced by Knight's brother Merald "Bubba" Knight.

== Reception ==
Box office results were poor. Gladys Knight received a Golden Globe nomination for New Star Of The Year (Actress). "So Sad the Song" from Pipe Dreams, The Original Motion Picture Soundtrack earned a Golden Globe nomination for Best Original Song (Motion Picture).

== Soundtrack ==
All tracks are performed by Gladys Knight & the Pips
No.	Title	Writer(s)	Producer(s)	Length
1.	"So Sad the Song"	Michael Masser; Gerry Goffin	M. Masser	3:49
2.	"Alaskan Pipeline"	Ivy Jo Hunter; Curke Dudley	M. "Bubba" Knight; D. Frontiere	4:40
3.	"Pot of Jazz"	Merald "Bubba" Knight; Dominic Frontiere	M. "Bubba" Knight; D. Frontiere	4:06
4.	"I'll Miss You"	James Cleveland	M. "Bubba" Knight; D. Frontiere	3:06
5.	"Nobody But You"	Barry Mann; Cynthia Weil	M. "Bubba" Knight; D. Frontiere	3:28
6.	"Pipe Dreams"	Tony Camillo	M. "Bubba" Knight; D. Frontiere	4:20
7.	"Find A Way"	Jerry Spikes; Mildred Spikes	M. "Bubba" Knight; D. Frontiere	3:50
8.	"I Will Follow My Dream"	J. Cleveland	M. "Bubba" Knight; D. Frontiere	4:10
9.	"So Sad the Song (Instrumental)"	M. Masser; G. Goffin	M. Masser	4:05
Total length:				36:34
