= The Hard Ride =

1971 film by Burt Topper

- Theatrical release poster
- Directed by: Burt Topper
- Written by: Burt Topper
- Produced by: Charles Hannawalt
- Starring: Robert Fuller; Sherry Bain; Tony Russel
- Cinematography: Robert F. Sparks
- Edited by: Kenneth G. Crane
- Music by: Harley Hatcher
- Production company: Burwalt Productions
- Distributed by: American International Pictures
- Release date: April 22, 1971
- Running time: 93 minutes
- Country: United States
- Language: English

The Hard Ride is a 1971 action film about a U.S. Marine who promises to take care of a dead friend's motorcycle and is threatened by a rival biker gang in the process. The film was written and directed by Burt Topper and stars Robert Fuller, Sherry Bain, and Tony Russel.

== Production ==
It was known during production as Bury An Angel (1970).

The soundtrack was released on the Paramount Records label (PAS 6005) the same year as the picture was released and features a mix of pop and folk rock songs, including a rendition of "Swing Low, Sweet Chariot" sung by Bill Medley. All songs were arranged or written by Harley Hatcher.

== Reception ==
Reviews were mixed. Some praised the fact that there was more depth to the film than most other biker flicks, while others have found the movie unoriginal and preachy.

== See also ==
- List of American films of 1971
- Easy Rider
- Hippie exploitation films
