= Crisis (1950 film) =

1950 film by Richard Brooks

- Theatrical release poster
- Directed by: Richard Brooks
- Screenplay by: Richard Brooks
- Story by: George Tabori
- Based on: "The Doubters" by George Tabori
- Produced by: Arthur Freed
- Starring: Cary Grant; José Ferrer; Paula Raymond; Signe Hasso; Ramon Novarro; Gilbert Roland; Leon Ames
- Cinematography: Ray June
- Edited by: Robert J. Kern
- Music by: Miklós Rózsa
- Production company: Metro-Goldwyn-Mayer
- Distributed by: Metro-Goldwyn-Mayer
- Release dates: June 29, 1950 (Washington, D.C.); July 4, 1950 (New York, Los Angeles)
- Running time: 96 minutes
- Country: United States
- Language: English
- Budget: $1,581,000
- Box office: $1,403,000

Crisis is a 1950 American film noir directed by Richard Brooks (in his directorial debut) and starring Cary Grant, José Ferrer and Paula Raymond. It follows American couple Eugene and Helen Ferguson who inadvertently become embroiled in a revolution. The film is based on the short story titled "The Doubters" by George Tabori, which was published in the magazine Today's Woman.

== Plot ==
Dr. Eugene Ferguson, a renowned American brain surgeon, and his wife Helen are vacationing in Latin America when a revolution takes place. They are taken against their will to the country's dictator, Raoul Farrago, who urgently needs a life-saving operation.

Over the next few days, while Ferguson trains assistants for the delicate operation, he witnesses various acts of brutality by the regime, especially by Colonel Adragon. Roland Gonzales, the rebel leader, kidnaps Helen to pressure her husband to intentionally botch the surgery. His message to Ferguson is intercepted by Isabel Farrago, the dictator's wife, and the operation is a success. Helen is released unharmed when Farrago dies soon afterward and his government is overthrown.

== Cast ==
- Cary Grant as Dr. Eugene Norland Ferguson
- José Ferrer as Raoul Farrago
- Paula Raymond as Helen Ferguson
- Signe Hasso as Isabel Farrago
- Ramon Novarro as Colonel Adragon
- Gilbert Roland as Roland Gonzales
- Leon Ames as Sam Proctor

== Production ==
The screenplay is based on George Tabori's short story titled "The Doubters" that appeared in the magazine Today's Woman. MGM had previously attempted to produce a film adaptation of Tabori's story "Crete", which had also been published in Today's Woman, but the project did not materialize. The studio neglected to secure rights to "The Doubters" from the magazine until just before the film's release, when the oversight was corrected. However, Today's Woman did not seek a screen credit for itself, hoping to avoid a dispute with MGM that might harm Tabori. The film's preproduction working title was Ferguson.

The year before, Richard Brooks had been lured away from Warner Bros. by MGM producer Arthur Freed to write the screenplay for his unit's Clark Gable film, Any Number Can Play, with the understanding that he would soon be able to direct as well as write pictures for the studio. Crisis was his first opportunity and he embarked on it after an extensive research trip to Colombia and several Central American countries.

Inspired by the film's Latin American setting, Brooks and Freed decided to cast three of MGM's former, Silent Era "Latin-Lover" stars in support of Grant: Antonio Moreno, Ramon Novarro, and Gilbert Roland.

Actress and future first lady Nancy Davis tested for the lead female role Helen Ferguson that was ultimately awarded to Paula Raymond in December 1949. MGM hoped to use Crisis as a vehicle to launch Raymond, whom they viewed as the next Norma Shearer, to stardom.

Cary Grant viewed the dramatic role of Dr. Eugene Ferguson, his first in several years, as the greatest challenge of his career to that point. It was his first film for MGM since The Philadelphia Story in 1940.

Production began in early January 1950.

== Reception ==
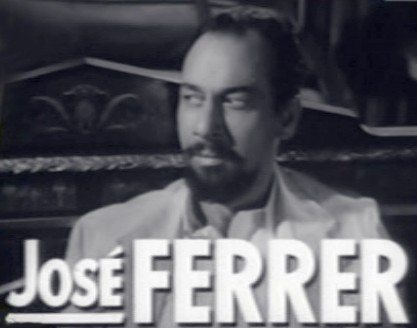
From the trailer

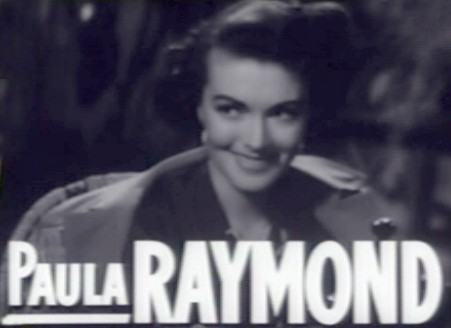
From the trailer

Crisis opened on June 29, 1950 in Washington, D.C.

In a contemporary review for The New York Times, critic Bosley Crowther wrote:

Produced with less generous indulgence of acting and technical skill, this obviously fantastic fiction would probably be laughed off the screen, assuming it got any further than an action-house double-bill. For it is such a pulp-magazine story in every perceptible way—in plot, in incident, in spirit and even in the sentiments phrased—that it might better have made a fast adventure of a "quickie" hero in some fanciful wilds. ... With such a penny-dreadful story, it is remarkable that Mr. Brooks has been able to get any substance of even passing consequences on the screen. But some of his film is quite amusing and the two main performances are good. ... However, the task of surmounting the story completely and in full is beyond Mr. Brooks and his barely adequate supporting cast. ... The operation is successful, but the picture, we're afraid, will die.

Critic Edwin Schallert of the Los Angeles Times wrote: "Crisis suffers from being stylized. It doesn't move with the anticipated swiftness at the outset. Furthermore it runs wild and then falls flat at the actual close. These technical faults are likely to prove a drawback to the popular appreciation which such a unique subject might deserve." Some contemporary reviews criticized the film as pro-American propaganda. Variety noted: "The script (from a story by George Tabori) and direction by Richard Brooks lets it get up on the soapbox too frequently." Kate Cameron's scathing assessment in the New York Daily News was especially harsh:

When Hollywood tries to project propaganda line on the screen, its big brains are apt to work in anything but a subtle manner. ... With our State Department having labored for years to set what is known as the Good Neighbor policy between the U.S. and the countries to the south of us, Hollywood, by means of this Metro-Goldwyn-Mayer picture, tries to abolish that policy in one fell swoop. By failing to name the country in which the action of Crisis is supposed to take place, the film indicts all of Latin-America. Although the country is nameless, it is more or less identified by the fact that its president, Raoul Farrago, is an absolute dictator, and that his wife, Isabel, beautiful and ambitious, has great power. ... Crisis might have been an exciting and suspenseful adventure film, if its makers were not so intent on charting the course of one particular head of a Latin-American state.

According to MGM records, the film earned $891,000 domestically and $512,000 foreign, resulting in a loss to the studio of $72,000.
