= The Devil and LeRoy Bassett =

- Directed by: Robert E. Pearson
- Starring: John F. Goff; George Buck Flower; Don Epperson
- Music by: Les Baxter
- Distributed by: Paramount Pictures
- Release date: 1973
- Running time: 85 minutes
- Country: United States
- Language: English

The Devil and LeRoy Bassett is a 1973 modern-day western adventure. The story follows a jailbreak that leads to the fugitives taking a church bus while trying to keep ahead of the law. The film was directed by Robert E. Pearson and starred Don Epperson.

The world premiere of the film was held in the hometown of the director at the Brown Grand Theatre in Concordia, Kansas. It was the last film shown at the Brown Grand before its historic restoration.
