= John Steadman (actor) =

American actor (1909–1993)

- Born: July 20, 1909; Greenville, South Carolina, United States
- Died: January 28, 1993 (aged 83); Montrose, California, United States
- Occupation(s): Actor, radio personality, editor
- Years active: 1970–1987

John Steadman (July 20, 1909 – January 28, 1993) was an American actor, radio personality and editor.

== Early life ==
Steadman was born in Greenville, South Carolina.

== Career ==
Steadman was a former radio personality who became a character actor when he retired after 30 years in radio. He began his acting career in 1970 and his last role was in 1987, both on television where he appeared many times. He also appeared in film where he usually had bit parts. He is probably best remembered as "Pop" in The Longest Yard (1974) with Burt Reynolds and directed by Robert Aldrich. He appeared with Reynolds in White Lightning (1973) as "Skeeter" and in Gator (1976) as "Ned McKlusky", "Gator's" father (that role played by Dabbs Greer in White Lightning). He also appeared in Emperor of the North (1973) and The Frisco Kid (1979), both directed by Aldrich.

In addition to acting, John was a DOD employee. He worked at the Armed Forces Radio and Television Service Broadcast Center in Hollywood as a film editor.

He appeared in the cult horror film The Hills Have Eyes (1977) as Fred, the gas station owner and father of Papa Jupiter. His other film credits included appearances in Dirty O'Neil (1974), St. Ives (1976), Vigilante Force (1976), Poco... Little Dog Lost (1977), The Choirboys (1977), Fade to Black (1980), Chu Chu and the Philly Flash (1981) and Dark Night of the Scarecrow (1981). He also had roles in two Cheech and Chong movies, Cheech & Chong's Next Movie (1980) and Things Are Tough All Over (1982).

== Partial filmography ==
- The Grissom Gang (1971) - Oldman
- Bedknobs and Broomsticks (1971) - Home Guard (uncredited)
- Deadhead Miles (1972) - Old Sam (uncredited)
- Unholy Rollers (1972) - Guard
- Emperor of the North (1973) - Stew Bum
- White Lightning (1973) - Skeeter
- The Outfit (1973) - Dave - Gas Station Attendant
- Dirty O'Neil (1974) - Old Bill
- The Longest Yard (1974) - Pop
- Family Plot (1976) - Old Man in Cemetery (uncredited)
- Treasure of Matecumbe (1976) - Guide
- St. Ives (1976) - Willie
- Gator (1976) - Ned McKlusky
- Vigilante Force (1976) - Shakey Malone
- The Hills Have Eyes (1977) - Fred
- Poco... Little Dog Lost (1977) - Ben Ashton
- The Choirboys (1977) - Odello
- Hot Lead and Cold Feet (1978) - Old Codger
- Hanging on a Star (1978) - Crash Schwartz
- The Frisco Kid (1979) - Booking Agent
- The Waltons (1979) - Joe Bascomb
- Cheech & Chong's Next Movie (1980) - High Laughing Guy in Welfare Office
- Fade to Black (1980) - Sam
- Chu Chu and the Philly Flash (1981) - Snyder
- Dark Night of the Scarecrow (1981, TV Movie) - Mr. Loomis
- Things Are Tough All Over (1982) - Old Timer
- Young Doctors in Love (1982) - The Patients - 82 Year Old Man
- Foxfire Light (1982) - Jesse
- Chattanooga Choo Choo (1984) - Norman
