= Paula Raymond =

American actress (1924-2003)

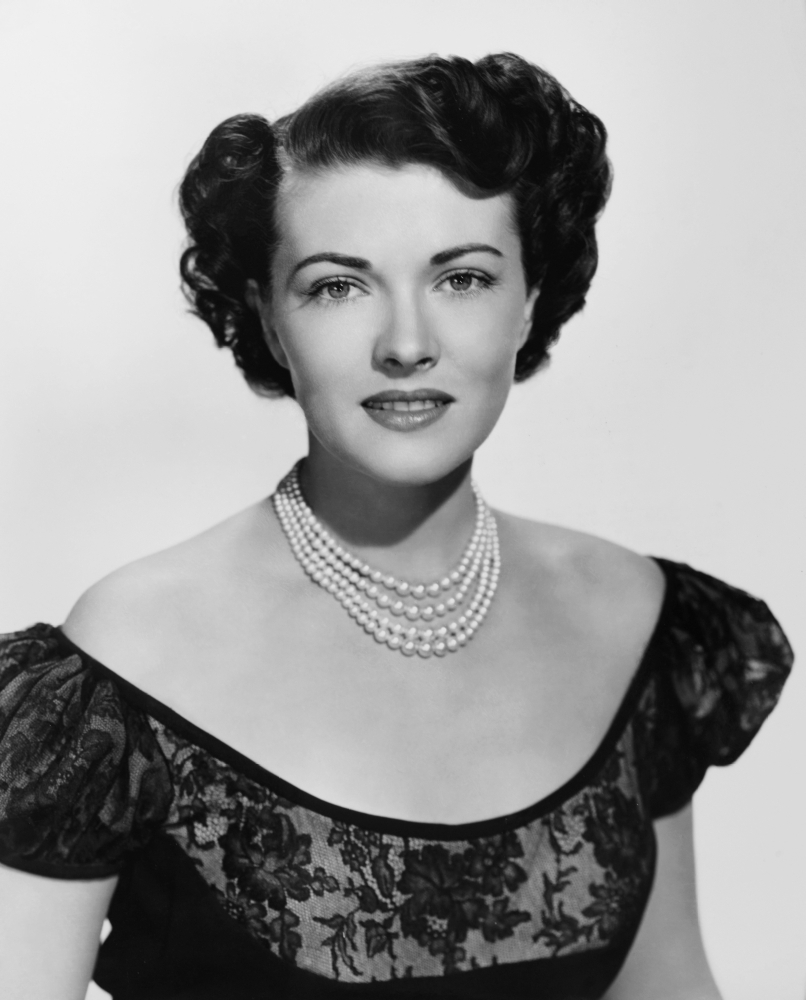
- Raymond in 1950
- Born: Paula Ramona Wright; November 23, 1924; San Francisco, California, U.S.
- Died: December 31, 2003 (aged 79); West Hollywood, California, U.S.
- Other names: Paula Rae Wright; Rae Patterson
- Years active: 1938–1994
- Spouse(s): Floyd Leroy Patterson (1944–1946) (divorced) 1 child H. Leslie Williams (1965-1966)
- Children: 1

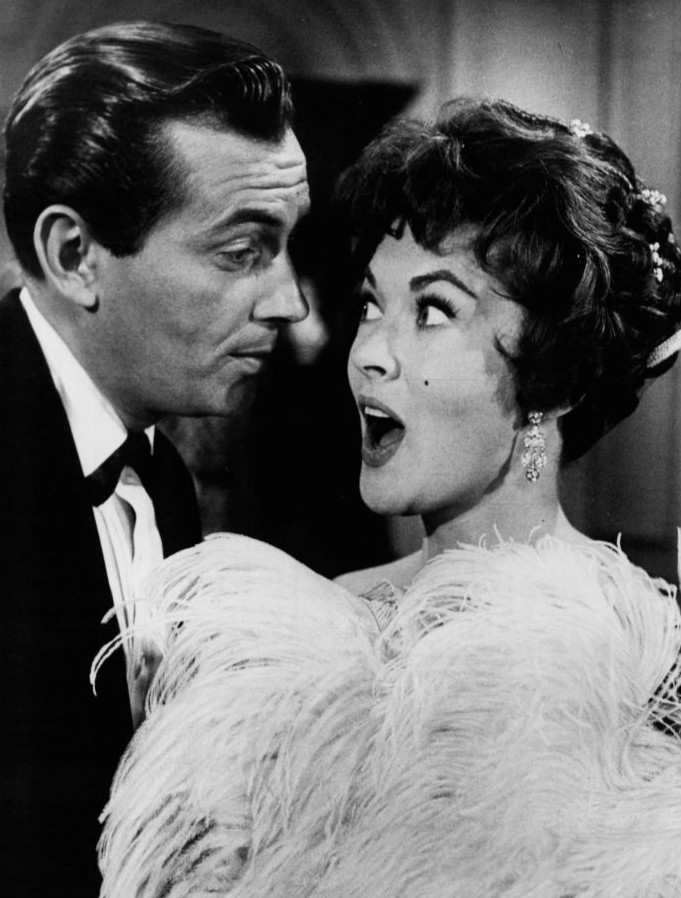
Jack Kelly and Raymond in Maverick (1961)

Paula Raymond (born Paula Ramona Wright; November 23, 1924 – December 31, 2003) was an American model and actress who played the leading lady in numerous films and television series, including Crisis (1950) with Cary Grant. She was the niece of American pulp-magazine editor Farnsworth Wright.

== Early years ==
Raymond was born on November 23, 1924, as Paula Ramona Wright in San Francisco, California. Her father was a corporate lawyer. She attended St. Brigid School. Following her parents' divorce, Raymond and her mother moved to Los Angeles.

As a child, Raymond studied ballet, piano and singing. She was a member of both the San Francisco Opera Company and the San Francisco Children's Opera Company. She graduated from Hollywood High School in 1942. Following graduation, she returned to San Francisco to attend college and worked with two theater companies there.

== Modeling ==
Before she became an actress, Raymond was a model. She told author Leo Verswijver: "I got started modeling at $25 an hour and [I] forgot all about acting, because I was earning a living." Her work included posing for the cover of True Confessions magazine.

== Film ==
Raymond's first acting role was as Bettina Bowman in Keep Smiling (1938), in which she was credited as Paula Rae Wright. In 1950, she signed a contract with MGM, where she played opposite leading men such as Cary Grant and Dick Powell. Early in her career, Raymond acted in film noir thrillers such as the cult classic City That Never Sleeps, and later in her career, she acted in horror films including Blood of Dracula's Castle.

In 1950, Raymond played Cary Grant's leading lady in Crisis. MGM hoped to use the film to launch Raymond, whom they viewed as the next Norma Shearer, to stardom. The New York Times review, however, called her work in the film "utterly feeble."

In 1952, she costarred in The Beast from 20,000 Fathoms. In 1954, she starred as Queen Berengaria in King Richard and the Crusaders. She also starred in the 1955 Western The Gun That Won the West.

Raymond also used the screen name of Rae Patterson while working for Paramount Pictures.

== Television ==
In the late 1950s and 1960s, Raymond appeared in many television shows including Perry Mason (five episodes), Maverick, Hawaiian Eye (five episodes), M Squad (three episodes) with Lee Marvin, 77 Sunset Strip (four episodes), as Martha Harrington in Peter Gunn season 1, episode 11, in 1958. She turned down the role of saloon keeper Kitty Russell in the long-running western classic series Gunsmoke and the role went instead to Amanda Blake. She said, "I didn't want to play a woman who worked in a saloon, week after week. I have a freckle on my face, and I sometimes put a beauty mark over it. They even put it on Amanda Blake, who finally got the part—although it was put on the opposite side from mine. I wanted them to soften the character but didn't think they'd do it. As it turned out, the character wasn't a trashy woman at all. She was just the type I would have liked to have played."

Raymond appeared in a 1959 episode "The Paymaster" of the ABC/Desilu western series The Life and Legend of Wyatt Earp. In Have Gun - Will Travel, "Lady with a Gun", season 3, episode 30, she played Eve McIntosh, a woman seeking revenge for her brother's killing. In 1960, she appeared in two episodes of Bat Masterson, once as Angie in "Last of the Night Raiders" and as Linda Wells in "Mr. Fourpaws". In 1961, she also played opposite Jack Kelly as Bart Maverick in an episode from the final season of the Western comedy television series Maverick titled "The Golden Fleecing".

She also appeared in the third episode of the first season, initially broadcast on February 3, 1959, in the science fiction series Alcoa Presents: One Step Beyond titled "Emergency Only", which also memorably featured Jocelyn Brando as a screaming fortune teller at a party.

In 1962, she portrayed the role of Franny Wells in the episode "House of the Hunter" on Rawhide.

== Personal life ==
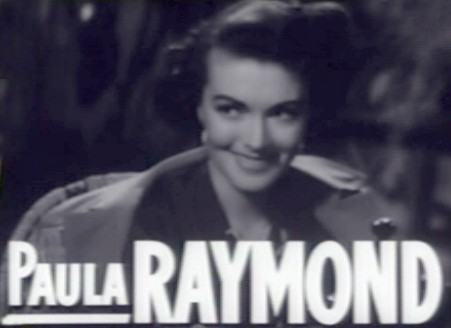
Trailer for Crisis (1950)

Raymond bore a strong physical resemblance to actress Myrna Loy. In 1950, Raymond said: "I've been hearing it ever since I was 10 years old."

In 1962, Raymond was a passenger in a car that crashed into a tree on Sunset Boulevard. Her nose was severed by the rearview mirror. After more than a year of extensive plastic surgery and recovery, she returned to acting. In 1977, while working on the soap opera Days of Our Lives, after only three appearances, she accidentally tripped on a telephone cord and broke her ankle, and her character was removed from the show. In 1984, she broke both hips, and in 1994, she broke her shoulder.

In 1944, Raymond married Floyd Leroy Patterson. In 1946, they divorced shortly after the birth of their daughter, Raeme Dorene Patterson. In 1993, Raymond's daughter died.

== Death ==
On December 31, 2003, Raymond died at Cedars-Sinai Medical Center in Los Angeles from a series of respiratory ailments. She was 79. She is interred at Holy Cross Cemetery in Culver City, California.

== Partial filmography ==
- Keep Smiling (1938) - Bettina Bowman
- Variety Girl (1947) - Variety Girl (uncredited)
- Night Has a Thousand Eyes (1948) - Companion (uncredited)
- Rusty Leads the Way (1948) - Louise Adams
- Sealed Verdict (1948) - WAC guard for Erika
- Racing Luck (1948) - Natalie Gunther
- Blondie's Secret (1948) - Dr. Mason's Nurse (uncredited)
- Challenge of the Range (1949) - Judy Barton
- Adam's Rib (1949) - Emerald - Kip's Girlfriend (uncredited)
- Holiday Affair (1949) - Girl at Drinking Fountain (uncredited)
- East Side, West Side (1949) - Joan Peterson - Bourne's Secretary (uncredited)
- Crisis (1950) - Helen Ferguson
- Duchess of Idaho (1950) - Ellen Hallet
- Devil's Doorway (1950) - Orrie Masters
- Grounds for Marriage (1951) - Agnes Oglethorpe Young
- Inside Straight (1951) - Zoe Carnot
- The Tall Target (1951) - Ginny Beaufort
- Texas Carnival (1951) - Marilla Sabinas
- The Sellout (1952) - Peggy Stauton
- The Bandits of Corsica (1953) - Christina
- The Story of Three Loves (1953) - Mrs. Campbell (segment "Mademoiselle") (uncredited)
- City That Never Sleeps (1953) - Kathy Kelly
- The Beast from 20,000 Fathoms (1953) - Lee Hunter
- King Richard and the Crusaders (1954) - Queen Berengaria
- The Human Jungle (1954) - Pat Danforth
- The Gun That Won the West (1955) - Mrs. Maxine Gaines
- The Flight That Disappeared (1961) - Marcia Paxton
- The Law and Mr. Jones (1961) TV series - Carla Hayes - ep."The Concert"
- Hand of Death (1962) - Carol Wilson
- Blood of Dracula's Castle (1969) - Countess Townsend
- Five Bloody Graves (1969) - Kansas Kelly
- Mind Twister (1993) - Agnes

== Bibliography ==
- Parla, Paul; Charles P. Mitchell (2000). "Paula Raymond: Pursuing the Beast from 20,000 Fathoms". Screen Sirens Scream! Interviews with 20 Actresses from Science Fiction, Horror, Film Noir and Mystery Movies, 1930s to 1960s. Jefferson, N.C. and London: McFarland. pp. 197–121. ISBN 0-7864-0701-8.
