= Clint Ritchie =

American actor (1938–2009)

- Born: Clinton Charles Augustus Richie; August 9, 1938; Grafton, North Dakota, U.S.
- Died: January 31, 2009 (aged 70); Roseville, California, U.S.
- Occupation: Actor
- Years active: 1950s–2004

Clinton Charles Augustus Ritchie (August 9, 1938 – January 31, 2009) was an American actor.

== Early life ==
Ritchie was born on a farm near Grafton, North Dakota, to J. C. and Charlotte Ritchie, and his family moved to Washington state when he was seven. Voted "Handsome Harry" by his classmates at Sunnyside High School, he moved to California at the age of 16 where he had a variety of jobs: truck driver, service station attendant, furniture factory worker, bartender (before his age of 19 was found out) and health club manager, before becoming an actor.

== Career ==
Ritchie is best known for his acting role as Clint Buchanan, husband of heroine Victoria Lord (played by Erika Slezak) on the ABC soap opera, One Life to Live. He originated the character in 1979 and portrayed the role through 1998, with recurring stints in 1999, 2003, and 2004.

He was under contract at 20th Century Fox with Tom Selleck and is credited with teaching Selleck how to ride a horse.

He co-starred and guest starred in numerous television Westerns during the 1950s and 1960s, including the 1965 pilot for the long-running Wild, Wild West. He also appeared in the TV series Batman as well as in many films, including First to Fight (1967), The St. Valentine's Day Massacre (1967), Bandolero! (1968), Patton (1970), Joe Kidd (1972), Against a Crooked Sky (1975), Midway (1976), Poco... Little Dog Lost (1977) and A Force of One (1979). In Patton, he portrayed a wounded tank commander who briefs Patton on a fierce night battle. His television movie roles included The Bastard, Centennial and Desperate Women. Later, he appeared on Roseanne as Clint Buchanan, with his One Life to Live costars Robert S. Woods and John Loprieno.

Ritchie was critically injured at his California ranch on May 10, 1993, when his John Deere tractor upended, knocked him to the ground, and rolled over him. Quoted as saying that he could hear his own ribs cracking, he survived and returned to the One Life to Live set after recuperating. In the interim, his costar Slezak fought not to have his role recast with another actor. Clint was written off temporarily as having been in an airplane crash while Ritchie recuperated.

== Filmography ==
=== Film ===
| Year | Title | Role | Notes |
|---|---|---|---|
| 1966 | Alvarez Kelly | Union Lieutenant | |
| 1967 | First to Fight | Sgt. Slater | |
| 1967 | The Reluctant Astronaut | Officer | Uncredited |
| 1967 | The St. Valentine's Day Massacre | Jack McGurn | |
| 1968 | Bandolero! | Babe Jenkins | |
| 1970 | Patton | Tank Captain | |
| 1971 | The Peace Killers | Rebel | |
| 1972 | Joe Kidd | Calvin | |
| 1975 | Against a Crooked Sky | John Sutter | |
| 1976 | Midway | Lt. Cmdr. Charles Fenton | Uncredited |
| 1976 | Treasure of Matecumbe | Flatboat Leader | |
| 1977 | Poco... Little Dog Lost | Mr. McKinna | |
| 1979 | A Force of One | Melrose | |

=== Television ===
| Year | Title | Role | Notes |
|---|---|---|---|
| 1965-1966 | The Wild Wild West | The Lieutenant | Episode: "The Night of the Inferno" (1965) |
| 1965-1966 | The Wild Wild West | First Bandit | Episode: "The Night of the Two-Legged Buffalo" (1966) |
| 1966-1967 | The Felony Squad | Hagen | Episode: "Between Two Fires" (1966) |
| 1966-1967 | The Felony Squad | Eddie | Episode: "The Deadly Junkman" (1967) |
| 1967 | Batman | Boff | Episode: "The Joker's Last Laugh" |
| 1967 | Batman | Boff | Episode: "The Joker's Epitaph" |
| 1969 | Daniel Boone | Two Feathers | Episode: "Three Score and Ten" |
| 1969 | Land of the Giants | Andros | Episode: "Land of the Lost" |
| 1969 | Bracken's World | Sam Borden | Episode: "The Chase Sequence" |
| 1970 | The High Chaparral | Kansas | Episode: "Spokes" |
| 1970 | The Cliff | Unknown role | Television movie (ABC) |
| 1971 | The New Dick Van Dyke Show | Cyclist #1 | Episode: "Queasy Rider" |
| 1971-1972 | Marcus Welby, M.D. | First wrangler | Episode: "Another Buckle for Wesley Hill" (1971) |
| 1971-1972 | Marcus Welby, M.D. | Tom Davis | Episode: "Jason Be Nimble, Jason Be Quick" (1972) |
| 1972 | The Bravos | Corporal Love | Television movie (ABC) |
| 1972 | Circle of Fear a/k/a Ghost Story | Second Cowboy | Episode: "Cry of the Cat" |
| 1973 | Chase | Mitch | Episode: "One for You, Two for Me" |
| 1974-1975 | Police Story | Detective Franklin | Episode: "Fingerprint" (1974) |
| 1974-1975 | Police Story | Stevens | Episode: "To Steal a Million" (1975) |
| 1975 | Lucas Tanner | Clifford Hailey | Episode: "Collision" |
| 1975 | Ellery Queen | Cop walking dog (uncredited role) | Episode: "Too Many Suspects" |
| 1975 | The Family Holvak | Deke | Episode: "First Love: Part 2" |
| 1975 | Three for the Road | Unknown role | Episode: "The Cave" |
| 1977 | Thunder | Bill Prescott | Series regular (12 episodes) |
| 1977 | Switch | Stinch | Episode: "Lady of the Deep" |
| 1978 | The Bastard | Mister Dawes | Television 2-part miniseries (shown on Operation Prime Time) |
| 1978 | Fantasy Island | Crewman | Episode: "The Big Dipper/The Pirate" |
| 1978 | Desperate Women | Unknown role | Television movie (NBC) |
| 1978-1979 | Centennial | Messmore Garrett (4 episodes) | Television 12-part miniseries (NBC) Episode: "The Shepherds" (1978); Episode: "The Storm" (1979); Episode: "The Crime" (1979); Episode: "The Winds of Fortune" (1979) |
| 1979 | Dallas | Bud Morgan | Episode: "The Outsiders" |
| 1979–1999; 2003-2004 | One Life to Live | Clinton James "Clint" Buchanan #1 | Daytime serial (contract role @ 562 episodes) |
| 1994 | Roseanne | Clinton James "Clint" Buchanan #1 | Episode: "Isn't It Romantic?" |

== Later life ==
Ritchie retired in December 1998, and said that he believed the character of Clint had been damaged during the 1992 Viki-Clint-Sloan Carpenter love triangle story. He lived at his 60-acre (240,000 m^{2}) California ranch, with his numerous dogs and cats, and 43 horses. He purchased the ranch, named the Happy Horse Ranch, in 1980 largely due to its location near Grass Valley, which is located near the site of the annual Tevis Cup 100-mile endurance horse race. His character on One Life to Live had a ranch in Arizona with the same name, and several of Ritchie's horses had been used on the show.

== Death ==
In late January 2009, Ritchie had surgery to implant a pacemaker. Although the surgery was a success, a blood clot traveled to his brain, resulting in a massive stroke. He died a few days later about 4:00 a.m. on January 31, 2009, aged 70. His friend and costar Phil Carey, who played his father Asa Buchanan on One Life to Live, died of lung cancer six days after Ritchie's death. Ritchie was cremated.
