= Forty Guns =

1957 film by Samuel Fuller

- film poster by Jock Hinchliffe
- Directed by: Samuel Fuller
- Written by: Samuel Fuller
- Produced by: Samuel Fuller
- Starring: Barbara Stanwyck; Barry Sullivan; Gene Barry
- Cinematography: Joseph F. Biroc
- Edited by: Gene Fowler Jr.
- Music by: Harry Sukman
- Color process: Black and white
- Production company: Globe Enterprises
- Distributed by: 20th Century Fox
- Release date: September 10, 1957
- Running time: 80 minutes
- Country: United States
- Language: English
- Budget: $300,000

Forty Guns is a 1957 American Western film starring Barbara Stanwyck, Barry Sullivan and Gene Barry. Written and directed by Samuel Fuller, the independent black-and-white picture was filmed in CinemaScope and released by 20th Century Fox.

== Plot ==
In the 1880s, Griff Bonnell, and his brothers, Wes and Chico, arrive in the town of Tombstone in Cochise County, Arizona. Griff is a reformed gunslinger, now working for the Attorney General's office, looking to arrest Howard Swain for mail robbery.

Swain is one of landowner Jessica Drummond's forty hired guns. She runs the territory with an iron fist, allowing the town to be terrorized and trashed by her brother, Brockie Drummond, and his boys. Brockie is an arrogant drunk and bully, but he goes too far by fatally wounding vision-impaired town Marshal Chisolm. Brockie and his drunken friends then start trashing the town.

Griff intervenes and pistol-whips Brockie with a single blow while Wes covers him with a rifle from the gunsmith shop. Trying to avoid unnecessary killing, Griff makes it a point not to crack Brockie's skull. Jessica delivered Brockie when their mother gave birth for the last time.

Wes falls in love with Louvenia Spanger, the daughter of the town gunsmith, so he decides to settle down and become the town's marshal. Griff becomes romantically involved with Jessica after she is dragged by a horse during a tornado.

Two of Jessica's forty dragoons, Logan and Savage, attempt to ambush Griff in an alley. He is saved by youngest brother Chico, who was supposed to be leaving for California for a new life on a farm. Chico's shot kills Savage, after which Jessica's brother and hired guns try to turn the town against the Bonnell brothers.

On his wedding day, Wes is gunned down by Brockie, who misses Griff when he leans forward to kiss the bride. Brockie is jailed for the murder. Jessica spends every dime she has and pulls every string she can to save him, but he is sentenced to hang.

While she accepts his fate, he tries to escape by using her as a shield, daring Griff to shoot, and is shocked when Griff does so. Griff's expertly-placed bullet merely wounds Jessica, and the cowardly Brockie then becomes the first man Griff has had to kill in ten years.

Chico remains behind to take the marshal's job. Griff departs for California, certain that Jessica hates him for killing her brother, but she runs after his buckboard calling his name. They ride off together.

== Cast ==
- Barbara Stanwyck as Jessica Drummond
- Barry Sullivan as Griff Bonnell
- Gene Barry as Wes Bonnell
- Robert Dix as Chico Bonnell
- Dean Jagger as Sherriff Ned Logan
- John Ericson as Brockie Drummond
- Hank Worden as Marshal John Chisholm
- Jidge Carroll as Barney Cashman
- Paul Dubov as Judge Macy
- Gerald Milton as Shotgun Spanger
- Ziva Rodann as Rio
- Neyle Morrow as Wiley
- Chuck Roberson as Howard Swain
- Chuck Hayward as Charlie Savage
- Sandy Wirth as Chico's Girlfriend
- Eve Brent as Louvenia Spanger

== Production ==
During pre-production the title of the film was Woman With A Whip. Fuller uses every opportunity to show off the widescreen format while employing extensive use of close-ups and one of the longest tracking shots ever done at Fox's studio at that time – over five minutes long.

Harry Sukman composed and conducted the score. Jidge Carroll sings two songs onscreen in the film, the theme song titled "High Ridin' Woman," written by Harold Adamson and Harry Sukman; and "God Has His Arms Around Me," written by Victor Young and Harold Adamson. Both songs were later recorded by the western singing group, The Sons of the Pioneers, and released on their single for RCA (RCA 47-7079) on November 1, 1957.

Fuller later repeatedly claimed that the ending he wanted involved Griff killing Jessica to get Brockie and the studio overruled him. The available script copies, written by Fuller, have the same ending as the film.

== Reception and legacy ==
The film has received critical acclaim from modern day critics. Rotten Tomatoes gives a score of 86% based on 21 reviews, with an average score of 7.9/10.

Jonathan Rosenbaum hailed it in 2007 as "probably the best and craziest" of Fuller's westerns, "the feature that fully announces his talent as an avant-garde filmmaker, even in this unlikeliest of genres...if you've ever wondered why Godard and other French New Wave directors deify Fuller, this movie explains it all." Richard Brody also championed the film, writing that "Fuller's hardboiled 1957 Western serves up doomed love and sudden death with dramatic richness...in Fuller's progressive view, the closing frontier made the hired gun obsolete. Despite the poetic bursts of violence in Fuller's signature shock images, the hero knows that the land will soon belong to the sedate townsfolk on whose behalf he honorably plies his loathsome trade."

== See also ==
- List of American films of 1957
