= Eat My Dust =

1996 video game

- Developer(s): Davidson & Associates, Inc., Funnybone Interactive, and Van Duyne Engineering
- Publisher(s): Sierra On-Line
- Platform(s): Windows
- Release: 1996
- Genre(s): Racing
- Mode(s): Single-player, multiplayer

Eat My Dust is a racing video game developed by Davidson & Associates, Inc., Funnybone Interactive, and Van Duyne Engineering. It was published by Sierra On-Line on Windows in 1996.

== Critical reception ==
The game received mixed reviews.

Gamer's Zone rated the game 3 out of 5, writing "To sum up, this is a nice little offering. The four different racecourses, as well as the internet competition option, promise anyone aged eight and up a lot of entertainment." Electric Playground rated the game 3 out of 10, concluding its review by saying "And to top it all off, the whole game is just not very much fun. I know these companies can produce better stuff, I've seen it".

A 1997 Games Domain review said "Eat My Dust offers nothing new to the racing genre. The graphics and the gaqmeplay [sic] have all been done before, and been bettered. Sierra have obviously aimed Eat My Dust for a younger audience, and due to the limited gameplay, this is the only audience I can recommend this to." But even that younger audience is well advised to stick with Mario Kart on the console systems rather than play this inferior copy-cat." Home of the Underdogs noted "One of the most little-known games published by Sierra, Eat My Dust by Funnybone Interactive is a decent racing game for kids that in many ways merits its obscurity."
