= Wild Wheels =

1991 video game

- Developer: Red Rat Software
- Publisher: Ocean Software
- Release: 1991

Wild Wheels is a 1991 video game published by Ocean Software.

== Gameplay ==
Wild Wheels is a game in which two teams of five cars equipped for arena combat play a sport that involves moving a huge metal ball into an opponent's goal to score.

== Reception ==
Reception

Review scores
Publication	Score
ACE	738
Aktueller Software Markt	6/12
Amiga Action	69%
Amiga Format	41%
Amiga Power	52%

Alan Emrich reviewed the game for Computer Gaming World, and stated that "Wild Wheels is a great arcade game with all of the pulse-pounding, joystick-jiggling, wrist-wrecking game play that a good 'computer sport' can generate."

Brian Nesbitt for The One for ST Games would have liked more options for playing the sport, but concluded that "Wild Wheels isn't going to keep anyone glued to the screen for hours on end, but it is going to bring them back again and again for short blasts."

Amiga Action felt that the game was not addictive and could not recommend it, but found the presentation to be average.

CU Amiga liked the hybrid of car and football genres, but found its gameplay repetitive.

Stuart Campbell for Amiga Power was disappointed and complained that "Mediocrity is an improvement on outright crapness, but it's still nothing to fork out hard-earned (or even not-very-hard-earned) money for."

Amiga Format found the gameplay lacking and the challenge minimal.

David Upchurch for ACE felt that players would keep interest in the game to find out about the features on the more expensive vehicles, but that "while these help, they still don't compensate for the lack of real skill or subtlety needed to succeed".

== Reviews ==
- ASM (Aktueller Software Markt) - Dec, 1991
