= Don Epperson =

American singer

- Born: 23 January 1938; Louisville, Kentucky, USA
- Died: 17 March 1973 (aged 35) Cottonwood, Arizona, USA
- Genres: Country music
- Occupations: Singer, actor
- Labels: Sidewalk, RCA Victor, Amaret

Don Epperson (born January 1938 - died 1973 in Arizona) was an American singer and actor. His daughter, Brenda Epperson is most well known for portraying Ashley Abbott on The Young and the Restless.

== Background ==
During Epperson's career, he was produced by Harley Hatcher of Sidewalk Productions, who also produced artists such as Jerry Naylor for Columbia, Max Frost and The Troopers for Tower, Saturday Revue for RCA, and Doug Brooks for Imperial.

== Film career ==
Epperson played the lead role of Reb in the 1969 film Wild Wheels which was about some dune-buggy-riding folks who take on a motorcycle gang. In the film, Reb loses his girlfriend to Knife, the leader of the bike gang. It was reported in the 5 July 1969 issue of Billboard that with Epperson having recently completed Wild Wheels, his producer Harley Hatcher's umbrella management organization had worked out a deal with a picture production company, Kendall Associates. The deal was to allow Epperson to work in four films over the next two years. Epperson was reportedly working on Justice Cain.

== Music career ==
Epperson recorded the songs, "Sittin' by the Highway" and "How I Feel for You" which were released on single, RCA Victor 9661 in 1968. It was one of the Cash Box Best Bets singles for the week of 2 November 1968.

It was reported in the 13 December 1969 issue of Billboard that the Amaret label had bought Epperson's master recording of "Butch Cassidy and the Sundance Kid" from Harley Hatcher. It was released in Australia on RCA 47-9661 in 1970. It made the AMR chart, getting to no. 64 for the week of 1 June 1970.

== Filmography ==
Year	Title	Role	Notes
1968	Jennie: Wife/Child	Singer in Bar	Uncredited
1969	Wild Wheels	Reb Smith	
1971	Cain's Cutthroats	Farrette	
1971	The Killers	Johnny Vegas	
1971	Big Jake	Saloon Bully in Escondero	
1971	The Female Bunch	Scott	
1973	The Devil and LeRoy Bassett	Sgt. Don	Directed by Robert E. Pearson
1976	A Whale Of A Tale	The Guard	(final film role)
