= Five Bloody Graves =

- Theatrical release poster
- Directed by: Al Adamson
- Written by: Robert Dix
- Produced by: Al Adamson; Robert Dix; John Cardos
- Starring: Robert Dix; Scott Brady; Jim Davis; John Carradine; Paula Raymond
- Cinematography: Vilmos Zsigmond
- Edited by: William Faris; Peter Perry Jr.
- Music by: Ed Norton
- Production companies: Independent-International Pictures; Dix International Pictures
- Distributed by: Columbia Pictures of Canada; Independent-International Pictures
- Release date: November 1969
- Running time: 88 minutes
- Country: United States
- Language: English

Five Bloody Graves is an American western film directed by Al Adamson and starring Robert Dix, Scott Brady, Jim Davis, John Carradine, and Paula Raymond. Fruita, Utah was used as a setting for the film.

== Cast ==
- Robert Dix as Ben Thompson
- Scott Brady Jim Wade
- Jim Davis as Clay Bates
- John Carradine as Boone Hawkins
- Paula Raymond as Kansas Kelly
- John Cardos as Joe Lightfoot/Satago
- Vicki Volante as Nora Miller
