= Blood of Dracula's Castle =

1969 film by Al Adamson and Jean Hewitt

- Theatrical release poster
- Directed by: Al Adamson; Jean Hewitt
- Written by: Rex Carlton
- Produced by: Martin B. Cohen; Samuel M. Sherman; Rex Carlton; Al Adamson; Paragon Pictures
- Starring: John Carradine; Alexander D'Arcy; Paula Raymond; Robert Dix; Vicki Volante; John Cardos
- Cinematography: László Kovács
- Edited by: Peter Perry Jr.
- Distributed by: Crown International Pictures(theatrical, US)
- Release date: October 5, 1969
- Running time: 84 min
- Country: United States
- Language: English

Blood of Dracula's Castle is a 1969 American horror cult B-movie directed by Al Adamson and starring John Carradine, Alexander D'Arcy, Paula Raymond, Robert Dix, Vicki Volante, and John Cardos. It was released by exploitation film specialists Crown International Pictures. Although his name was played up in the lurid ad campaign, John Carradine only played George the butler in this film, and not Count Dracula. DVD prints all suffer from extensive emulsion scratches.

== Plot ==
Count Dracula and his vampire wife are occupying Falcon Rock Castle in modern-day Arizona, hiding behind the identities of Count and Countess Townsend. When the castle's owner dies, the property passes on to a photographer named Glen Cannon, and Glen has decided to live there himself with his fiancée Liz. He drives out to the castle to inform the Townsends that they will have to move out. But his car breaks down when he gets there, and he and Liz have to spend the night with the Townsends.

The Townsends are actually vampires who sleep in coffins and lure pretty young girls to the castle to be drained of blood by their butler George, who then mixes real Bloody Marys for the couple, which they drink from martini glasses. George and Mango, the hunchback, keep mini-skirted women chained up in the basement, occasionally sacrificing one of them to "the Great God Luna" by burning them at the stake. Then there is a guy named Johnny, who becomes a serial killer when the moonlight strikes him (or a werewolf, depending on whether you watch the theatrical version or the late-night-TV version, the latter of which added a few werewolf scenes).

Glen and Liz accidentally witness one of the women being sacrificed in the cellar. Dracula and the Countess try to force Glen to sell the castle to them. In the final confrontation, George the butler is killed, the remaining women prisoners are freed, Mango the hunchback gets shot, hit with an ax, and set afire before dying. The vampires wind up exposed to sunlight and dissolve away into dust. Glen and Liz decide not to live in the castle after all, and drive off together. However, two bats emerge unseen from the ashes and fly away.

== Cast ==
- John Carradine as George, the butler
- Alexander D'Arcy as Count Dracula, alias Count Charles Townsend
- Paula Raymond as Countess Dracula, alias Countess Townsend
- Robert Dix as Johnny the serial killer (or werewolf)
- Gene Otis Shayne as Glen Cannon (as Gene O'Shane)
- Jennifer Bishop as Liz Arden (as Barbara Bishop)
- Vicki Volante as Ann, motorist-victim
- Ray Young as Mango the hunchback
- John 'Bud' Cardos (credited as John Cardos) as prison guard
- Ken Osborne as telegram delivery man
- Joyce King as body in the water

== Production ==
Ostensibly located in Arizona, the film was actually shot at Shea's Castle, near Lancaster, California. Other portions of the film were shot in the Coachella Valley, California.

Jayne Mansfield was originally set to star in the film as Countess Townsend, but she died in a car accident before shooting began.

A proposed sequel, which was going to be titled Dracula's Coffin, was announced, but never made.

== Music ==
The introduction to the film features the song "The Next Train Out" performed by Gil Bernal, with lyrics by Bob Russell and music by Lincoln Mayorga.

== See also ==
- List of American films of 1969
