= Robert Fuller (actor) =

American actor (born 1933)

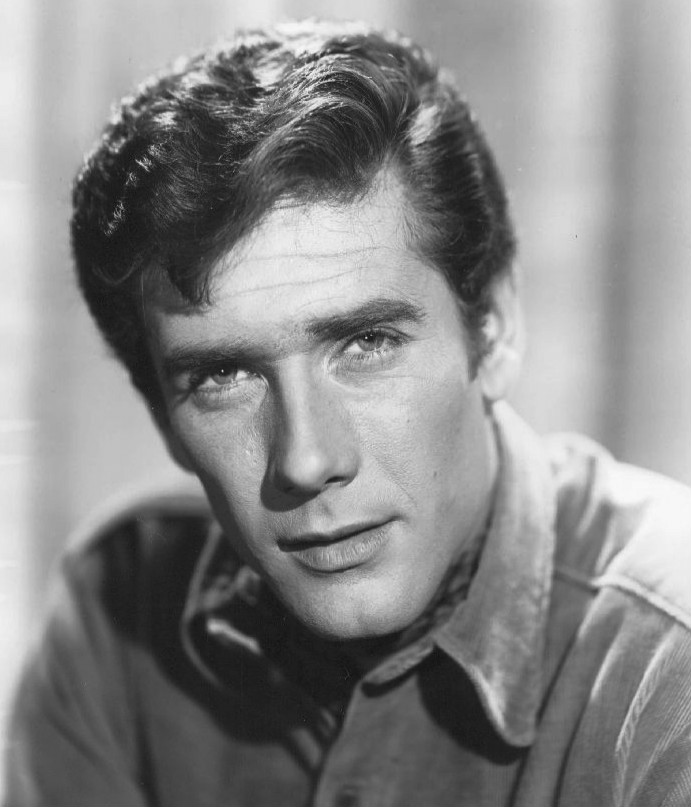
- Fuller in 1968
- Born: Leonard Leroy Lee; July 29, 1933 (age 93); Troy, New York, U.S.
- Other name: Robert Simpson Jr.
- Occupation: Actor
- Years active: 1952–2003
- Known for: Emergency!; Laramie; Wagon Train; The Hard Ride
- Spouses: Patricia Lee Lyon (m. 1962; div. 1984) Jennifer Savidge (m. 2001)
- Children: 3
- Website: robertfuller.info

Robert Fuller (born Leonard Leroy Lee; July 29, 1933) is an American retired actor. Fuller was known for his deep "charcoal" voice, his roles on the popular Western series Laramie as Jess Harper and Wagon Train as Cooper Smith, and as Dr. Kelly Brackett in the medical/action drama Emergency! (1972–1977).

He was also in several movies, including: The Brain from Planet Arous (1957), Teenage Thunder (1957), Return of the Seven (1966), Incident at Phantom Hill (1966), What Ever Happened to Aunt Alice? (1969), and The Hard Ride (1971).

== Early life ==
Robert Fuller was born Leonard Leroy Lee on July 29, 1933, in Troy, New York, the only child of Elizabeth Lee, a dance instructor. Later in his childhood, Betty married Robert Simpson Sr., a Naval Academy officer. In 1939, the family moved to Key West, Florida, where, already known by the nickname of "Buddy", he took the name Robert Simpson Jr. His parents owned a dancing school in Florida. His family also lived in Chicago for a year before moving back to Florida. Simpson, Jr., as he was then still formally known, attended the Miami Military School for fifth and sixth grades, and Key West High School for ninth grade. He dropped out at age 14 because he disliked school and was doing poorly there. In 1950, at the age of 16, he and his parents moved to Hollywood, California, where his first job was as a stunt man. He also worked at Grauman's Chinese Theatre, beginning as a doorman, becoming assistant manager by age 18. At the urging of friends, Simpson, Jr., joined the Screen Actors Guild, changed his name to Robert Fuller, and embarked on a career in acting.

== Career ==
=== Early career ===
He started his career in his teen years, as a dancer, stuntman, and extra.

Fuller's first small role was as an extra in the 1952 film Above and Beyond. This was the first of many projects, including as a cheerleader and football player in I Love Melvin. In 1953, he again had uncredited parts in Gentlemen Prefer Blondes (which starred Marilyn Monroe) and the Doris Day classic, Calamity Jane. His career went on hold for military service in Korea in the United States Army. He returned to the United States in 1955.

Although he had considered giving up acting, Fuller, at the suggestion of his best friend, Chuck Courtney, attended Richard Boone's acting classes. Boone suggested that Fuller study under the tutelage of Sanford Meisner at New York City's Neighborhood Playhouse.

Fuller's first recorded speaking role was in Friendly Persuasion in 1956, where he worked with future Laramie co-star John Smith and another close friend, Doug McClure, as well as Gary Cooper. His speaking part was cut, though he can be seen in two separate roles in the film. He portrayed a POW in 1956's Strange Intruder.

In the 1956 episode "The Comeback" in the religious anthology series, Crossroads, Fuller played a former soldier. In 1957, Fuller was cast in his first major film role in Teenage Thunder. He said of it:

I always wanted to be in show business and with the help of my best buddy, Chuck Courtney, who was an actor then, he helped get me my first starring role in a movie called Teenage Thunder. It was a break for me, and since Chuck had the pull at the time to get the director, Paul Helmick, use me for the bad guy and not another actor that he really wanted. It was the gateway to many other roles, which led to the Laramie series and so on and so forth.

— Robert Fuller, emergencyfans.com

=== Television work in the late 1950s and 1960s ===
Fuller became an immensely popular character actor, guest-starring in dozens of television programs including Buckskin, The Big Valley, The Californians, The Restless Gun, The Lawless Years, U.S. Marshal, Panic!, M Squad, The Adventures of Rin-Tin-Tin, The Monroes, and Lux Playhouse.

In 1959, he played a character accused of arson in Broderick Crawford's syndicated series, Highway Patrol. He also made appearances in ABC's The Life and Legend of Wyatt Earp and Mickey Spillane's syndicated Mike Hammer.

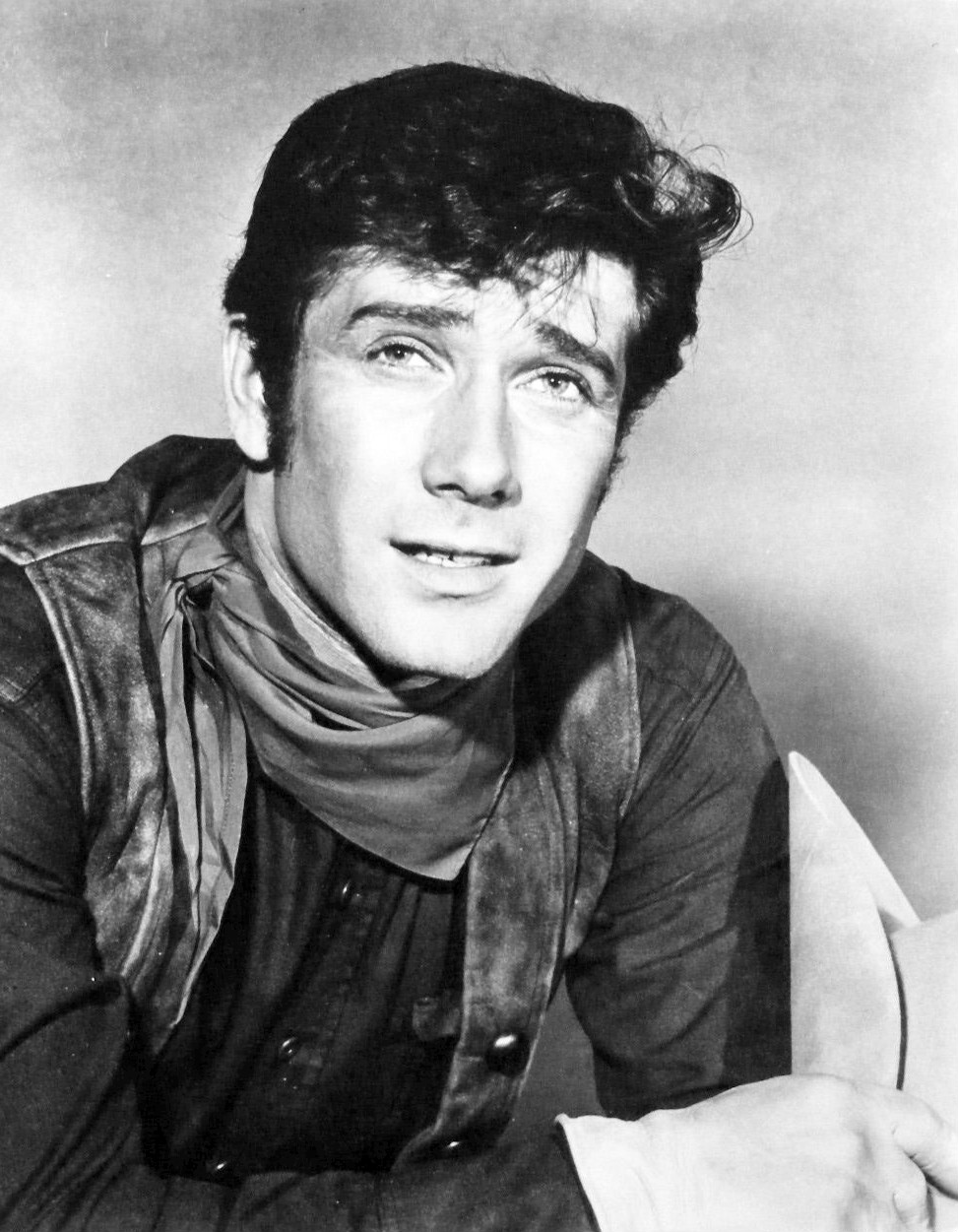
Fuller as Cooper Smith in Wagon Train

He played Alex in the 1958 "Gunsmith" episode of Death Valley Days, then portrayed the clever Mexican-American cattle rustler Johnny Santos in the episode "Ten in Texas" in 1959.

On February 24, 1959, Fuller guest-starred as Joe Cole in the "Blind is the Killer" episode of NBC's Cimarron City, a young gunfighter seeking a reputation who found his target in mayor Matt Rockford played by George Montgomery. (This appearance propelled him into a lead role seven months later in Laramie with Cimarron City regular John Smith.)

In the summer of 1959, Fuller guest starred as young outlaw Buck Harmon in the episode "The Friend" on the ABC/Warner Bros. series, Lawman. In the story line, Harmon is estranged from his minister father, played by Robert F. Simon. When the outlaw gang comes to Laramie, Buck switches sides to help his old friend, Deputy Johnny McKay (Peter Brown). In the shootout, Harmon is gunned down, but his father is spared. Fuller also appeared as Davey Carey in another Lawman episode, "The Souvenir", in 1959.

Fuller was David Dortort's second choice for the role of Lorne Greene's youngest cocky, impish son, Joseph "Little Joe" Cartwright, on NBC's Bonanza, but the role went to Michael Landon. Fuller then landed the role of Jess Harper on Laramie, which ran from 1959 to 1963. Fuller was cast opposite one of his best friends, John Smith. Smith had already been cast as Jess Harper; Fuller was asked to screen test for the character of Slim Sherman. Fuller insisted he would be better as Harper, and after the screen test, he became Jess and Smith got the part of Slim.

Laramie eventually aired in more than 70 countries. When it ended its run in 1963, Fuller jumped to another Western, Wagon Train alongside John McIntire (a veteran film actor, a two-time guest-star on Laramie), Frank McGrath, and Terry Wilson. According to an August 17, 2009, interview for On Screen and Beyond, Fuller noted that he was not brought in to replace Robert Horton (a lifelong friend Fuller had met in 1954) as the wagon train scout. He resembled Horton and the two shared the same birthday, but Horton was nine years Fuller's senior. Horton had already departed from the cast a year prior to Fuller's stepping in to complete the series' final two seasons.

Though the genre was fading in the late 1960s, Fuller appeared in a handful more westerns in 1966. He starred in Incident at Phantom Hill. He portrayed the ill-fated military Captain William Judd Fetterman in "Massacre at Fort Phil Kearney" on NBC's Bob Hope Presents the Chrysler Theatre. He was Vin in Return of the Seven (1966), a sequel to The Magnificent Seven. He portrayed Captain Jeffrey Stone in the "Court Martial" episode of The Monroes (1966).

He also appeared in the 1969 thriller What Ever Happened to Aunt Alice?, and worked with Joel McCrea in the 1976 Western Mustang Country, McCrea's last role. Fuller also appeared in the Hec Ramsey episode, The Mystery of Chalk Hill (1973), as well as the 1979 TV action movie Disaster on the Coastliner.

=== Emergency! ===
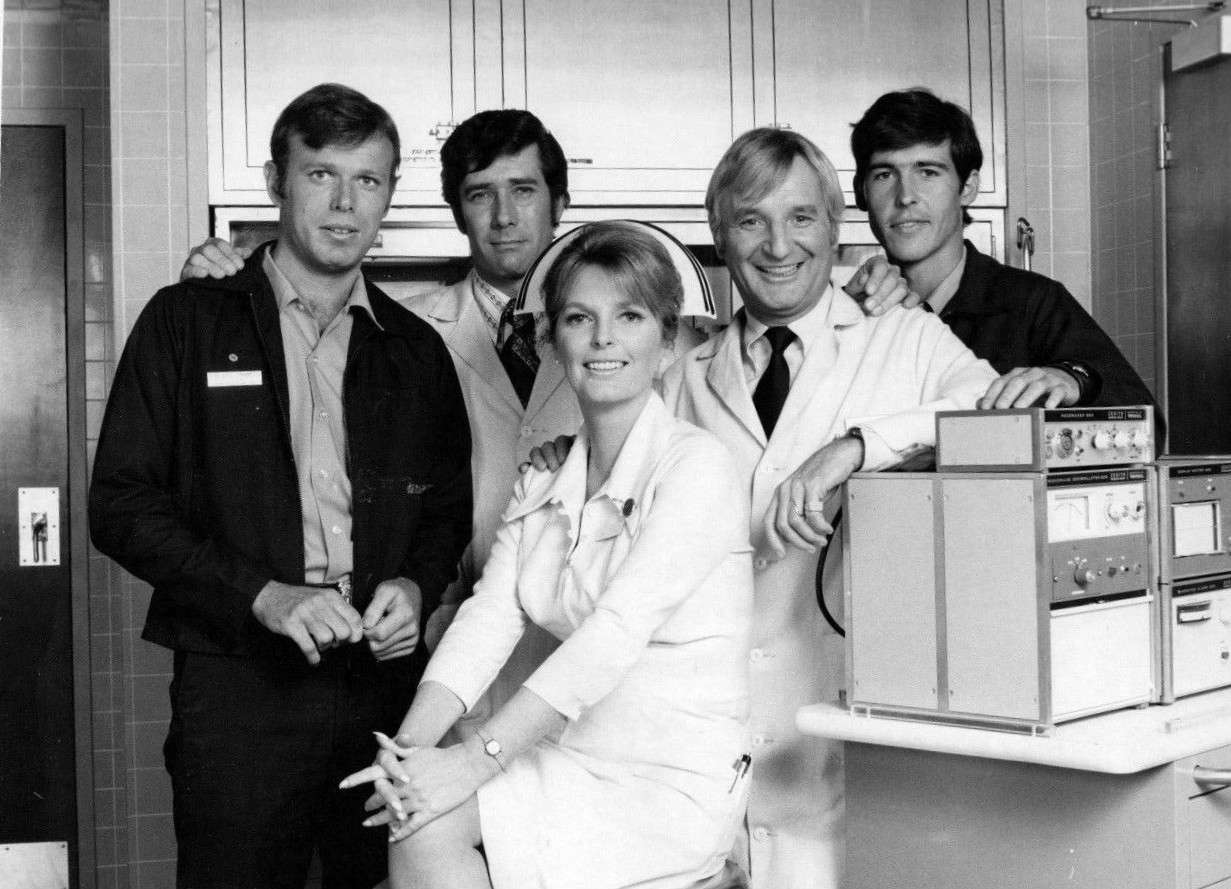
Cast of TV's Emergency! (1973), L-R: Kevin Tighe, Robert Fuller, Julie London, Bobby Troup, and Randolph Mantooth

After producer Jack Webb saw Fuller in the 1971 movie The Hard Ride, he insisted Fuller star in his new NBC medical drama, Emergency!. He had already cast singer and actress, Julie London in the role of Dixie McCall, Chief Nurse of The Emergency Room. Fuller was reluctant to play a doctor, especially in a series with a contemporary urban setting. The persistent Webb convinced him to accept the role of Dr. Kelly Brackett, Chief of Emergency Medicine, at the fictitious Rampart General Hospital. In the aforementioned 2009 interview with On Screen and Beyond, Fuller said that he had twice, politely, rejected the role of Brackett. Webb then reminded Fuller, much less politely, that Western shows had been repeatedly cancelled over the previous five years and that the genre was on the decline.

Fuller's on-screen appearances on the last season of Emergency! were lightly reduced, as he was growing tired of the role, and wanted to look for more work in Westerns; the series then began focusing on the actual cause of the "emergency" (versus the aftermath, as had been done in prior seasons), and shifted to more screen time for the remaining cast.

=== In the 1980s and the 1990s ===
In 1980, Fuller starred in the pilot of a CBS Western series Jake's Way as the title character. It was supposed to be his comeback to television, but the series failed to sell.

As the 1990s approached, he guest starred in more than 20 television shows, including The Love Boat, The Fall Guy (two episodes), Murder, She Wrote, Matt Houston, Tour of Duty, The Adventures of Brisco County, Jr., JAG, and Diagnosis: Murder (two episodes). He had a recurring role as Laramie's Jess Harper's great-great-grandson and retired El Paso Texas Ranger Wade Harper on Walker, Texas Ranger with Chuck Norris and Clarence Gilyard. He also portrayed Ranger Cabe Wallace in the episode "Last of a Breed."

His final film appearances included portraying Dr. Hackett, based on his Emergency! character, in the parody film Repossessed (1990) and a cameo as a poker player along with many other old western stars in Maverick (1994).

== Personal life ==
Fuller dabbled in singing. He did several "bandstand" gigs with Bill Aken's Los Nomadas rock group at holiday festivities in Whiskey Flats, California. While acting as grand marshal for the local Memorial Day parade, he performed the 1950s song "Caribbean", singing the same verse over and over. He later told the band that he only knew the first verse of the song.

In 1967, he recorded an LP in Munich, Germany. Most of the songs were recorded in German, including "Ein einsamer Cowboy" ("Lonesome Cowboy"), "Adios Mexicana" ("Goodbye Mexican Girl"), "Überall auf der Welt" ("All Over the World"), and "Sind wie Blumen" ("Girls Are Like Flowers").

Fuller and Patricia Lee Lyon married on December 20, 1962, and had three children. The two divorced in 1984; Lyon died of cancer in 1994.

By the 1990s, Fuller had largely retired from the film business. His last acting credit was in 2001. He married actress Jennifer Savidge, known for her role on NBC's St. Elsewhere series, on May 19, 2001.

Fuller reunited with the rest of the surviving Emergency! cast at the Emergency! Convention '98, at the Burbank Airport Hilton, October 9–11, 1998. All of the main actors attended except for Julie London, who had suffered a stroke in 1995, and was later diagnosed with lung cancer. London's husband Bobby Troup died four months after the reunion. Fuller and the rest of the cast and crew answered fans' questions and reminisced about their time together, during which the castmates said they got along well.

On March 10, 2010, Fuller presented James Drury with the "Cowboy Spirit Award" at the Festival of the West. He also paid tribute to late co-star John Smith. During the tribute, he recounted many details about Smith's life, especially their on- and off-screen chemistry during their days on Laramie. Smith had also attended the Festival of the West for two seasons before his declining health rendered his appearance impossible.

In 2004, Fuller and wife Jennifer Savidge moved from Los Angeles to a ranch in north Texas. His neighbor and long-term friend Alex Cord had urged Fuller to move to Cooke County. The two met in 1961 on the set of Laramie when Cord made his television acting debut.

Fuller's stepfather, Robert Simpson Sr., died in 2009.

On October 9, 2010, Fuller, Drury, and Don Reynolds participated in the Wild West Toy Show, sponsored by Bob Terry in Azle, Texas near Fort Worth. The event promotes horse riding and the purchase and exchange of Western merchandise.

In September 2012, Fuller, along with several other Western celebrities, attended the first-ever Spirit of the Cowboy Western Festival held at Chestnut Square in McKinney, Texas. The event is billed as the biggest and best Western festival in north Texas.

On July 29, 2013, Fuller celebrated his 80th birthday with his fans and his wife while vacationing on a ranch in Libby, Montana.

On November 9, 2014, Fuller and fellow actor/fishing buddy, James Best, whom he met on the sixth episode of Laramie, attended the 100th birthday celebration of their lifelong friend and fellow actor Norman Lloyd, in Los Angeles, California. Best died a few months later.

== Awards ==
In 1961, Fuller won the Best Actor Award in Japan and the Japanese Golden Order of Merit, presented by the Empress of Japan. Fuller was the first American ever to earn this award.

In 1970, he won five Ottos, which are the German equivalent of the Emmy Awards. That same year, he won the Buffalo Bill award for Outstanding Western Entertainment.

On April 16, 1974, Fuller won the Outstanding Service Award from the Huntsville (Alabama) Fire Department.

For his contribution to the television industry, Robert Fuller has a star on the Hollywood Walk of Fame at 6608 Hollywood Blvd.

In 1989, he won the Golden Boot Award.

On March 18, 2006, a bronze sculpture of Jess Harper on Traveller was awarded to him by the Robert Fuller Fandom and the National Festival of the West.

On October 12, 2007, he won the Silver Spur Award along with Stuart Whitman, Peter Brown, and Dean Smith, who received a lifetime achievement award.

On April 12, 2008, Fuller was inducted into the National Cowboy and Western Heritage Museum in Oklahoma City.

On October 12, 2013, Fuller was the first recipient of the Spirit of the Cowboy Lonestar Legacy Award.

On October 27, 2018, Fuller was inducted into the Texas Trail Of Fame.

On April 11, 2019, Fuller was inducted into the Newhall Walk of Western Stars.

== Filmography ==
- 1958: The Californians (TV) Season 1, Episode 29 (Pipeline) as Cobber Bannon
- 1958: Death Valley Days (TV) Season 6, Episode 16 (Ten in Texas) as Johnny Santos
- 1958: Death Valley Days (TV) Season 7, Episode 13 (The Gunsmith) as Alex
- 1958: The Restless Gun (TV) Season 2, Episode 12 (Peligroso) as Bud Bardeen
- 1959: The Restless Gun (TV) Season 2, Episode 16 (Shadow of a Gunfighter) as Jim Winfield
- 1959: U.S. Marshal (TV) Season 1, Episode 16 (Pursuit) as Corporal Eddie Wallace
- 1959: Cimarron City (TV) Season 1, Episode 20 (Blind Is the Killer) as Joe Cole
- 1959: The Life and Legend of Wyatt Earp (TV) Season 4, Episode 29 (The Judas Goat) as Hank Drew
- 1959: Mike Hammer (TV) Season 2, Episode 3 (I Ain't Talkin') as Jimmy Nelson
- 1959: Mike Hammer (TV) Season 2, Episode 13 (Park the Body) as Roy Barlow
- 1959: Lawman (TV) Season 1, Episode 27 (The Souvenir) as Davey Carey
- 1959: Lawman (TV) Season 1, Episode 39 (The Friend) as Buck Harmon
- 1959: Highway Patrol (TV) Season 4, Episode 38 (Fire) as Judd Patterson
- 1966: The Monroes (TV) Season 1, Episode 11 (Court Martial) as Captain Geoffrey Stone
- 1967: The Big Valley (TV) Season 3, Episode 3 (A Flock of Trouble) as Carl Wheeler
- 1967: The Virginian (TV) Season 5, Episode 26 (A Welcoming Town) as Clint Richards
- 1971: The Virginian (TV) Season 9, Episode 19 (Flight from Memory) as Carl Ellis
- 1971: Dan August (TV) Season 1, Episode 14 (The Titan) as William Britain
- 1972: Adam-12 (TV) Season 5, Episode 4 (Lost and Found) as Dr. Kelly Brackett
- 1973: Hec Ramsey (TV) Season 1, Episode 5 (The Mystery of Chalk Hill) as Dixie Hollister
- 1978: The Oregon Trail (TV) Season 1, Episode 12 (Suffer the Children) as Hancock
- 1982: Fantasy Island (TV) Season 5, Episode 22 (The Ghost's Story/The Spoilers) as Nick Tanner
- 1982: The Love Boat (TV) Season 5, Episode 13 (Doc Take the Fifth/Safety Last/A Business Affair) as Ralph Kirby
- 1983: The Fall Guy (TV) Season 3, Episode 10 (Hollywood Shorties) as Lieutenant Ryan
- 1985: The Love Boat (TV) Season 8, Episode 18 (Love on the Line/Don't Call Me Gopher/Her Honor, the Mayor) as Phil Haines
- 1985: Matt Houston (TV) Season 3, Episode 18 (New Orleans Nightmare) as Phillip Caulder
- 1986: The Fall Guy (TV) Season 5, Episode 14 (The Lucky Stiff) as Mr. Watson
- 1988: Tour of Duty (TV) Season 1, Episode 15 (Soldiers) as Jack Purcell
- 1988: Murder, She Wrote (TV) Season 4, Episode 22 (The Body Politic) as Arthur Drelinger.
- 1989: Paradise (TV) Season 2, Episode 3 (Home Again) as Sam Clanton
- 1993: The Adventures of Brisco County, Jr. (TV) Season 1, Episode 1 (Pilot) as Kenyon Drummond
- 1993: The Adventures of Brisco County, Jr. (TV) Season 1, Episode 4 (Brisco in Jalisco) as Kenyon Drummond
- 1995: Kung Fu: The Legend Continues (TV) Season 3, Episode 6 (Gunfighters) as McBride
- 1995: Renegade (TV) Season 4, Episode 6 (Dead Heat) as Sam Crow
- 1997: Diagnosis: Murder (TV) Season 5, Episode 3 (Malibu Fire) as Chris Newman
- 1997: Walker, Texas Ranger (TV) Season 6, Episode 7 (Last of a Breed: Part 2) as Ranger Cabe Wallace
- 1998: Viper (TV) Season 3, Episode 19 (Homecoming) as Ethan Cole
- 2000: Diagnosis: Murder (TV) Season 7, Episode 13 (Frontier Dad) as Bob McLane
- 2000: Walker, Texas Ranger (TV) Season 8, Episode 14 (A Matter of Principle) as Wade Harper
- 2001: Walker, Texas Ranger (TV) Season 9, Episode 23 (The Final Showdown: Part 1) as Wade Harper
- 2001: Walker, Texas Ranger (TV) Season 9. Episode 24 (The Final Showdown: Part 2) as Wade Harper
- 2001: JAG (TV) Season 6, Episode 16 (Retreat, Hell) as Marine Corps General
- 2001: JAG (TV) Season 6, Episode 17 (Valor) as Marine Corps General
