= Robert Dix =

American film actor (1935–2018)

- Born: May 8, 1935; Los Angeles, California
- Died: August 6, 2018 (aged 83); Tucson, Arizona
- Other name: Bob Brimmer
- Occupation: Actor
- Years active: 1954–1974
- Spouse(s): Janet Lake (1956–1959, divorce); Anna May Slaughter; Darlene Lucht
- Parent: Richard Dix

Robert Warren Brimmer (May 8, 1935 – August 6, 2018), known professionally as Robert Dix, was an American film actor. He appeared in 35 films between 1954 and 1974.

== Biographic data ==
Dix was born in Los Angeles, California, the son of actor Richard Dix. As a teenager, he left home after his mother remarried.

Dix initially was billed as Bob Brimmer, using his legal name. For a year, he worked with the National Academy of Theater Arts in New York City. Following that experience, he gained a two-year contract with Metro-Goldwyn-Mayer. He later appeared in Forbidden Planet (1956), Forty Guns (1957), and other films including a lead role in Maury Dexter's Air Patrol. In the 1960s he appeared in a string of b-movies by Al Adamson including Hell's Bloody Devils, Satan's Sadists, Blood of Dracula's Castle, and Five Bloody Graves. His last role was a doomed agent in Roger Moore's first James Bond Feature, Live And Let Die, being killed before the opening credits during a marching New Orleans funeral that turns out to be his own.

On May 31, 1956, Dix married actress Janet Lake in Las Vegas. They divorced in 1959. Later he was married to Anna May Slaughter, a nightclub singer, and Darlene Lucht. Dix owned a home near Demuth Park in Palm Springs, California. He died of respiratory failure at a hospital in Tucson, Arizona, at age 83. He was buried at the Russellville–Dragoon Cemetery in Cochise County, Arizona.

== Television appearances ==
In 1961, Dix played the part of Jamie, a lieutenant in the US Cavalry on the television program Gunsmoke and later that same year as “Spotted Wolf”, a love torn Indian hunted by the Cavalry in the S7E10 “Indian Ford”.

== Filmography ==
Year	Title	Role	Notes
1954	Athena	Reporter	Uncredited
1955	Hit the Deck	Naval Officer	Uncredited
1955	The Glass Slipper	Young Man	Uncredited
1955	Interrupted Melody	Man on Beach	Uncredited
1955	Love Me or Leave Me	Assistant Director	Uncredited
1955	The Scarlet Coat	Lt. Evans	Uncredited
1955	The King's Thief	Husky	
1955	I'll Cry Tomorrow	Henry	Uncredited
1956	Diane	Young Officer	Uncredited
1956	Meet Me in Las Vegas	New Frontier Player	Uncredited
1956	Forbidden Planet	Crewman Grey	
1956	Screaming Eagles	Pvt. Peterson	
1957	Forty Guns	Chico Bonell	
1958	Thundering Jets	Lt. Jimmy Erskine	
1958	Frankenstein's Daughter	Police Det. Bill Dillon	
1959	Lone Texan	Carpetbagger	
1959	Frontier Doctor	Corporal Travis	Episode: "Superstition Mountain"
1960	13 Fighting Men	Lt. Wilcox	
1960	Young Jesse James	Frank James	
1961	The Little Shepherd of Kingdom Come	Caleb Turner	
1962	Air Patrol	Sgt. Bob Castle	
1965	Deadwood '76	Wild Bill Hickok	
1968	The Road Hustlers	Mark Reedy	
1968	Las Vegas Strangler	Jeff Murray	aka: No Tears for the Damned
1969	Blood of Dracula's Castle	Johnny	
1969	Satan's Sadists	Willie	
1969	Wild Wheels	King	
1969	Five Bloody Graves	Ben Thompson	
1970	Hell's Bloody Devils	Cunk	
1970	Cain's Cutthroats	Amison – Gang Leader	
1970	Horror of the Blood Monsters	Dr. Manning	
1970	The Rebel Rousers	Miguel	
1970	The Red, White, and Black	Walking Horse	
1971	The Killers	Rick Wilson	
1973	Live and Let Die	Hamilton	Uncredited (dubbed by Shane Rimmer)
