= List of people from Cloud County, Kansas =

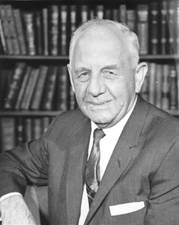
Frank Carlson, Kansas politician and former governor

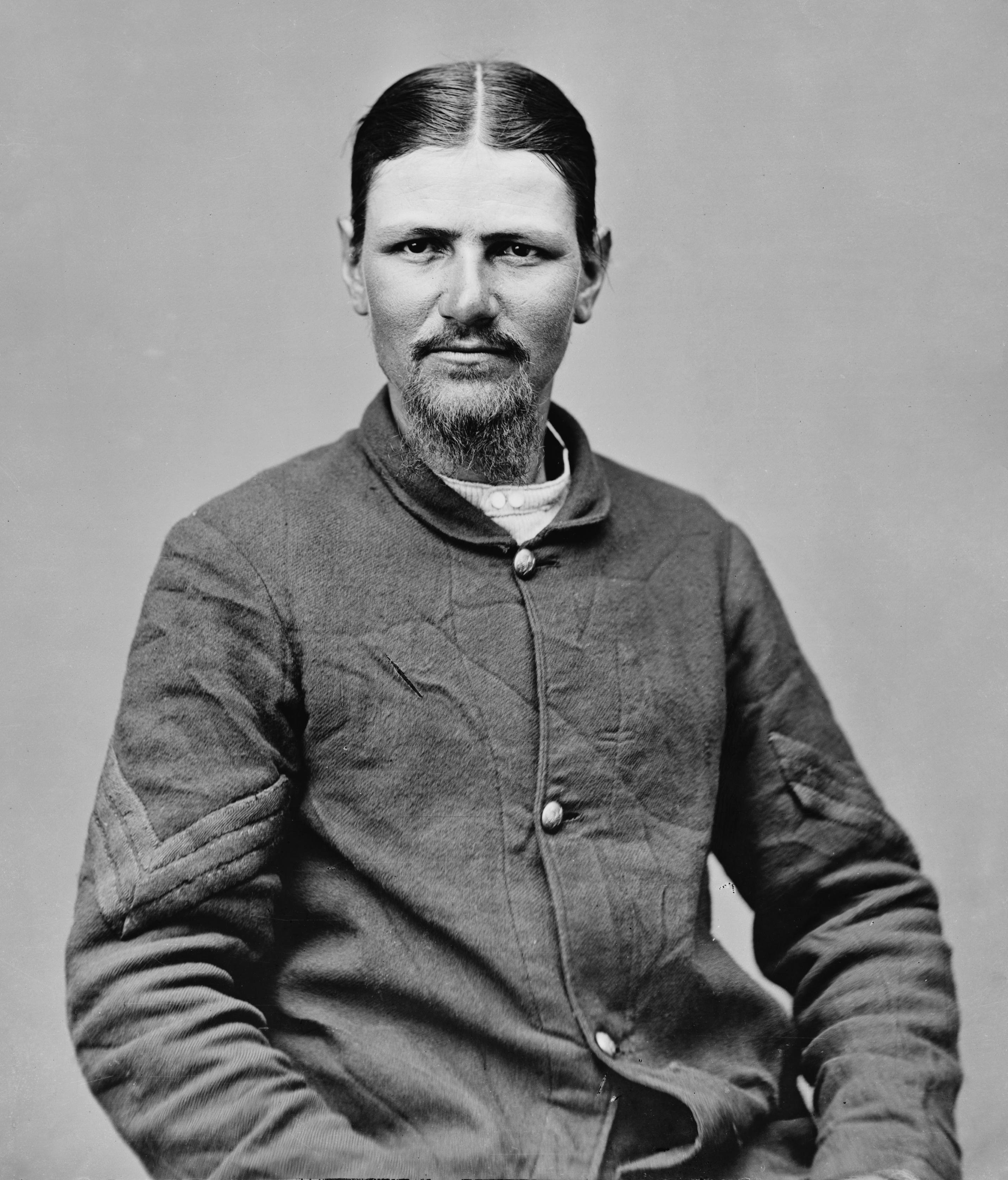
Boston Corbett was the Union Army soldier who shot and killed Abraham Lincoln's assassin, John Wilkes Booth. He lived south of Concordia.

The following is a list of people from Cloud County, Kansas. Inclusion on the list should be reserved for notable people past and present who have lived in the county, either in cities or rural areas.

== Academics ==
- May Louise Cowles, early advocate of teaching home economics
- George Norlin, former president of the University of Colorado

== Arts ==
- Jim Garver, country music guitarist
- Robert E. Pearson, filmmaker
- Helen Talbot, film actress and pin-up girl
- Patrice Wymore, film and stage actress

== Athletes ==
- Tom Brosius, track and field athlete
- Keith Christensen, professional football player
- George Dockins, major league baseball player
- Bill Dotson, track and field athlete
- Mike Gardner, college football coach
- Larry Hartshorn, professional football player
- Mike Kirkland, women's track & field coach
- Tim McCarty, college football coach
- Ernest C. Quigley, college football coach and major league baseball umpire
- Harry Short, baseball player
- Shanele Stires, professional basketball player
- Elmer Stricklett, major league baseball player
- Kaye Vaughan, professional football player

== Clergy ==
- Orval Butcher, founding pastor of Skyline Church
- Most Reverend Charles Joseph Chaput, OFM Cap, archbishop of the Roman Catholic Archdiocese of Philadelphia, Pennsylvania
- Right Rev. John Francis Cunningham, bishop of Concordia
- Jim Garlow, pastor of Skyline Church
- Constantine Scollen, missionary priest, resident 1896–1898

== Journalists ==
- Henry Buckingham, newspaper publisher
- Avis Tucker, publisher

== Politicians ==
- Charles H. Blosser, namesake of Blosser Municipal Airport
- Elaine Bowers, member of the Kansas Legislature
- Napoleon Bonaparte Brown, politician and businessman
- Frank Carlson, United States senator, representative, and governor of Kansas
- James Manney Hagaman, founder of Concordia, Kansas
- Deanell Reece Tacha, retired United States federal judge
- W. O. Woods, former treasurer of the United States

== Others ==
- Boston Corbett, soldier who shot John Wilkes Booth
- Pop Hollinger, one of the first to collect comic books for resale
- Louise Davis McMahon (1873–1966), philanthropist

== See also ==
- Lists of people from Kansas
