= Leo G. Cox =

American minister, theologian and educator (1912–2001)

Leo George Cox (1912–2001) was an American minister, theologian, and educator.

== Early life and education ==
Cox was born on July 31, 1912, and accepted Christ at the age of ten. He received his bachelor's degree from Miltonvale Wesleyan College, in 1937, and later earned a B.D., an M.Rel. from Indiana Wesleyan University, and an M.A. and Ph.D. in religious studies from the University of Iowa.

== Religious and academic career ==
Cox was ordained as a minister in the Wesleyan Methodist Church, served a missionary in Australia. While in Australia, Cox served as president of Kingsley College from 1949–1955. Cox wrote John Wesley's Concept of Perfection; according to the Wesleyan Church; this book has become a "classic in Wesley studies." Cox also contributed to the Wesleyan Bible Commentary and the Beacon Bible Commentary. Desiring to bring together scholars from the Wesleyan tradition, Cox founded the Wesleyan Theological Society, and served as the society's first president in 1965.

When it was decided to merge Miltonvale Wesleyan College and Bartlesville Wesleyan College into one institution, Cox became president of both colleges, and later became president of the combined institution (which is now called Oklahoma Wesleyan University.) Cox later served as General Secretary of Educational Institutions for the Wesleyan Church.

== Personal life and death ==
Cox married Esther Burgan in 1934. After Esther's death in 1990, Cox married his brother's widow, Leila Cox, in 1992. Leila died in 1994. Cox died on August 28, 2001.
