= Henry Buckingham =

Henry Buckingham may refer to:

- Henry Buckingham (publisher) (1830–1916), American newspaper publisher in Kansas
- Sir Henry Buckingham (politician) (1867–1931), British Conservative MP for Guildford 1922–1931
