= Oklahoma Wesleyan University =

Private university in Bartlesville, Oklahoma, US

- Former names: Central Pilgrim College (1905–1968); Bartlesville Wesleyan College (1968–2001)
- Type: Private university
- Established: 1905
- Religious affiliation: Wesleyan Church
- Endowment: US$5,461,866 (as of 2014)
- President: Yorton Clark (interim)
- Students: 1,204
- Location: Bartlesville, Oklahoma, U.S. 36°43′03″N 95°57′24″W
- Colors: Navy blue and yellow
- Nickname: Eagles
- Sporting affiliations: NAIA – KCAC; NCCAA Division I – Central
- Website: okwu.edu

Oklahoma Wesleyan University (OKWU) is a private university of the Wesleyan church in Bartlesville, Oklahoma, United States. OKWU offers over 30 undergraduate degrees to students at its Bartlesville campus, and it also offers six graduate degree programs as part of its online offerings.

OKWU is accredited by the Higher Learning Commission while the education, business, and nursing programs are accredited through program-specific organizations. In 2022, OKWU had 902 students enrolled, with approximately 782 of those in its undergraduate programs.

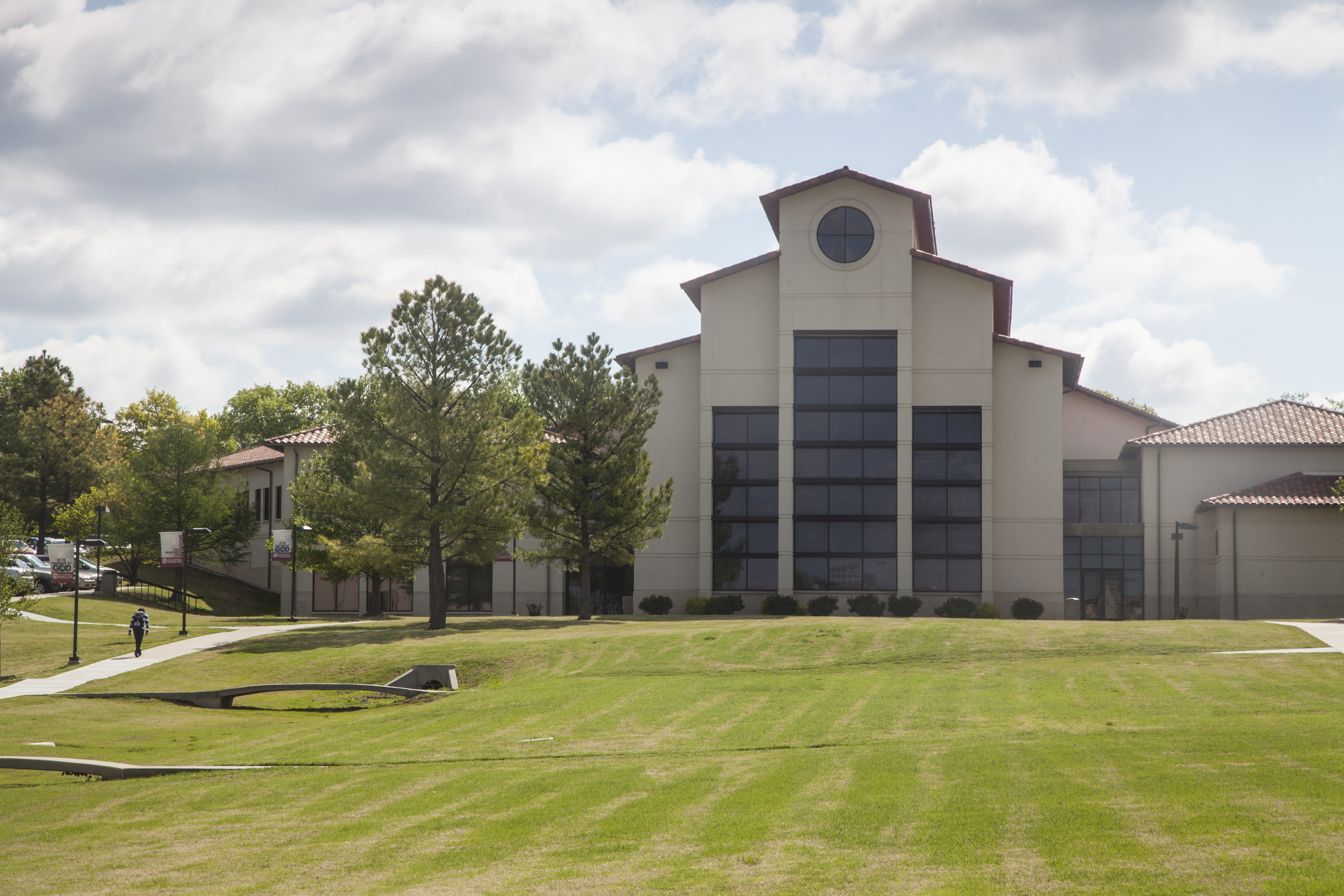
OKWU's Lyon Chapel and Fine Arts Center

== History ==
Oklahoma Wesleyan University traces its history back to 1905 through several antecedent schools.

- In 1905, Rocky Mountain Missionary and Evangelistic School was founded in Colorado Springs, Colorado. Affiliated with the Pilgrim Holiness Church, the school would undergo several name changes before becoming Colorado Springs Bible College in 1950. In 1958, the school moved from Colorado to Bartlesville, Oklahoma, and became Central Pilgrim College.
- Miltonvale Wesleyan College was founded in Miltonvale, Kansas, in 1909. It was affiliated with the Wesleyan Methodist Denomination. It trained students for 63 years before merging with Bartlesville Wesleyan College in 1972.
- The Pasadena Bible Training School was founded in Pasadena, California, in 1917. In 1960, it merged with Central Pilgrim College in Bartlesville, Oklahoma.

Oklahoma Wesleyan University was founded by The Wesleyan Church to provide higher education within a Christian environment for Wesleyan youth. Central Pilgrim College, its predecessor, was founded on the campus in Bartlesville, Oklahoma from a series of mergers of several schools: the Colorado Bible College (Colorado Springs, Colorado), the Pilgrim Bible College (Pasadena, California), and the Holiness Evangelistic Institute (El Monte, California). In 1958, the current day campus was purchased by Colorado Springs Bible College, which began operating as Central Pilgrim College in 1959. The campus purchase included La Quinta Mansion, the former home of oilman H.V. Foster and his family. The school changed its name to Bartlesville Wesleyan College in 1968, the same year of the merger of the Pilgrim Holiness and Wesleyan Methodist denominations to become the Wesleyan Church.

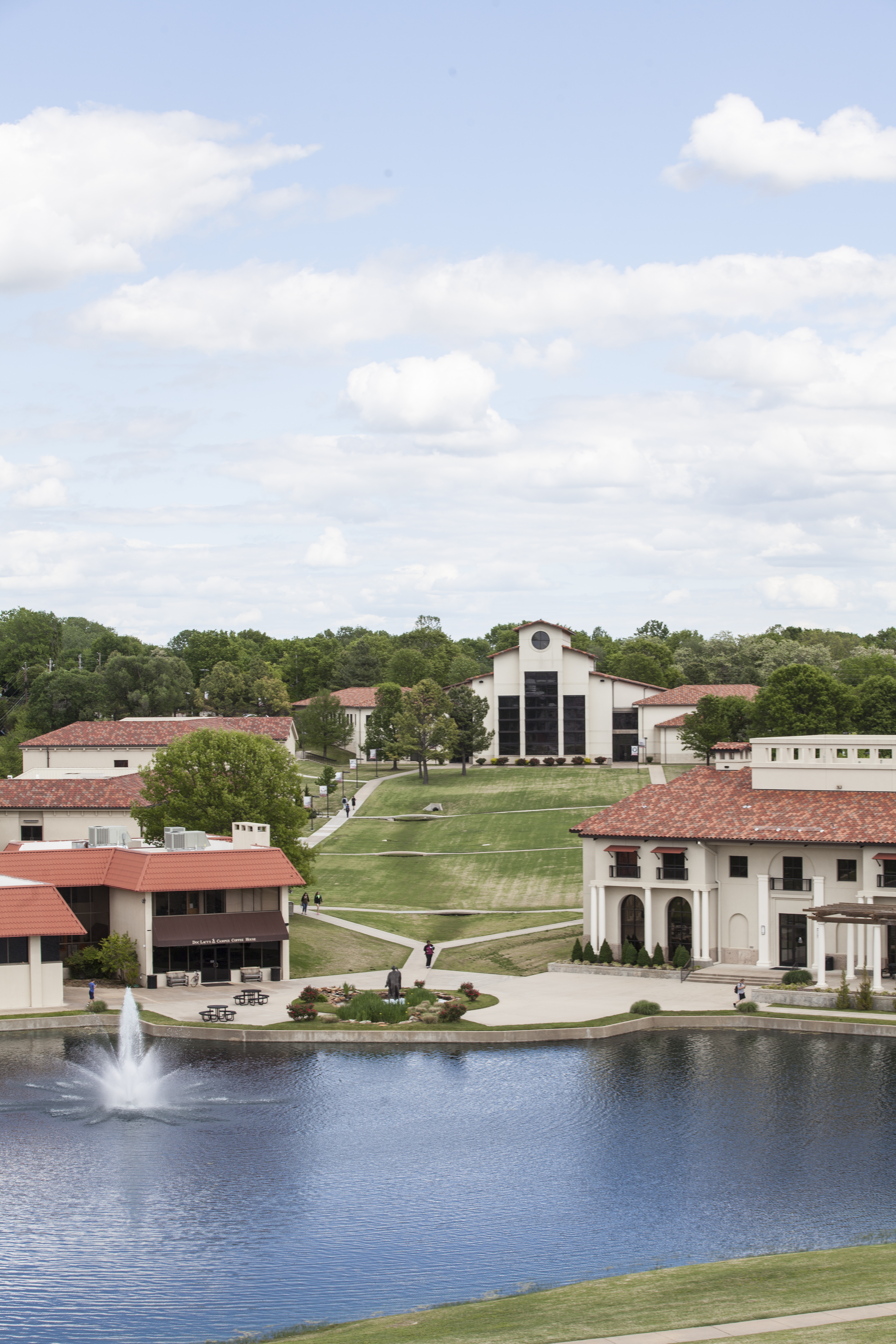
OKWU's Campus

In 1972, Miltonvale merged with Bartlesville Wesleyan College. That same year, BWC was accredited as a four-year, degree-granting institution.

Over the years the campus grew to include new dorm buildings, the Campbell Science Building, and the Haltom Campus Center. BWC's first ever intercollegiate athletic team was the 1971 men's basketball team. The campus athletic center, Mueller Sports Center, was completed in 1979. The Chapel Fine Arts Center was dedicated in 2000.

In August 2001, Bartlesville Wesleyan College became Oklahoma Wesleyan University (OKWU). A longtime member of the Council for Christian Colleges and Universities (CCCU), in 2015 the university withdrew from the organization. OKWU's president cited CCCU's "reluctance to make a swift decision" in response to the decisions of two member schools (Goshen College and Eastern Mennonite University) which changed their hiring policies to include same-sex couples, as an unwillingness to defend the biblical definition of marriage.

On August 15, 2016, OKWU joined a court challenge to a 2011 mandate from the U. S. Department of Education Office for Civil Rights requiring colleges and universities adjudicate what they called "a unconstitutional process and standard." Former president Piper stated, in part, that they "refuse to accept any government intrusion that would require OKWU to teach the antithesis of our Christian beliefs concerning sexual behavior" and that OKWU's students "should have the legal right to avail themselves of local law enforcement without their petition being compromised by the intrusion of an OCR-mandated committee of amateurs that contravenes the due process and confidentiality of the legal process." The suit was sponsored by the Foundation for Individual Rights in Education.

=== Presidents ===
- Leo Cox (1969–1974)
- John Snook (1974–1983)
- Paul Mills (1983–2002)
- Charles Joiner (interim, 2002)
- Everett Piper (2002–2019)
- James A. Dunn (2019–2026)
- Yorton Clark (interim, 2026-present)

== Academics ==
OKWU offers 54 majors through its five schools: its School of Arts & Sciences, School of Ministry & Christian Thought, School of Business, School of Education and Exercise Science, and School of Nursing.

=== Rankings ===
In 2019, it was ranked #85 in Regional Universities West, according to U.S. News & World Report.

== Athletics ==
The Oklahoma Wesleyan (OKWU) athletic teams are called the Eagles. The university is a member of the National Association of Intercollegiate Athletics (NAIA), primarily competing in the Kansas Collegiate Athletic Conference since the 2015–16 academic year. They are also a member of the National Christian College Athletic Association (NCCAA), primarily competing as an independent in the Central Region of the Division I level. The Eagles previously competed in the defunct Midlands Collegiate Athletic Conference (MCAC) from 1994–95 to 2014–15 (when the conference dissolved).

OKWU competes in 19 intercollegiate varsity sports: Men's sports include baseball, basketball, cross country, golf, soccer, tennis, track & field and wrestling; while women's sports include basketball, beach volleyball (added in 2021–22), cross country, golf, soccer, softball, tennis, track & field and volleyball; and co-ed sports include cheerleading and eSports.

== Notable alumni ==
- Kurt Bahr, Missouri state legislator
- David Brown, Minnesota state legislator
- Orval Butcher, minister
- Jim Garlow, minister, author, political activist
- Joshua Klumb, South Dakota state legislator
- Wilbur Nelson, minister and radio broadcaster, Morning Chapel Hour
- Jordan Tata, professional baseball player
