= Napoleon at Austerlitz =

Painting by Robert Braun and Michael Russell

- Artist: Robert Braun, Michael Russell
- Year: 1979
- Type: Drop Curtain
- Location: Brown Grand Theatre; Concordia, Kansas

Napoleon at Austerlitz is a 1979 painting by Robert Braun and Michael Russell on a theatre drop curtain at the Brown Grand Theatre in Concordia, Kansas. It is a reproduction of an 1836 Horace Vernet painting and actually depicts the Battle of Wagram.

== History ==
=== Original curtain ===
The original curtain was presented on opening night at the theatre on September 17, 1907 by Earl Brown as a "gift" to his father, Napoleon Bonaparte Brown (namesake of Napoleon Bonaparte), in recognition of his father's contribution to the community and to the theatre. The original curtain painting was created in 1907 for use at the theatre. Over the years, the work became damaged by use, water damage from storms, and age. The original still exists at the theatre but is not used.

=== Second curtain ===
A second drop curtain was created in 1979 during the theatre restoration. Both curtains were prepared by the Twin City Scenic Company of Minneapolis, Minnesota. The second curtain was prepared by Robert Braun and Michael Russell.

After several months, the new curtain was unveiled on January 7, 1979. The second curtain was presented to the Brown Grand Theatre as a memorial to Charles S. Cook, longtime Concordia resident.
