= Hagaman =

Hagaman may refer to:

- Hagaman (surname), a surname
- Hagaman, New York
