= 101st Illinois Infantry Regiment =

- Also known as the 101st Illinois or the 101st Illinois Volunteers
- State flag of Illinois
- Active: September 2, 1862 – June 21, 1865
- Country: United States
- Allegiance: Union
- Branch: Union Army
- Type: Infantry
- Size: Regiment; Battalion
- Part of: Army of the Cumberland
- Engagements: American Civil War: Holly Springs Raid (December 20, 1862); Siege of Vicksburg (May 18 – July 4, 1863); Battle of Wauhatchie (October 28 – 29, 1863); Battle of Missionary Ridge (November 25, 1863); Siege of Knoxville (November 17 - December 4, 1863); Battle of Resaca (May 13–15, 1864); Battle of Cassville (May 19, 1864); Battle of New Hope Church (May 25–26, 1864); Battle of Kennesaw Mountain (June 27, 1864); Battle of Kolb's Farm (June 22, 1864); Battle of Peachtree Creek (July 20, 1864); Sherman's March to the Sea (November 15 - December 21, 1864); Carolinas Campaign (January 1 - April 26, 1865

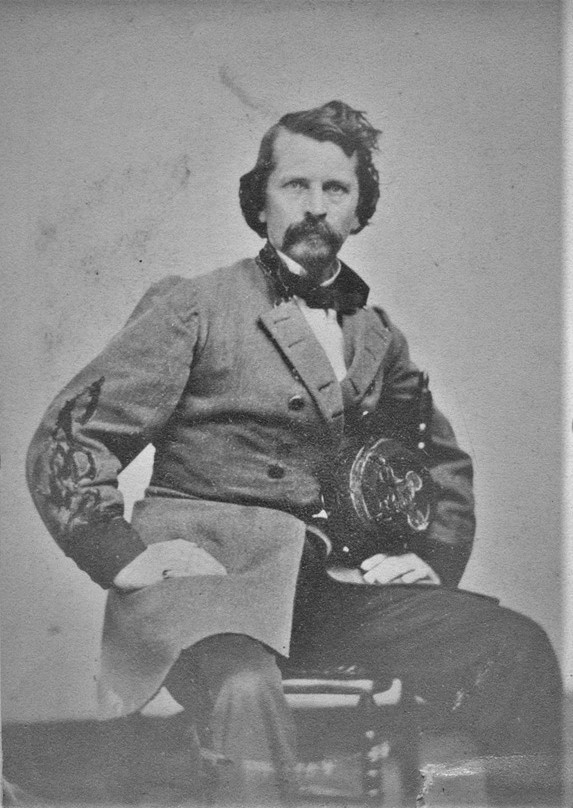
Confederate General Earl Van Dorn, who led a raid at Holly Springs, where the regiment was stationed.

The 101st Illinois Infantry Regiment was an infantry regiment that served in the Union Army during the American Civil War. Formed in Jacksonville, Illinois on September 2, 1862, the regiment spent their service on the western theater. The majority of the regiment had been captured during the Holly Springs Raid, before the remaining companies went on to fight in the Vicksburg Campaign.

The regiment was reunited with the companies captured during the raid, and participated in the Chattanooga-Ringgold Campaign, Atlanta Campaign, Sherman's March to the Sea before participating in the Carolinas Campaign. The regiment participated in the Grand Review of the Armies before they were mustered out on June 12, 1865.

== Service ==
=== Organization ===
The 101st Illinois Infantry was organized at Camp Duncan, Jacksonville, Illinois, and mustered into federal service on September 2, 1862. The regiment were all recruited from Morgan County, with Company G being recruited from Morgan and Sangamon Counties.

The companies of the regiment were recruited at:

- Company A - Morgan County
- Company B - Morgan County
- Company C - Morgan County
- Company D - Morgan County
- Company E - Morgan County
- Company F - Morgan County
- Company G - Morgan and Sangamon Counties
- Company H - Morgan County
- Company I - Morgan County
- Company K - Morgan County

=== Early service ===
The regiment remained in Camp Duncan for over a month, conducting drill and were being equipped for the field until October 6, when they were ordered to Cairo, Illinois, arriving there on October 7. The regiment performed garrison duty there for a month, during this period, disease ran rampant throughout the regiment due to bad weather, leading to many of the men being discharged or dying of disease, the regiment continued the assignment of garrison duty until November 26, when they moved to Davis' Mills, Mississippi, where they were attached to Loomis Brigade, Ross's Division of the Army of the Tennessee.

=== Holly Springs Raid ===
On November 28, the regiment marched for two days, and arrived at Lumpkin's Mill on November 30, stationed there until December 3, when they were ordered to Holly Springs, Mississippi, to perform provost and garrison duties.

While the rest of the regiment was at Holly Springs, Company A was detached to send Confederate prisoners to Cairo, Illinois.

During the Holly Springs raid, the remaining companies of A, (Note: Only the sick men) B, C, D, E, F, G, were divided into small squads, conducting provost duty, which were too small to repel the overwhelming numbers Van Dorn had, the town was captured, with this, Companies A, B, C, E, F and I were captured and paroled, while the remaining Companies of D, G, H and K, who were stationed along the Mississippi Central Railroad, fell back to Cold Water, where they repelled Van Dorn's attack there alongside the 19th Illinois Infantry Regiment.

=== Consolidation and operations against Vicksburg ===
After the raid, the remaining four companies, A, D, G, H and K were consolidated into a battalion, and was assigned to scouting operations over Tennessee until February 1863, when they were reunited with Company A, under Captain Lesage, at Memphis, Tennessee, where Lesage took command of the battalion.

In early March, the battalion was ordered to Vicksburg, where it was fractured into several companies, assigned to various duties, with each company spending the following months conducting scouting operations, skirmishes and expeditions. While operating against Vicksburg, the regiment was equipped with the Springfield Model 1842, alongside 69. and 72. caliber Austrian, Prussian, French smoothbore muskets, and after the surrender of Vicksburg, the regiment alongside twenty others exchanged their muskets with captured Confederate Enfield Rifled muskets and other weapons. On June 7, Companies A, B, C, E, F and I that were paroled in Holly Springs were exchanged and was sent to New Madrid, Missouri on July 11, then to Columbus, Kentucky, conducting scouting operations and participating in skirmishes until August 25, when they were reunited with Companies A, D, G, H and K at Union City, Tennessee.

=== Chattanooga-Ringgold Campaign ===
On September 24, the regiment was transferred to the Department of the Cumberland, and was temporarily attached to the 1st Brigade, 3rd Division of XI Corps on October 27. The next day, the Corps arrived at Lookout Valley, the regiment participated in the Battle of Wauhatchie, suffering no fatalities. After the engagement, the regiment spent nearly a month stationed at the Valley, while being exposed to daily artillery fire from Lookout Mountain, losing 1 killed and 1 wounded.

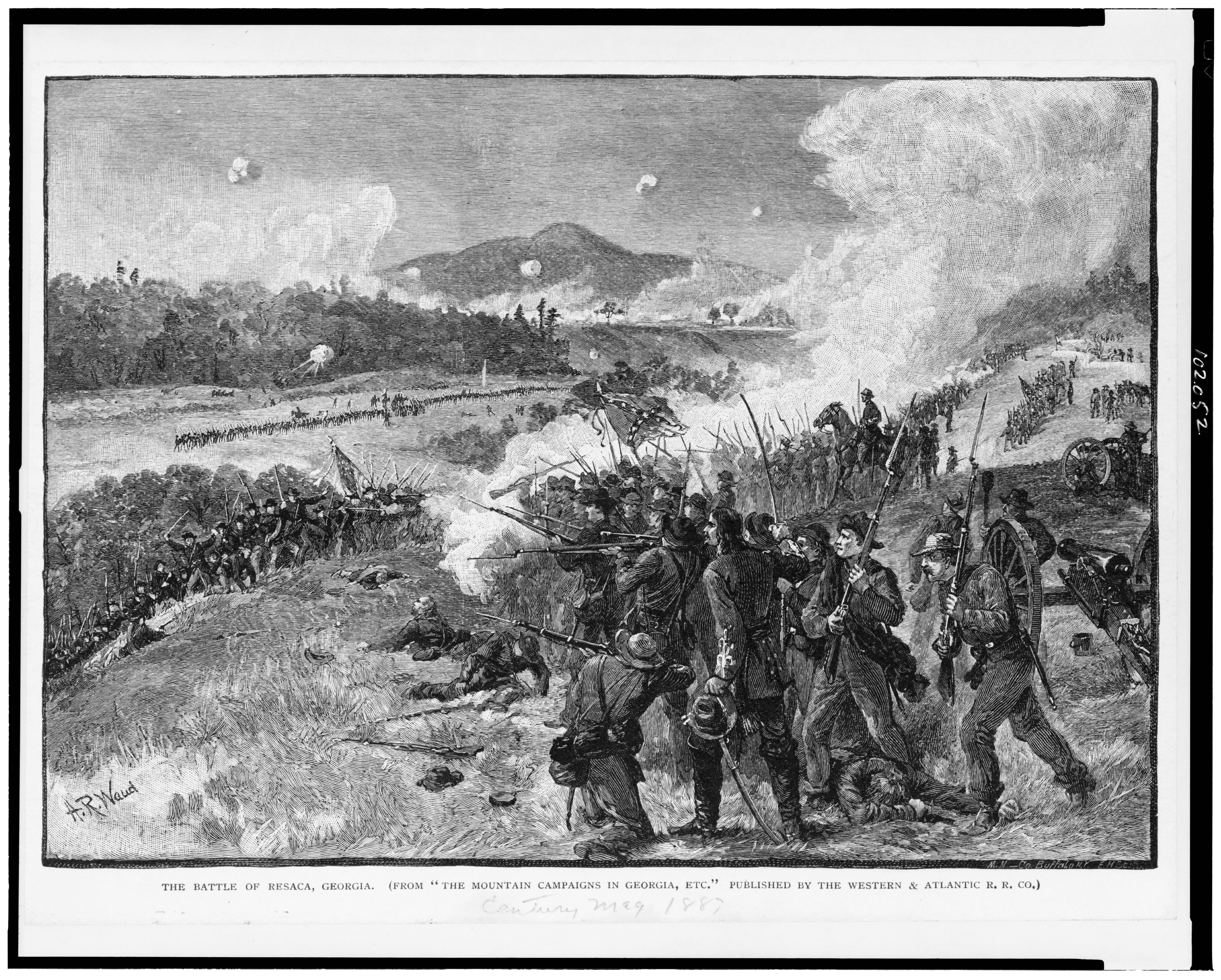
The Battle of Resaca, Georgia by Alfred R. Waud

On November 22, the regiment was ordered to Chattanooga, and subsequently participated in the Battle of Missionary Ridge on November 25, losing one man killed. After the battle, the regiment was immediately sent relieve the Union garrison at Knoxville, with many of the men having to march barefoot over frozen ground and sharp rocks. The regiment returned to Lookout Valley on December 17.

=== Battle of Resaca ===
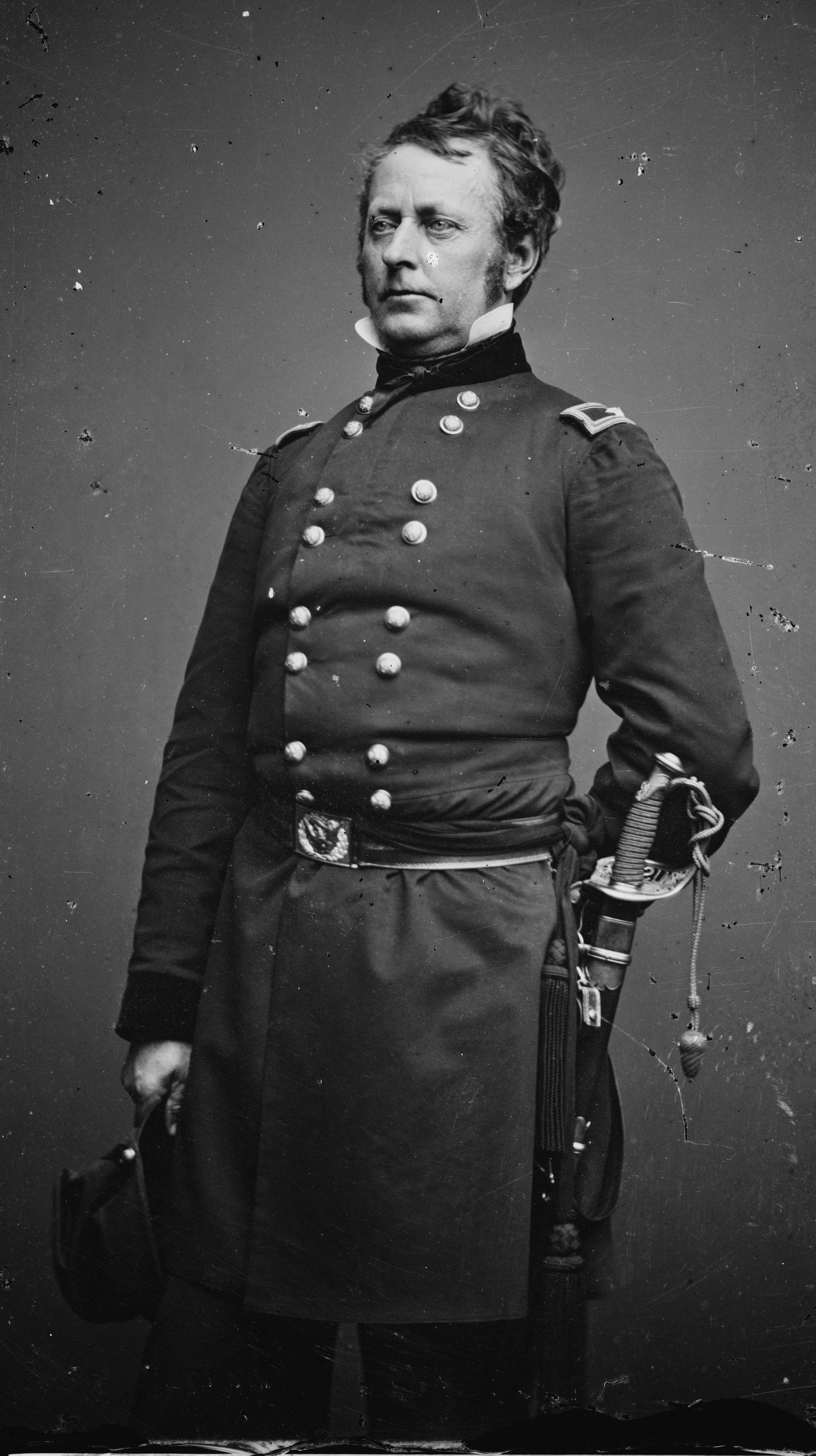
Major General Joseph Hooker

They remained in the valley for a few days replenishing before being sent to work on building corduroy roads. On January 1, 1864, the regiment was sent to Kelly's Ferry, relieving the 16th Illinois, which was sent on a veteran furlough. The regiment was stationed at Kelly's Ferry until January 31, when they were ordered to Bridgeport, remaining there until May 2, when it was sent to the front, where the regiment was assigned to the 3rd Brigade (Commanded by Col. James S. Robinson), 1st Division (Commanded by Brigadier General Alpheus S. Williams of XX Corps (Major General Joseph Hooker.)

On May 6, the regiment had reached Taylor's Ridge, and crossed the river the next day. On May 10, the regiment marched to Snake Creek Gap, arriving there on May 11, before being stationed there for two days until May 13, when they had to march group the gap to participate in the Battle of Resaca, but were held in reserve during May 14 until 3 P.M., when they double-quicked for the Union left.

During the engagement, the regiment was ordered to capture a hill in front of them, in which they captured it, leading to Major General Hooker to shout "Go in, my Illinois boys!" The next afternoon, the regiment was ordered forward, before being attacked by Confederate forces at 4 o-clock. During the engagement, the regiment lost over 7 men killed and mortally wounded and 40 wounded.

=== Atlanta Campaign and Sherman's March to the Sea ===
After the battle, the regiment participated in the Battle of Cassville on May 19, New Hope Church, where Adjutant Padgett, Lieutenant Hardin and Belt, who would later die of his wounds, Kennesaw, Pine Mountains, and Kolb's Farm, where it supported Battery I, 1st New York Light Artillery. After the Confederates left Kennesaw Mountain, the regiment participated in the pursuit of the Confederate forces. On July 6, the regiment took positions on Chattahoochie Heights, where they were stationed there for eleven days.

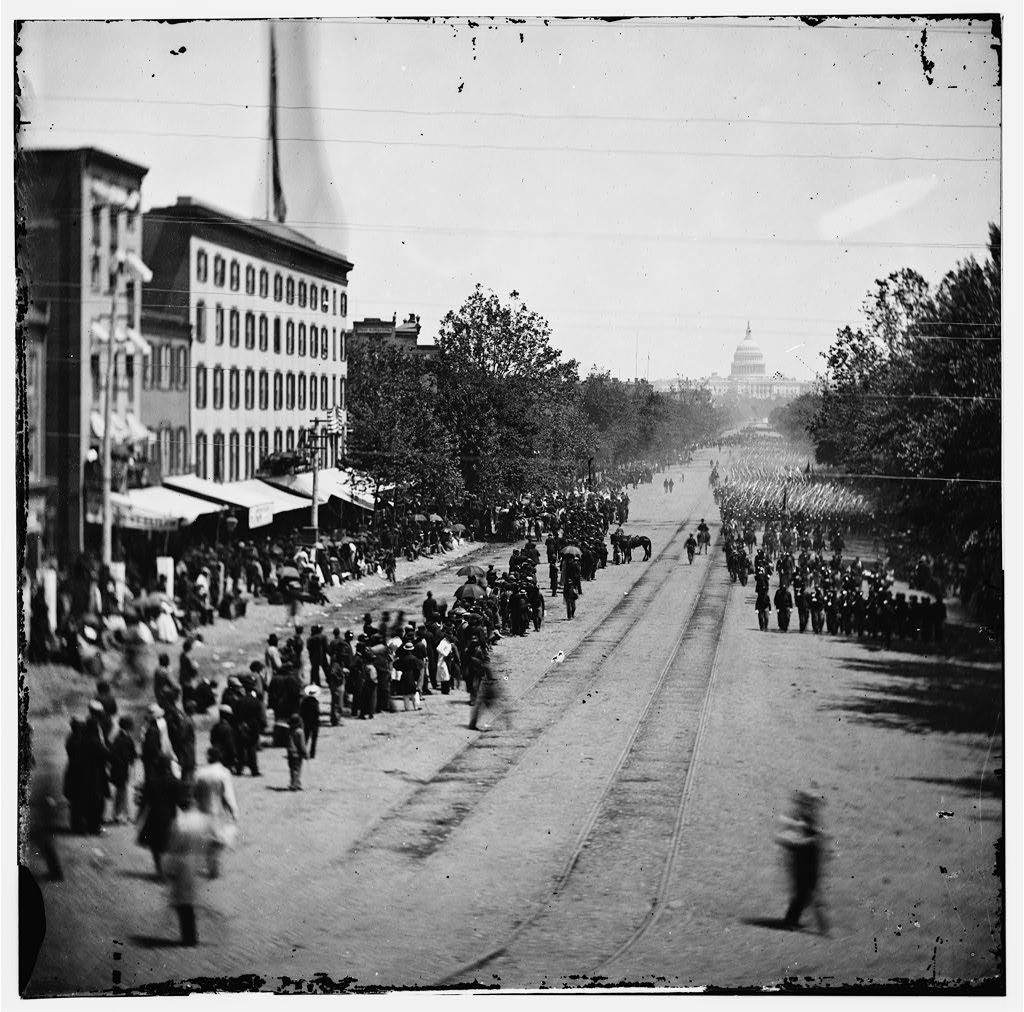
Union infantry passing through Pennsylvania Avenue

On July 20, the regiment participated in the Battle of Peachtree Creek, where it formed line under Confederate fire. the regiment subsequently held the Confederates at bay, before they were repulsed by 8 P.M. The regiment lost 5 killed and 35 wounded, among the killed was Captain Thomas B. Woof. By the morning of July 21, the regiment reported that they had over 120 men, with them previously having over 365 men when they left Bridgeport.

On July 22, the regiment took positions in front of Atlanta, Georgia, and supported Battery I, 1st New York Light Artillery, remaining there until August 25, when they were ordered to the Chattahoochie Bridge, for guard duty. On September 2, the regiment was sent on a reconnaissance operation and would become the first regiment to enter Atlanta after its fall.

On November 15, the regiment participated in the Sherman's March to the Sea, acting as either an advance guard, dispersing Confederate cavalry or as rear guard, pulling out wagons from the mud. On December 22, 1864, the regiment reached Savannah.

=== Carolinas Campaign and mustering out ===
On January 17, 1865, the regiment crossed into South Carolina, during which, Maj. Napoleon B. Brown resigned. The regiment participated in the Carolinas Campaign, fighting at Averasborough and Bentonville, only losing 1 man wounded. By March 24 to April 13, it marched through Goldsboro and Raleigh, where it remained until the surrender of Joseph E. Johnston's army at Bennett Place.

On May 24, the regiment participated in the Grand Review of the Armies, and subsequently were quartered at Bladensburg until June 1865.

The regiment was mustered out on June 7, 1865, with 385 men, and discharged at Springfield, Illinois, on June 21, 1865.

== Organizational affiliations, detailed service and armaments ==
During its service, the regiment was assigned to various larger formations, such as:

- Attached to District of Cairo, Dept. of the Tennessee, to November, 1862
- 2nd Brigade, 4th Division, Right Wing 13th Army Corps (Old), Dept. of the Tennessee, to December, 1862
- 2nd Brigade, 4th Division, 17th Army Corps, to January, 1863
- 2nd Brigade, 4th Division, 16th Army Corps, January, 1863
- District of Memphis, Tenn., 16th Army Corps, to March, 1863.
- Ram Fleet, Mississippi Squadron, to June, 1863
- District of Columbus, Ky., 6th Division, 16th Army Corps, to July, 1863
- 1st Brigade, 6th Division, 16th Army Corps, to October, 1863
- 1st Brigade, 3rd Division, 11th Army Corps
- Army of the Cumberland, to April, 1864
- 3rd Brigade, 1st Division, 20th Army Corps, Army of the Cumberland and Army of Georgia, to June, 1865.

=== Detailed service ===
==== 1862 ====
- Organized at Jacksonville, Ill., and mustered in September 2, 1862.
- Moved to Cairo, Ill., October 6–7, 1862.
- Duty at Cairo, Ill., October 7, to November 26, 1862.
- Moved to Columbus, Ky., thence to Davis Mills, Miss., November 26–27.
- Grant's Central Mississippi Campaign.
- March to Lumpkin's Mills, thence to Holly Springs, Miss., November 28-December 3
- Provost and garrison duty there till December 20.
- Action and capture at Holly Springs, Miss., December 20, 1862. Companies "B," "C," "E," "F" and "I" captured, paroled and sent to Memphis, Tenn., thence to Benton Barracks, Mo., and duty there as paroled prisoners of war till June, 1863.
- Companies "D," "G," "H," "I" and "K" on duty guarding railroad, fell back to Coldwater, December 20, 1862, and assisted in repulse of Van Dorn's attack December 20.

==== 1863 ====
- Companies "D," "G," "H" and "K" formed temporarily into a Battalion and attached to 14th Illinois Infantry till March, 1863.
- Operations on Mississippi Central Railroad and scouting till February, 1863.
- At Memphis till March.
- Company "A" rejoined at Memphis February, 1863. Ordered to Vicksburg, Miss., March, 1863. Battalion broken up.
- Company "K" assigned as provost guard at General Grant's headquarters; Company "G" to ram "Switzerland;" Company "D" to "Battler" and "Cricket;" Company "A" to "General Bragg;" Company "H" to "Lafayette," so serving till September, 1863.
- Rejoined Regiment at Union City, Tenn. Regiment exchanged June 7, 1863
- Moved to New Madrid, Mo., and duty there till July 11
- Moved to Columbus, Ky., and duty there scouting till August
- At Union City, Tenn., August 25 to September 24.
- Moved to Louisville, Ky., September 24–27, thence to Bridgeport, Ala., September 30-October 2, and duty there till October 27.
- Reopening Tennessee River October 27–29
- Battle of Wauhatchie, Tenn., October 28–29
- Duty in Lookout Valley till November 23
- Chattanooga-Ringgold Campaign November 23–27
- Orchard Knob November 23.
- Tunnel Hill November 24–25.
- Mission Ridge November 25.
- Pursuit to Cleveland November 26–27.
- March to relief of Knoxville, Tenn., November 28-December 17.
- At Whiteside till May, 1864.

==== 1864 ====
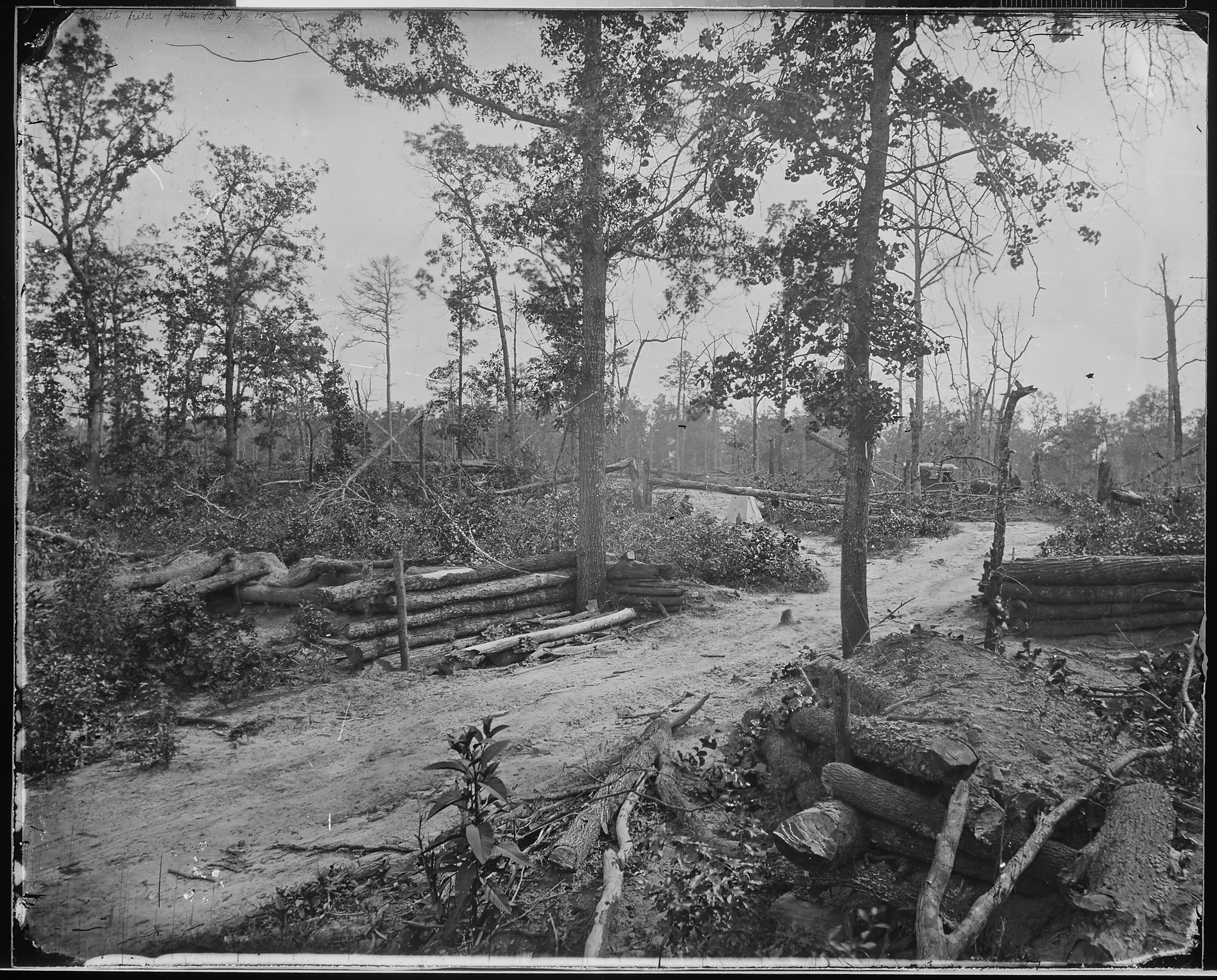
Confederate entrenchments at New Hope Church

- Atlanta (Ga.) Campaign May 3-September 8
- Demonstration on Rocky Faced Ridge May 8–11.
- Battle of Resaca May 14–15.
- Near Cassville May 19. New Hope Church May 25.
- Operations on line of Pumpkin Vine Creek and battles about Dallas, New Hope Church and Allatoona Hills May 25-June 5.
- Operations about Marietta and against Kenesaw Mountain June 10-July 2.
- Pine Hill June 11–14.
- Lost Mountain June 15–17.
- Gilgal or Gulgotha Church June 15
- Muddy Creek June 17
- Noyes Creek June 19
- Kolb's Farm June 22.
- Assault on Kenesaw June 27
- Ruff's Station, Smyrna Camp Ground, July 4.
- Chattahoochie River July 6–17.
- Peach Tree Creek July 19–20.
- Siege of Atlanta July 22-August 25.
- Operations at Chattahoochie River Bridge August 26-September 2.
- Occupation of Atlanta September 2-November 15.
- Expedition from Atianta to Tuckum's Cross Roads October 26–29.
- March to the sea November 15-December 10.
- Near Sandersville November 26.
- Montieth Swamp December 9.
- Siege of Savannah December 10–21.

==== 1865 ====
- Campaign of the Carolinas January to April, 1865.
- Averysboro, Taylor's Hole Creek, N. C., March 16. Battle of Bentonville March 19–21.
- Occupation of Goldsboro March 24.
- Advance on Raleigh April 10–14.
- Occupation of Raleigh April 14.
- Bennett's House April 26.
- Surrender of Johnston and his army. March to Washington, D. C., via Richmond, Va., April 29-May 19.
- Grand Review May 24.
- Mustered out June 7 and discharged at Springfield, Ill., June 21, 1865.

== Total strength and casualties ==
The regiment suffered 3 officers and 47 enlisted men who were killed in action or who died of their wounds and 1 officer and 118 enlisted men who died of disease, for a total of 169 fatalities.

== Commanders ==
- Colonel Charles H. Fox – Resigned May 1, 1864.
- Lieutenant Colonel John B. Lesage – Mustered out with the regiment.
- Major Napoleon B. Brown – Resigned January 17, 1865
- Adjutant Harrison O. Cassell - Resigned February 2, 1863

== See also ==
- List of Illinois Civil War Units
- Illinois in the American Civil War
