= Miltonvale, Kansas =

City in Cloud County, Kansas

- City
- Location within Cloud County and Kansas

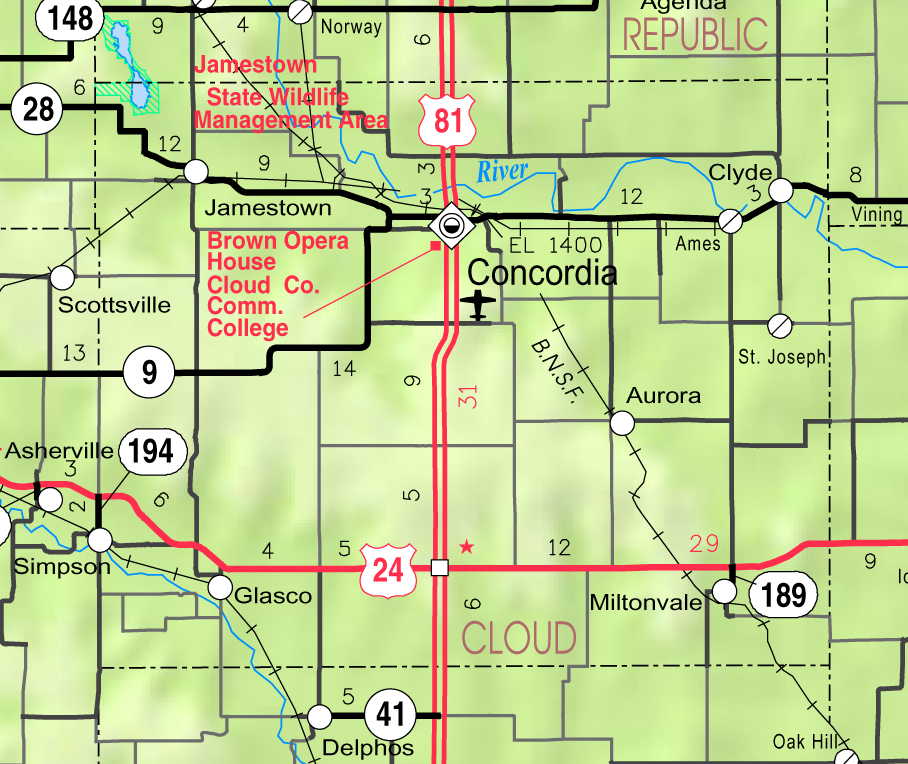
- KDOT map of Cloud County (legend)
- Coordinates: 39°20′58″N 97°27′08″W
- Country: United States
- State: Kansas
- County: Cloud
- Founded: 1881
- Incorporated: 1883
- Named for: Milton Tootle

Area
  - Total: 0.76 sq mi (1.97 km^{2})
  - Land: 0.76 sq mi (1.97 km^{2})
  - Water: 0 sq mi (0.00 km^{2})
- Elevation: 1,401 ft (427 m)

Population (2020)
  - Total: 440
  - Density: 580/sq mi (220/km^{2})
- Time zone: UTC-6 (CST)
  - Summer (DST): UTC-5 (CDT)
- ZIP Code: 67466
- Area code: 785
- FIPS code: 20-46950
- GNIS ID: 2395337
- Website: miltonvaleks.com

Miltonvale is a city in Cloud County, Kansas, United States. As of the 2020 census, the population of the city was 440.

== History ==
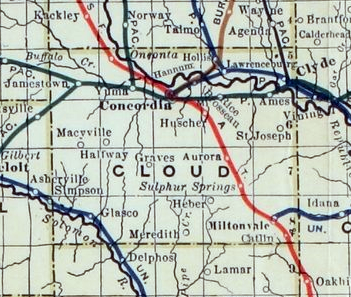
1915 railroad map of Cloud County

Miltonvale was founded on December 1, 1881. The town got its start following construction of a narrow gauge railway through the neighborhood. It was named for Milton Tootle, a landowner.

In 1887, Atchison, Topeka and Santa Fe Railway built a branch line from Neva (three miles west of Strong City) through TBD to Superior, Nebraska. In 1996, the Atchison, Topeka and Santa Fe Railway merged with Burlington Northern Railroad and renamed to the current BNSF Railway. Most locals still refer to this railroad as the "Santa Fe".

From 1909 to 1972, Miltonvale was the home of Miltonvale Wesleyan College.

== Geography ==
According to the United States Census Bureau, the city has a total area of 0.76 square miles (1.97 km^{2}), all land.

=== Climate ===
The climate in this area is characterized by hot, humid summers and generally mild to cool winters. According to the Köppen Climate Classification system, Miltonvale has a humid subtropical climate, abbreviated "Cfa" on climate maps.

== Demographics ==
Historical population
Census	Pop.	Note	%±
1890	591		—
1900	396		−33.0%
1910	829		109.3%
1920	821		−1.0%
1930	814		−0.9%
1940	800		−1.7%
1950	911		13.9%
1960	814		−10.6%
1970	718		−11.8%
1980	588		−18.1%
1990	484		−17.7%
2000	523		8.1%
2010	539		3.1%
2020	440		−18.4%
U.S. Decennial Census

=== 2020 census ===
The 2020 United States census counted 440 people, 189 households, and 110 families in Miltonvale. The population density was 587.4 per square mile (226.8/km^{2}). There were 258 housing units at an average density of 344.5 per square mile (133.0/km^{2}). The racial makeup was 94.32% (415) white or European American (94.09% non-Hispanic white), 0.68% (3) black or African-American, 0.45% (2) Native American or Alaska Native, 0.0% (0) Asian, 0.0% (0) Pacific Islander or Native Hawaiian, 0.0% (0) from other races, and 4.55% (20) from two or more races. Hispanic or Latino of any race was 0.45% (2) of the population.

Of the 189 households, 27.5% had children under the age of 18; 43.4% were married couples living together; 25.9% had a female householder with no spouse or partner present. 37.0% of households consisted of individuals and 20.6% had someone living alone who was 65 years of age or older. The average household size was 2.6 and the average family size was 3.1. The percent of those with a bachelor's degree or higher was estimated to be 17.0% of the population.

27.3% of the population was under the age of 18, 6.1% from 18 to 24, 22.7% from 25 to 44, 24.3% from 45 to 64, and 19.5% who were 65 years of age or older. The median age was 41.3 years. For every 100 females, there were 106.6 males. For every 100 females ages 18 and older, there were 101.3 males.

The 2016–2020 5-year American Community Survey estimates show that the median household income was $45,625 (with a margin of error of +/- $13,752) and the median family income was $63,750 (+/- $24,791). Males had a median income of $34,844 (+/- $12,173) versus $25,046 (+/- $6,994) for females. The median income for those above 16 years old was $26,912 (+/- $5,527). Approximately, 9.9% of families and 9.8% of the population were below the poverty line, including 5.6% of those under the age of 18 and 5.1% of those ages 65 or over.

=== 2010 census ===
As of the census of 2010, there were 539 people, 219 households, and 136 families living in the city. The population density was 709.2 inhabitants per square mile (273.8/km^{2}). There were 262 housing units at an average density of 344.7 per square mile (133.1/km^{2}). The racial makeup of the city was 97.6% White, 0.2% Native American, 0.2% Asian, 0.6% from other races, and 1.5% from two or more races. Hispanic or Latino of any race were 1.7% of the population.

There were 219 households, of which 35.2% had children under the age of 18 living with them, 49.8% were married couples living together, 6.8% had a female householder with no husband present, 5.5% had a male householder with no wife present, and 37.9% were non-families. 34.7% of all households were made up of individuals, and 20.1% had someone living alone who was 65 years of age or older. The average household size was 2.46 and the average family size was 3.16.

The median age in the city was 36.8 years. 29.7% of residents were under the age of 18; 5.9% were between the ages of 18 and 24; 21.6% were from 25 to 44; 23.1% were from 45 to 64; and 19.9% were 65 years of age or older. The gender makeup of the city was 49.5% male and 50.5% female.

== Education ==
The community is served by Southern Cloud USD 334 public school district.

The Miltonvale Pirates won the Kansas State High School class 1A volleyball championship in 1978.

Former home to Miltonvale Wesleyan College from 1909 to 1972.

== Notable people ==
- Jim Garlow, evangelical pastor
- Nellie Ross, first woman governor in the United States (Wyoming)
- Patrice Wymore, vaudeville and film actress; third wife of Errol Flynn
