= Master of Divinity =

Professional and terminal graduate degree in the study of theology and pastoral studies

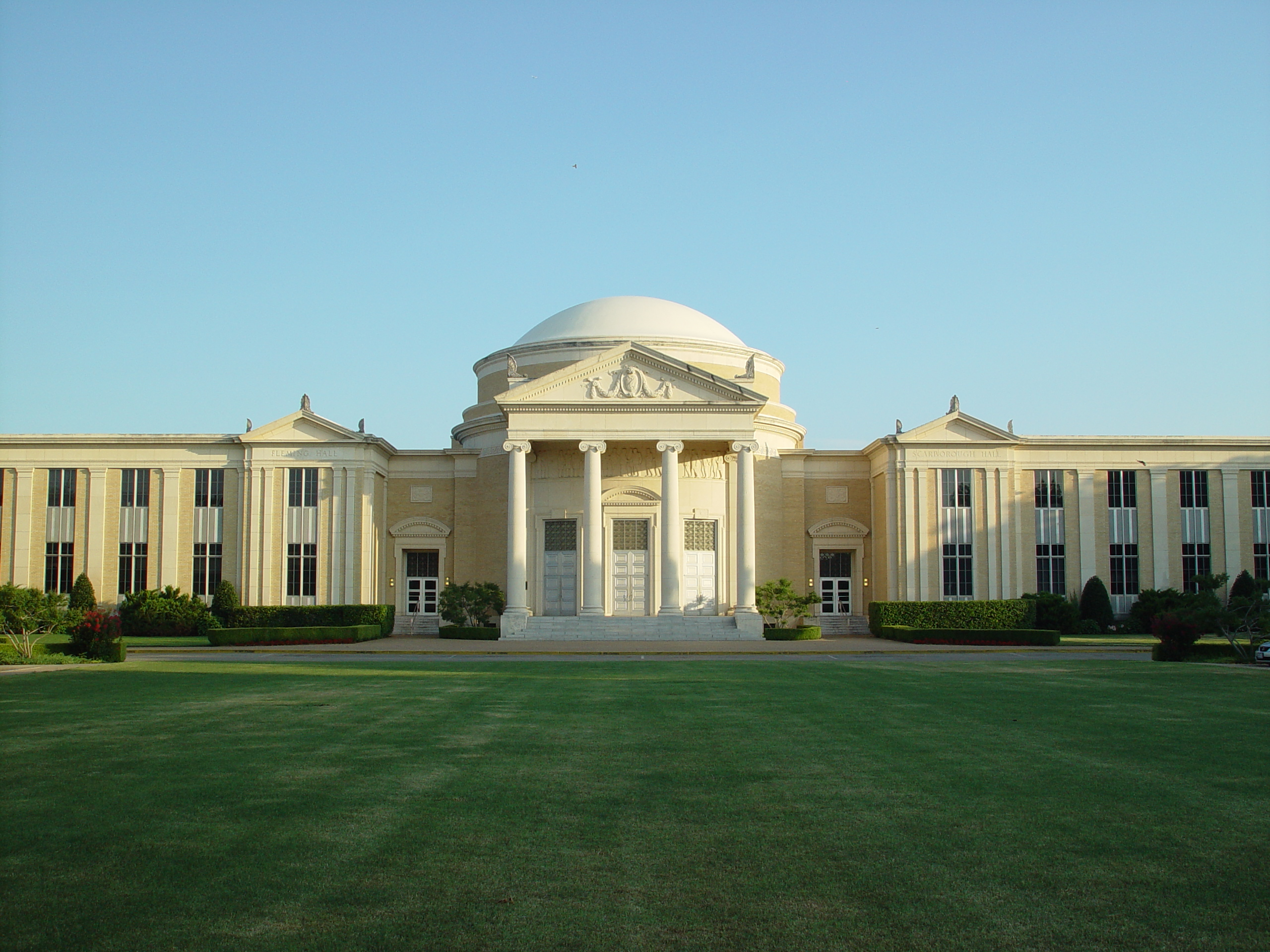
Southwestern has historically offered one of America's largest MDiv programs.

For graduate-level theological institutions, the Master of Divinity (MDiv, magister divinitatis in Latin) is the first professional degree of the pastoral profession in North America. It is the most common academic degree in seminaries and divinity schools (e.g. in 2014 nearly 44 percent of all US students in schools accredited by the Association of Theological Schools were enrolled in an MDiv program).

In many Christian denominations and in some other religions, the degree is the standard prerequisite for ordination or licensing to professional ministry. At accredited seminaries in the United States, this degree requires between 72 and 106 credit hours of study (72 being the minimum determined by academic accrediting agencies, and 106 being on the upper end of certain schools that wish to ensure a broader study of the related disciplines.) After the completion of the Master of Divinity degree, students can continue further and get their professional Doctor of Ministry degree.

== Overview ==
Christian MDiv programs generally include studies in Christian ministry and theology. In 1996, the Association of Theological Schools established the standard that all accredited MDiv programs should include the following four content areas: Religious Heritage, Cultural Context, Personal and Spiritual Formation, and Capacity for Ministerial and Public Leadership. Coursework usually includes studies in New Testament Greek, theology, philosophy, church history, pastoral theology, Hebrew Bible (Old Testament), and New Testament studies. The requirements for an MDiv take between three and four years, and include practical experience like most professional terminal degrees.

Many programs also contain courses in church growth, ecclesiology, evangelism, systematic theology, Christian education, liturgical studies, Latin, Hebrew, canon law, and patristics. The degree may or may not include a thesis.

The MDiv is a requirement for ordination in many denominations. For example, the United Methodist Church, one of the largest Protestant Christian denominations in the US, whose students in 2014 made up nine percent of all MDiv students enrolled in schools accredited by the Association of Theological Schools, requires candidates for ordination as elder to earn an MDiv and requires candidates for ordination as deacon to earn either an MDiv or a master's degree in another field with additional theological studies.

== History ==
"The formal preparation of clergy began in the 16th century when the Roman Catholic Church created a new environment for the formation of priests called the seminary, which literally means “seedbed.” At the Council of Trent (1545–1563), the Roman Catholic Church officially adopted the term for a place where spiritual leaders would be developed. As education grew in Roman Catholic seminaries, they were later developed by Protestant denominations through universities. When Harvard College was founded in 1636, it was the first seminary prototype in North America. The goal of Puritan theological education at Harvard was to produce a pastor-theologian, or “learned clergy.” This has remained the goal of seminaries to this day. Most of these universities offered a bachelor of divinity degree as the primary degree for clergy preparation. In 1808, the first seminary to prepare Congregationalist clergy was the Andover Theological Seminary. Andover’s founders fashioned the essential seminary experience for the next two centuries, which included a professional specialized faculty and a sizeable library. The 3-year curriculum focused on three areas of study: (1) the Bible, (2) church history, and (3) theology. In 1809, the Presbyterians in New Jersey established Princeton Seminary."

In 2022, The Association of Theological Schools reported that the Master of Divinity degree has seen a steady decline in enrollment. In comparison to 2021, the percentage dropped by 4% and declined 9% since 2018. While the percentage of enrollment in Theological Seminaries have Master of Divinity degrees as the plurality enrollment, the decline from 43% to 35% in a decade indicate a concern for professionals in the field.

== Contemporary usage ==
The Master of Divinity has replaced the Bachelor of Divinity in most United States seminaries as the first professional degree, since the former title implied in the American academic system that it was on a par with a Bachelor of Arts or other basic undergraduate education even though a bachelor's degree previously was and remains a prerequisite for entrance into graduate divinity programs. The Commission on Accrediting of the Association of Theological Schools in the United States and Canada accredits most Christian schools in North America and approves the degree programs they offer, including the MDiv.

The MDiv is a significantly more extensive program than most taught (as opposed to research-based) master's degrees. In the United States, the degree typically consists of approximately 90 semester hours, as opposed to the 30 to 48 semester hours typical of most master's degrees, or the approximately 60 semester hours typical of mental health counseling or entry-level social work master's degrees. Ordination in most mainline Protestant denominations and the Roman Catholic Church thus requires seven or eight years of education past high school: the first four in undergraduate studies leading to a bachelor's degree (which may or may not be in a related field) and then three or four years of seminary or divinity school education leading to the MDiv.

The MDiv stands in contrast to the Master of Arts (MA) in theology and Master of Theological Studies (MTS), the usual academic degrees in the subject (which tend not to include "pastoral" or "practical" courses), and the Bachelor of Sacred Theology (STB), Licentiate in Sacred Theology (STL), Master of Theology (MTh/ThM), Master of Sacred Theology (STM), and Master of Religion (MRel), which are also academic degrees. Schools with Pontifical faculties in North America often award both the MDiv and STB at the same time after a three-year period of graduate studies.

== Enrollment differences between genders ==
In 2014, women made up approximately 53 percent of all students enrolled in ministerial non-MDiv degree programs at US schools accredited by the Association of Theological Schools. However, women constituted only approximately 29 percent of all MDiv students in the same schools in that year. The group with the most parity in MDiv enrollment numbers between men and women at those schools in that time period were African-American students, among whom enrollment numbers were almost equal between genders.

== Cost ==
For the 2022–2023 academic year, the average cost per year for MDiv tuition and fees at a school accredited by the Association of Theological Schools was $16,488.67 in the United States and $10,765.50 in Canada.

== See also ==
- Doctor of Divinity
