= Miltonvale Wesleyan College =

Former educational institution in the United States

Coordinates: 39.3462°N 97.4597°W

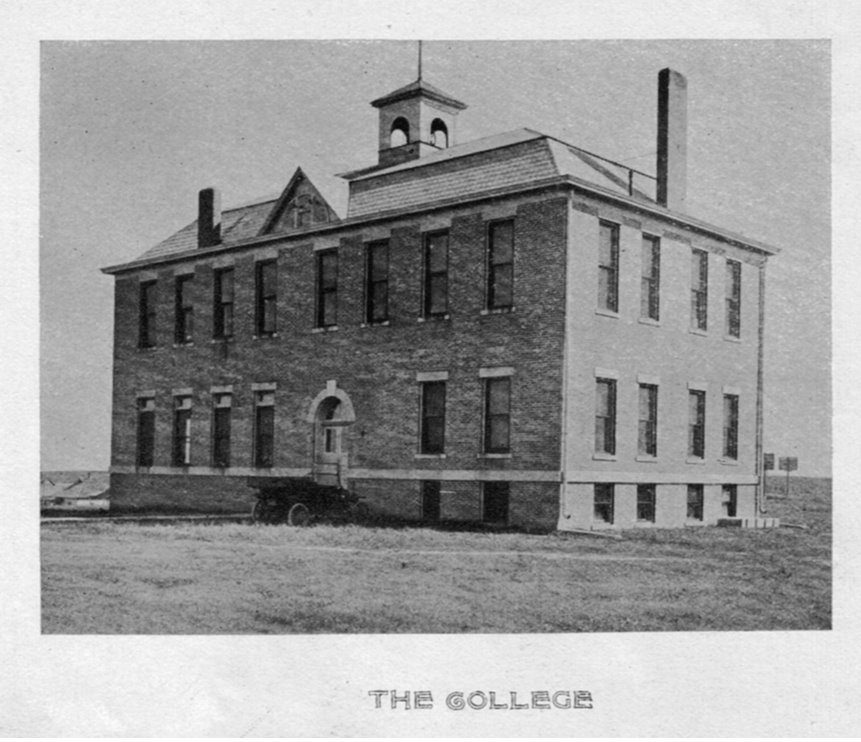
Miltonvale College, 1915

Miltonvale Wesleyan College (sometimes called "Miltonvale College") was a two-year college located in Miltonvale, Kansas and was operated by the Wesleyan Church. The school began operation in 1909 under Rev. Silas W. Bond and ceased operation in 1972, when the school merged with Bartlesville Wesleyan College—later to become a part of Oklahoma Wesleyan University.

== Alumni ==
- Orval Butcher (1917–2010), founding pastor of Skyline Church in La Mesa, California
- Jim Garlow, third pastor of the same Skyline Church.
