= Hagaman (surname) =

Hagaman is a surname. Notable people with the surname include:

- Allen Hagaman, sole ground casualty of the Hindenburg disaster
- Earl Hagaman (1925–2017), American-born New Zealand hotel operator
- Frank L. Hagaman (1894–1966), American lawyer and politician
- James Manney Hagaman (1830–1904), American lawyer, land agent, newspaper editor and city founder
