= Tom Brosius =

American track and field athlete (1949–2019)

- Tom Brosius in later years, playing guitar.

Personal information
- Full name: Thomas Alan Brosius
- Nickname: "Ferocious" Brosius
- Born: December 16, 1949 Takoma Park, Maryland, United States
- Died: January 11, 2019 (aged 69) Manhattan, Kansas
- Education: Kansas State University
- Spouse: Karen Brosius
- Other interests: Music, aviation

Sport
- Sport: track and field, college football
- Event(s): shot put, discus
- University team: Kansas State University
- League: Big 8 Conference

Thomas Alan "Ferocious" Brosius (December 16, 1949 – January 11, 2019) was a track and field athlete. He was declared an "All-American" at Kansas State University in the shot put and discus events for the 1972 season, and as of his death in 2019, still holds the Maryland all class high school state record in the shot put at 64' 6 1/2" set May 25, 1968. He also held the state discus record at 184' 10" for 31 years until it was broken in 1999.

After graduating from Springbrook High School in 1968, he went to Kansas State University on a football and track scholarship. As a college track and field athlete at Kansas State, he won the Big 8 Conference indoor shot put with a distance of 64 feet 3 1/2 inches, a throw that was the best in the nation at the college level that year. Brosius competed in both the Shot Put and Discus at outdoor meets, winning the Big 8 Conference twice in the Shot Put and once in Discus. While at Kansas State, he also played football for the Wildcats.

He later coached at Pleasanton High School, Pleasanton, Kansas, Concordia Junior-Senior High School and Cloud County Community College (where he was also a certified flight instructor) in Concordia, Kansas, and coached at Manhattan High School in Manhattan, Kansas until his death on January 11, 2019.

== See also ==
- List of Kansas State University people
- List of people from Cloud County, Kansas
