= Brown Grand Theatre =

- U.S. National Register of Historic Places
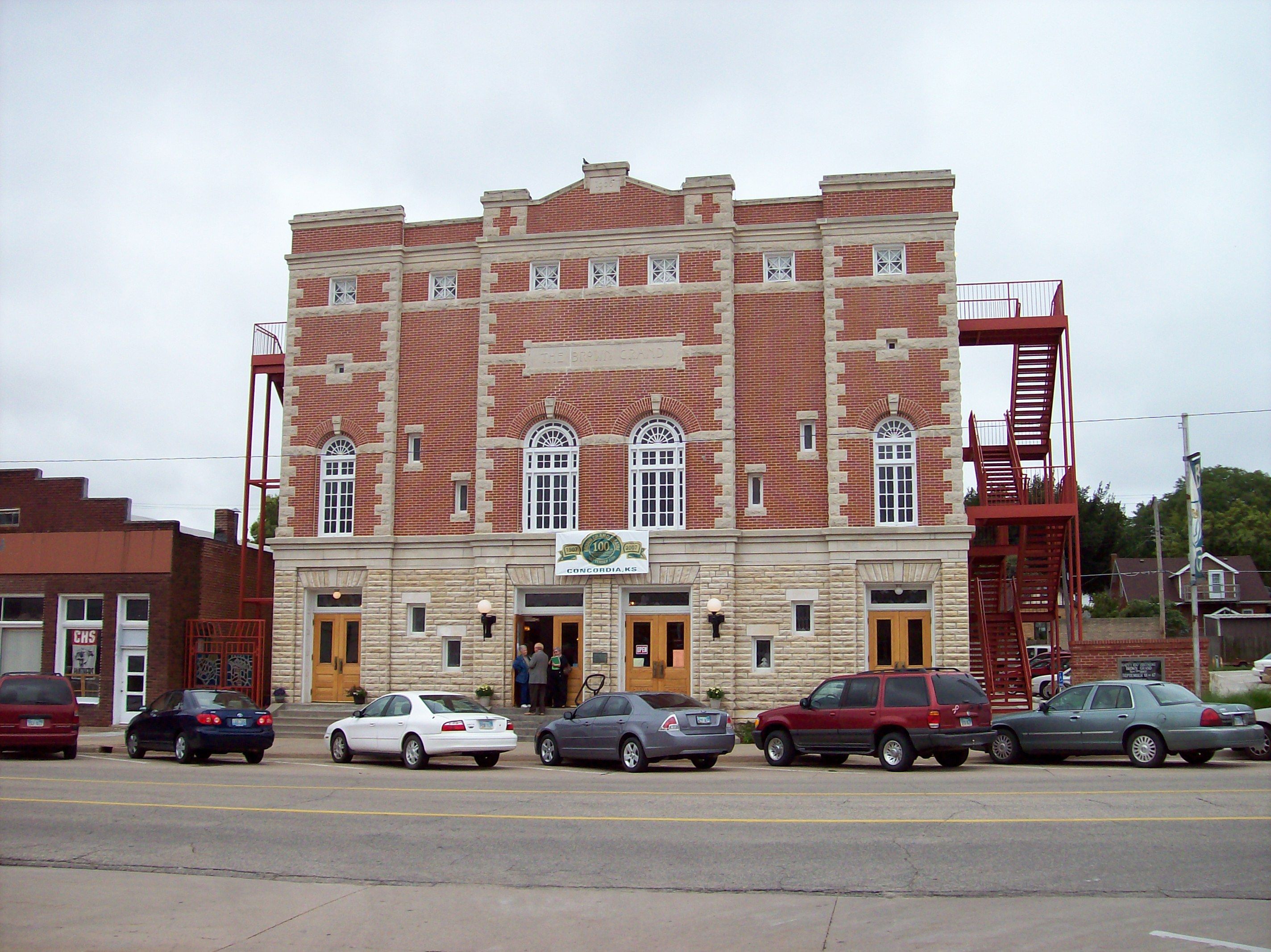
- The Brown Grand Theatre, 2007

- Location within Kansas Location within the United States
- Location: 310 W. 6th St. Concordia, Kansas
- Coordinates: 39°34′17″N 97°39′49″W
- Built: 1907
- Architect: Carl Boller and W.T. Short
- NRHP reference No.: 73000747
- Added to NRHP: July 26, 1973

The Brown Grand Theatre is a community-based historical theatre located in Concordia, Kansas and is listed on the National Register of Historic Places. The theatre has been called "the most elegant theater between Kansas City and Denver" and to this day plays host to many popular events in the region.

== Construction ==
In November 1905, Concordia resident Colonel Napoleon Bonaparte Brown announced to the townspeople his plans to build a fully outfitted opera house for Concordia. Renowned Kansas City theatre architect Carl Boller was hired to prepare the design drawings and the blueprints.

The construction of the theatre was under the direction of Brown's son, Earl Van Dom Brown. Young Earl researched and gathered ideas by touring more than thirty opera houses in Kansas and Missouri. Native Concordian W.T. Short (already known for his work on the Brown family home Brownstone Hall and other buildings in the area) was hired as the construction supervisor. Ground breaking ceremonies took place on April 3, 1906.

The Brown Grand Theatre nears completion, circa 1907

=== Opening night ===
At its completion, The Brown Grand Theatre stood sixty-feet high and spanned one-hundred-twenty feet in length. Renaissance in style and overall design, the $40,000 structure became a priceless jewel amid rare aesthetic riches in a small town in start of the 20th century mid-America. The formal opening of the Brown Grand Theatre took place September 17, 1907 with the production The Vanderbilt Cup (a comedy set against the backdrop of the auto racing trophy Vanderbilt Cup.

"The firemen who were at the doors were in full uniform and the ushers at the door wore white gloves. I'll tell you, that night society sort of quivered. It was all beautiful . . . yes it was." --Carl "Punch" Rogers who was in attendance on opening night.

The Motion Picture Years

=== Early years ===
During the next four years, the theater prospered until 1910, when N.B. Brown died. Four months later, his popular son Earl died. According to theater lore, Earl's ghost haunts the theater, especially during the "opening" season. The theatre operated under various management until 1925 when it was sold to the Concordia Amusement Company.

=== Motion Picture years ===
From 1925 to 1974, the Brown Grand was converted to show silent pictures and later talking pictures. The theater was remodeled several times (including air conditioning and concessions) to bring the theater more in line with the times.

The last movie to be shown at the Brown Grand was the world premiere of The Devil and LeRoy Bassett which was written and directed by Robert E. Pearson, a native of Concordia. Soon after, the theater underwent extensive restoration led by grassroots community efforts.

== Restoration ==
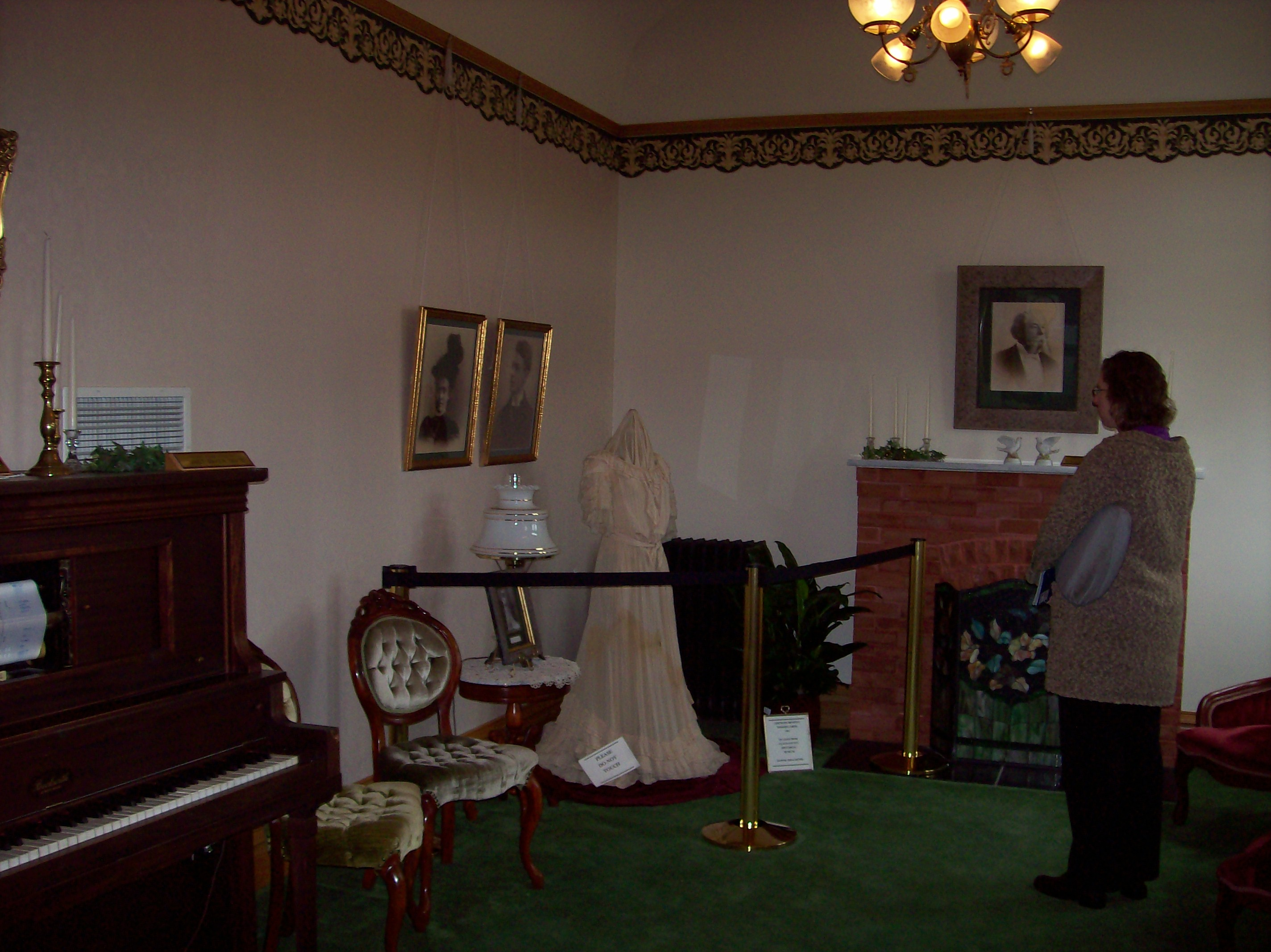
The restored "Ladies Parlor" at the Brown Grand Theatre

Restoration was completed in 1980. The theatre was returned to its original 1907 splendor with 650 seats. The Brown Grand Theatre now serves as a tourist attraction and performing arts / community center for Concordia and North Central Kansas.

Restoration included replacement seats, restoration of all walls and artistic work, updating of lighting system, addition of air conditioning, and many other enhancements. The restoration project has put the theatre today to be unique among theatres.

On September 17, 2007, the Brown Grand celebrated its 100th birthday with community events lasting over several days. The event coincided with the opening of the National Orphan Train Museum also in Concordia.

== Drop curtain ==
=== Original ===
On opening night in 1907, Earl Brown unveiled a drop curtain reproduction of a Horace Vernet painting. The curtain, entitled Napoleon at Austerlitz, was presented as a gift to Colonel Brown from his son in recognition of his father's contribution to the community and to the Brown Grand Theatre.

The original curtain still hangs above the stage but saw little use during the theatre's motion picture years. A 1967 tornado caused extensive water damage to the roof over the stage. The rain that accompanied the tornado permanently stained and streaked the already faded and brittle painting.

Restored drop curtain, "Napoleon at Austerlitz"

=== Replacement ===
Taking an extreme interest in the Napoleon curtain, Marion Cook (a member of the Brown Grand Board of Directors at the time) donated a new replacement drop curtain. The new curtain was painted by Twin City Scenic Company of Minneapolis, Minnesota—the same firm that had painted the original.

For the artistic work on the drop, sought-after scenic painter Robert Braun was hired to do the Napoleon battle scene, and Michael Russell, president of the company, came out of retirement to paint the bordering green draperies and gold and bronze frame around the picture.

The two artists requested a color photograph of the original Vernet work Battle of Wagram which hangs in the Hall of Battles in the Palace of Versailles near Paris.

== See also ==
- National Register of Historic Places listings in Cloud County, Kansas
