= Jim Garlow =

American Evangelical pastor

Jim Garlow is the former Senior Pastor of Skyline Church located in La Mesa, California, a suburb of San Diego. Garlow is often cited as an evangelical leader in the political arena, quoted on issues such as the 2012 Republican presidential primary. He is a leader in the "pulpit freedom" movement, which insists that pastors should be free to carry out political advocacy from the pulpit in defiance of Internal Revenue Service regulations, as well as a leader in the New Apostolic Reformation movement.

== Political activities ==
In 2008, Garlow and Skyline Church were noted for their leading role in organizing conservative religious groups to support California Proposition 8, which intended to ban same sex marriage in California.

In 2010, Garlow was appointed by former Speaker of the House Newt Gingrich as chairman of Renewing American Leadership, a non-profit organization he created after he left Congress. When accepting the leadership of Renewing American Leadership, Jim Garlow explained: "As noted on the organization's website, 'The mission of Renewing American Leadership is to preserve America's Judeo-Christian heritage by defending and promoting the three pillars of American civilization: freedom, faith and free markets. ReAL is dedicated to educating, organizing, training and mobilizing people of faith to renew American self-government and America's role in the world'." Cited on the website is a scriptural question: "When the foundations are being destroyed, what can the righteous do?" (Psalm 11:3, NIV) Garlow addressed the issue of political partisan activity in his comments, expressing an opinion that he would be neither Democrat or Republican: "My hope is not in the Republican Party or the Democratic Party. My hope lies in God and his unchanging truth. Some may (wrongly and falsely) accuse me of doing this for a political party or even a person, but they will be so totally incorrect. Any candidate and any political party has value only so long as one is fully committed to scriptural integrity and biblical truth."

Garlow has been involved in work to sway public opinion on US foreign policy. Garlow criticized the president of Taiwan by praising President Donald Trump for changing US foreign policy by calling the president of Taiwan rather than the premiere of China, by saying: "However, while the fact that a US President Elect talked with a Taiwanese leader is a good thing, it is NOT good that it was THIS leader. President Tsai Ing-wen is the 'Hillary Clinton of Taiwan' – hellbent on destroying natural, orthodox, historic, tradition (biblical) marriage. Churches – that is, authentically biblical churches - are under severe attack. Legal challenges are underway. So – while it is good that the US recognizes Taiwan, it is NOT good to give President Tsai Ing-wen any credibility. We need to pray her out!"

Prior to the 2016 election, Garlow went on the campaign trail for Donald Trump. One appearance was on the WallBuilders Live! radio program. Garlow "told host Rick Green that any Christian who has prayed and decided that they cannot vote for Donald Trump needs to 'pray some more' because by refusing to vote for him, they are helping to elect 'Jezebel 2.0,' Hillary Clinton." Jezebel was a biblical figure who is reported to have led the people to abandon the worship of Yahweh and instead worship the deities Baal and Asherah. Garlow went on to explain that Christians who do not support Trump are comparable to those who failed to resist Nazism in Germany. "It's like the Christians in Germany who eventually knew what was happening to the Jews as they were being gassed," Garlow said. "They knew it and they stayed silent." History remembers people like Dietrich Bonhoeffer, Garlow said, but there is eternal shame on "all those silent Christians that didn't say anything about the Jews being killed [because] they had no guts, they had no courage, they had no boldness and they would not stand for truth."

== Message and beliefs ==
Garlow participating in a Washington A Man of Prayer event at the US Capitol with Republican Congresspeople, compared himself and the others present to a re-embodiment in their persons of the "Burning Bush". The Burning Bush is a reference in the Bible to God manifesting himself to Moses on Mt. Sinai. Garlow continued by saying that their gathering was likely to change policy in Heaven as well as on Earth by declaring that future historians just might look back on the prayers that had been offered by dozens of members of Congress and conclude that they had caused a "shift in the heavenly realm" that led to nationwide revival. Garlow has previously claimed that his prayer gatherings led to the passage of California's Proposition 8, the anti-gay amendment that was later overturned by the courts.

Explaining his position to the far right of evangelicals in America, Garlow has suggested that the term evangelical should be abandoned by religious conservatives in favor of the term "authentically biblical Christians". He questioned whether liberal evangelicals truly believe in the Bible. "I would question whether or not everyone believes the Bible in the way they may have at one point," he said. "Just look at how they're capitulating on the definition of marriage and their view of homosexuality. There's a lot of capitulation, a lot of Neville Chamberlain evangelicals out there." He suggested that religious conservatives may have to "abandon" the term evangelical altogether and "coin a new phrase" like "ABC, authentically biblical Christians."

Since most evangelicals reject jointly working with, or combining forces with, The Church of Jesus Christ of Latter-day Saints, rejecting Mormonism as non-Christian, this led many to reject a rally in which Glenn Beck, who is a Mormon, had invited Mormon leaders to participate. Garlow has taken the position that working with Mormon leaders and church activities is appropriate and Christian. Garlow – who partnered with Mormons in California to help pass Proposition 8, the state's gay marriage ban, via ballot initiative in 2008 – is one of several high-profile evangelicals on the defensive about participating in Beck's rally, called Restoring Honor. The rally, which was held near the Lincoln Memorial on the 47th anniversary of Martin Luther King Jr.'s "I Have a Dream" speech, was headlined by Sarah Palin. Christian critics of the event have taken specific aim at some evangelicals' participation in a pre-rally event Friday at the Kennedy Center called Glenn Beck's Divine Destiny. Beck, who many evangelicals say is not a Christian because of his Mormon beliefs, said on his website that the Friday event "will help heal your soul". "Guided by uplifting music, nationally-known religious figures from all faiths will unite to deliver messages reminiscent to those given during the struggles of America's earliest days," his site says of the event. "Glenn Beck is being used by God – mightily," Garlow wrote in the memo, which was obtained by CNN. "The left loves to slam him and do so viscerally and often with vulgarities. Glenn is not perfect... But his expose on America's sins is stellar."

Garlow uses the name "Wesleyan" in his church's name. The name comes from the religious movement started by John Wesley, an Anglican cleric and theologian who founded Methodism. Wesley embraced the Arminian doctrines that dominated the Church of England at the time. Moving across Great Britain and Ireland, he helped form and organize small Christian groups that developed intensive and personal accountability, discipleship and religious instruction. He appointed itinerant, unordained evangelists to travel and preach as he did and to care for these groups of people. Under Wesley's direction, Methodists became leaders in many social issues of the day, including prison reform and the abolition of slavery. Wesley was a believer in lay leadership and lay preaching, appointing lay persons to minister to small groups of like believers. Methodism is known for its emphasis on caring for the poor, the sick and the imprisoned. The Methodist preachers took the message to laborers and criminals who tended to be left outside organized religion at that time. In Britain, the Methodist Church had a major effect in the early decades of the making of the working class (1760–1820). In the United States, it became the religion of many slaves who later formed "black churches" in the Methodist tradition.

"Some would say the church should not be in politics," he said. "This is not political – this is Biblical."'

"I simply want the pastors to have that freedom and liberty that the First Amendment guarantees," he said.

On willingness to listen and dialogue with opposing views, Garlow has stated, "I feel like there's way too much misunderstanding and way too much name-calling on this issue and not enough civil, respectful dialogue." Gene Robinson, an Episcopal bishop and the first openly gay bishop of a major denomination, commented, "I think the real goal is not to change other people's minds, but to show that people with opposing views can have a civil dialogue."

One newspaper article stated, "It is best not to pigeonhole Garlow, said Morris Casuto, who recently retired as director of the San Diego Anti-Defamation League. Casuto has spent time with the Kansas-born pastor and calls him a friend, even though there are few issues they agree on. He has come to appreciate Garlow's sincere efforts at civil dialogue with those different from himself, including Jewish leaders and advocates of same-sex marriage. 'He's an interesting guy,' Casuto said. 'It's much easier to deal with a stereotype and oppose one than to try to understand a complex figure whose views may be anathema to yours.'"

=== Views on tax laws and role of churches ===
Jim Garlow has led the right wing evangelical movement to defy US law and the tax regulations by using his non-profit 501(c)(3) registered charity, Skline Wesleyan Church in La Mesa, California, to name specific candidates and urge his parishioners to vote as he directs. He acknowledges that his intentions, and indeed his past actions, are illegal, and make his church ineligible for tax free status; the church skips millions in annual property taxes to San Diego County by being a 501(c)(3) charity. A charity can take a position on policy issues but cannot act "on behalf of (or in opposition to) any candidate for public office". To cross that line puts the $7 million mega-church's tax break at risk. In spite of his pursuing this illegal conduct since 2008, Republican Congresspeople have successfully twarted any attempt to enforce the law with regard to Skline and Jim Garlow. The movement, which now includes hundreds of churches and pastors is responsible for the loss of more than $25 billion in tax revenue each year. This does not include the additional billions in property tax revenues lost by cities, counties and states. Although the IRS started an enforcement effort in 2004 against such abuses, the program ended in 2009 after being taken to court by the Alliance Defense Fund.

=== On Voting and Biblical Principles ===
Garlow has publicly endorsed Mitt Romney, arguing that "biblical principles should guide a voter's choice."

== Personal ==
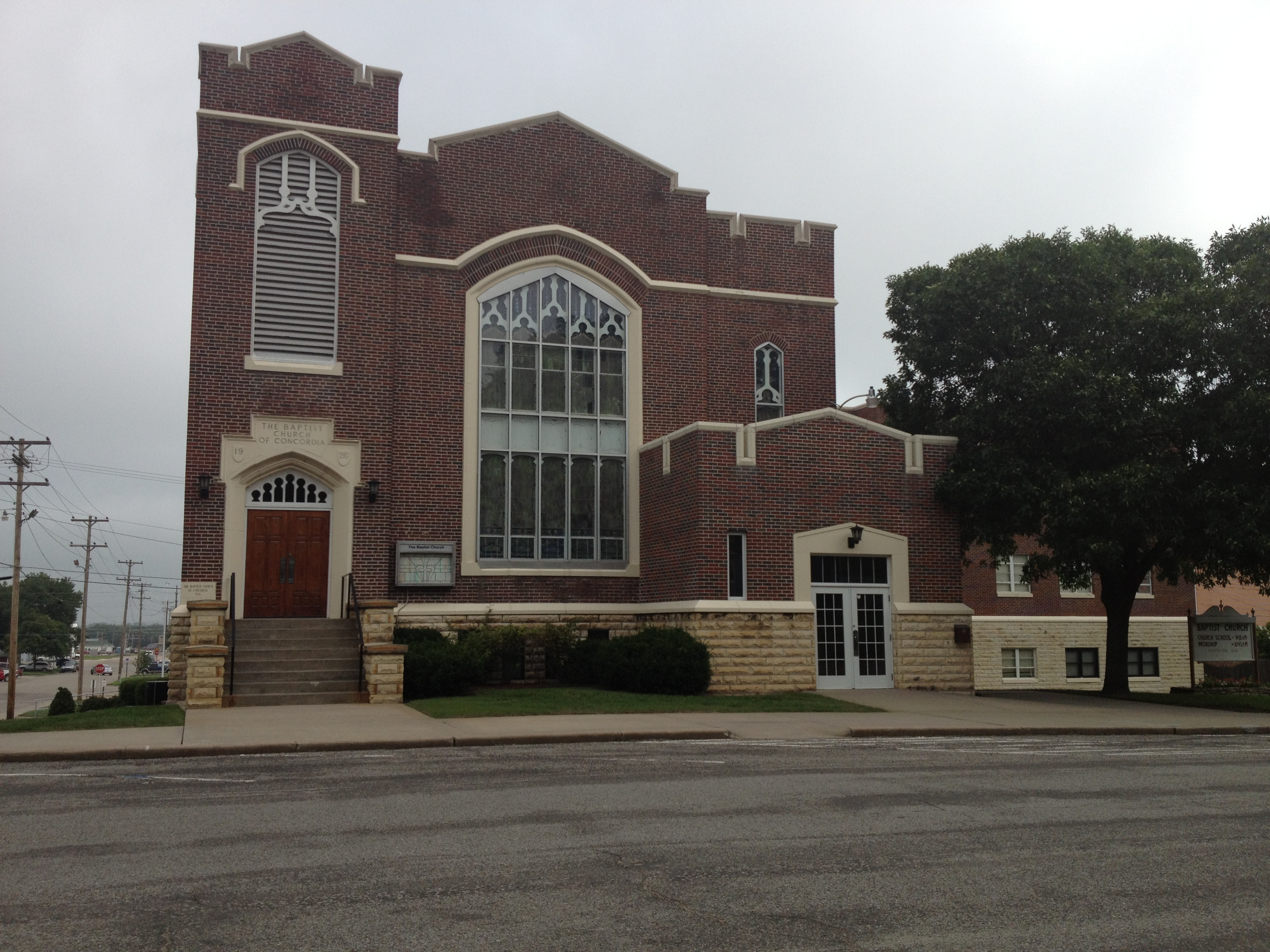
Garlow got his start in ministry at the First Baptist Church in Concordia, Kansas.

Garlow grew up in Concordia, Kansas. He earned a Ph.D. in historical theology from Drew University, a Master of Theology from Princeton Theological Seminary and Master of Divinity from Asbury Theological Seminary, bachelor's and master's degrees from Southern Nazarene University, and an associate degree from Oklahoma Wesleyan University (originally as Miltonvale Wesleyan College, now closed). Garlow later served as a professor at Oklahoma Wesleyan. Garlow has written 15 books, including the New York Times best-seller Cracking DaVinci's Code.

Carol, Garlow's wife of 42 years died of cancer in 2013. They were adoptive parents of four children. He married his current wife, the former Rosemary Schindler, in 2014. Between them, they have eight children and nine grandchildren.
