= Kelly's Ferry Cemetery =

Historic site in Marion County, Tennessee

- Kelly's Ferry Road and Cemetery
- U.S. National Register of Historic Places
- Location within Tennessee Location within the United States
- Nearest city: Guild, Tennessee
- Coordinates: 35°2′13″N 85°25′33″W
- Area: 3 acres (1.2 ha)
- Built: 1835
- MPS: Chickamauga-Chattanooga Civil War-Related Sites in Georgia and Tennessee MPS
- NRHP reference No.: 06001037
- Added to NRHP: November 15, 2006

Kelly's Ferry Cemetery is a historical cemetery located in Marion County, Tennessee, off U.S. Highway 41. It and its associated road are listed on the National Register of Historic Places. They are the only remnants of the extinct settlement of Kelly's Ferry.

== History ==
Kelly's Ferry Cemetery dates to the 1830s when a ferry was established across the Tennessee River by John Kelly. Shortly thereafter, a small community developed at the location. The ferry served as an important route across the river, and allowed goods to be off-loaded and transported by land to Chattanooga, thereby avoiding a treacherous stretch of the river upstream called "The Suck." The road leaving Kelly's Ferry led to Wauhatchie Junction, which became an important railroad junction on the Nashville and Chattanooga Railroad.

Kelly's Ferry played an important role in the Cherokee removal from eastern Tennessee. During this event, Chattanooga served as a collection and holding point, from which groups of Cherokee were marched westward on the Trail of Tears. The road to Kelly's Ferry and the ferry itself were one of only a few paths suitable for transportation of large groups of people and supplies, and the historical record shows several Cherokee detachments camped or traveled through there.

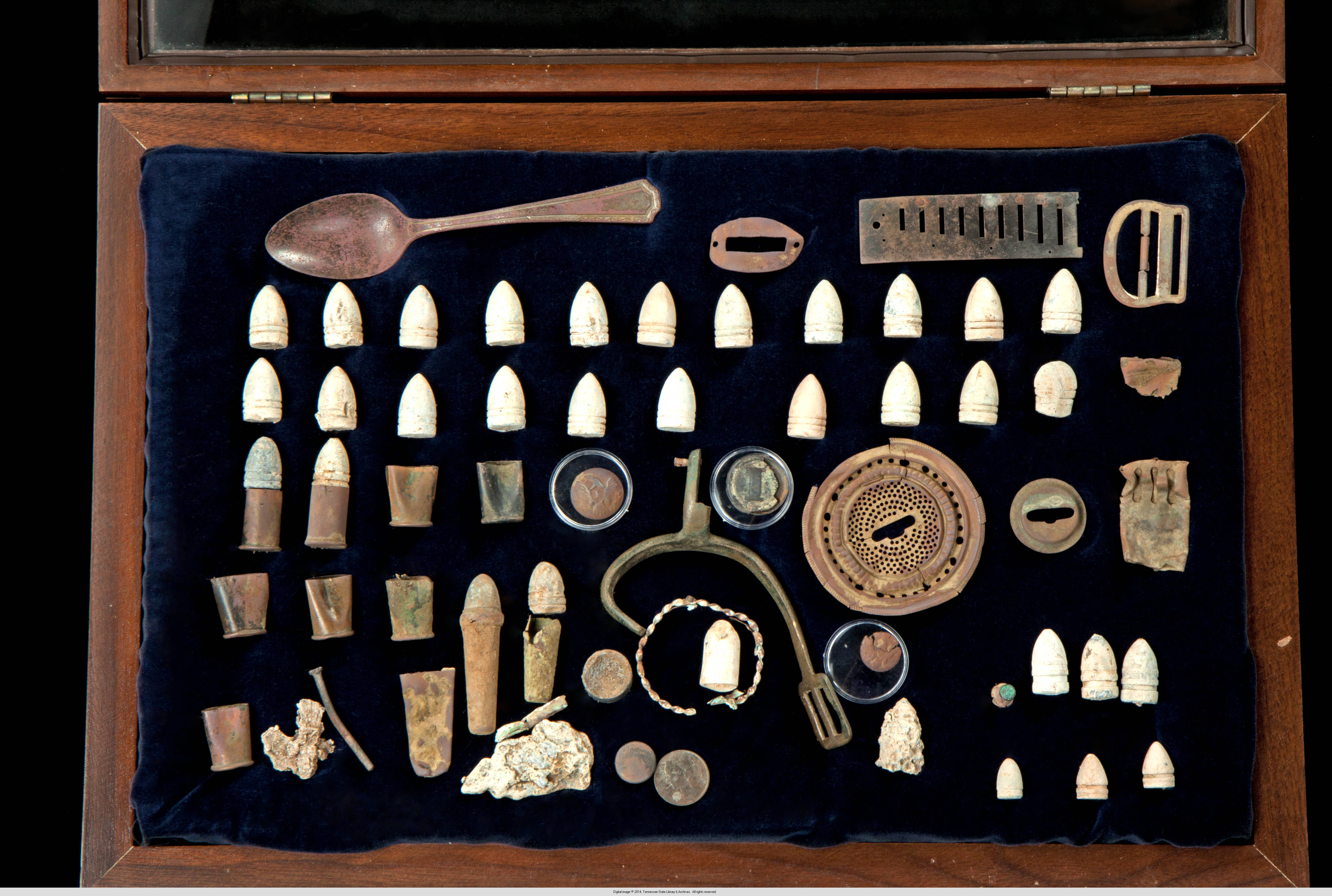
Artifacts found at the site of Kelly's Ferry.

Kelly's Ferry and its road also served as an important transportation route in the Civil War. During the Confederate siege of Chattanooga, a garrison of soldiers was stationed there to secure the crossing. The site was later occupied by the Union army, and was an important link in the famous "Cracker Line," the supply route established by General Ulysses Grant to break the siege. At this time, the road from Kelly's ferry was widened and improved by the Union forces to facilitate the movement of supplies.

Kelly's Ferry gradually declined in the early 20th century, and closed in 1952.

Kelly's Ferry Cemetery contains burials of many of the early settlers of the area, including John Kelly. Its earliest known burial dates to 1838. The site remains relatively intact, with little development in the area near the property.
