= Orval Butcher =

Evangelical pastor (1917–2010)

Pastor Orval Butcher

Orval Butcher (December 1, 1917 Valton, Wisconsin –October 5, 2010) was the founding pastor of Skyline Church located in Lemon Grove, California, a suburb of San Diego. He was senior pastor of the church for 27 years and grew the regular attendance to over 1,100. Butcher was a graduate of Miltonvale Wesleyan College, now part of Oklahoma Wesleyan University. He was known for his outstanding singing voice and spent several years as a traveling evangelist with Billy Graham.
