= Concordia Blade-Empire =

Newspaper in Kansas, United States

The Concordia Blade-Empire
- Type: Daily newspaper
- Format: Broadsheet
- Publisher: Art Lowell
- Editor: Brad Lowell
- Founded: 1870 (as The Republican Valley Empire)
- Language: English
- Headquarters: 510 Washington; Concordia, KS 66901; United States
- Circulation: 1,469
- Website: www.bladeempire.com

The Concordia Blade-Empire is a local newspaper for Concordia, Kansas. It is the official newspaper for Cloud County, Kansas. The paper publishes five days a week, Monday through Friday.

== History ==
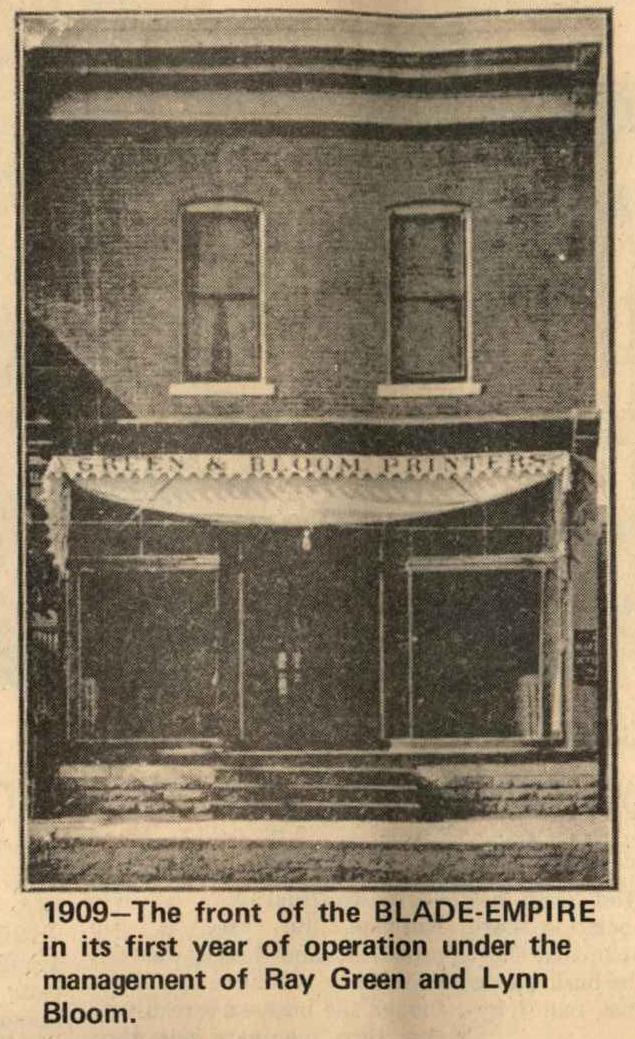

The Concordia Blade-Empire has a rich history of newspaper publication in the county. The paper today has its roots in two separate newspapers. (Several sources, including Janet Pease Emerey's book on the history of Concordia claim a third newspaper, The Republican, merged and/or was purchased by The Republican Valley Empire).

=== The Republican Valley Empire ===
The Concordia Blade-Empire was first published in Clyde as The Republican Valley Empire and was the first newspaper published in the county. The first edition was published on May 31, 1870.

During its first year of publication, newspaper owner/publisher Henry Buckingham decided to move the newspaper operations to Concordia and printed its first edition in Concordia on December 24, 1870.

=== The Blade ===
James Manney Hagaman started a newspaper in 1879 and named the publication The Kansas Blade. Hagaman's paper released its first edition on April 23, 1879.

=== The two papers merge ===
On May 29, 1920, the Empire and the Blade merged. Two papers were now printed by one publisher: a weekly edition named the Empire and the Daily Blade. This continued until May 9, 1919, when an agreement was struck with a competitive newspaper that printed the Daily Kansan and the weekly Kansan. The Publishers of the Kansan would only publish weekly while the Blade would publish daily. On June 2 of that same year, the paper was renamed The Concordia Blade-Empire.
