= Napoleon Bonaparte Brown =

American politician (1834–1910)

- Napoleon Bonaparte Brown
- Born: 1834; Illinois
- Died: March 18, 1910; St Joseph, Missouri, United States
- Occupation: Businessman

Napoleon Bonaparte Brown (1834 – March 18, 1910) was an American businessman and politician who lived in Kansas and Missouri in the late 19th and early 20th centuries. He is most known as the namesake and builder of the Brown Grand Theatre in Concordia, Kansas.

== Early life ==
Brown was named after Napoleon Bonaparte by his parents James & Nancy Brown. The 1850 Pike County, Illinois, census gives his age as 16 at that time. A later census (1900) in Concordia, KS gives his birthdate as Oct 1833. He appeared to have two siblings: a brother, Benjamin age 14; and a sister named May or Mary aged 11 listed in the census as well. Later military records list his hometown as Concord, Illinois, in neighboring Morgan County. until he resigned on January 17, 1865.

== Military career ==
"Colonel" Brown enlisted in the 101st Illinois Infantry Regiment on January 3, 1864, and given the rank of major. Major Brown served in "B" Company until he resigned on January 17, 1865—the very day the 101st crossed into South Carolina from Georgia under General William Tecumseh Sherman. Cloud county records show that he was paid the pension ($25.00) of a major. After he retired from the military, he "promoted himself" to the rank of colonel.

In a letter to the editor of the Kansas Blade (now the Concordia Blade-Empire), Brown claimed that he enlisted as a private on April 22, 1862, and was subsequently promoted to captain, major, and brevet lieutenant colonel.

== Business and philanthropy ==
"Colonel" Brown served in the state legislatures for both Kansas and Missouri and was a prominent banker in Kansas during its early years of development as the owner of the first bank in Cloud County, Kansas. N. B. Brown & Co., founded in 1878 with a rumored "suitcase full of money" that he had with him upon his arrival. Colonel Brown and his wife Katherine (Katie) then built Brownstone Hall, a 23-room Victorian-style 5,000-square-foot (460 m^{2}) stone mansion built in Concordia in 1883. Colonel Brown served as a Republican first in the Missouri House of Representatives, and then in the Kansas State Senate.

In 1905, Colonel Brown commissioned the building of the Brown Grand Theatre and entrusted its completion to his son, Earl Van Dom Brown. The theatre was completed in 1907.

== Politics ==
As a state Senator in Kansas, Brown fought a losing battle to restore Concordia Normal School as a state-run institution. The school was one of several Normal schools placed throughout the state in 1874 under governor Thomas A. Osborn, but was consolidated by the state legislature in 1876. The state normal school would later become Emporia State University.

== Image gallery ==
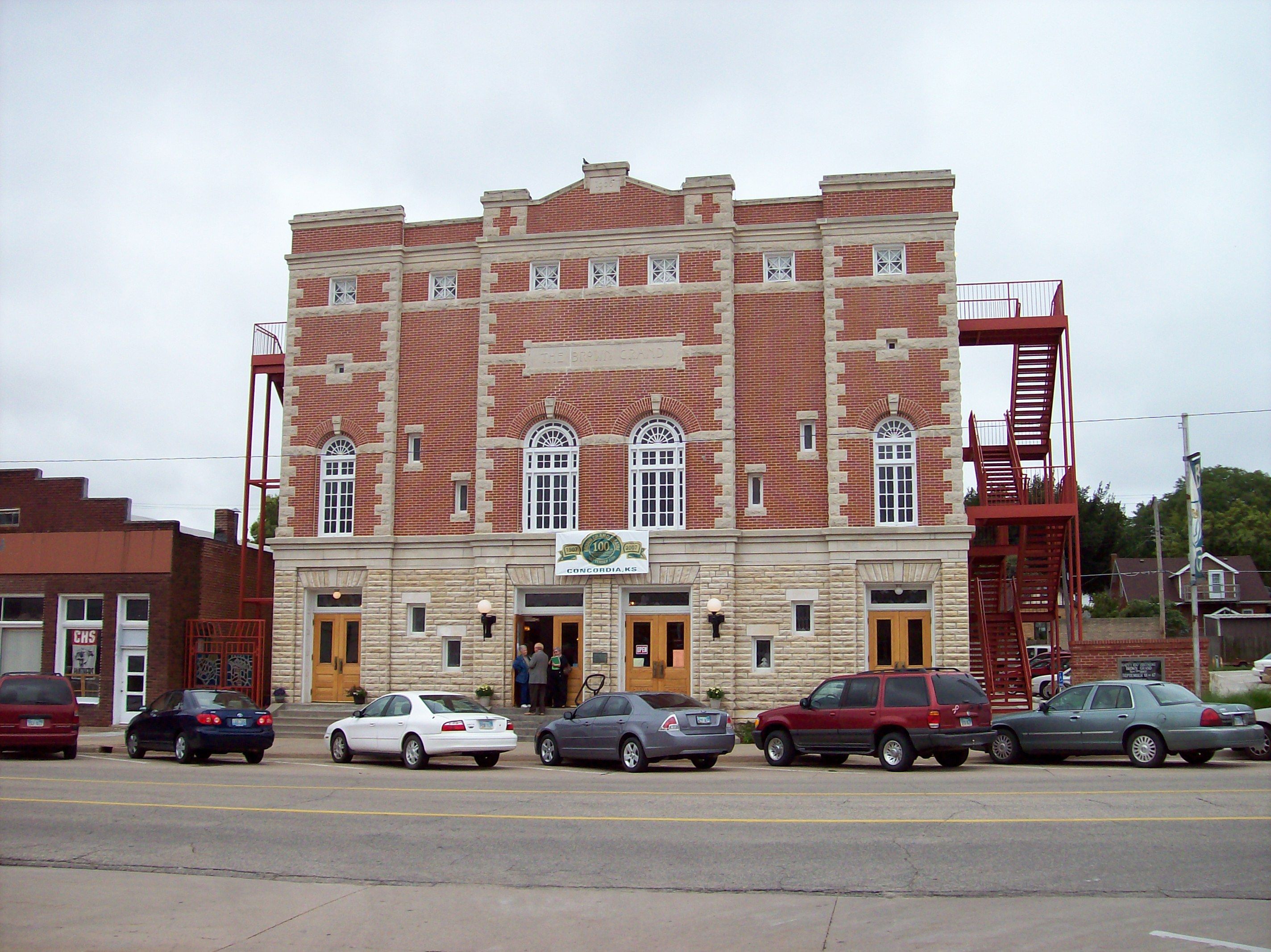
Brown Grand Theatre in Concordia

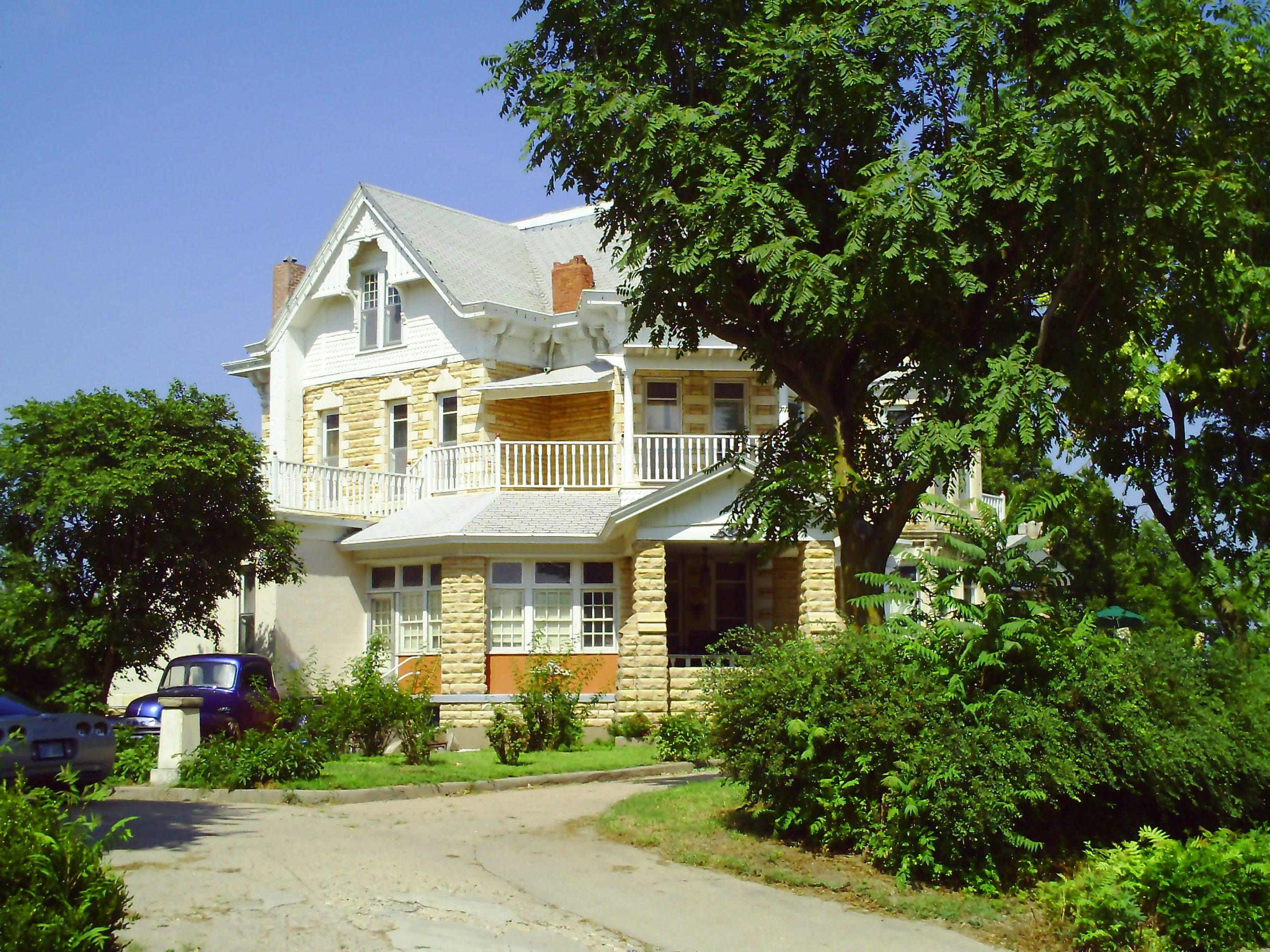
Brownstone Manor, home of Napoleon Bonaparte Brown in Concordia
