= Skyline Church =

- Skyline Wesleyan Church
- Skyline Church
- 32°44′34″N 116°57′09″W
- Location: 11330 Campo Road; La Mesa, California 91941
- Country: United States
- Denomination: Wesleyan Church
- Website: skylinechurch.org

History
- Founded: 1954
- Founder: Pastor Orval Butcher

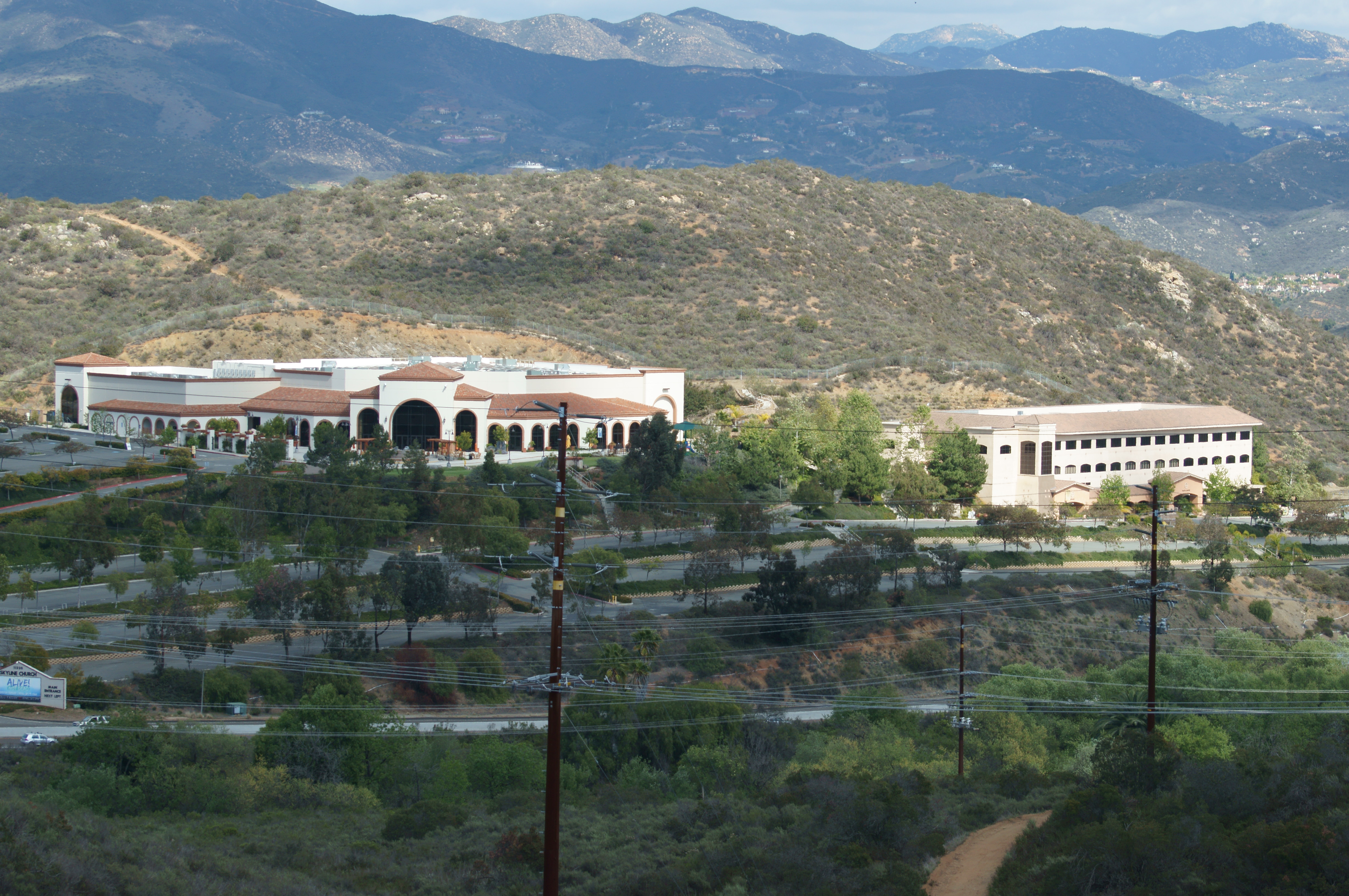
On the hill across from the church, slightly higher in elevation.

Skyline Church is an evangelical Christian megachurch located in Rancho San Diego, California, affiliated with the Wesleyan Church denomination. The church currently averages 2,500 in attendance per week.

== History ==
In 1954, Orval Butcher founded Skyline Wesleyan Church in Lemon Grove, California and served as senior pastor for 27 years. In 1974, because the church had outgrown its original 350-seat sanctuary, a 1,000-seat auditorium was completed. Weekly attendance had grown to about 1,100 when he retired in 1981. Derric Johnson was the youth pastor and music director of the church during the 1960s.

In 1981, John C. Maxwell succeeded Butcher as the church's second senior pastor. Under Maxwell's leadership, Skyline nearly tripled its average attendance, from 1,100 to 3,000. In 1995, Maxwell stepped down to focus on his international ministry, Injoy, which provides leadership tools and materials to pastors and lay leaders. Maxwell went on to success as an author and "leadership guru."

Jim Garlow became Skyline's third pastor in 1995. Garlow is often cited as an evangelical leader in the political arena, quoted on issues such as the 2012 Republican presidential primary. In 2008, Garlow and the church were noted for their leading role in organizing conservative religious groups to support California Proposition 8, which banned same-sex marriage in California prior to the U.S. Supreme Court's holding in Obergfell v. Hodges . He is a leader in the "pulpit freedom" movement, which insists that pastors should be free to carry out political advocacy from the pulpit, which currently is in defiance of federal law and Internal Revenue Service regulations for "double tax-exempt organizations", that is organizations such as churches which not only operate tax-free but which also receive contributions which are deductible from the donor's federal income tax.

In 2000, the church moved to a new facility in La Mesa. (Although the church's address is in La Mesa, it is often described as being in adjacent Rancho San Diego, California). The move was plagued by difficulties, resulting in nearly $27 million being spent preparing the site infrastructure for a building that should have cost only $6 million. Up until 2012, Skyline had one three-story building, called the "Family Center," which was Phase I of the church's master plan. Four weekend services were held in a 1,000-seat auditorium in the Family Center. Ground was broken in November 2010 for a worship center to include a 2,500-seat auditorium, a multipurpose room/gymnasium, a 200-seat traditional chapel, and a café. The new 60,000 square foot sanctuary opened in March 2012.

In November 2018, Jeremy McGarity became the Senior Pastor of Skyline Church. Pastor Jeremy merged his church, Seven, with Skyline Church. This was the first satellite campus Skyline Church has launched and would be marked as the start of many campuses. In Jeremy McGarity's third year of being Senior Pastor, he was called to launch a 10/10/10 campaign in October 2021.
