= Master of Religion =

The Master of Religion (MRel) was a three-year graduate theological degree granted conjointly by Wycliffe College in Toronto, Ontario, Canada and the University of Toronto. As of 2012, Wycliffe College no longer grants admission to the program.

The MRel is commonly used as a preparatory degree for doctoral studies, although it is also considered formative for careers in "teaching, research, Christian journalism, translating, and social service.". The program allowed for an unusually high number of course electives, allowing for breadth and/or depth. It required the completion of 26 courses and a 25,000 word thesis.

== Notable scholars who hold the Master of Religion ==
Some notable scholars who hold the MRel from Wycliffe College include Terence L. Donaldson, Bruce W. Longenecker, Brian C. Stiller, Mark Husbands, Michael A. G. Haykin, L. Gregory Bloomquist, L. Wayne McCready, and Rebecca Idestrom.

== See also ==
- Association of Theological Schools in the United States and Canada
- Toronto School of Theology
