= James Manney Hagaman =

American politician

- James Manney Hagaman, founder of Concordia, Kansas
- Born: 1830
- Died: January 18, 1904 (aged 73–74); Concordia, Kansas
- Occupations: Lawyer, businessman, publisher
- Spouse: Mary Hagaman
- Children: James E Hagaman

James Manney Hagaman (1830 – January 18, 1904) was a lawyer, land agent, newspaper editor, and the founder of Concordia, Kansas. He and his wife settled in what is now Cloud County in 1860. In addition to founding the town of Concordia, he is credited with leading the movement to separate what was then Shirley Township from Washington County in 1866.

== Political career ==
In 1866, the people of Shirley Township sent Hagaman to Governor of Kansas Samuel J. Crawford with the petition requesting the right to organize as a county. The governor granted permission and Shirley Township became Shirley County (later "Cloud" County).

Hagaman was elected county clerk and promptly became a candidate to be the first to represent Shirley County in the Kansas House of Representatives, losing to John B. Rupe. In 1868, he ran again for the Kansas House and this time won, barely defeating a man named Donoho. He later served two terms as Mayor of Concordia from 1878–1880 and also served five terms on the city council.

== The founding of Concordia ==
As Hagaman rose to political power in the state of Kansas, he faced political opposition in the town of Clyde, Kansas from several sources. In her book on the history of Concordia, Janet Pease Emery wrote:

Jim Hagaman was done with Clyde. He swore it would never be the county seat. If it took every ox, cow, and horse he owned, he'd see that the courthouse went elsewhere – even if he had to build a town himself. Madder than hops, Hagaman took out a claim in Lincoln Township and founded Concordia.

== Newspaper editor ==
In 1879, Hagaman (along with his son James E. Hagaman) founded The Concordia Blade newspaper, the third local newspaper printed in the town. The paper struggled in its early years, as did the other local publications (The Empire and the Republican). In 1889 he sold out his interest to The Blade Publishing Company. All three papers were later merged to form the Concordia Blade-Empire which is still in publication as of 2013.

== His death ==
James Hagaman died in Concordia in 1904. Although he had been behind the scenes for over 25 years and in front on both the town council and as the mayor, the city council made no official mention of his passing. Janet Pease Emery's book states "Hagaman left life passively, causing not a ripple in the pond where for so many years he was the big fish." Although no one knew how old he was at death, those close to him guessed he was around 73 years old. His widow Mary Hagaman purchased a cemetery plot and presumably buried him there in an unmarked grave.
