= Henry Buckingham (publisher) =

- Born: May 28, 1830
- Died: January 25, 1916 (aged 85)
- Occupations: Newspaper publisher, community promoter
- Known for: Founder of the first newspaper in Cloud County, Kansas (The Republican Valley Empire)
- Board member of: Republican Valley Railway Company

Henry Buckingham (May 28, 1830 – January 25, 1916) was an American newspaper publisher and community promoter in Cloud County, Kansas. He is widely regarded as being the first to publish a newspaper in the county and makes that claim in an article written by him that was published in 1894. The paper he founded, The Republican Valley Empire was the forerunner to the current publication the Concordia Blade-Empire, a daily newspaper published in Concordia, Kansas.

Buckingham, who was originally from Huron County, Ohio, was also instrumental in bringing railroad lines to Cloud County, serving on the board of the Republican Valley Railway Company.
