= 1968 Big Ten Conference football season =

- Sport: American football
- Number of teams: 10
- Top draft pick: Leroy Keyes
- Champion: Ohio State
- Season MVP: Ron Johnson

Seasons
- ← 1967 1969 →

1968 Big Ten Conference football standings
	Conf.					Overall
Team	W		L		T	W		L		T
No. 1 Ohio State $	7	–	0	–	0	10	–	0	–	0
No. 12 Michigan	6	–	1	–	0	8	–	2	–	0
No. 10 Purdue	5	–	2	–	0	8	–	2	–	0
Minnesota	5	–	2	–	0	6	–	4	–	0
Indiana	4	–	3	–	0	6	–	4	–	0
Iowa	4	–	3	–	0	5	–	5	–	0
Michigan State	2	–	5	–	0	5	–	5	–	0
Illinois	1	–	6	–	0	1	–	9	–	0
Northwestern	1	–	6	–	0	1	–	9	–	0
Wisconsin	0	–	7	–	0	0	–	10	–	0
$ – Conference champion; Rankings from AP Poll

The 1968 Big Ten Conference football season was the 73rd season of college football played by the member schools of the Big Ten Conference and was a part of the 1968 NCAA University Division football season.

The 1968 Ohio State Buckeyes football team, under head coach Woody Hayes, compiled a perfect 10–0 record, won the Big Ten championship, defeated USC in the 1969 Rose Bowl, and was recognized as the consensus national champion. Offensive end Dave Foley was a consensus first-team All-American, and offensive tackle Rufus Mayes was also recognized as a first-team All-American by two selectors. Running back Jim Otis led the team with 985 rushing yards and 102 points scored, and Rex Kern led the team with 1,506 yards of total offense. Linebacker Jack Tatum was a first-team All-Big Ten player.

The 1968 Michigan Wolverines football team, under head coach Bump Elliott, finished in second place with an 8–2 record and was ranked No. 12 in the final AP Poll. Michigan was ranked No. 4 before losing to Ohio State, 50–14, in the final game of the season. In a victory over Wisconsin, Ron Johnson set an NCAA record with 347 rushing yards. Johnson led the Big Ten with 1,391 rushing yards and 19 touchdowns and won the Chicago Tribune Silver Football trophy as the conference's most valuable player. Quarterback Dennis Brown led the conference with 1,562 passing yards and 1,777 yards of total offense. Defensive back Tom Curtis set a new Big Ten single season record with 10 interceptions.

The 1968 Purdue Boilermakers football team, under head coach Jack Mollenkopf, was ranked No. 1 in the AP poll before losing to Ohio State in week four. The Boilermakers finished in third place and were ranked No. 10 in the final AP poll. Leroy Keyes rushed for 1,003 yards (second to Ron Johnson) and finished second in the 1968 Heisman Trophy voting (behind O. J. Simpson). Keyes was the first Big Ten player selected in the 1969 NFL/AFL draft with the third overall pick. Keyes and middle guard Chuck Kyle were both selected as first-team consensus All-Americans. Quarterback Mike Phipps totaled 1,096 passing yards.

== Season overview ==
=== Results and team statistics ===
Conf. rank	Team	Head coach	AP final	AP high	Overall record	Conf. record	PPG	PAG	MVP
1	Ohio State	Woody Hayes	#1	#1	10–0	7–0	**32.3**	**15.0**	Mark Stier
2	Michigan	Bump Elliott	#12	#4	8–2	6–1	27.7	15.5	**Ron Johnson**
3 (tie)	Purdue	Jack Mollenkopf	#10	#1	8–2	5–2	29.1	16.7	Leroy Keyes
3 (tie)	Minnesota	Murray Warmath	NR	#15	6–4	5–2	20.7	19.0	Wayne King
5 (tie)	Indiana	John Pont	NR	#13	6–4	4–3	25.0	26.2	Harry Gonso; Al Gage
5 (tie)	Iowa	Ray Nagel	NR	NR	5–5	4–3	32.2	28.9	Ed Podolak
7	Michigan State	Duffy Daugherty	NR	#12	5–5	2–5	20.2	15.1	Al Brenner
8 (tie)	Illinois	Jim Valek	NR	NR	1–9	1–6	10.7	33.3	Rich Johnson
8 (tie)	Northwestern	Alex Agase	NR	NR	1–9	1–6	10.9	32.5	Jack Rudnay
10	Wisconsin	John Coatta	NR	NR	0–10	0–7	8.6	31.0	Ken Criter

Key
AP final = Team's rank in the final AP Poll of the 1968 season
AP high = Team's highest rank in the AP Poll throughout the 1968 season
PPG = Average of points scored per game
PAG = Average of points allowed per game
MVP = Most valuable player as voted by players on each team as part of the voting process to determine the winner of the Chicago Tribune Silver Football trophy; trophy winner in bold

=== Regular season ===
==== September 20–21 ====
The Big Ten Conference football teams opened their seasons with nine non-conference games resulting in five wins and five losses. Northwestern's game was played on Friday, September 20, 1968, and the other eight games were played on Saturday, September 21, 1968. Ohio State had a bye week.

- Miami (FL) 28, Northwestern 7. Northwestern lost to Miami (FL), 28–7, in Miami, Florida.
- Purdue 44, Virginia 6. Purdue (ranked No. 1 in the AP Poll) defeated Virginia, 44–6, at Ross–Ade Stadium in West Lafayette, Indiana.
- California 21, Michigan 7. Michigan lost to California, 21–7, before a crowd of 71,386 at Michigan Stadium in Ann Arbor, Michigan. California halfback Gary Fowler scored twice in the opening quarter on runs of 12 and 6 yards to give California a 14 to 0 lead. Michigan scored in the second quarter on an eight-yard pass from Dennis Brown to Jim Mandich. Fowler scored again on a 12-yard run in the fourth quarter to extend California's lead.
- USC 29, Minnesota 20. Minnesota lost to USC, 29–20, before a crowd of 60,820 at Memorial Stadium in Minneapolis.
- Indiana 40, Baylor 36. Indiana defeated Baylor, 40–36, at the Seventeenth Street Stadium in Bloomington, Indiana.
- Iowa 21, Oregon State 20. Iowa defeated Oregon State (ranked No. 8 in the AP Poll), 21–20, at Iowa Stadium in Iowa City, Iowa.
- Michigan State 14, Syracuse 10. Michigan State defeated Syracuse, 14–10, at Spartan Stadium in East Lansing, Michigan.
- Kansas 47, Illinois 7. Illinois lost to Kansas, 47–7, at Memorial Stadium in Champaign, Illinois.
- Arizona State 55, Wisconsin 7. Wisconsin lost to Arizona State, 55–7, before a crowd of 43,317 at Sun Devil Stadium in Tempe, Arizona.

==== September 28 ====
On September 28, 1968, the Big Ten Conference football teams played 10 non-conference games resulting in four wins and six losses, bringing the conference's record against non-conference opponents to 9–11 on the season.

- Purdue 37, Notre Dame 22. In the annual battle for the Shillelagh Trophy, Purdue (ranked No. 1 in the AP Poll) defeated Notre Dame (ranked No. 2), 37–22, at Notre Dame Stadium in South Bend, Indiana.
- Ohio State 35, SMU 14. Ohio State (ranked No. 11 in the AP Poll) defeated SMU, 35–14, before a crowd of 73,855 at Ohio Stadium in Columbus, Ohio.
- Michigan 31, Duke 10. Michigan defeated Duke, 31–10, before a crowd of 25,000 at Wallace Wade Stadium in Durham, North Carolina. Michigan halfback Ron Johnson gained 205 rushing yards (189 yards in the first half alone) and scored two touchdowns on runs of 53 yards in the second quarter and one yard in the fourth quarter. Michigan's other two touchdowns were scored by Jerry Imsland (23-yard pass from Dennis Brown in the first quarter) and Marty Huff (44-yard interception return in the fourth quarter).
- Kansas 38, Indiana 20. Indiana (ranked No. 13 in the AP Poll) lost to Kansas (ranked No. 12), 38–20, at Memorial Stadium in Lawrence, Kansas.
- Nebraska 17, Minnesota 14. Minnesota (ranked No. 17 in the AP Poll) lost to Nebraska (ranked No. 9), 17–14, before a crowd of 55,362 at Memorial Stadium in Minneapolis.
- TCU 28, Iowa 17. Iowa lost to TCU, 28–17, at Amon G. Carter Stadium in Fort Worth, Texas.
- Michigan State 28, Baylor 10. Michigan State defeated Baylor, 28–10, at Spartan Stadium in East Lansing, Michigan.
- Missouri 44, Illinois 0. Illinois lost to Missouri, 44–0, at Memorial Stadium in Champaign, Illinois.
- USC 24, Northwestern 7. Northwestern lost to USC (ranked No. 3 in the AP Poll), 24–7,
- Washington 21, Wisconsin 17. Wisconsin lost to Washington, 21–17, before a crowd of 42,965 at Camp Randall Stadium in Madison, Wisconsin.

==== October 5 ====
On October 5, 1968, the Big Ten Conference football teams played three conference games and four non-conference games. The non-conference games resulted in three wins and one loss, bringing the conference's record against non-conference opponents to 12–12 on the season.

- Purdue 43, Northwestern 6. Purdue (ranked No. 1 in the AP Poll) defeated Northwestern, 43–6, at Dyche Stadium in Evanston, Illinois.
- Ohio State 21, Oregon 6. Ohio State (ranked No. 6 in the AP Poll) defeated Oregon, 21–6, before a crowd of 70,191 at Ohio Stadium in Columbus, Ohio.
- Michigan 32, Navy 9. Michigan defeated Navy, 32–9, before a crowd of 56,501 at Michigan Stadium in Ann Arbor, Michigan. Ron Johnson gained 121 yards on 22 carries. George Hoey returned a punt 63 yards to set up Johnson's first touchdown and returned another punt 36 yards to set up Dennis Brown's touchdown pass to Jim Mandich. Hoey also intercepted two Navy passes, returning one of them 48 yards. Navy did not score its lone touchdown until 30 seconds remained in the game.
- Indiana 28, Illinois 14. Indiana defeated Illinois, 28–14, at Seventeenth Street Stadium in Bloomington, Indiana.
- Minnesota 24, Wake Forest 19. Minnesota defeated Wake Forest, 24–19, before a crowd of 39,277 at Memorial Stadium in Minneapolis.
- Notre Dame 51, Iowa 28. Iowa lost to Notre Dame (ranked No. 5 in the AP Poll), 51–28, at Iowa Stadium in Iowa City.
- Michigan State 29, Wisconsin 0. Michigan State (ranked No. 19 in the AP Poll) defeated Wisconsin, 29–0, before a crowd of 49,067 at Camp Randall Stadium in Madison, Wisconsin.

==== October 12 ====
On October 12, 1968, the Big Ten Conference football teams played four conference games and two non-conference games. The non-conference games resulted in two losses, bringing the conference's record against non-conference opponents to 12–14 on the season.

- Ohio State 13, Purdue 0. Ohio State (ranked No. 4 in the AP Poll) defeated Purdue (ranked No. 1), 13–0, before a crowd of 84,834 at Ohio Stadium in Columbus, Ohio.
- Michigan 28, Michigan State 14. Michigan defeated Michigan State (ranked No. 12 in the AP Poll), 28–14, before a crowd of 102,785 at Michigan Stadium in Ann Arbor, Michigan. Michigan quarterback Dennis Brown completed nine of 15 passes for 177 yards and two touchdowns. Jim Mandich caught four passes for 125 yards, including a 53-yard touchdown reception, and John Gabler also caught a touchdown pass. Ron Johnson carried the ball 19 times for 152 yards and a touchdown. Fullback Garvie Craw also ran 25 yards for a touchdown and caught a pass from Brown for a two-point conversion.
- Minnesota 17, Illinois 10. Minnesota defeated Illinois, 17–10, before a crowd of 49,864 at Memorial Stadium in Minneapolis.
- Indiana 38, Iowa 34. Indiana defeated Iowa, 38–34, at Iowa Stadium in Iowa City.
- Notre Dame 27, Northwestern 7. Notre Dame defeated Northwestern, 27–7, at Notre Dame Stadium in South Bend, Indiana.
- Utah State 20, Wisconsin 0. Wisconsin lost to Utah State, 20–0, before a crowd of 37,469 at Camp Randall Stadium in Madison, Wisconsin.

==== October 19 ====
On October 19, 1968, the Big Ten Conference football teams played four conference games and two non-conference games. The non-conference games resulted in one win and one loss, bringing the conference's record against non-conference opponents to 13–15 on the season.

- Ohio State 45, Northwestern 21. Ohio State (ranked No. 2 in the AP Poll) defeated Northwestern, 45–21, before a crowd of 83,454 at Ohio Stadium in Columbus, Ohio.
- Purdue 28, Wake Forest 27. Purdue (ranked No. 5 in the AP Poll) defeated Wake Forest, 28–27, at Ross–Ade Stadium in West Lafayette, Indiana.
- Michigan 27, Indiana 22. Michigan (ranked No. 18 in the AP Poll) defeated Indiana (ranked No. 19), 27–22, before a crowd of 51,951 at Memorial Stadium in Bloomington, Indiana. Michigan quarterback Dennis Brown completed 14 of 30 passes for 162 yards and two touchdowns. Ron Johnson gained 163 rushing yards and scored one touchdown on 34 carries. Indiana mistakes on consecutive plays led to two Michigan touchdowns in the third quarter: Jerry Hartman returned an interception 62 yards for a touchdown and Indiana fumbled the kickoff following Hartman's touchdown.
- Minnesota 14, Michigan State 13. Minnesota defeated Michigan State, 14–13, before a crowd of 74,321 at Spartan Stadium in East Lansing, Michigan.
- Iowa 41, Wisconsin 0. Iowa defeated Wisconsin, 41–0, at Iowa Stadium in Iowa City.
- Notre Dame 58, Illinois 8. Notre Dame defeated Illinois, 58–8, before a crowd of 59,075 at Notre Dame Stadium in South Bend, Indiana.

==== October 26 ====
On October 26, 1968, the Big Ten Conference football teams played four conference games and two non-conference games. The non-conference games both resulted in victories, bringing the conference's record against non-conference opponents to 15–15 on the season.

- Ohio State 31, Illinois 24. In the annual battle for the Illibuck, Ohio State (ranked No.2 in the AP Poll) defeated Illinois, 31–24, before a crowd of 56,174 at Memorial Stadium in Champaign, Illinois.
- Purdue 44, Iowa 14. Purdue (ranked No. 7 in the AP Poll) defeated Iowa, 44–14, at Ross–Ade Stadium in West Lafayette, Indiana.
- Michigan 33, Minnesota 20. In the annual battle for the Little Brown Jug, Michigan (ranked No. 12 in the AP Poll) defeated Minnesota, 33–20, before a crowd of 69,384 at Michigan Stadium in Ann Arbor, Michigan. Dennis Brown completed 11 of 20 passes for 152 yards and two touchdowns. Bill Harris caught three passes for 85 yards and a touchdown. Ron Johnson carried the ball 33 times for 84 yards and two touchdowns. Michigan led 30–0 at halftime and 33–0 at the start of the fourth quarter, but Minnesota mounted a comeback with 20 points in the fourth quarter.
- Indiana 16, Arizona 13. Indiana defeated Arizona, 16–13, at Seventeenth Street Stadium in Bloomington, Indiana.
- Michigan State 21, Notre Dame 17. Michigan State defeated Notre Dame (ranked No. 5 in the AP Poll), 21–17, before a crowd of 77,339 at Spartan Stadium in East Lansing, Michigan.
- Minnesota 23, Wisconsin 15. In the annual battle for Paul Bunyan's Axe, Minnesota defeated Wisconsin, 23–15, before a crowd of 39,214 at Camp Randall Stadium in Madison, Wisconsin.

==== November 2 ====
On November 2, 1968, the Big Ten Conference football teams played five conference games.

- Ohio State 25, Michigan State 20. Ohio State (ranked No. 2 in the AP Poll) defeated Michigan State (ranked No. 16), 25–20, before a crowd of 84,859 at Ohio Stadium in Columbus, Ohio.
- Purdue 35, Illinois 17. Purdue (ranked No. 6 in the AP Poll) defeated Illinois, 35–17, at Ross–Ade Stadium in West Lafayette, Indiana.
- Michigan 35, Northwestern 0. Michigan (ranked No. 9 in the AP Poll) defeated Northwestern, 35–0, before a crowd of 40,101 at Dyche Stadium in Evanston, Illinois. Michigan scored 28 points in the second quarter (21 of them within 73 seconds), including two touchdowns on short runs by Ron Johnson and another on a 50-yard interception return by Dan Parks. Ron Johnson rushed for 129 yards and two touchdowns on 24 carries. Tom Curtis intercepted two passes in the game.
- Minnesota 35, Iowa 28. Minnesota defeated Iowa, 35–28, before a crowd of 57,703 at Memorial Stadium in Minneapolis.
- Indiana 21, Wisconsin 20. Indiana defeated Wisconsin, 21–20, before a crowd of 51,666 at Camp Randall Stadium in Madison, Wisconsin.

==== November 9 ====
On November 9, 1968, the Big Ten Conference football teams played five conference games.

- Ohio State 43, Wisconsin 8. Ohio State (ranked No. 2 in the AP Poll) defeated Wisconsin, 43–8, before a crowd of 40,972 at Camp Randall Stadium in Madison, Wisconsin.
- Michigan 36, Illinois 0. Michigan (ranked No. 7 in the AP Poll) defeated Illinois, 36–0, before a crowd of 56,775 at Michigan Stadium in Ann Arbor, Michigan. Dennis Brown completed 13 of 27 passes for 226 yards and two touchdowns, ran for a two-point conversion, and also rushed for 45 yards. Jim Mandich led the receivers with seven catches for 84 yards, while touchdown catches were made by Billy Harris (69-yard pass from Brown), Paul Staroba (14-yard pass from Brown), and Mike Hankwitz (six-yard pass from Don Moorhead). Ron Johnson rushed for 51 yards and two touchdowns on 19 carries.
- Minnesota 27, Purdue 13. Minnesota defeated Purdue (ranked No. 6 in the AP Poll), 27–13, at Memorial Stadium in Minneapolis.
- Indiana 24, Michigan State 22. In the annual battle for the Old Brass Spittoon, Indiana defeated Michigan State (ranked No. 17 in the AP Poll), 24–22, at Spartan Stadium in East Lansing, Michigan.
- Iowa 68, Northwestern 34. Iowa defeated Northwestern, 68–34, at Iowa Stadium in Iowa City.

==== November 16 ====
On November 16, 1968, the Big Ten Conference football teams played five conference games.

- Ohio State 33, Iowa 27. Ohio State (ranked No. 2 in the AP Poll) defeated Iowa, 33–27, before a crowd of 44,131 at Iowa Stadium in Iowa City.
- Michigan 34, Wisconsin 9. Michigan (ranked No. 4 in the AP Poll) defeated Wisconsin, 34–9, before a crowd of 51,117 at Michigan Stadium in Ann Arbor. Ron Johnson set a modern Big Ten Conference record with 347 rushing yards on 31 carries. Johnson also scored all five touchdowns for Michigan on runs of 35, 67, 1, 60, and 49 yards. Tom Curtis also set a Big Ten record with his tenth interception of the season.
- Purdue 9, Michigan State 0. Purdue (ranked No. 15 in the AP Poll) defeated Michigan State, at Spartan Stadium in East Lansing, Michigan.
- Minnesota 20, Indiana 6. Minnesota defeated Indiana, 20–6, before a crowd of 49,234 at Memorial Stadium in Bloomington, Indiana.
- Illinois 14, Northwestern 0. Illinois defeated Northwestern, 14–0, at Memorial Stadium in Champaign, Illinois.

==== November 23 ====
On November 23, 1968, the Big Ten Conference football teams concluded their regular seasons with five conference games.

- Ohio State 50, Michigan 14. In the annual Michigan–Ohio State rivalry game, Ohio State (ranked No. 2 in the AP Poll) defeated Michigan (ranked No. 4), 50–14, before a crowd of 85,371 at Ohio Stadium in Columbus. Led by Jim Otis, Ohio State gained 421 rushing yards in the game. Otis accounted for 143 yards and scored four touchdowns, while Rex Kern tallied 96 rushing yards and 41 passing yards. Ron Johnson gained 91 rushing yards and scored both touchdowns for Michigan.
- Purdue 38, Indiana 35. In the annual battle for the Old Oaken Bucket, Purdue (ranked No. 12 in the AP Poll) defeated Indiana, 38–35, at Ross–Ade Stadium in West Lafayette, Indiana.
- Minnesota 23, Wisconsin 15. Minnesota defeated Wisconsin, 23–15, before a crowd of 39,214 at Camp Randall Stadium in Madison, Wisconsin.
- Iowa 37, Illinois 13. Iowa defeated Illinois, 37–13, at Memorial Stadium in Champaign, Illinois.
- Michigan State 31, Northwestern 14. Michigan State defeated Northwestern, 31–14, at Dyche Stadium in Evanston, Illinois.

=== Bowl game ===
Team	1	2	3	4	Total
• Ohio St	0	10	3	14	27
USC	0	10	0	6	16

- Date: January 1
- Location: Rose Bowl

Scoring summary
Q2	9:40	USC	Ayala 21 yard field goal	USC 3–0
Q2	6:38	USC	Simpson 80 yard run (Ayala kick)	USC 10–0
Q2	1:45	OHST	Otis 1 yard run (Roman kick)	USC 10–7
Q2	:03	OHST	Roman 26 yard field goal	Tie 10–10
Q3	1:40	OHST	Roman 25 yard field goal	OHST 13–10
Q4	13:52	OHST	Hayden 4 yard pass from Kern (Roman kick)	OHST 20–10
Q4	10:05	OHST	Gillian 16 yard pass from Kern (Roman kick)	OHST 27–10
Q4	:45	USC	Dickerson 19 yard pass from Sogge (pass failed)	OHST 27–16

The 1969 Rose Bowl matched No. 1 Ohio State against No. 2 USC led by Heisman Trophy winner O. J. Simpson. The Buckeyes defeated the Trojans, 27–16, before a crowd of 102,063 at the Rose Bowl in Pasadena, California. Simpson rushed for 171 yards, including an 80-yard touchdown run. USC had five turnovers, including two by O. J. Simpson.

=== Post-season developments ===
On December 24, 1968, the University of Michigan announced that head football coach Bump Elliott would assume a new job as associate athletic director and that a new football coach was being sought. Two days later, the university announced that Bo Schembechler had been hired as Elliott's replacement.

== Statistical leaders ==
The Big Ten's individual statistical leaders for the 1968 season include the following:

=== Passing yards ===
Rank	Name	Team	Yards
1	Dennis Brown	Michigan	1,562
2	Dave Shelbourne	Northwestern	1,358
3	Larry Lawrence	Iowa	1,307
4	Harry Gonso	Indiana	1,109
5	Mike Phipps	Purdue	1,096

=== Rushing yards ===
Rank	Name	Team	Yards
1	Ron Johnson	Michigan	1,391
2	Leroy Keyes	Purdue	1,003
3	Jim Otis	Ohio State	985
4	Rich Johnson	Illinois	973
5	Ed Podolak	Iowa	937

=== Receiving yards ===
Rank	Name	Team	Yards
1	Jade Butcher	Indiana	713
2	Jim Mandich	Michigan	565
3	Bruce Hubbard	Northwestern	551
4	Al Bream	Iowa	518
5	Chip Litten	Minnesota	481

=== Total yards ===
Rank	Name	Team	Yards
1	Dennis Brown	Michigan	1,777
2	Dave Shelbourne	Northwestern	1,514
3	Rex Kern	Ohio State	1,506
4	Larry Lawrence	Iowa	1,468
5	Harry Gonso	Indiana	1,432

=== Scoring ===
Rank	Name	Team	Points
1	Ron Johnson	Michigan	114
2	Jim Otis	Ohio State	102
3	Leroy Keyes	Purdue	90
4	Jade Butcher	Indiana	60
4	Larry Lawrence	Iowa	60
4	Jim Carter	Minnesota	60

== Awards and honors ==
=== All-Big Ten honors ===
The following players were picked by the Associated Press (AP) and/or the United Press International (UPI) as first-team players on the 1968 All-Big Ten Conference football team.

Offense

Position	Name	Team	Selectors
Quarterback	Dennis Brown	Michigan	AP, UPI
Running back	Ron Johnson	Michigan	AP, UPI
Running back	Leroy Keyes	Purdue	AP, UPI
Running back	Ed Podolak	Iowa	AP
Running back	Perry Williams	Purdue	UPI
Offensive end	Jade Butcher	Indiana	AP, UPI
Offensive end	Jim Mandich	Michigan	AP, UPI
Offensive tackle	Rufus Mayes	Ohio State	AP, UPI
Offensive tackle	Dave Foley	Ohio State	AP, UPI
Offensive guard	Gary Roberts	Purdue	AP, UPI
Offensive guard	Jon Meskimen	Iowa	AP
Offensive guard	Dick Enderle	Minnesota	UPI
Center	Jack Rudnay	Northwestern	AP, UPI

Defense

Position	Name	Team	Selectors
Defensive end	Phil Seymour	Michigan	AP, UPI
Defensive end	Bob Stein	Minnesota	AP, UPI
Defensive tackle	Charles Bailey	Michigan State	AP
Defensive tackle	Tom Goss	Michigan	AP
Defensive tackle	Bill Yanchar	Purdue	UPI
Middle guard	Chuck Kyle	Purdue	AP, UPI [DT]
Linebacker	Ken Criter	Wisconsin	AP, UPI
Linebacker	Jack Tatum	Ohio State	AP, UPI
Linebacker	Noel Jenke	Minnesota	AP
Linebacker	Tom Stincic	Michigan	UPI
Defensive back	Al Brenner	Michigan State	AP, UPI
Defensive back	Tom Curtis	Michigan	AP, UPI
Defensive back	Ted Provost	Ohio State	AP
Defensive back	Nate Cunningham	Indiana	UPI

=== All-American honors ===
At the end of the 1968 season, three Big Ten players secured consensus first-team honors on the 1968 College Football All-America Team. The Big Ten's consensus All-Americans were:

Position	Name	Team	Selectors
Offensive end	Dave Foley	Ohio State	AFCA, AP, CP, FWAA, NEA, UPI, FN, Time, WCFF
Running back	Leroy Keyes	Purdue	AFCA, AP, CP, FWAA, NEA, UPI, FN, Time, TSN, WCFF
Middle guard	Chuck Kyle	Purdue	AFCA, CP, FWAA, UPI, WCFF

Other Big Ten players who were named first-team All-Americans by at least one selector were:

Position	Name	Team	Selectors
Offensive tackle	Rufus Mayes	Ohio State	Time, TSN
Running back	Ron Johnson	Michigan	FWAA, FN
Defensive tackle	Bob Stein	Minnesota	WCFF
Defensive back	Al Brenner	Michigan State	AFCA, NEA

=== Other awards ===
In December 1968, the Heisman Trophy was awarded to O. J. Simpson of USC. Two Big Ten players finished among the top six in the voting for the trophy. They were: Purdue running back Leroy Keyes (second) and Michigan running back Ron Johnson (sixth).

== 1969 NFL/AFL Draft ==
The following Big Ten players were among the first 100 picks in the 1969 NFL/AFL draft:

Name	Position	Team	Round	Overall pick
Leroy Keyes	Running back	Purdue	1	3
Rufus Mayes	Offensive tackle	Ohio State	1	14
Ron Johnson	Running back	Michigan	1	20
Dave Foley	Offensive tackle	Ohio State	1	26
Ed Podolak	Running back	Iowa	2	48
Tom Stincic	Linebacker	Michigan	3	68
Rich Johnson	Running back	Illinois	3	78
Dennis Hale	Defensive back	Minnesota	4	85
Jim Sniadecki	Linebacker	Indiana	4	86
Perry Williams	Running back	Purdue	4	90
