= 1968 Minnesota Golden Gophers football team =

American college football season

1968 Minnesota Golden Gophers football
- Conference: Big Ten Conference

Ranking
- Coaches: No. 18
- Record: 6–4 (5–2 Big Ten)
- Head coach: Murray Warmath (15th season)
- MVP: Wayne King
- Captain: Noel Jenke
- Home stadium: Memorial Stadium

1968 Big Ten Conference football standings
	Conf.					Overall
Team	W		L		T	W		L		T
No. 1 Ohio State $	7	–	0	–	0	10	–	0	–	0
No. 12 Michigan	6	–	1	–	0	8	–	2	–	0
No. 10 Purdue	5	–	2	–	0	8	–	2	–	0
Minnesota	5	–	2	–	0	6	–	4	–	0
Indiana	4	–	3	–	0	6	–	4	–	0
Iowa	4	–	3	–	0	5	–	5	–	0
Michigan State	2	–	5	–	0	5	–	5	–	0
Illinois	1	–	6	–	0	1	–	9	–	0
Northwestern	1	–	6	–	0	1	–	9	–	0
Wisconsin	0	–	7	–	0	0	–	10	–	0
$ – Conference champion; Rankings from AP Poll

The 1968 Minnesota Golden Gophers football team represented the University of Minnesota in the 1968 Big Ten Conference football season. In their 15th year under head coach Murray Warmath, the Golden Gophers compiled a 6–4 record and outscored their opponents by a combined total of 207 to 190.

Linebacker Wayne King received the team's Most Valuable Player award. End Bob Stein was named an All-American by the Walter Camp Football Foundation, Associated Press, United Press International and Football Writers Association of America. Stein, guard Dick Enderle and guard Noel Jenke were named All-Big Ten first team. Tackle Ezell Jones, defensive tackle Ron Kamzelski, tight end Ray Parson and safety Doug Roalstad were named All-Big Ten second team. Stein was named an Academic All-American. Stein, linebacker Noel Jenke, linebacker Wayne King and halfback Barry Mayer were named Academic All-Big Ten.

Total attendance at six home games was 312,806, an average of 52,134 per game. The largest crowd was against USC.

== Schedule ==
Date	Opponent	Rank	Site	Result	Attendance	Source
September 21	No. 2 USC*	No. 16	Memorial Stadium; Minneapolis, MN	L 20–29	60,820	
September 28	No. 9 Nebraska*	No. 17	Memorial Stadium; Minneapolis, MN (rivalry)	L 14–17	55,362	
October 5	Wake Forest*		Memorial Stadium; Minneapolis, MN	W 24–19	39,277	
October 12	Illinois^{†}		Memorial Stadium; Minneapolis, MN	W 17–10	49,864	
October 19	at Michigan State		Spartan Stadium; East Lansing, MI	W 14–13	74,321	
October 26	at No. 12 Michigan		Michigan Stadium; Ann Arbor, MI (Little Brown Jug)	L 20–33	69,384	
November 2	Iowa		Memorial Stadium; Minneapolis, MN (rivalry)	L 28–35	57,703	
November 9	No. 6 Purdue		Memorial Stadium; Minneapolis, MN	W 27–13	49,780	
November 16	at No. 19 Indiana		Seventeenth Street Football Stadium; Bloomington, IN	W 20–6	49,234	
November 23	at Wisconsin		Camp Randall Stadium; Madison, WI (rivalry)	W 23–15	39,214	
*Non-conference game; ^{†}Homecoming; Rankings from AP Poll released prior to the game

== Roster ==
1968 Minnesota Golden Gophers football team roster
Players
Coaches
Offense

Pos.	#	Name	Class
FB	34	Jim Carter	Jr
G	67	Dick Enderle	Sr

Defense

Pos.	#	Name	Class
DB	27	Jeff Wright	So

Special teams

Pos.	#	Name	Class

Head coach

- Murray Warmath

Coordinators/assistant coaches

Legend

- (C) Team captain
- (S) Suspended
- (I) Ineligible
- Injured
- Redshirt

Roster

== Game summaries ==
=== Michigan ===
Week 6: Minnesota at Michigan

Team	1	2	3	4	Total
Minnesota	0	0	0	20	20
• Michigan	12	18	3	0	33

- Date: October 26, 1968
- Location: Michigan Stadium
  Ann Arbor, MI
- Game attendance: 69,384
- Referee: Jerry Markbreit

On October 26, 1968, Minnesota lost to Michigan by a 33 to 20 score before a homecoming crowd of 69,384. The game was the 59th meeting in the Little Brown Jug rivalry. Michigan lost the 1967 game by a 20–15 score.

For Michigan, Dennis Brown completed 11 of 20 passes for 152 yards and two touchdowns, and Ron Johnson carried the ball 33 times for 84 yards and two touchdowns. Michigan led 30–0 at halftime and 33–0 at the start of the fourth quarter, but Minnesota mounted a comeback with 20 points in the fourth quarter with Michigan's reserves in the game. Michigan gained 252 rushing yards and 201 passing yards in the game. Minnesota gained 149 rushing yards and 200 passing yards.
