= 1968 Michigan State Spartans football team =

American college football season

1968 Michigan State Spartans football
- Conference: Big Ten Conference
- Record: 5–5 (2–5 Big Ten)
- Head coach: Duffy Daugherty (15th season)
- MVP: Al Brenner
- Captain: Al Brenner
- Home stadium: Spartan Stadium

1968 Big Ten Conference football standings
	Conf.					Overall
Team	W		L		T	W		L		T
No. 1 Ohio State $	7	–	0	–	0	10	–	0	–	0
No. 12 Michigan	6	–	1	–	0	8	–	2	–	0
No. 10 Purdue	5	–	2	–	0	8	–	2	–	0
Minnesota	5	–	2	–	0	6	–	4	–	0
Indiana	4	–	3	–	0	6	–	4	–	0
Iowa	4	–	3	–	0	5	–	5	–	0
Michigan State	2	–	5	–	0	5	–	5	–	0
Illinois	1	–	6	–	0	1	–	9	–	0
Northwestern	1	–	6	–	0	1	–	9	–	0
Wisconsin	0	–	7	–	0	0	–	10	–	0
$ – Conference champion; Rankings from AP Poll

The 1968 Michigan State Spartans football team was an American football team that represented Michigan State University as a member of the Big Ten Conference during the 1968 Big Ten football season. In their 15th season under head coach Duffy Daugherty, the Spartans compiled a 5–5 record (2–5 in conference games), finished seventh in the Big Ten, and were outscored by a total of 202 to 151. In three games against ranked opponents, the Spartans defeated No. 5 Notre Dame and lost to No. 2 Ohio State and No. 15 Purdue.

On offense, the Spartans gained 2,039 rushing yards (203.9 yards per game) and 1,217 passing yards (121.7 yards per game). On defense, they gave up 1,468 rushing yards (146.8 yards per game) and 1,665 passing yards (166.5 yards per game). The individual statistical leaders included quarterback Bill Triplett with 714 passing yards and 1,012 yards of total offense, Tommy Love with 729 rushing yards, split end Frank Foreman with 29 receptions and 456 receiving yards, quarterback Bill Feraco with 42 points scored (seven touchdowns), and linebacker Rich Saul with 84 total tackles.

Three Spartans were selected for the 1968 All-Big Ten Conference football teams. Defensive back Al Brenner was selected as a first-team player by both the Associated Press (AP) and the United Press International (UPI). Tackle Charles Bailey received first-team honors from the AP, and linebacker Rich Saul received second-team honors from both the AP and UPI. Wide receiver and defensive back Al Brenner was selected as the team's most valuable player.

The team played its home games at Spartan Stadium in East Lansing, Michigan.

== Schedule ==
Date	Opponent	Rank	Site	Result	Attendance	Source
September 21	Syracuse*		Spartan Stadium; East Lansing, MI	W 14–10	63,488	
September 28	Baylor*		Spartan Stadium; East Lansing, MI	W 28–10	64,826	
October 5	at Wisconsin	No. 19	Camp Randall Stadium; Madison, WI	W 39–0	49,067	
October 12	at Michigan	No. 12	Michigan Stadium; Ann Arbor, MI (rivalry)	L 14–28	102,785	
October 19	Minnesota^{†}		Spartan Stadium; East Lansing, MI	L 13–14	74,321	
October 26	No. 5 Notre Dame*		Spartan Stadium; East Lansing, MI (rivalry)	W 21–17	77,339	
November 2	at No. 2 Ohio State	No. 16	Ohio Stadium; Columbus, OH	L 20–25	84,859	
November 9	Indiana	No. 17	Spartan Stadium; East Lansing, MI (rivalry)	L 22–24	65,841	
November 16	No. 15 Purdue		Spartan Stadium; East Lansing, MI	L 0–9	68,362	
November 23	at Northwestern		Dyche Stadium; Evanston, IL	W 31–14	28,245	
*Non-conference game; ^{†}Homecoming; Rankings from AP Poll released prior to the game

== Game summaries ==
=== Michigan ===
Week 4: Michigan State at Michigan

Team	1	2	3	4	Total
Michigan State	6	0	0	8	14
• Michigan	13	0	0	15	28

- Date: October 12, 1968
- Location: Michigan Stadium
  Ann Arbor, MI
- Game attendance: 103,785
- Referee: Eugene Calhoun

On October 12, 1968, Michigan State lost to Michigan by a 28 to 14 score. The game was the 61st meeting in the Michigan–Michigan State football rivalry. The Spartans had won three consecutive games from 1965 to 1967, and the Wolverines came into the 1968 game as an unranked underdog facing an undefeated Spartans team that had routed Wisconsin 39-0 the prior week and was ranked #12 in the AP Poll.

Michigan quarterback Dennis Brown completed 9 of 15 passes for 177 yards and two touchdowns. Jim Mandich caught four passes for 125 yards, including a 53-yard touchdown reception, and John Gabler also caught a touchdown pass. Ron Johnson carried the ball 19 times for 152 yards and a touchdown. Fullback Garvie Craw also ran 25 yards for a touchdown and caught a pass from Brown for a two-point conversion. Tim Killian also kicked two extra points for Michigan. Michigan gained 420 yards in the game, 243 rushing and 177 passing. Michigan State gained 356 yards, 295 rushing and 61 passing.

After defeating Michigan State, the Wolverines were ranked No. 17 in the weekly AP Poll. It was the first time since early in the 1966 season that Michigan had been ranked.

== Personnel ==
- DT No. 61 Charles Bailey, Sr.
