= 1968 Wisconsin Badgers football team =

American college football season

1968 Wisconsin Badgers football
- Conference: Big Ten Conference
- Record: 0–10 (0–7 Big Ten)
- Head coach: John Coatta (2nd season)
- MVP: Ken Criter
- Captain: Wally Schoessow
- Home stadium: Camp Randall Stadium

1968 Big Ten Conference football standings
| | Conf. | | | | | Overall |
| Team | W | | L | | T | W | | L | | T |
|---|---|---|---|---|---|---|---|---|---|---|
| No. 1 Ohio State $ | 7 | – | 0 | – | 0 | 10 | – | 0 | – | 0 |
| No. 12 Michigan | 6 | – | 1 | – | 0 | 8 | – | 2 | – | 0 |
| No. 10 Purdue | 5 | – | 2 | – | 0 | 8 | – | 2 | – | 0 |
| Minnesota | 5 | – | 2 | – | 0 | 6 | – | 4 | – | 0 |
| Indiana | 4 | – | 3 | – | 0 | 6 | – | 4 | – | 0 |
| Iowa | 4 | – | 3 | – | 0 | 5 | – | 5 | – | 0 |
| Michigan State | 2 | – | 5 | – | 0 | 5 | – | 5 | – | 0 |
| Illinois | 1 | – | 6 | – | 0 | 1 | – | 9 | – | 0 |
| Northwestern | 1 | – | 6 | – | 0 | 1 | – | 9 | – | 0 |
| Wisconsin | 0 | – | 7 | – | 0 | 0 | – | 10 | – | 0 |
$ – Conference champion; Rankings from AP Poll

The 1968 Wisconsin Badgers football team was an American football team that represented the University of Wisconsin as a member of the Big Ten Conference during the 1968 Big Ten season. In their second year under head coach John Coatta, the Badgers compiled a 0–10 record (0–7 in conference games), finished in last place in the Big Ten, and were outscored by a total of 310 to 86.

The Badgers gained an average of 112.8 passing yards and 126.2 rushing yards per game. On defense, they gave up an average of 142.3 passing yards and 259.0 rushing yards per game. The team's individual statistical leaders included: quarterback John Ryan (855 passing yards); running back Wayne Todd (364 rushing yards); and wide receiver Mel Reddick (34 receptions for 375 yards).

Wally Schoessow was the team captain. Linebacker Ken Criter was selected as the team's most valuable player. Criter also won first-team All-Big Ten honors from the Associated Press and United Press International.

The Badgers played their home games at Camp Randall Stadium in Madison, Wisconsin. This was the first season of artificial turf at Camp Randall Stadium; the Tartan Turf home opener was against Washington of the Pacific-8 Conference, who had just installed AstroTurf at their Husky Stadium in Seattle. Outside of these two, the only other University Division venues with synthetic turf in 1968 were the Astrodome (Houston) and Neyland Stadium (Tennessee).

== Schedule ==
| Date | Opponent | Site | Result | Attendance | Source |
|---|---|---|---|---|---|
| September 21 | at Arizona State* | Sun Devil Stadium; Tempe, AZ | L 7–55 | 43,317 | |
| September 28 | Washington* | Camp Randall Stadium; Madison, WI | L 17–21 | 42,965 | |
| October 5 | No. 19 Michigan State | Camp Randall Stadium; Madison, WI | L 0–39 | 49,067 | |
| October 12 | Utah State* | Camp Randall Stadium; Madison, WI | L 0–20 | 37,469 | |
| October 19 | at Iowa | Iowa Stadium; Iowa City, IA (rivalry) | L 0–41 | 45,651 | |
| October 26 | at Northwestern | Dyche Stadium; Evanston, IL | L 10–13 | 33,133 | |
| November 2 | Indiana^{†} | Camp Randall Stadium; Madison, WI | L 20–21 | 51,666 | |
| November 9 | No. 2 Ohio State | Camp Randall Stadium; Madison, WI | L 8–43 | 40,972 | |
| November 16 | at No. 4 Michigan | Michigan Stadium; Ann Arbor, MI | L 9–34 | 51,117 | |
| November 23 | Minnesota | Camp Randall Stadium; Madison, WI (rivalry) | L 15–23 | 39,214 | |
*Non-conference game; ^{†}Homecoming; Rankings from AP Poll released prior to the game

== Roster ==
1968 Wisconsin Badgers football team roster
Players
Coaches
Offense

| Pos. | # | Name | Class |
|---|---|---|---|
| RB | 36 | Joe Dawkins | Jr |
| OT | 70 | Mike McClish |
| WR | 18 | Tom McCauley | Sr |
| QB | 15 | John Ryan | Sr |
| TE | 40 | Stu Voigt | Jr |

Defense

| Pos. | # | Name | Class |
|---|---|---|---|
| LB | 33 | Ken Criter | Sr |
| DT | 73 | Jim DeLisle | So |
| DT | 76 | Bill Gregory | So |
| DT | 57 | Jim Novak | Sr |
| LB | 35 | Chuck Winfrey | So |
| DB | 30 | George McGarrett |

Special teams

| Pos. | # | Name | Class |

Head coach

- John Coatta (2nd year)

Coordinators/assistant coaches

- Harland Carl
- Gene Felker
- Roger French
- Fred Marsh
- Kirk Mee
- Les Ritcherson
- Deral Teteak
- LaVern Van Dyke

Legend

- (C) Team captain
- (S) Suspended
- (I) Ineligible
- Injured
- Redshirt

== NFL/AFL draft selections ==
Two Wisconsin Badgers were selected in the 1969 NFL/AFL draft, which lasted 17 rounds with 442 selections.

| Player | Position | Round | Overall | Franchise |
|---|---|---|---|---|
| Lynn Buss | Linebacker | 9th | 218 | Philadelphia Eagles |
| Tom McCauley | Wide receiver | 10th | 253 | Minnesota Vikings |
