= 1968 Iowa Hawkeyes football team =

American college football season

1968 Iowa Hawkeyes football
- Conference: Big Ten Conference
- Record: 5–5 (4–3 Big Ten)
- Head coach: Ray Nagel (3rd season)
- MVP: Ed Podolak
- Captains: Ed Podolak; Steve Wilson
- Home stadium: Iowa Stadium

1968 Big Ten Conference football standings
	Conf.					Overall
Team	W		L		T	W		L		T
No. 1 Ohio State $	7	–	0	–	0	10	–	0	–	0
No. 12 Michigan	6	–	1	–	0	8	–	2	–	0
No. 10 Purdue	5	–	2	–	0	8	–	2	–	0
Minnesota	5	–	2	–	0	6	–	4	–	0
Indiana	4	–	3	–	0	6	–	4	–	0
Iowa	4	–	3	–	0	5	–	5	–	0
Michigan State	2	–	5	–	0	5	–	5	–	0
Illinois	1	–	6	–	0	1	–	9	–	0
Northwestern	1	–	6	–	0	1	–	9	–	0
Wisconsin	0	–	7	–	0	0	–	10	–	0
$ – Conference champion; Rankings from AP Poll

The 1968 Iowa Hawkeyes football team was an American football team that represented the University of Iowa as a member of the Big Ten Conference during the 1968 Big Ten football season. In their third year under head coach Ray Nagel, the Hawkeyes compiled a 5–5 record (4–3 in conference game), tied for fifth place in the Big Ten, and outscored opponents by a total of 322 to 289.

The 1968 Hawkeyes gained 2,528 rushing yards and 1,876 passing yards. On defense, they gave up 2,819 rushing yards and 1,283 passing yards. They broke Big Ten scoring and total offense records.

The team's statistical leaders included quarterback Larry Lawrence (88-of-156 passing, 1,307 yards, 60 points scored), Ed Podolak (937 rushing yards), and Ray Manning (35 receptions for 426 yards). Podolak set a new Iowa single-game record with 286 rushing yards on 17 carries against Northwestern. Podolak and defensive back Steve Wilson were the team captains. Podolak was selected as the team's most valuable player.

The team played its home games at Iowa Stadium in Iowa City, Iowa. Home attendance totaled 294,126, an average of 49,021 per game.

== Schedule ==
Date	Opponent	Site	Result	Attendance	Source
September 21	No. 8 Oregon State*	Iowa Stadium; Iowa City, IA	W 21–20	46,892	
September 28	at TCU*	Amon G. Carter Stadium; Fort Worth, TX	L 17–28	25,000	
October 5	No. 5 Notre Dame*	Iowa Stadium; Iowa City, IA	L 28–51	58,043	
October 12	Indiana^{†}	Iowa Stadium; Iowa City, IA	L 34–38	54,633	
October 19	Wisconsin	Iowa Stadium; Iowa City, IA (rivalry)	W 41–0	45,651	
October 26	at No. 7 Purdue	Ross–Ade Stadium; West Lafayette, IN	L 14–44	61,927	
November 2	at Minnesota	Memorial Stadium; Minneapolis, MN (rivalry)	W 35–28	57,703	
November 9	Northwestern	Iowa Stadium; Iowa City, IA	W 68–34	44,876	
November 16	No. 2 Ohio State	Iowa Stadium; Iowa City, IA	L 27–33	44,131	
November 23	at Illinois	Memorial Stadium; Champaign, IL	W 37–13	35,055	
*Non-conference game; ^{†}Homecoming; Rankings from AP Poll released prior to the game

== Game summaries ==
=== Oregon State ===
Oregon State at Iowa

Team	1	2	3	4	Total
No. 8 Beavers	14	6	0	0	20
• Hawkeyes	7	7	0	7	21

- Date: September 21
- Location: Iowa Stadium
  Iowa City, IA
- Game attendance: 46,892

Scoring summary
1		OSU	TD (Arnold kick)	OSU 7–0
1		OSU	TD (Arnold kick)	OSU 14–0
1		Iowa	Podolak 2-yard run (Melendez kick)	OSU 14–7
2		Iowa	Podolak 10-yard run (Melendez kick)	Tied 14–14
2	8:36	OSU	Rich 1-yard run (kick failed)	OSU 20–14
4		Iowa	Dennis Green run (Melendez kick)	Iowa 21–20

=== Northwestern ===
Northwestern at Iowa

Team	1	2	3	4	Total
Wildcats	7	7	14	6	34
• Hawkeyes	14	28	7	19	68

- Date: November 9
- Location: Iowa Stadium
  Iowa City, IA
- Game attendance: 44,876

Scoring summary
1	Iowa	Sullivan 3-yard run (Melendez kick)	Iowa 7–0
1	Iowa	Podolak 60-yard run (Melendez kick)	Iowa 14–0
1	NW	Kurzawski 32-yard pass from Shelbourne (Emmerich kick)	Iowa 14–7
2	Iowa	Podolak 32-yard run (Melendez kick)	Iowa 21–7
2	Iowa	Lawrence 7-yard run (Melendez kick)	Iowa 28–7
2	Iowa	Sullivan 9-yard run (Melendez kick)	Iowa 35–7
2	Iowa	Manning 19-yard pass from Cilek (Melendez kick)	Iowa 42–7
2	NW	Emmerich 1-yard run (Emmerich kick)	Iowa 42–14
3	Iowa	Reardon 95-yard kick return (Melendez kick)	Iowa 49–14
3	NW	Smeeton 1-yard run (Emmerich kick)	Iowa 49–21
3	NW	TD (Emmerich kick)	Iowa 49–28
4	Iowa	Sullivan 11-yard run (kick failed)	Iowa 55–28
4	Iowa	Manning 6-yard pass from Cilek (pass failed)	Iowa 61–28
4	Iowa	Green 19-yard pass from Cilek (Melendez kick)	Iowa 68–28
4	NW	Emmerich 3-yard run (pass failed)	Iowa 68–34

It was a record-setting day for the Hawkeyes. Iowa established a Big Ten record for total offense with 639 yards (431 rushing). Ed Podolak rushed for 286 yards (setting Iowa and Big Ten records) and two touchdowns on 17 carries. His performance still ranks #2 on Iowa's single-game rushing list.

=== Ohio State ===
No. 2 Ohio State at Iowa

Team	1	2	3	4	Total
• No. 2 Buckeyes	6	6	14	7	33
Hawkeyes	0	0	6	21	27

- Date: November 16
- Location:
  Kinnick Stadium
  Iowa City, IA
- Game start: 1:30 p.m. CST
- Game attendance: 44,131
- Game weather: 38 °F (3 °C), Rain, Wind E 12 mph

Scoring summary
Q1	12:13	OSU	Otis 7 yard run (kick failed)	OSU 6-0
Q2	6:42	OSU	Kern 3 yard run (pass failed)	OSU 12-0
Q3	10:40	OSU	Otis 1 yard run (Roman kick)	OSU 19-0
Q3	6:45	IOWA	Lawrence 1 yard run (kick failed)	OSU 19-6
Q3	1:19	OSU	Kern 1 yard run (Zelina kick)	OSU 26-6
Q4	8:59	IOWA	Podolak 3 yard run (Melendez kick)	OSU 26-13
Q4	7:07	OSU	Brockington 22 yard run (Roman kick)	OSU 33-13
Q4	4:02	IOWA	Manning 12 yard pass from Lawrence (Melendez kick)	OSU 33-20
Q4	:09	IOWA	Reardon 9 yard pass from Lawrence (Melendez kick)	OSU 33-27

=== At Illinois ===
After winning only 4 games combined over the previous three seasons, the Hawkeyes earned their 5th victory of the season.

== Roster ==
1968 Iowa Hawkeyes football team roster
Players
Coaches
Offense

Pos.	#	Name	Class
QB	10	Larry Lawrence	So
RB	14	Ed Podolak	Sr
RB	44	Dennis Green	So
WR	22	Kerry Reardon	So

Defense

Pos.	#	Name	Class

Special teams

Pos.	#	Name	Class
K		Marcos Melendez

Head coach

- Ray Nagel

Coordinators/assistant coaches

Legend

- (C) Team captain
- (S) Suspended
- (I) Ineligible
- Injured
- Redshirt
