= 1968 Michigan Wolverines football team =

American college football season

1968 Michigan Wolverines football
- Conference: Big Ten Conference

Ranking
- Coaches: No. 15
- AP: No. 12
- Record: 8–2 (6–1 Big Ten)
- Head coach: Bump Elliott (10th season)
- Offensive coordinator: Tony Mason
- Defensive coordinator: Henry Fonde
- MVP: Ron Johnson
- Captain: Ron Johnson
- Home stadium: Michigan Stadium

1968 Big Ten Conference football standings
| | Conf. | | | | | Overall |
| Team | W | | L | | T | W | | L | | T |
|---|---|---|---|---|---|---|---|---|---|---|
| No. 1 Ohio State $ | 7 | – | 0 | – | 0 | 10 | – | 0 | – | 0 |
| No. 12 Michigan | 6 | – | 1 | – | 0 | 8 | – | 2 | – | 0 |
| No. 10 Purdue | 5 | – | 2 | – | 0 | 8 | – | 2 | – | 0 |
| Minnesota | 5 | – | 2 | – | 0 | 6 | – | 4 | – | 0 |
| Indiana | 4 | – | 3 | – | 0 | 6 | – | 4 | – | 0 |
| Iowa | 4 | – | 3 | – | 0 | 5 | – | 5 | – | 0 |
| Michigan State | 2 | – | 5 | – | 0 | 5 | – | 5 | – | 0 |
| Illinois | 1 | – | 6 | – | 0 | 1 | – | 9 | – | 0 |
| Northwestern | 1 | – | 6 | – | 0 | 1 | – | 9 | – | 0 |
| Wisconsin | 0 | – | 7 | – | 0 | 0 | – | 10 | – | 0 |
$ – Conference champion; Rankings from AP Poll

The 1968 Michigan Wolverines football team represented the University of Michigan in the 1968 Big Ten Conference football season. In their tenth and final season under head coach Bump Elliott, the Wolverines compiled an 8–2 record, outscored opponents 277 to 155, and finished the season in second place in the Big Ten Conference and ranked No. 12 in the final AP Poll. After losing the season opener to California, the Wolverines won their next eight games by a combined score of 256 to 84. The team rose to No. 4 in the AP poll before losing to Ohio State by a 50–14 score in the final game of the season.

On November 16, 1968, Michigan running back Ron Johnson set an NCAA record with 347 rushing yards against Wisconsin. He also finished his career with a school record 2,524 rushing yards. At the end of the year, Johnson was selected as Michigan's most valuable player and a first-team All-American. He also won the Chicago Tribune Silver Football trophy as the most valuable player in the Big Ten.

Defensive back Tom Curtis set a new Big Ten record with 10 interceptions in 1968 and was selected as a first-team All-Big Ten player. Michigan's other first-team All-Big Ten players included Johnson, quarterback Dennis Brown, and ends Jim Mandich and Phil Seymour.

== Schedule ==
| Date | Opponent | Rank | Site | Result | Attendance | Source |
|---|---|---|---|---|---|---|
| September 21 | California* | | Michigan Stadium; Ann Arbor, MI | L 7–21 | 71,386 | |
| September 28 | at Duke* | | Wallace Wade Stadium; Durham, NC | W 31–10 | 25,000 | |
| October 5 | Navy* | | Michigan Stadium; Ann Arbor, MI | W 32–9 | 56,501 | |
| October 12 | No. 12 Michigan State | | Michigan Stadium; Ann Arbor, MI (rivalry) | W 28–14 | 102,785 | |
| October 19 | at No. 19 Indiana | No. 18 | Seventeenth Street Stadium; Bloomington, IN | W 27–22 | 51,951 | |
| October 26 | Minnesota^{†} | No. 12 | Michigan Stadium; Ann Arbor, MI (Little Brown Jug) | W 33–20 | 69,384 | |
| November 2 | at Northwestern | No. 9 | Dyche Stadium; Evanston, IL (rivalry) | W 35–0 | 40,101 | |
| November 9 | Illinois | No. 7 | Michigan Stadium; Ann Arbor, MI (rivalry) | W 36–0 | 56,775 | |
| November 16 | Wisconsin | No. 4 | Michigan Stadium; Ann Arbor, MI | W 34–9 | 51,117 | |
| November 23 | at No. 2 Ohio State | No. 4 | Ohio Stadium; Columbus, OH (rivalry) | L 14–50 | 85,371 | |
*Non-conference game; ^{†}Homecoming; Rankings from AP Poll released prior to the game

== Season summary ==
=== Preseason ===
The 1967 Michigan team compiled a 4–6 (3–4 Big Ten) record. After compiling a 14–16 record since 1964, Elliott became the subject of a "Dump Bump" campaign among Michigan alumni.

Two key players returned to the 1968 team as senior leaders on offense. Halfback Ron Johnson rushed for over 1,000 yards in 1967 and was selected as a second-team All-American, and quarterback Dennis Brown in 1967 broke the Big Ten Conference record for total offense.

In late 1967, Fritz Crisler, who had been Michigan's athletic director since 1941, announced that he would retire effective June 30, 1968. On March 15, 1968, Don Canham, who had been Michigan's track coach since 1948, was selected to replace Crisler as Michigan's athletic director.

In early April 1968, Ron Johnson was selected as the captain of the 1968 team. He was the first African-American to receive the honor.

=== Recruiting ===
In his final year as Michigan's head coach, Bump Elliott secured one of the strongest recruiting classes in Michigan football history. Michigan's 1968 recruits included:

- Guard Reggie McKenzie, who starred on Bo Schembechler's early Michigan teams and was later inducted into the College Football Hall of Fame;
- Tight end Paul Seymour, who became a consensus All-American under Schembechler in 1972;
- Linebacker Mike Taylor, who became a consensus All-American in 1971;
- Defensive back Thom Darden, who became a first-team All-American in 1971 and later played 10 year in the NFL;
- Wide receiver Glenn Doughty, who went on to play for the Baltimore Colts from 1972 to 1979;
- Defensive end Tom Beckman, who played three years in the NFL;
- Running back Billy Taylor, who broke Michigan's career rushing record;
- Linebacker Mike Keller, who became a first-team All-Big Ten player in 1971 and played in the NFL for two years;
- Offensive lineman Guy Murdock, who was an All-Big Ten player in 1970 and 1971 and played three seasons of professional football;
- Fullback Fritz Seyferth, who later played in the Canadian Football League;
- Tight end Tom Huiskens, who was Male High School Athlete of the Year for the State of Michigan for the 1967–68 academic year; and
- Offensive tackle Jim Brandstatter, who later gained fame as a sports broadcaster.

=== Week 1: California ===
Week 1: California at Michigan

| Team | 1 | 2 | 3 | 4 | Total |
|---|---|---|---|---|---|
| • California | 14 | 0 | 0 | 7 | 21 |
| Michigan | 0 | 7 | 0 | 0 | 7 |

- Date: September 21, 1968
- Location: Michigan Stadium
  Ann Arbor, Michigan
- Game attendance: 71,368
- Referee: Jerry Markbreit

On September 21, 1968, Michigan opened its season at Michigan Stadium with a loss to California by a 21 to 7 score. The game was the sixth meeting between the two programs, including a four-game series from 1965 to 1968. Michigan had won the first four games, but had lost the 1967 game by a 10 to 9 score.

California halfback Gary Fowler scored twice in the opening quarter on runs of 12 and 6 yards to give California a 14 to 0 lead. Michigan scored in the second quarter on an eight-yard pass from Dennis Brown to Jim Mandich. Tim Killian kicked the point after touchdown. Fowler scored again on a 12-yard run in the fourth quarter to extend California's lead. Michigan was held to 99 rushing yards and 135 passing yards in the game. California gained 240 rushing yards and 40 passing yards.

Michigan's starting lineup against California was Mandich (left end), Bob Penska (left tackle), Bob Baumgartner (left guard), Dave Denzin (center), Stan Broadnax (right guard), Dan Dierdorf (right tackle), Jerry Imsland (right end), Brown (quarterback), John Gabler (left halfback), Ron Johnson (right halfback), and Garvie Craw (fullback).

=== Week 2: at Duke ===
Week 2: Michigan at Duke

| Team | 1 | 2 | 3 | 4 | Total |
|---|---|---|---|---|---|
| • Michigan | 7 | 7 | 3 | 14 | 31 |
| Duke | 0 | 7 | 3 | 0 | 10 |

- Date: September 28, 1968
- Location: Wallace Wade Stadium, Durham, North Carolina
- Game attendance: 25,000

On September 28, 1968, Michigan defeated Duke by a 31 to 10 score in front of a crowd of 25,000 spectators at Wallace Wade Stadium in Durham, North Carolina. The game was the fourth meeting between the two programs. Michigan had won the prior three games, including the 1968 game by a 10 to 7 score.

Michigan halfback Ron Johnson gained 205 rushing yards (189 yards in the first half alone) and scored two touchdowns on runs of 53 yards in the second quarter and one yard in the fourth quarter. Michigan's other two touchdowns were scored by Jerry Imsland (23-yard pass from Dennis Brown in the first quarter) and Marty Huff (44-yard interception return in the fourth quarter). Tim Killian kicked a 25-yard field goal in the third quarter and converted four points after touchdown.

Michigan's starting lineup against Duke was Jim Mandich (left end), Bob Penska (left tackle), Bob Baumgartner (left guard), Dave Denzin (center), Stan Broadnax (right guard), Dan Dierdorf (right tackle), Bill Harris (right end), Brown (quarterback), John Gabler (left halfback), Johnson (right halfback), and Garvie Craw (fullback).

=== Week 3: Navy ===
Week 3: Navy at Michigan

| Team | 1 | 2 | 3 | 4 | Total |
|---|---|---|---|---|---|
| Navy | 3 | 0 | 0 | 6 | 9 |
| • Michigan | 0 | 19 | 6 | 7 | 32 |

- Date: October 5, 1968
- Location: Michigan Stadium
  Ann Arbor, Michigan
- Game attendance: 56,501
- Referee: Robert Van Lenges

On October 5, 1968, Michigan defeated Navy by a 32 to 9 score in front of a crowd of 56,501 spectators at Michigan Stadium. The game was the 11th meeting between the Michigan and Navy programs. Michigan had a record of 4-5-1 in the prior meetings and had lost the 1967 game by a 26 to 21 score. Michigan's dominating performance against Navy led David Condon to write in the Chicago Tribune: "Today the Wolverines were like the old champions of the west. Today they were the glorious Wolverines of days gone by. This was Michigan."

Ron Johnson gained 121 yards on 22 carries. Michigan's five touchdowns were scored as follows: two-yard run by Johnson in the second quarter; three-yard run by Dennis Brown in the second quarter; 19-yard pass from Brown to Jim Mandich in the second quarter; 39-yard run by Johnson in the third quarter; and one-yard run by Greg Harrison in the fourth quarter. George Hoey returned a punt 63 yards to set up Johnson's first touchdown and returned another punt 36 yards to set up Brown's touchdown pass to Mandich. Hoey also intercepted two Navy passes, returning one of them 48 yards. Tim Killian kicked two out of five extra point attempts and missed a field goal attempt. Navy did not score its lone touchdown until 30 seconds remained in the game, while Michigan's reserves were on the field. Michigan gained 185 rushing yard and 175 passing yards in the game. Navy gained 92 rushing yards and 247 passing yards

Michigan's starting lineup against Navy was Mandich (left end), Bob Penska (left tackle), Dick Caldarazzo (left guard), Dave Denzin (center), Stan Broadnax (right guard), Dan Dierdorf (right tackle), Jerry Imsland (right end), Brown (quarterback), Paul Staroba (left halfback), Johnson (right halfback), and Garvie Craw (fullback).

=== Week 4: Michigan State ===
Week 4: Michigan State at Michigan

| Team | 1 | 2 | 3 | 4 | Total |
|---|---|---|---|---|---|
| Michigan State | 6 | 0 | 0 | 8 | 14 |
| • Michigan | 13 | 0 | 0 | 15 | 28 |

- Date: October 12, 1968
- Location: Michigan Stadium
  Ann Arbor, Michigan
- Game attendance: 103,785
- Referee: Eugene Calhoun

On October 12, 1968, Michigan defeated Duffy Daugherty's Michigan State Spartans by a 28 to 14 score. The game was the 61st meeting in the Michigan–Michigan State football rivalry. The Spartans had won three consecutive games from 1965 to 1967, and the Wolverines came into the 1968 game as an unranked underdog facing an undefeated Spartans team that had routed Wisconsin 39-0 the prior week and was ranked #12 in the AP Poll.

Michigan quarterback Dennis Brown completed 9 of 15 passes for 177 yards and two touchdowns. Jim Mandich caught four passes for 125 yards, including a 53-yard touchdown reception, and John Gabler also caught a touchdown pass. Ron Johnson carried the ball 19 times for 152 yards and a touchdown. Fullback Garvie Craw also ran 25 yards for a touchdown and caught a pass from Brown for a two-point conversion. Tim Killian also kicked two extra points for Michigan. Michigan gained 420 yards in the game, 243 rushing and 177 passing. Michigan State gained 356 yards, 295 rushing and 61 passing.

After defeating Michigan State, the Wolverines were ranked #17 in the weekly AP poll. It was the first time since early in the 1966 season that Michigan had been ranked.

Michigan's starting lineup against Michigan State was Jerry Imsland (left end), Bob Penska (left tackle), Dick Caldarazzo (left guard), Dave Denzin (center), Stan Broadnax (right guard), Dan Dierdorf (right tackle), Mandich (right end), Brown (quarterback), Johnson (left halfback), Gabler (right halfback), and Craw (fullback).

=== Week 5: at Indiana ===
Week 5: Michigan at Indiana

| Team | 1 | 2 | 3 | 4 | Total |
|---|---|---|---|---|---|
| • Michigan | 7 | 0 | 13 | 7 | 27 |
| Indiana | 0 | 7 | 9 | 6 | 22 |

- Date: October 19, 1968
- Location: Memorial Stadium, Bloomington, Indiana
- Game attendance: 51,951
- Referee: R. E. Meyer

On October 19, 1968, Michigan defeated Indiana by a 27 to 22 score. The game was the 29th meeting between the two programs. Michigan lost the 1967 game by a 27 to 20 score.

Michigan quarterback Dennis Brown completed 14 of 30 passes for 162 yards and two touchdowns. John Gabler and Bill Harris were on the receiving end of Brown's touchdown throws in the third and fourth quarters, respectively. Ron Johnson gained 163 rushing yards and scored one touchdown on 34 carries. Indiana mistakes on consecutive plays led to two Michigan touchdowns in the third quarter: Jerry Hartman returned an interception 62 yards for a touchdown; Indiana fumbled the kickoff following Hartman's touchdown, and Ed Moore recovered for Michigan at the Indiana 19-yard line. Gabler scored four plays later on a pass from Brown. Tim Killian kicked three points after touchdown from Michigan.

Michigan's starting lineup against Indiana was Jim Mandich (left end), Bob Penska (left tackle), Dick Coldarazzo (left guard), Dave Denzin (center), Stan Broadnax (right guard), Dan Dierdorf (right tackle), Jerry Imsland (right end), Brown (quarterback), Jim Betts (left halfback), Johnson (right halfback), and Garvie Craw (fullback).

=== Week 6: Minnesota ===
Week 6: Minnesota at Michigan

| Team | 1 | 2 | 3 | 4 | Total |
|---|---|---|---|---|---|
| Minnesota | 0 | 0 | 0 | 20 | 20 |
| • Michigan | 12 | 18 | 3 | 0 | 33 |

- Date: October 26, 1968
- Location: Michigan Stadium
  Ann Arbor, Michigan
- Game attendance: 69,384
- Referee: Jerry Markbreit

On October 26, 1968, Michigan defeated Minnesota by a 33 to 20 score before a homecoming crowd of 69,384. The game was the 59th meeting in the Little Brown Jug rivalry. Michigan lost the 1967 game by a 20-15 score.

Dennis Brown completed 11 of 20 passes for 152 yards and two touchdowns. Bill Harris caught three passes for 85 yards and a touchdown, and Paul Staroba also caught a touchdown pass. Ron Johnson carried the ball 33 times for 84 yards and two touchdowns. Tim Killian also kicked three field goals (24, 32, and 31 yards) for Michigan. Michigan led 30-0 at halftime and 33-0 at the start of the fourth quarter, but Minnesota mounted a comeback with 20 points in the fourth quarter with Michigan's reserves in the game. Michigan gained 252 rushing yards and 201 passing yards in the game. Minnesota gained 149 rushing yards and 200 passing yards.

Michigan's starting lineup against Illinois was Jim Mandich (left end), Bob Penska (left tackle), Dick Caldarazzo (left guard), Dave Denzin (center), Stan Broadnax (right guard), Dan Dierdorf (right tackle), Jerry Imsland (right end), Dennis Brown (quarterback), Johnson (left halfback), John Gabler (right halfback), and Garvie Craw (fullback).

=== Week 7: at Northwestern ===
Week 7: Michigan at Northwestern

| Team | 1 | 2 | 3 | 4 | Total |
|---|---|---|---|---|---|
| • Michigan | 0 | 28 | 0 | 7 | 35 |
| Northwestern | 0 | 0 | 0 | 0 | 0 |

- Date: November 2, 1968
- Location: Dyche Stadium, Evanston, Illinois
- Game attendance: 40,101
- Referee: Eugene Calhoun

On November 2, 1968, Michigan defeated Northwestern by a 35 to 0 score at Dyche Stadium in Evanston, Illinois. The game was the 41st meeting between the programs. Michigan had won five of the prior six meetings, including the 1967 game.

Michigan scored 28 points in the second quarter (21 of them within 73 second), including two touchdowns on short runs by Ron Johnson, another on a 50-yard interception return by Dan Parks, and another on a four-yard pass from Dennis Brown to Bill Harris. The Wolverines scored again in the fourth quarter on a short run by Lance Scheffler. Tim Killian kicked three points after touchdown, and Brown passed to Johnson for a two-point conversion in the second quarter. Ron Johnson rushed for 129 yards and two touchdowns on 24 carries. Tom Curtis intercepted two passes in the game.

Michigan's starting lineup against Northwestern was Bill Harris (left end), Bob Penska (left tackle), Dick Coldarazzo (left guard), Dave Denzin (center), Stan Broadnax (right guard), Dan Dierdorf (right tackle), Jim Mandich (right end), Brown (quarterback), Johnson (left halfback), John Gabler (right halfback), and Garvie Craw (fullback).

=== Week 8: Illinois ===
Week 8: Illinois at Michigan

| Team | 1 | 2 | 3 | 4 | Total |
|---|---|---|---|---|---|
| Illinois | 0 | 0 | 0 | 0 | 0 |
| • Michigan | 6 | 14 | 9 | 7 | 36 |

- Date: November 9, 1968
- Location: Michigan Stadium
  Ann Arbor, Michigan
- Game attendance: 56,775
- Referee: Ross Dean

On November 9, 1968, Michigan defeated Illinois by a 36 to 0 score at Michigan Stadium. The game was the 54th meeting between the programs and matched head coach Bump Elliott against his brother Pete Elliott, the Illinois coach. Michigan had won eight of the prior nine meetings, including the 1967 game.

Dennis Brown completed 13 of 27 passes for 226 yards and two touchdowns, ran for a two-point conversion, and also rushed for 45 yards. Jim Mandich led the receivers with seven catches for 84 yards, while touchdown catches were made by Billy Harris (69-yard pass from Brown), Paul Staroba (14-yard pass from Brown), and Mike Hankwitz (six-yard pass from Don Moorhead). Ron Johnson rushed for 51 yards and two touchdowns on 19 carries. Tim Killian kicked a 26-yard field goal and a point after touchdown

Michigan's starting lineup against Illinois was Jim Mandich (left end), Bob Penska (left tackle), Dick Caldarazzo (left guard), Dave Denzin (center), Stan Broadnax (right guard), Dan Dierdorf (right tackle), Jerry Imsland (right end), Dennis Brown (quarterback), John Gabler (left halfback), Johnson (right halfback), and Garvie Craw (fullback).

=== Week 9: Wisconsin ===
Week 9: Wisconsin at Michigan

| Team | 1 | 2 | 3 | 4 | Total |
|---|---|---|---|---|---|
| Wisconsin | 6 | 3 | 0 | 0 | 9 |
| • Michigan | 7 | 0 | 20 | 7 | 34 |

- Date: November 16, 1968
- Location: Michigan Stadium
  Ann Arbor, Michigan
- Game attendance: 51,117
- Referee: Howard Wirtz

On November 16, 1968, Michigan defeated Wisconsin by a 34 to 9 score before a crowd of 51,117 at Michigan Stadium. The game was the 30th meeting between the programs. Michigan had won the prior three games from 1965 to 1967.

Ron Johnson set a modern Big Ten Conference record with 347 rushing yards on 31 carries. Johnson also scored all five touchdowns for Michigan on runs of 35, 67, 1, 60, and 49 yards. Tim Killian kicked four points after touchdown. Tom Curtis also set a Big Ten record with his tenth interception of the game. Michigan gained 364 rushing yards and 117 passing yards. Wisconsin gained 136 rushing yards and 53 passing yards.

Michigan's starting lineup against Wisconsin was Jim Mandich (left end), Bob Penska (left tackle), Dick Caldarazzo (left guard), Dave Denzin (center), Stan Broadnax (right guard), Dan Dierdorf (right tackle), Bill Harris (right end), Dennis Brown (quarterback), John Gabler (left halfback), Johnson (right halfback), and Garvie Craw (fullback).

=== Week 10: at Ohio State ===
Week 10: Michigan at Ohio State

| Team | 1 | 2 | 3 | 4 | Total |
|---|---|---|---|---|---|
| Michigan | 7 | 7 | 0 | 0 | 14 |
| • Ohio State | 7 | 14 | 6 | 23 | 50 |

- Date: November 23, 1968
- Location: Ohio Stadium
  Columbus, Ohio
- Game attendance: 85,371 [new stadium record]
- Referee: Jerry Markbreit

On November 23, 1968, Michigan suffered its second loss of the season, falling to an undefeated Ohio State team. The Buckeyes won a 50 to 14 score at Ohio Stadium. The game was the 65th meeting in the Michigan–Ohio State football rivalry. Michigan lost the 1967 game by a 20-14 score. The Wolverines came into the 1968 game ranked #4 in the AP poll, and the Buckeyes ranked #2.

Ron Johnson gained 91 rushing yards and scored both touchdowns for Michigan, and Tim Killian kicked both points after touchdown. Jim Mandich also caught seven passes for 78 yards for Michigan. Led by Jim Otis, Ohio State gained 421 rushing yards in the game. Otis accounted for 143 yards and scored four touchdowns, while Rex Kern tallied 96 rushing yards and 41 passing yards.

Michigan's starting lineup against Ohio State was Jim Mandich (left end), Bob Penska (left tackle), Dick Coldarazzo (left guard), Dave Denzin (center), Stan Broadnax (right guard), Dan Dierdorf (right tackle), Jerry Imsland (right end), Dennis Brown (quarterback), John Gabler (left halfback), Johnson (right halfback), and Garvie Craw (fullback).

=== Post-season ===
In early January 1969, the Associated Press released its final post-season college football poll for the 1968 season. The 1968 Ohio State Buckeyes football team was ranked #1 in the poll. Michigan was ranked #12.

After setting Michigan's career, season and single-game rushing records, Ron Johnson received numerous honors at the end of the 1968 season, including the following:

- He was selected by the Football Writers Association of America and Football News as a first-team running back on the 1968 College Football All-America Team.
- He was unanimously selected by his Michigan teammates as the team's most valuable player, winning the honor for the second consecutive year.
- He won the Chicago Tribune Silver Football trophy as the most valuable player in the Big Ten Conference.
- He received the Big Ten Medal as the most outstanding scholar-athlete at the University of Michigan.
- He finished sixth in the voting for the 1968 Heisman Trophy with 12 first-place votes and 158 total points.

While Johnson was the only Michigan player to receive first-team All-American honors, ten Michigan players received All-Big Ten Conference honors from either the Associated Press (AP) or United Press International (UPI). The Michigan honorees were: quarterback Dennis Brown (AP-1, UPI-1); running back Ron Johnson (AP-1, UPI-1); end Jim Mandich (AP-1, UPI-1); end Phil Seymour (AP-1, UPI-1); defensive back Tom Curtis (AP-1, UPI-1); defensive tackle Tom Goss (AP-1); linebacker Tom Stincic (UPI-1); defensive tackle Henry Hill (AP-2); offensive tackle Dan Dierdorf (AP-2); and offensive guard Stan Broadnax (AP-2).

On December 24, 1968, the University of Michigan announced that head coach Bump Elliott had been offered a newly created position as associate athletic director. The Detroit News reported that Elliott had resigned as head football coach. Two days later, on December 26, 1968, Bo Schembechler was hired to replace Elliott as Michigan's head coach.

== Players ==
=== Roster ===
1968 Michigan Wolverines football team roster
Players
Coaches
**Offense**

| Pos. | # | Name | Class |
|---|---|---|---|
| G | 60 | Robert Baumgartner | So |
| RB | 23 | Jim Betts | So |
| G | 61 | Stanley Broadnax | Sr |
| QB | 22 | Dennis Brown | Sr |
| G | 56 | Richard Caldarazzo | Jr |
| FB | 48 | Garvie Craw | Jr |
| C | 52 | David Denzin | Sr |
| OT | 72 | Dan Dierdorf | So |
| OT | 50 | Peter Drehmann | Jr |
| HB | 42 | David Farabee | Sr |
| FB | 37 | Eric Federico | Jr |
| HB | 18 | John Gabler | Jr |
| OT | 75 | Werner Hall | Jr |
| E | 81 | Mike Hankwitz | Jr |
| OT | 71 | Jack Harpring | So |
| E | 80 | William Harris | Jr |
| E | 86 | Jerry Imsland | Jr |
| RB | 40 | Ron Johnson | Sr |
| HB | 21 | Robert Kieta | Sr |
| G | 68 | Joseph Kunsa | Sr |
| TE | 88 | Jim Mandich | Jr |
| QB | 27 | Don Moorhead | So |
| OT | 76 | Bob Penska | Sr |
| C | 51 | Fred Sample | So |
| HB | 45 | Lance Scheffler | So |
| FB | 33 | Warren Sipp | Sr |
| WR | 30 | Paul Staroba | So |
| QB | 20 | John Thomas | Sr |
| G | 64 | Frank Titas | Jr |
| G | 36 | Martin Washington | Jr |

**Defense**

| Pos. | # | Name | Class |
|---|---|---|---|
| DT | 95 | James Banar | Jr |
| DB | 25 | Tom Curtis | Jr |
| LB | 16 | Thomas Doane | Jr |
| DE | 31 | Alan Francis | Jr |
| DT | 54 | Terry Frysinger | Sr |
| DT | 65 | Tom Goss | Sr |
| S | 26 | Jerry Hartman | Sr |
| DB | 24 | Brian Healy | Jr |
| MG | 39 | Henry Hill | So |
| DB | 12 | George Hoey | Sr |
| LB | 70 | Marty Huff | So |
| LB | 35 | Timothy Killian | So |
| DE | 84 | Jon Kramer | Sr |
| DB | | John Lynch | Fr |
| DT | 78 | Richard McCoy Jr. | So |
| DE | 94 | Gerald Miklos | Sr |
| LB | 97 | Ed Moore | So |
| DE | 82 | Pete Newell | So |
| DT | 74 | Daniel Parks | So |
| DB | 29 | Barry Pierson | Jr |
| LB | 55 | Cecil Pryor | Jr |
| DB | 46 | Elijah Sansom | Sr |
| DE | 91 | Phil Seymour | Jr |
| LB | 32 | Dennis Sirosky | Sr |
| DE | 90 | Tom Stincic | Sr |
| DB | 38 | Robert Wedge | Sr |
| DB | 49 | Mark Werner | Jr |
| DE | 92 | James Wilhite | Jr |
| DE | 96 | Edwin Woolley | Jr |

**Special teams**

| Pos. | # | Name | Class |

Head coach

- Bump Elliott

Coordinators/assistant coaches

Legend

- **(C)** Team captain
- **(S)** Suspended
- **(I)** Ineligible
- Injured
- Redshirt

=== Offensive letter winners ===
The following players won varsity letters for their participation on the 1968 Michigan football team. Players who started at least half of Michigan's games are shown in bold.

- Robert Baumgartner, offensive guard, sophomore, Hamilton, Ohio
- Jim Betts, sophomore, Cleveland, Ohio - started 1 game at right halfback
- **Stanley Broadnax**, offensive guard, senior, Cincinnati, Ohio - started 8 games at right guard
- **Dennis Brown**, quarterback, senior, Lincoln Park, Michigan - started 9 games at quarterback
- **Richard Caldarazzo**, offensive guard, junior, Melrose Park, Illinois - started 9 games at left guard
- **Garvie Craw**, fullback, junior, Montclair, New Jersey - started 9 games at fullback
- **David Denzin**, center, senior, Xenia, Ohio - started 9 games at center
- **Dan Dierdorf**, offensive tackle, sophomore, Canton, Ohio - started 9 games at right tackle
- Peter Drehmann, offensive tackle, junior, Abington, Pennsylvania
- David Farabee, halfback, senior, Holland, Michigan
- Eric Federico, fullback, junior, Trenton, Michigan
- **John H. Gabler**, halfback, junior, Royal Oak, Michigan - started 7 games at halfback (5 at left halfback, 2 at right halfback)
- Werner W. Hall, offensive tackle, junior, Sandusky, Ohio
- Mike Hankwitz, end, junior, Scottville, Michigan - started 1 game at left end
- Jack Harpring, offensive tackle, sophomore, Cincinnati, Ohio
- William J. Harris, end, junior, Mt. Clemens, Michigan - started 2 games at right end
- **Jerry Imsland**, end, junior, Northville, Michigan - started 7 games at right end
- **Ron Johnson**, halfback, senior, Detroit, Michigan - started 9 games at halfback (6 at right halfback, 3 at left halfback)
- Robert Kieta, halfback, senior, Chicago, Illinois
- Joseph J. Kunsa, offensive guard, senior, West Braddock, Pennsylvania
- **Jim Mandich**, end, junior, Solon, Ohio - started 8 games at left end
- Don Moorhead, quarterback, sophomore, South Haven, Michigan
- **Bob Penska**, offensive tackle, senior, Niles, Michigan - started 9 games at left tackle
- Fred Sample, center, sophomore, Pittsburgh, Pennsylvania
- Lance G. Scheffler, halfback, sophomore, Trenton, Michigan - started 1 game at right guard
- Warren Sipp, fullback, senior, Akron, Ohio
- Paul Staroba, end, sophomore, Flint, Michigan
- John R. Thomas, quarterback, senior, Walled Lake, Michigan
- Frank Titas, offensive guard, junior, Cleveland, Ohio
- Martin Washington, offensive guard, junior, Ecorse, Michigan

=== Defensive letter winners ===
The following players won varsity letters for their participation on the 1968 Michigan football team. Players who started at least half of Michigan's games are shown in bold.

- James Banar, defensive tackle, junior, Detroit, Michigan
- **Tom Curtis**, defensive halfback, junior, Aurora, Ohio - started all 10 games at left safety (also started 1 game at left halfback on offense)
- Thomas Doane, linebacker, junior, Wauseon, Ohio
- Alan Francis, defensive guard, junior, Euclid, Ohio
- Terry Frysinger, defensive tackle, senior, Ecorse, Michigan
- **Tom Goss**, defensive tackle, senior, Knoxville, Tennessee - started all 10 games at left defensive tackle (also started 1 game at left tackle on offense)
- **Gerald "Jerry" Hartman**, defensive halfback, senior, Ann Arbor, Michigan - started 4 games at left defensive halfback and 2 games at right safety
- **Brian Healy**, defensive halfback, junior, Sandusky, Ohio - started 6 games at left defensive halfback (also started 1 game at quarterback on offense)
- **Henry Hill**, defensive guard, sophomore, Detroit, Michigan - started 7 games at middle guard
- **George Hoey**, defensive halfback, senior, Flint, Michigan - started all 10 games at right defensive halfback (also started 1 game at fullback and 1 game at left halfback on offense)
- Marty Huff, linebacker, sophomore, Toledo, Ohio
- Timothy Killian, linebacker, sophomore, Lincoln Park, Michigan
- Jon E. Kramer, defensive end, senior, Toledo, Ohio - started 1 game at right defensive end
- John Lynch, defensive back, freshman, Chicago, Illinois
- Richard McCoy, Jr., defensive tackle, sophomore, Alliance, Ohio
- Gerald Miklos, defensive guard, senior, Chicago, Illinois - started 3 games at middle guard (also started 1 game at center on offense)
- **Edward M. "Ed" Moore**, linebacker, sophomore, Youngstown, Ohio - started all 10 games at linebacker (also started 1 game at right guard on offense)
- Pete Newell, defensive end, sophomore, Park Ridge, Illinois
- **Daniel Parks**, defensive tackle, sophomore, Birmingham, Michigan - started all 10 games at right defensive tackle (also started 1 game at right tackle on offense)
- Barry Pierson, defensive halfback, junior, St. Ignace, Michigan
- **Cecil Pryor**, linebacker, junior, Corpus Christi, Texas - started 8 games at right defensive end (also started 1 game at right end on offense)
- Elijah Sansom, defensive halfback, senior, Detroit, Michigan
- **Phil Seymour**, defensive end, junior, Berkley, Michigan - started all 10 games at left defensive end (also started 1 game at left end on offense)
- Dennis Sirosky, linebacker, senior, Ecorse, Michigan
- **Tom Stincic**, defensive end, senior, Cleveland, Ohio - started all 10 games at linebacker (also started 1 game at left guard on offense)
- Robert Wedge, defensive halfback, senior, Port Huron, Michigan - started 8 games at right safety (also started 1 game at right halfback on offense)
- Mark Werner, defensive halfback, junior, Cincinnati, Ohio
- James Wilhite, defensive guard, junior, Bay City, Michigan - started 1 game at right defensive end
- Edwin Woolley, defensive end, junior, Pitman, New Jersey

=== Awards and honors ===
- Captain: Ron Johnson
- All-Americans: Ron Johnson
- All-Big Ten: Ron Johnson, Tom Stincic, Jim Mandich, Dennis Brown, Phil Seymour, Tom Goss, Tom Curtis
- Most Valuable Player: Ron Johnson
- Meyer Morton Award: Bob Baumgartner
- John Maulbetsch Award: Marty Huff
- Frederick Matthei Award: Tom Curtis
- Arthur Robinson Scholarship Award: John Denzin

=== Statistical leaders ===
==== Scoring ====
| Player | Touchdowns | Extra points | Field goals | 2-pt. conv. | Points |
|---|---|---|---|---|---|
| Ron Johnson | 19 | 0 | 0 | 1 | 116 |
| Tim Killian | 0 | 21 | 5 | 0 | 36 |

==== Rushing ====
Michigan's rushing leaders in 1968, as reflected in the University of Michigan Statistics Archive, are as follows.

| Player | Attempts | Net yards | Yards per attempt | Touchdowns | Long |
|---|---|---|---|---|---|
| Ron Johnson | 255 | 1391 | 5.5 | 19 | 53 |
| Garvie Craw | 81 | 307 | 3.8 | 1 | 14 |

==== Passing ====
Michigan's passing leaders in 1968, as reflected in the University of Michigan Statistics Archive, are as follows.

| Player | Attempts | Completions | Interceptions | Comp % | Yards | Yds/Comp | TD | Long |
|---|---|---|---|---|---|---|---|---|
| Dennis Brown | 229 | 109 | 10 | 47.6 | 1562 | 14.3 | 12 | 33 |
| Don Moorhead | 25 | 10 | 2 | 40.0 | 122 | 12.2 | 1 | 10 |

==== Receiving ====
Michigan's receiving leaders in 1968, as reflected in the University of Michigan Statistics Archive, are as follows.

| Player | Receptions | Yards | Yds/Recp | TD | Long |
|---|---|---|---|---|---|
| Jim Mandich | 42 | 565 | 13.4 | 3 | 12 |
| Bill Harris | 16 | 369 | 23.1 | 4 | 69 |

== Coaching staff ==
- Head coach: Bump Elliott
- Assistant coaches

- Offensive assistants: Tony Mason (offensive backfield coach and coordinator), Frank Maloney (offensive linemen), George Mans (receivers)
- Defensive assistants: Henry Fonde (defensive backfield coach and coordinator), Dennis Fitzgerald (defensive line), Robert Shaw (defensive ends and linebackers)
- Freshman coach and scout: Bill Dodd

- Trainer: Lindsy McLean
- Manager: Rik Kohn
