= 1968 Indiana Hoosiers football team =

American college football season

1968 Indiana Hoosiers football
- Conference: Big Ten Conference
- Record: 6–4 (4–3 Big Ten)
- Head coach: John Pont (4th season)
- MVPs: Harry Gonso; Al Gage
- Captains: Al Gage; Jerry Grecco; Jim Sniadecki
- Home stadium: Seventeenth Street Stadium

1968 Big Ten Conference football standings
| | Conf. | | | | | Overall |
| Team | W | | L | | T | W | | L | | T |
|---|---|---|---|---|---|---|---|---|---|---|
| No. 1 Ohio State $ | 7 | – | 0 | – | 0 | 10 | – | 0 | – | 0 |
| No. 12 Michigan | 6 | – | 1 | – | 0 | 8 | – | 2 | – | 0 |
| No. 10 Purdue | 5 | – | 2 | – | 0 | 8 | – | 2 | – | 0 |
| Minnesota | 5 | – | 2 | – | 0 | 6 | – | 4 | – | 0 |
| Indiana | 4 | – | 3 | – | 0 | 6 | – | 4 | – | 0 |
| Iowa | 4 | – | 3 | – | 0 | 5 | – | 5 | – | 0 |
| Michigan State | 2 | – | 5 | – | 0 | 5 | – | 5 | – | 0 |
| Illinois | 1 | – | 6 | – | 0 | 1 | – | 9 | – | 0 |
| Northwestern | 1 | – | 6 | – | 0 | 1 | – | 9 | – | 0 |
| Wisconsin | 0 | – | 7 | – | 0 | 0 | – | 10 | – | 0 |
$ – Conference champion; Rankings from AP Poll

The 1968 Indiana Hoosiers football team represented the Indiana Hoosiers in the 1968 Big Ten Conference football season. They participated as members of the Big Ten Conference. The Hoosiers played their home games at Seventeenth Street Stadium in Bloomington, Indiana. The team was coached by John Pont, in his fourth year as head coach of the Hoosiers.

== Schedule ==
| Date | Opponent | Rank | Site | TV | Result | Attendance | Source |
|---|---|---|---|---|---|---|---|
| September 21 | Baylor* | No. 15 | Seventeenth Street Stadium; Bloomington, IN | | W 40–36 | 44,382 | |
| September 28 | at No. 12 Kansas* | No. 13 | Memorial Stadium; Lawrence, KS | | L 20–38 | 44,000 | |
| October 5 | Illinois | | Seventeenth Street Stadium; Bloomington, IN (rivalry) | | W 28–14 | 50,996 | |
| October 12 | at Iowa | | Iowa Stadium; Iowa City, IA | ABC | W 38–34 | 54,633 | |
| October 19 | No. 18 Michigan^{†} | No. 19 | Seventeenth Street Stadium; Bloomington, IN | | L 22–27 | 51,951 | |
| October 26 | Arizona* | | Seventeenth Street Stadium; Bloomington, IN | | W 16–13 | 44,847 | |
| November 2 | at Wisconsin | | Camp Randall Stadium; Madison, WI | | W 21–20 | 51,666 | |
| November 9 | at No. 17 Michigan State | | Spartan Stadium; East Lansing, MI (rivalry) | | W 24–22 | 65,841 | |
| November 16 | Minnesota | No. 19 | Seventeenth Street Stadium; Bloomington, IN | | L 6–20 | 49,234 | |
| November 23 | at No. 12 Purdue | | Ross–Ade Stadium; West Lafayette, IN (Old Oaken Bucket) | | L 35–38 | 63,294 | |
*Non-conference game; ^{†}Homecoming; Rankings from AP Poll released prior to the game

== Roster ==
1968 Indiana Hoosiers football team roster
Players
Coaches
Offense

| Pos. | # | Name | Class |
|---|---|---|---|
| OT | 71 | John Andrews | So |
| C | 53 | Steve Applegate | Jr |
| QB | 14 | Greg Brown | So |
| WR | 40 | Jade Butcher | Jr |
| G | 63 | Don DeSalle | Jr |
| TE | 81 | Al Gage | Sr |
| QB | 16 | Harry Gonso | Jr |
| HB | 17 | John Isenbarger | Jr |
| WR | 88 | Ken Long | Sr |
| RB | 10 | Bob Pernell | So |
| QB | 18 | Mike Perry | Sr |
| OT | 79 | Rick Spickard | Sr |
| C | 55 | Bob Jones | So |
| WR | 89 | Eric Stolberg | Jr |
| RB | 15 | Rick Thompson | So |
| G | 73 | Bill Wood | So |
| QB | 13 | George Wortley | Sr |

Defense

| Pos. | # | Name | Class |
|---|---|---|---|
| LB | 45 | Mike Adams | Jr |
| S | 33 | Mike Baughman | Jr |
| DE | 80 | Tom Bilanus | Sr |
| DB | 22 | Nate Cunningham | Sr |
| DT | 60 | Jerry Grecco | Sr |
| S | 20 | Jay Mathias | Jr |
| DB | 21 | Benny Norman | Jr |
| LB | 54 | Karl Pankratz | Jr |
| LB | 46 | Dan Silas | So |
| LB | 83 | Jim Sniadecki | Sr |
| DE | 61 | Cal Snowden | Sr |
| DT | 75 | Bob White | So |
| DT | 97 | Bill Wolfe | Jr |

Special teams

| Pos. | # | Name | Class |

Head coach

- John Pont

Coordinators/assistant coaches

Legend

- (C) Team captain
- (S) Suspended
- (I) Ineligible
- Injured
- Redshirt

== 1969 NFL draftees ==
| Player | Position | Round | Pick | NFL club |
| Jim Sniadecki | Linebacker | 4 | 86 | San Francisco 49ers |
| Cal Snowden | Defensive end | 9 | 227 | St. Louis Cardinals |
| Robert Kirk | Guard | 16 | 391 | Buffalo Bills |
