= 1968 Illinois Fighting Illini football team =

American college football season

1968 Illinois Fighting Illini football
- Conference: Big Ten Conference
- Record: 1–9 (1–6 Big Ten)
- Head coach: Jim Valek (2nd season)
- Offensive coordinator: Ellis Rainsberger (2nd season)
- MVP: Rich Johnson
- Captains: Carson Brooks; Tony Pleviak
- Home stadium: Memorial Stadium

1968 Big Ten Conference football standings
	Conf.					Overall
Team	W		L		T	W		L		T
No. 1 Ohio State $	7	–	0	–	0	10	–	0	–	0
No. 12 Michigan	6	–	1	–	0	8	–	2	–	0
No. 10 Purdue	5	–	2	–	0	8	–	2	–	0
Minnesota	5	–	2	–	0	6	–	4	–	0
Indiana	4	–	3	–	0	6	–	4	–	0
Iowa	4	–	3	–	0	5	–	5	–	0
Michigan State	2	–	5	–	0	5	–	5	–	0
Illinois	1	–	6	–	0	1	–	9	–	0
Northwestern	1	–	6	–	0	1	–	9	–	0
Wisconsin	0	–	7	–	0	0	–	10	–	0
$ – Conference champion; Rankings from AP Poll

The 1968 Illinois Fighting Illini football team was an American football team that represented the University of Illinois as a member of the Big Ten Conference during the 1968 Big Ten season. In their second year under head coach Jim Valek, the Illini compiled a 1–9 record (1–6 in conference games), finished in a tie for eighth place in the Big Ten, and were outcored by a total of 333 to 107.

The team's statistical leaders included quarterback Bob Naponic (813 passing yards, 39.0% completion percentage), fullback Rich Johnson (973 rushing yards, 4.0 yards per carry), and wide receiver Doug Dieken (21 receptions for 223 yards). Johnson was also selected as the team's most valuable player.

The team played its home games at Memorial Stadium in Champaign, Illinois.

== Schedule ==
Date	Opponent	Site	Result	Attendance	Source
September 21	Kansas*	Memorial Stadium; Champaign, IL	L 7–47	46,359	
September 28	Missouri*	Memorial Stadium; Champaign, IL (rivalry)	L 0–44	48,127	
October 5	at Indiana	Seventeenth Street Stadium; Bloomington, IN (rivalry)	L 14–28	50,996	
October 12	at Minnesota	Memorial Stadium; Minneapolis, MN	L 10–17	49,864	
October 19	at No. 6 Notre Dame*	Notre Dame Stadium; Notre Dame, IN	L 8–58	59,075	
October 26	No. 2 Ohio State	Memorial Stadium; Champaign, IL (Illibuck)	L 24–31	56,174	
November 2	at No. 6 Purdue	Ross–Ade Stadium; West Lafayette, IN (rivalry)	L 17–35	62,321	
November 9	at No. 7 Michigan	Michigan Stadium; Ann Arbor, MI (rivalry)	L 0–36	56,775	
November 16	Northwestern	Memorial Stadium; Champaign, IL (rivalry)	W 14–0	42,099	
November 23	Iowa	Memorial Stadium; Champaign, IL	L 13–37	35,055	
*Non-conference game; Rankings from AP Poll released prior to the game

== Roster ==
Team photo of the 1968 Illinois Fighting Illini.

1968 Illinois Fighting Illini football team roster
Players
Coaches
Offense

Pos.	#	Name	Class
E	82	Doug Dieken	So
QB	12	Bob Naponic	Sr

Defense

Pos.	#	Name	Class

Special teams

Pos.	#	Name	Class

Head coach

- Jim Valek

Coordinators/assistant coaches

Legend

- (C) Team captain
- (S) Suspended
- (I) Ineligible
- Injured
- Redshirt

Roster
