= 1968 Ohio State Buckeyes football team =

American college football season

1968 Ohio State Buckeyes football
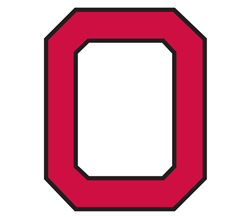

Consensus national champion Big Ten champion Rose Bowl champion

Rose Bowl, W 27–16 vs. USC
- Conference: Big Ten Conference

Ranking
- Coaches: No. 1
- AP: No. 1
- Record: 10–0 (7–0 Big Ten)
- Head coach: Woody Hayes (18th season)
- Offensive scheme: I formation
- MVP: Mark Stier
- Home stadium: Ohio Stadium

1968 Big Ten Conference football standings
	Conf.					Overall
Team	W		L		T	W		L		T
No. 1 Ohio State $	7	–	0	–	0	10	–	0	–	0
No. 12 Michigan	6	–	1	–	0	8	–	2	–	0
No. 10 Purdue	5	–	2	–	0	8	–	2	–	0
Minnesota	5	–	2	–	0	6	–	4	–	0
Indiana	4	–	3	–	0	6	–	4	–	0
Iowa	4	–	3	–	0	5	–	5	–	0
Michigan State	2	–	5	–	0	5	–	5	–	0
Illinois	1	–	6	–	0	1	–	9	–	0
Northwestern	1	–	6	–	0	1	–	9	–	0
Wisconsin	0	–	7	–	0	0	–	10	–	0
$ – Conference champion; Rankings from AP Poll

The 1968 Ohio State Buckeyes football team is an American football team that represented the Ohio State University in the 1968 Big Ten Conference football season. It is considered one of the strongest in OSU history, fielding 11 All-Americans and six first-round NFL draft picks. With quarterback Rex Kern and running back Jim Otis leading a powerful OSU offense and Jack Tatum on defense, Woody Hayes' Buckeyes capped an undefeated season with a dominating 50–14 victory over archrival Michigan and a come-from-behind 27–16 victory over defending national champion USC in the 1969 Rose Bowl to secure their first consensus national title since 1942. This was also the first year the Buckeye players were awarded Buckeye pride stickers for their helmets, each one a reward for a good play. This would be Ohio State's last outright national championship until 2002. Perhaps the biggest highlight of the year for the Buckeyes was their upset of No. 1 Purdue in their third game.

== Schedule ==
Date	Time	Opponent	Rank	Site	TV	Result	Attendance	Source
September 28	1:30 p.m.	SMU*	No. 11	Ohio Stadium; Columbus, OH		W 35–14	73,855	
October 5	1:30 p.m.	Oregon*	No. 6	Ohio Stadium; Columbus, OH		W 21–6	70,191	
October 12	1:30 p.m.	No. 1 Purdue	No. 4	Ohio Stadium; Columbus, OH		W 13–0	84,834	
October 19	2:20 p.m.	Northwestern^{†}	No. 2	Ohio Stadium; Columbus, OH	ABC	W 45–21	83,454	
October 26	2:30 p.m.	at Illinois	No. 2	Memorial Stadium; Champaign, IL (Illibuck)		W 31–24	56,174	
November 2	1:30 p.m.	No. 16 Michigan State	No. 2	Ohio Stadium; Columbus, OH		W 25–20	84,859	
November 9	2:30 p.m.	at Wisconsin	No. 2	Camp Randall Stadium; Madison, WI		W 43–8	40,972	
November 16	2:30 p.m.	at Iowa	No. 2	Iowa Stadium; Iowa City, IA		W 33–27	44,131	
November 23	1:30 p.m.	No. 4 Michigan	No. 2	Ohio Stadium; Columbus, OH (rivalry)		W 50–14	85,371	
January 1, 1969	5:00 p.m.	vs. No. 2 USC*	No. 1	Rose Bowl; Pasadena, CA (Rose Bowl)	NBC	W 27–16	102,063	
*Non-conference game; ^{†}Homecoming; Rankings from AP Poll released prior to the game; All times are in Eastern time; Source:

== Game summaries ==
=== SMU ===
SMU Mustangs at #11 Ohio State Buckeyes (0–0)

Quarter	1	2	3	4	Total
SMU	0	7	7	0	14
Ohio St	14	12	0	9	35

at Ohio Stadium • Columbus, Ohio

- Date: September 28
- Game time: 1:30 p.m. EDT
- Game weather: Clear • 65 °F (18 °C) • Wind N 5 miles per hour (8.0 km/h; 4.3 kn) to 12 miles per hour (19 km/h; 10 kn)
- Game attendance: 73,855
- TV: WOSU-TV

Game information

SMU

- Hixson
  37/69, 417 yards, 5 TD, 2 INT
- Richardson
  11 rush, 62 yards
- Levias
  15 rec, 160 yards

Ohio St

- Kern
  8/14, 139 yards, 2 TD
- Brungard
  14 rush, 101 yards, TD
- Brockington
  2 rec, 54 yards

Scoring summary

Quarter	Time	Drive			Team	Scoring information	Score	
Quarter	Time	Plays	Yards	TOP	Team	Scoring information	SMU	OSU
1	3:22	10	80		Ohio St	Kern 2-yard touchdown run, Merryman kick good	0	7
1	0:46	7	28		Ohio St	Otis 9-yard touchdown run, Merryman kick good	0	14
2	13:17				SMU	Fleming 8-yard touchdown reception from Hixson, Lesser kick good	7	14
2	12:29	3	54		Ohio St	Brungard 41-yard touchdown run, Merryman kick no good (blocked)	7	20
2	0:35	15	72		Ohio St	Brungard 18-yard touchdown reception from Kern, Merryman kick no good (miss right)	7	26
3	0:21	7	49		SMU	Fleming 6-yard touchdown reception from Hixson, Lesser kick good	14	26
4	7:55				Ohio St	Hixson tackled in end zone for a safety by Debevc	14	28
4	6:45	4	43		Ohio St	Brungard 20-yard touchdown reception from Kern, Merryman kick good	14	35
"TOP" = time of possession. For other American football terms, see Glossary of American football.							14	35

=== Oregon ===
Oregon at No. 6 Ohio State

Team	1	2	3	4	Total
Oregon	0	6	0	0	6
• No. 6 Ohio State	7	0	7	7	21

- Date: October 5, 1968
- Location:
  Ohio Stadium
  Columbus, OH
- Game start: 1:30 p.m. EDT
- Game attendance: 70,191
- Game weather: Sunny; 50 °F (10 °C); wind 9 mph NW
- Television network: WOSU-TV

Scoring summary
Q1	13:38	OSU	Pulaski 12 yard blocked punt return (Merryman kick)	OSU 7–0
Q2	:55	ORE	Schuler 14 yard pass from Harrington (kick failed)	OSU 7–6
Q3	3:19	OSU	Otis 35 yard run (Merryman kick)	OSU 14–6
Q4	13:34	OSU	Jankowski 55 yard pass from Maciejowski (Merryman kick)	OSU 21–6

Game statistics

Statistic	OSU	ORE
Total yards		
Passing yards		
Rushing yards		
Penalties		
Turnovers	0	2
Time of possession		

Game Leaders

Statistic	OSU	ORE
Passing		
Rushing		
Receiving		

=== Purdue ===
No. 1 Purdue at No. 4 Ohio State

Team	1	2	3	4	Total
No. 1 Purdue	0	0	0	0	0
• No. 4 Ohio State	0	0	13	0	13

- Date: October 12, 1968
- Location:
  Ohio Stadium
  Columbus, OH
- Game start: 1:30 p.m. EDT
- Game attendance: 84,834
- Game weather: 70 °F (21 °C); no wind
- Television network: WOSU-TV

Scoring summary
Q3	13:34	OSU	Provost 34 yard interception return (kick failed)	OSU 6–0
Q4	3:55	OSU	Long 14 yard run (Roman kick)	OSU 13–0

- Jim Otis 29 rush, 144 yards

Game statistics

Statistic	OSU	PUR
Total yards		
Passing yards		
Rushing yards		
Penalties		
Turnovers	0	2
Time of possession		

Game Leaders

Statistic	OSU	PUR
Passing		
Rushing	Jim Otis (144)	
Receiving		

=== Northwestern ===
Northwestern at No. 2 Ohio State

Team	1	2	3	4	Total
Northwestern	7	7	7	0	21
• No. 2 Ohio State	6	15	6	18	45

- Date: October 19, 1968
- Location:
  Ohio Stadium
  Columbus, OH
- Game start: 2:20 p.m. EDT
- Game attendance: 83,454
- Game weather: 65 °F (18 °C); wind 5–15 mph W
- Television network: ABC

Scoring summary
Q1	7:08	OSU	White 72 yard pass from Kern (kick failed)	OSU 6–0
Q1	2:59	NW	Harrington 14 yard pass from Shelburne (Emmerich kick)	NW 7–6
Q2	7:56	OSU	Kern 7 yard run (Long pass from Zelina)	OSU 14–7
Q2	5:49	NW	Shelburne 4 yard run (Emmerich kick)	Tie 14–14
Q2	2:50	OSU	Otis 6 yard run (Roman kick)	OSU 21–14
Q3	3:38	OSU	Jankowski 23 yard pass from Kern (kick failed)	OSU 27–14
Q3	:07	NW	Hittman 7 yard pass from Shelburne (Emmerich kick)	OSU 27–21
Q4	11:49	OSU	Otis 6 yard run (pass failed)	OSU 33–21
Q4	4:34	OSU	Hayden 3 yard run (kick failed)	OSU 39–21
Q4	2:13	OSU	Bender 37 yard pass from Maciejowski (kick failed)	OSU 45–21

- Rex Kern 20 rush, 121 yards

Game statistics

Statistic	OSU	NW
Total yards		
Passing yards		
Rushing yards		
Penalties		
Turnovers	0	2
Time of possession		

Game Leaders

Statistic	OSU	NW
Passing		
Rushing	Rex Kern (121)	
Receiving		

=== Illinois ===
No. 2 Ohio State at Illinois

Team	1	2	3	4	Total
• No. 2 Ohio State	3	21	0	7	31
Illinois	0	0	16	8	24

- Date: October 26, 1968
- Location:
  Memorial Stadium
  Champaign, IL
- Game start: 2:30 p.m. EDT
- Game attendance: 56,174
- Game weather: Clear; 55 °F (13 °C); wind 8–15 mph SW
- Television network: WOSU-TV

Scoring summary
Q1	2:21	OSU	Roman 21 yard field goal	OSU 3–0
Q2	13:55	OSU	Otis 1 yard run (Roman kick)	OSU 10–0
Q2	9:57	OSU	Kern 11 yard run (Roman kick)	OSU 17–0
Q2	2:35	OSU	Kern 16 yard run (Roman kick)	OSU 24–0
Q3	11:11	ILL	Johnson 2 yard run (Johnson run)	OSU 24–8
Q3	:21	ILL	Naponic 2 yard run (Naponic run)	OSU 24–16
Q4	4:38	ILL	Bargo 2 yard run (Bargo run)	Tie 24–24
Q4	1:30	OSU	Otis 2 yard run (Roman kick)	OSU 31–24

Game statistics

Statistic	OSU	ILL
Total yards		
Passing yards		
Rushing yards		
Penalties		
Turnovers	2	3
Time of possession		

Game Leaders

Statistic	OSU	ILL
Passing		
Rushing		
Receiving		

=== Michigan State ===
No. 16 Michigan State at No. 2 Ohio State

Team	1	2	3	4	Total
No. 16 Michigan State	0	7	13	0	20
• No.2 Ohio State	7	12	6	0	25

- Date: November 2, 1968
- Location:
  Ohio Stadium
  Columbus, OH
- Game start: 1:30 p.m. EST
- Game attendance: 84,859
- Game weather: 73 °F (23 °C); wind 5 mph SW
- Television network: WOSU-TV

Scoring summary
Q1	13:17	OSU	Otis 1 yard run (Roman kick)	OSU 7–0
Q2	13:36	OSU	Jankowski 8 yard pass from Kern (kick failed)	OSU 13–0
Q2	5:51	MSU	Tripplett 1 yard run (Boyce kick)	OSU 13–7
Q2	1:16	OSU	Otis 3 yard run (pass failed)	OSU 19–7
Q3	9:17	MSU	Foreman 13 yard pass from Tripplett (Boyce kick)	OSU 19–14
Q3	7:04	OSU	Maciejowski 2 yard run (pass failed)	OSU 25–14
Q3	:43	MSU	Love 1 yard run (pass failed)	OSU 25–20

Game statistics

Statistic	OSU	MSU
Total yards		
Passing yards		
Rushing yards		
Penalties		
Turnovers	2	6
Time of possession		

Game Leaders

Statistic	OSU	MSU
Passing		
Rushing		
Receiving		

=== Wisconsin ===
No. 2 Ohio State at Wisconsin

Team	1	2	3	4	Total
• No. 2 Ohio State	10	0	20	13	43
Wisconsin	0	0	0	8	8

- Date: November 9, 1968
- Location:
  Camp Randall Stadium
  Madison, WI
- Game start: 2:30 p.m. EST
- Game attendance: 40,972
- Game weather: Overcast; 34 °F (1 °C); wind 8 mph N
- Television network: WOSU-TV

Scoring summary
Q1	11:21	OSU	Roman 23 yard field goal	OSU 3–0
Q1	5:08	OSU	Zelina 8 yard pass from Maciejowski (Roman kick)	OSU 10–0
Q3	10:38	OSU	Maciejowski 5 yard run (Roman kick)	OSU 17–0
Q3	6:54	OSU	Otis 2 yard run (Roman kick)	OSU 24–0
Q3	1:53	OSU	Otis 2 yard run (kick failed)	OSU 30–0
Q4	12:26	WISC	Ryan 1 yard run (Voigt pass from Ryan)	OSU 30–8
Q4	9:56	OSU	Maciejowski 1 yard run (kick failed)	OSU 36–8
Q4	1:44	OSU	Maciejowski 10 yard run (Roman kick)	OSU 43–8

Game statistics

Statistic	OSU	WISC
Total yards		
Passing yards		
Rushing yards		
Penalties		
Turnovers	0	4
Time of possession		

Game Leaders

Statistic	OSU	WISC
Passing		
Rushing		
Receiving		

=== Iowa ===
No. 2 Ohio State at Iowa

Team	1	2	3	4	Total
• No. 2 Ohio State	6	6	14	7	33
Iowa	0	0	6	21	27

- Date: November 16, 1968
- Location:
  Kinnick Stadium
  Iowa City, IA
- Game start: 2:30 p.m. EST
- Game attendance: 44,131
- Game weather: Rain; 38 °F (3 °C); wind 12 mph E
- Television network: WOSU-TV

Scoring summary
Q1	12:13	OSU	Otis 7 yard run (kick failed)	OSU 6-0
Q2	6:42	OSU	Kern 3 yard run (pass failed)	OSU 12-0
Q3	10:40	OSU	Otis 1 yard run (Roman kick)	OSU 19-0
Q3	6:45	IOWA	Lawrence 1 yard run (kick failed)	OSU 19-6
Q3	1:19	OSU	Kern 1 yard run (Zelina kick)	OSU 26-6
Q4	8:59	IOWA	Podolak 3 yard run (Melendez kick)	OSU 26-13
Q4	7:07	OSU	Brockington 22 yard run (Roman kick)	OSU 33-13
Q4	4:02	IOWA	Manning 12 yard pass from Lawrence (Melendez kick)	OSU 33-20
Q4	:09	IOWA	Reardon 9 yard pass from Lawrence (Melendez kick)	OSU 33-27

Game statistics

Statistic	OSU	Iowa
Total yards		
Passing yards		
Rushing yards		
Penalties		
Turnovers	2	3
Time of possession		

Game Leaders

Statistic	OSU	Iowa
Passing		
Rushing		
Receiving		

=== Michigan ===
No. 4 Michigan at No. 2 Ohio State

Team	1	2	3	4	Total
No. 4 Michigan	7	7	0	0	14
• No. 2 Ohio State	7	14	6	23	50

- Date: November 23, 1968
- Location:
  Ohio Stadium
  Columbus, OH
- Game start: 1:30 p.m. EST
- Game attendance: 85,371
- Game weather: 55 °F (13 °C); wind 15 mph SW
- Referee: Jerry Markbreit
- Television network: WOSU-TV

Scoring summary
Q1	7:54	MICH	Johnson 1 yard run (Killian kick)	MICH 7-0
Q1	2:04	OSU	Otis 5 yard run (Roman kick)	Tie 7-7
Q2	14:37	OSU	Kern 5 yard run (Roman kick)	OSU 14-7
Q2	7:12	MICH	Johnson 1 yard run (Killian kick)	Tie 14-14
Q2	:36	OSU	Otis 2 yard run (Roman kick)	OSU 21-14
Q3	10:32	OSU	Zelina 6 yard run (kick failed)	OSU 27-14
Q4	12:25	OSU	Roman 32 yard field goal	OSU 30-14
Q4	10:14	OSU	Kern 3 yard run (Roman kick)	OSU 37-14
Q4	3:37	OSU	Otis 2 yard run (Roman kick)	OSU 44-14
Q4	1:23	OSU	Otis 1 yard run (pass failed)	OSU 50-14

Game statistics

Statistic	OSU	MICH
Total yards		
Passing yards		
Rushing yards		
Penalties		
Turnovers	3	4
Time of possession		

Game Leaders

Statistic	OSU	MICH
Passing		
Rushing		
Receiving		

=== Rose Bowl ===
No. 1 Ohio State vs. No. 2 USC

Team	1	2	3	4	Total
• No. 1 Ohio State	0	10	3	14	27
No. 2 USC	0	10	0	6	16

- Date: January 1, 1969
- Location:
  Rose Bowl
  Pasadena, CA
- Game start: 5:00 p.m. EST
- Game attendance: 102,063
- Game weather: Sunny; 84 °F (29 °C)
- Referee: Charles Moffett
- Television network: NBC

Scoring summary
Q2	9:40	USC	Ayala 21 yard field goal	USC 3–0
Q2	6:38	USC	Simpson 80 yard run (Ayala kick)	USC 10–0
Q2	1:45	OSU	Otis 1 yard run (Roman kick)	USC 10–7
Q2	:03	OSU	Roman 26 yard field goal	Tie 10–10
Q3	1:40	OSU	Roman 25 yard field goal	OSU 13–10
Q4	13:52	OSU	Hayden 4 yard pass from Kern (Roman kick)	OSU 20–10
Q4	10:05	OSU	Gillian 16 yard pass from Kern (Roman kick)	OSU 27–10
Q4	:45	USC	Dickerson 19 yard pass from Sogge (pass failed)	OSU 27–16

Game statistics

Statistic	OSU	USC
Total yards		
Passing yards		
Rushing yards		
Penalties		
Turnovers	0	5
Time of possession		

Game Leaders

Statistic	OSU	USC
Passing		
Rushing		
Receiving		

== Roster ==
1968 Ohio State Buckeyes football team roster
Players
Coaches
Offense

Pos.	#	Name	Class
E	85	Charles Aldrin	So
G	57	Thomas Backhus	Jr
HB	19	Ed Bender	Sr
HB	48	Jay Bombach	Sr
HB	42	John Brockington	So
HB	12	Dave Brungard	Jr
G	75	Dave Cheney	So
FB	36	Rich Cunningham	So
G	66	Brian Donovan	So
OT	70	Dave Foley (C)	Sr
HB	11	Ray Gillian	Jr
HB	44	Horatius Greene	Jr
OT	65	Randy Hart	Jr
HB	22	Leo Hayden	So
FB	34	Paul Huff	Jr
OT	72	Charles Hutchison	Jr
G	61	Alan Jack	Jr
E	82	Bruce Jankowski	So
QB	10	Rex Kern	So
E	81	Dick Kuhn	So
G	64	Ted Kurz	So
QB	24	Bill Long	Sr
QB	18	Ron Maciejowski	So
OT	73	Rufus Mayes	Sr
C	55	John Muhlbach	Sr
OT	76	Jim Opperman	So
FB	35	Jim Otis	Jr
C	58	Larry Qualls	So
C	52	Jim Roman	Sr
OT	59	Gary Roush	Sr
HB	23	Kevin Rusnak	Jr
E	87	Robert Smith	Sr
E	92	John Stowe	Sr
G	62	Phil Strickland	So
OT	71	Rich Troha	So
E	80	Jan White	So
HB	16	Larry Zelina	So

Defense

Pos.	#	Name	Class
LB	63	Doug Adams	So
CB	26	Tim Anderson	So
DE	86	Dan Aston	Jr
LB	33	Tom Bartley	Sr
LB	21	Arthur Burton	Jr
CB	47	Jim Coburn	So
DE	83	Mark Debevc	So
DT	78	John Dombos	So
DE	90	Tom Ecrement	So
S	28	Jerry Ersham	Sr
LB	39	James Gentile	Jr
LB	51	Bill Hackett	Jr
MG	67	Ralph Halloway	So
DT	77	Brad Nielsen	Jr
CB	15	Mike Polaski	Jr
CB	46	Ted Provost	Jr
S	43	Rich Quilling	Jr
LB	55	Mike Radtke	Jr
DE	89	Nick Roman	Sr
DT	74	Paul Schmidlin	Jr
S	3	Mike Sensibaugh	So
DT	50	Butch Smith	Jr
DE	91	John Sobolewski	Sr
LB	54	Mark Stier	Sr
MG	68	Jim Stillwagon	So
MG	69	Vic Stottlemyer	Sr
LB	32	Jack Tatum	So
CB	17	Bob Trapuzzano	Jr
DT	79	Bill Urbanik	Jr
CB	41	Tim Wagner	So
DE	88	Dave Whitfield	Jr
LB	56	Dirk Worden (C)	Sr

Special teams

Pos.	#	Name	Class

Head coach

- Woody Hayes

Coordinators/assistant coaches

- Earle Bruce
- George Chaump
- Glenn Ellison
- Hugh Hindman
- Lou Holtz
- Rudy Hubbard
- Bill Mallory
- Lou McCullough
- Esco Sarkkinen
- Carlin B. Carpenter (GA)

Legend

- (C) Team captain
- (S) Suspended
- (I) Ineligible
- Injured
- Redshirt

Roster
Last update: 2016-Feb-12

== Statistical leaders ==
- Scoring: Jim Otis
- Rushing: Jim Otis
- Passing: Rex Kern
- Receiving: Bruce Jankowski

== Players in the 1969 NFL draft ==
Player	Round	Pick	Position	NFL club
Rufus Mayes	1	14	Tackle	Chicago Bears
Dave Foley	1	26	Tackle	New York Jets
Steve Howell	10	239	Tight end	Cincinnati Bengals
