= 1968 Purdue Boilermakers football team =

American college football season

1968 Purdue Boilermakers football
- Conference: Big Ten Conference

Ranking
- Coaches: No. 11
- AP: No. 10
- Record: 8–2 (5–2 Big Ten)
- Head coach: Jack Mollenkopf (13th season)
- MVP: Leroy Keyes
- Captains: Chuck Kyle; Perry Williams
- Home stadium: Ross–Ade Stadium

1968 Big Ten Conference football standings
	Conf.					Overall
Team	W		L		T	W		L		T
No. 1 Ohio State $	7	–	0	–	0	10	–	0	–	0
No. 12 Michigan	6	–	1	–	0	8	–	2	–	0
No. 10 Purdue	5	–	2	–	0	8	–	2	–	0
Minnesota	5	–	2	–	0	6	–	4	–	0
Indiana	4	–	3	–	0	6	–	4	–	0
Iowa	4	–	3	–	0	5	–	5	–	0
Michigan State	2	–	5	–	0	5	–	5	–	0
Illinois	1	–	6	–	0	1	–	9	–	0
Northwestern	1	–	6	–	0	1	–	9	–	0
Wisconsin	0	–	7	–	0	0	–	10	–	0
$ – Conference champion; Rankings from AP Poll

The 1968 Purdue Boilermakers football team represented Purdue University during the 1968 Big Ten Conference football season. Led by 13th-year head coach Jack Mollenkopf, the Boilermakers compiled an overall record of 8–2 with a mark of 5–2 in conference play, tying for third place in the Big Ten. Purdue played home games at Ross–Ade Stadium in West Lafayette, Indiana.

== Schedule ==
Date	Opponent	Rank	Site	TV	Result	Attendance	Source
September 21	Virginia*	No. 1	Ross–Ade Stadium; West Lafayette, IN		W 44–6	60,384	
September 28	at No. 2 Notre Dame*	No. 1	Notre Dame Stadium; Notre Dame, IN (rivalry)	ABC	W 37–22	59,075	
October 5	at Northwestern	No. 1	Dyche Stadium; Evanston, IL		W 43–6	45,163	
October 12	at No. 4 Ohio State	No. 1	Ohio Stadium; Columbus, OH		L 0–13	84,834	
October 19	Wake Forest*	No. 5	Ross–Ade Stadium; West Lafayette, IN		W 28–27	57,694	
October 26	Iowa	No. 7	Ross–Ade Stadium; West Lafayette, IN		W 44–14	61,927	
November 2	Illinois^{†}	No. 6	Ross–Ade Stadium; West Lafayette, IN (rivalry)		W 35–17	62,321	
November 9	at Minnesota	No. 6	Memorial Stadium; Minneapolis, MN	ABC	L 13–27	49,780	
November 16	at Michigan State	No. 15	Spartan Stadium; East Lansing, MI		W 9–0	68,362	
November 23	Indiana	No. 12	Ross–Ade Stadium; West Lafayette, IN (Old Oaken Bucket)		W 38–35	63,294	
*Non-conference game; ^{†}Homecoming; Rankings from AP Poll released prior to the game; Source:

== Game summaries ==
=== Wake Forest ===
- Leroy Keyes 25 rushes, 214 yards

=== Indiana ===
- Leroy Keyes 28 rushes, 140 yards

== Roster ==
1968 Purdue Boilermakers football team roster
Players
Coaches
Offense

Pos.	#	Name	Class
RB		Stan Brown
RB		John Bullock
WR		Randy Cooper
OL		Paul DeNuccio
WR		Bob Dillingham
WR		Mike Engelbrecht
OL		Mike Frame
OT	70	Donnie Green	So
WR		Marion Griffin
RB	23	Leroy Keyes	Sr
QB		Don Kiepert
OL		Clanton King
RB		Jim Kirkpatrick
QB	15	Mike Phipps	Jr
G	61	Gary Roberts	Sr
OL		Dave Stydahar
RB		Leon Troyer
OL		Clinton Turner
OL		Walter Whitehead
RB	47	Perry Williams	Sr

Defense

Pos.	#	Name	Class
DT	81	Tom Bayless	Jr
DL		Alex Davis
DB		Steve deGrandmaison
DB		Larry Emch
DB	43	Tim Foley	Jr
DL		Chuck Kyle
DB		Richard Mahurt
DL		Ron Maree
LB		Dick Marvel
DE	88	Bill McKoy	Jr
DL		Willie Nelson
LB	99	Vero Paraskevas	So
DB		John Reilly
DB		Don Webster
DE	97	Dennis Wirgowski	Jr
DT	72	William Yancher	Jr
LB		Bob Yunaska

Special teams

Pos.	#	Name	Class
K		Jeff Jones

Head coach

- Jack Mollenkopf

Coordinators/assistant coaches

- Bob DeMoss
- Ned Maloney
- Ron Meyer
- George Catavolos (GA)

Legend

- (C) Team captain
- (S) Suspended
- (I) Ineligible
- Injured
- Redshirt
