= Cal Snowden =

American football player (born 1946)

No. 87, 75, 57, 71
- Position: Defensive end

Personal information
- Born: November 29, 1946 (age 79); Washington, D.C., U.S.
- Listed height: 6 ft 4 in (1.93 m)
- Listed weight: 253 lb (115 kg)

Career information
- High school: Roosevelt (Washington D.C.)
- College: Indiana
- NFL draft: 1969: 9th round, 227th overall pick

Career history
- St. Louis Cardinals (1969–1970); Buffalo Bills (1971); San Diego Chargers (1972–1973)

Awards and highlights
- Second-team All-Big Ten (1967)

Career NFL statistics
- Sacks: 11
- Stats at Pro Football Reference

Calvin Reginald Snowden (born November 29, 1946) is an American former professional football player who was a defensive end in National Football League (NFL). He played college football for the Indiana Hoosiers. He played five seasons in the NFL for the St. Louis Cardinals, Buffalo Bills, and San Diego Chargers.
