= Tom McCauley (American football) =

American football player (born 1947)

- McCauley in 1972

No. 20
- Positions: Defensive back, Return specialist

Personal information
- Born: May 3, 1947 (age 79); Worcester, Massachusetts, U.S.
- Listed height: 6 ft 3 in (1.91 m)
- Listed weight: 193 lb (88 kg)

Career information
- High school: Garden City (Garden City, New York)
- College: Wisconsin
- NFL draft: 1969: 10th round, 253rd overall pick

Career history
- Minnesota Vikings (1969)*; Atlanta Falcons (1969–1971)
- * Offseason or practice squad member only

Career NFL statistics
- Interceptions: 2
- Fumble recoveries: 1
- Punt return yards: 135
- Touchdowns: 1
- Stats at Pro Football Reference

Tom McCauley (born May 3, 1947) is a former defensive back in the National Football League (NFL). He was selected in the tenth round of the 1969 NFL/AFL draft by the Minnesota Vikings and would play three seasons with the Atlanta Falcons.
