= Phil Seymour (American football) =

American football player (1947–2013)

No. 91
- Position: Defensive end

Personal information
- Born: Detroit, Michigan, U.S.
- Died: June 5, 2013 (age 65)

Career information
- High school: Detroit (MI) Salesian
- College: Michigan

Awards and highlights
- 2× First-team All-Big Ten (1968, 1970)

Philip Hogan Seymour (December 17, 1947 - June 5, 2013) was an American football player. He played college football as a defensive end at the University of Michigan from 1967 to 1970 and was selected as a first-team All-Big Ten Conference player in both 1968 and 1970. He was also named an Academic All-American in 1970

== Early life ==
Seymour was born in 1947 and grew up in Berkley, Michigan, a suburb of Detroit. He attended Salesian High School in Detroit. His cousins, Paul Seymour and Jim Seymour, attended Shrine Catholic High School, and both went on to become All-American football players at Michigan and Notre Dame, respectively.

== University of Michigan ==
Seymour enrolled at the University of Michigan in 1966 and played college football as a defensive end for the Michigan Wolverines football teams under head coaches Bump Elliott and Bo Schembechler from 1967 to 1970. As a sophomore, he started all 10 games at defensive end and one game at offensive end for coach Elliott's final team—the 1968 Michigan Wolverines football team that compiled an 8-2 record and was ranked #12 in the final AP Poll. Seymour led the 1968 Michigan team with 92 tackles, including a career-high 17 tackles against California in the first game of the season. At the end of the season, Seymour was selected as a first-team defensive end on the 1968 All-Big Ten Conference football team.

Seymour missed most of the 1969 season with a knee injury, appearing only briefly in one game against Michigan State.

As a senior, Seymour started seven games at defensive end, while his cousin Paul Seymour started nine games at tight end, for the 1970 Michigan Wolverines football team that compiled a 9-1 record, allowed only 90 points on defense (9 points per game), and finished the season ranked #7 in the final UPI poll. Seymour was again selected as a first-team player on the 1970 All-Big Ten Conference football team. He also earned Academic All-America honors in 1970.

== Later life ==
Seymour later graduated from the University of Maryland Law School. He was married to Julie Ann (Pastula) Seymour for 41 years, and they had three children, Ann, Maureen, and Patrick. Seymour died in 2013 at age 65.
