= Noel Jenke =

American football player (1946–2020)

No. 52, 59, 55
- Position: Linebacker

Personal information
- Born: December 17, 1946; Owatonna, Minnesota, U.S.
- Died: July 23, 2020 (aged 73); Milwaukee, Wisconsin, U.S.
- Listed height: 6 ft 2 in (1.88 m)
- Listed weight: 221 lb (100 kg)

Career information
- High school: Owatonna
- College: Minnesota (1965-1968)
- NFL draft: 1969: 12th round, 303rd overall pick

Career history
- Minnesota Vikings (1971); Atlanta Falcons (1972); Green Bay Packers (1973–1974)

Awards and highlights
- First-team All-Big Ten (1968); Second-team All-Big Ten (1967)

Career NFL statistics
- Fumble recoveries: 2
- Stats at Pro Football Reference

Noel Charles Jenke (December 17, 1946 – July 23, 2020) was an American professional football player who was a linebacker in the National Football League (NFL). He played for three different teams during the 1971 through 1974 seasons. Before playing professional football, Jenke was a minor league baseball player in the Boston Red Sox organization.

== Amateur career ==
Jenke attended Owatonna High School in Owatonna, Minnesota, where he lettered each of his three high school years in three sports—football, basketball, and baseball—while captaining each in his senior year. He also played on a local ice hockey team that won state championships and played in national tournaments.

Jenke attended the University of Minnesota, where he again lettered in three sports: three times in football, three times in ice hockey, and one time in baseball. He served as captain of the 1968 Minnesota Golden Gophers football team, which went 6–4 (5–2 in Big Ten games). He was the first athlete in the university's history to letter in three sports, and to be drafted by professional teams in those three sports. Honors included:

- AP All Big Ten First-team in football (1968)
- All Big Ten Academic First-team in football (1968)
- AP All Big Ten First-team in baseball (1969)
- Sporting News and Topps All American Baseball Team (1969)

== Professional career ==
Jenke was selected in the draft of three professional sports leagues:

- Football: selected by the Minnesota Vikings in the 12th round of the 1969 NFL/AFL draft.
- Baseball: selected by the Boston Red Sox in the first round of the 1969 MLB draft.
- Ice hockey: (Note: Some sources state that Jenke was drafted by the NHL's Chicago Blackhawks; this is not corroborated by contemporary newspapers of the era.) selected by the Minnesota Fighting Saints of the World Hockey Association in that league's General Player Draft, held in February 1972.

=== Baseball ===
After being drafted by the Red Sox, Jenke played three seasons of professional baseball (1969–1971), appearing with the Louisville Colonels (AAA), Winston-Salem Red Sox (A), and Pawtucket Red Sox (AA). An outfielder, Jenke threw right-handed and batted left-handed. In 120 career minor league games, he had a .241 batting average with 5 home runs and 35 RBIs.

=== Football ===
After playing minor league baseball for three seasons, Jenke spent the 1971 NFL season with the Vikings, appearing in all 14 regular-season games, plus the Vikings' loss to Dallas Cowboys in the first round of the 1971–72 NFL playoffs. During the 1972 preseason, Jenke was waived by the Vikings and claimed by the Atlanta Falcons; he appeared in one regular-season game with the Falcons, then was moved to their practice squad in late September. During the 1973 preseason, Jenke was released by the Falcons and signed onto the practice squad of the Green Bay Packers. He was activated during the season and appeared in two games with the Packers. Jenke began the 1974 season on Green Bay's injured reserve list, was added to their active roster in late October, and appeared in eight games. In August 1975, the Packers released Jenke; he did not play professional football again.

== Personal life ==
Jenke married Jane Schlamel in October 1972; the couple had three sons by 1988. After his professional sports career, Jenke worked in sales for Champion sportswear.

Jenke died on July 23, 2020, at the age of 73. He had been in the hospital due to a surgery, and had had both a positive and negative test for COVID-19.
