= Rich Johnson (American football) =

American football player (born 1947)

No. 38
- Position: Running back

Personal information
- Born: May 13, 1947 (age 79); Canton, Illinois, U.S.
- Listed height: 6 ft 1 in (1.85 m)
- Listed weight: 225 lb (102 kg)

Career information
- High school: Canton
- College: Illinois (1965-1968)
- NFL draft: 1969: 3rd round, 78th overall pick

Career history
- Houston Oilers (1969); Winnipeg Blue Bombers (1970)

Awards and highlights
- Second-team All-Big Ten (1968)

Career AFL statistics
- Rushing yards: 42
- Rushing average: 3.8
- Receptions: 2
- Receiving yards: 17
- Total touchdowns: 1
- Stats at Pro Football Reference

Richard Lewis Johnson (born May 13, 1947) is an American former professional football player who was a running back for the Houston Oilers of the American Football League (AFL). He played college football for the Illinois Fighting Illini and was selected by the Oilers in the third round of the 1969 NFL/AFL draft.

== College career ==
At the University of Illinois Urbana-Champaign, Johnson was a member of the Fighting Illini for four seasons, playing his final three years and starting the last two at fullback. He rushed for 768 yards and six touchdowns on 195 carries in his junior season. As a senior, Johnson finished 20th in the nation with 973 rushing yards and was named second team All-Big Ten Conference and the team Most Valuable Player. He finished his collegiate career with 2,058 rushing yards, fourth-most in school history at the time, and 11 touchdowns.

== Professional career ==
Johnson was selected in the third round (78th overall) of the 1969 NFL/AFL draft by the Houston Oilers. He played in all of the Oilers games during the 1969 season, rushing 11 times for 42 yards with two receptions for 17 yards and one touchdown in his lone professional season.
