= Al Brenner =

American football player (1947–2012)

No. 48
- Position: Defensive back

Personal information
- Born: November 13, 1947; Benton Harbor, Michigan, U.S.
- Died: February 13, 2012 (aged 64); Clinton, North Carolina, U.S.
- Listed height: 6 ft 1 in (1.85 m)
- Listed weight: 200 lb (91 kg)

Career information
- High school: Niles (Niles, Michigan)
- College: Michigan State
- NFL draft: 1969: 7th round, 170th overall pick

Career history
- New York Giants (1969–1970); Hamilton Tiger-Cats (1971–1974); Winnipeg Blue Bombers (1975); Ottawa Rough Riders (1975-1977)

Awards and highlights
- 2× Grey Cup champion (1972, 1976); CFL All-Star (1972); 2× CFL East All-Star (1972, 1974); First-team All-American (1968); First-team All-Big Ten (1968)

Career NFL statistics
- Return yards: 50
- Stats at Pro Football Reference

Allen Ray Brenner (November 13, 1947 – February 13, 2012) was an American professional football player who was a defensive back in the National Football League (NFL) and Canadian Football League (CFL). He played college football for the Michigan State Spartans. He played in the CFL for seven years.

== Football career ==
Brenner played defensive back for the Hamilton Tiger-Cats, Winnipeg Blue Bombers and Ottawa Rough Riders from 1971 to 1977. He was a CFL All-Star in 1972, the same year he set a record of most interceptions in a season at 15, and also won the Grey Cup with the Tiger-Cats. He was also part of the Ottawa Rough Riders when they won the Grey Cup in 1976. Brenner started his career with the New York Giants of the NFL, for whom he played two seasons. He played college football at Michigan State University where he was an All-American in 1968. was also the head coach of the Burlington Braves of the Canadian Junior Football League in 1981.

While playing in the CFL for the Hamilton Tiger-Cats he intercepted Joe Theismann four times in one game. Brenner also was part of "The Game of the Century", where both Michigan State and Notre Dame were ranked number one in the country and went to a 10–10 tie in 1966.

== Disappearance ==
Brenner was reported missing in April 1983. He, his wife, and four children were residents of Burlington, Ontario. Brenner is featured in a Fifth Estate program on December 3, 2010 which discusses his disappearance and subsequent resurfacing eight years after abandoning his family. He is interviewed living in an unnamed small town in North Carolina and says he cannot explain why he left.

== Death ==
Brenner died on February 13, 2012, at age 64, in Clinton, North Carolina, after a long illness.

== See also ==
- List of solved missing person cases (1980s)
