= Tom Goss (American football) =

American football player and administrator (born 1946)

Biographical details
- Born: July 6, 1946 (age 80); Knoxville, Tennessee, U.S.

Playing career
- 1965–1968: Michigan
- Position: Defensive tackle

Administrative career (AD unless noted)
- 1997–2000: Michigan

Accomplishments and honors

Awards
- First-team All-Big Ten (1968)

Thomas A. Goss (born July 6, 1946) is an American former football player and college athletics administrator. He served as the athletic director at the University of Michigan from 1997 to 2000.

Goss was born in Knoxville, Tennessee, in 1946. He attended Austin High School in Knoxville. In 1964, he enrolled at the University of Michigan. Goss was initiated into Kappa Alpha Psi fraternity - Sigma chapter in 1966. He played for the Michigan Wolverines football team as a defensive lineman from 1965 to 1968. He was selected as a first-team All-Big Ten Conference defensive tackle in 1968. He received a Bachelor of Science degree in physical education in 1968.

From 1969 to 1997, Goss was employed in business with various companies, including Procter & Gamble, R. J. Reynolds Industries, Del Monte Foods, Faygo, National Beverage, and PIA Merchandising.

In September 1997, Goss became the athletic director at the University of Michigan. Goss took over as athletic director amid the University of Michigan basketball scandal. One month after taking over as athletic director, Goss fired the school's head basketball coach, Steve Fisher, for his involvement in violations relating to the scandal. Michigan's athletic department ran a deficit in 1999, and Goss came under criticism for his management of the department. In February 2000, Goss announced his resignation.
