= Dick Enderle =

American football player (1947–2008)

No. 63, 62, 67
- Position: Guard

Personal information
- Born: November 6, 1947; Breckenridge, Minnesota, U.S.
- Died: September 4, 2008 (aged 60); New York City, New York, U.S.
- Listed height: 6 ft 2 in (1.88 m)
- Listed weight: 250 lb (113 kg)

Career information
- High school: Elbow Lake (MN)
- College: Minnesota
- NFL draft: 1969: 7th round, 148th overall pick

Career history
- Atlanta Falcons (1969–1971); New York Giants (1972–1975); San Francisco 49ers (1976); Green Bay Packers (1976)

Awards and highlights
- First-team All-Big Ten (1968)

Career NFL statistics
- Games played: 96
- Stats at Pro Football Reference

Richard Allyn Enderle (November 6, 1947 – September 4, 2008) was an American professional football guard who played eight seasons in the National Football League (NFL). He attended the University of Minnesota. Enderle was found dead at his home in Manhattan, New York on September 4, 2008.
