= Larry Lawrence (gridiron football) =

American gridiron football player (born 1949)

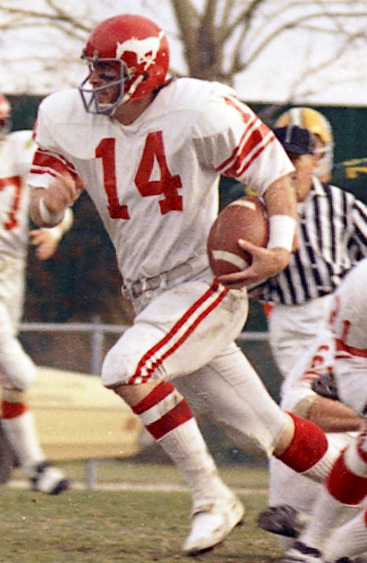
- Lawrence with the Calgary Stampeders in 1970

No. 13
- Position: Quarterback

Personal information
- Born: April 11, 1949; Mount Pleasant, Iowa, U.S.
- Died: December 4, 2012 (aged 63); Galveston, Texas, U.S.

Career information
- College: Miami (FL); Iowa
- NFL draft: 1970: undrafted

Career history
- Calgary Stampeders (1970); Edmonton Eskimos (1971); Oakland Raiders (1974–1975); Tampa Bay Buccaneers (1976); Montreal Alouettes (1978)

Career NFL statistics
- Passing attempts: 31
- Passing completions: 9
- Completion percentage: 29.0%
- TD–INT: 0–4
- Passing yards: 79
- Passer rating: 0
- Stats at Pro Football Reference

Larry Robert Lawrence (April 11, 1949 – December 4, 2012) was an American professional football player who was a quarterback in the National Football League (NFL) and Canadian Football League (CFL). Lawrence attended Thomas Jefferson High School in Cedar Rapids, Iowa and played college football for the Miami Hurricanes and Iowa Hawkeyes. Undrafted coming out of college, he started his pro career in the CFL for two seasons, then signed with the Oakland Raiders as a free agent. He played for two years as a backup, starting two games and missing most of the 1975 season with an injury. The Buccaneers traded for him during the 1976 preseason. Coach John McKay praised his accuracy in the preseason, but he was unable to make an impact in limited playing time during the regular season, and was waived when Pittsburgh Steelers backup quarterback Terry Hanratty became available. Lawrence died on December 4, 2012.
