= Ken Criter =

American football player (born 1947)

No. 12, 78, 53
- Position: Linebacker

Personal information
- Born: February 17, 1947 (age 79); Fond du Lac, Wisconsin, U.S.
- Listed height: 6 ft 0 in (1.83 m)
- Listed weight: 225 lb (102 kg)

Career information
- High school: New Holstein (New Holstein, Wisconsin)
- College: Wisconsin (1965-1968)
- NFL draft: 1969: undrafted

Career history
- Denver Broncos (1969-1974)

Awards and highlights
- Third-team All-American (1968); 2× First-team All-Big Ten (1967, 1968)

Career NFL/AFL statistics
- Fumble recoveries: 3
- Safeties: 1
- Stats at Pro Football Reference

Ken Criter (born February 17, 1947) is an American former professional football player who was a linebacker for the Denver Broncos of the American Football League (AFL) and National Football League (NFL). Criter graduated from New Holstein High School in New Holstein, Wisconsin. He went on to attend the University of Wisconsin–Madison, where he played college football for the Wisconsin Badgers. A linebacker at Wisconsin, Criter became a first-Team All-Big Ten selection in 1967 and 1968.

Criter went on to the AFL where he played for the Denver Broncos in 1969. The Broncos joined the NFL in 1970 and Criter played for them until 1974. During his first two of seasons Criter wore the jersey number 78, but later switched to jersey number 53. He played in 75 games for the Broncos, and served as a linebacker, special teams player, kick returner, and punt returner. During his pro career Criter returned one punt and thirteen kickoffs. During the 1973 season he recorded a safety. The Broncos' special teams unit was referred to as Criter's Critters and Criter was considered an "animal" on the coverage team.

Criter was born to Irmin and Elvira Criter.

== See also ==
- List of American Football League players
