= Ron Johnson (running back) =

American football player (1947–2018)

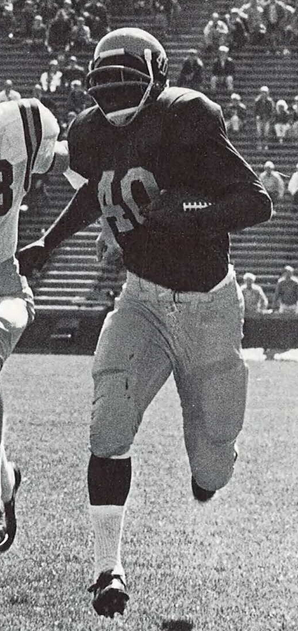
- Johnson in 1967

No. 30
- Position: Running back

Personal information
- Born: October 17, 1947; Detroit, Michigan, U.S.
- Died: November 10, 2018 (aged 71); Madison, New Jersey, U.S.
- Listed height: 6 ft 1 in (1.85 m)
- Listed weight: 205 lb (93 kg)

Career information
- High school: Northwestern (Detroit)
- College: Michigan
- NFL draft: 1969: 1st round, 20th overall pick

Career history
- Cleveland Browns (1969); New York Giants (1970–1975)

Awards and highlights
- First-team All-Pro (1970); Second-team All-Pro (1972; 2× Pro Bowl (1970, 1972); 72nd greatest New York Giant of all-time; First-team All-American (1968); Second-team All-American (1967); Chicago Tribune Silver Football (1968); First-team All-Big Ten (1967)

Career NFL statistics
- Rushing yards: 4,308
- Rushing average: 3.6
- Receptions: 213
- Receiving yards: 1,977
- Total touchdowns: 55
- Stats at Pro Football Reference
- College Football Hall of Fame

Ronald Adolphis Johnson (October 17, 1947 – November 10, 2018) was an American professional football player who was a running back in the National Football League (NFL).

Johnson played college football at the halfback position for the University of Michigan from 1966 to 1968. He set a Michigan school record in 1967 by rushing for 270 yards in a game. In 1968, he became the first African-American to serve as the captain of a Michigan football team. He set an NCAA record by rushing for 347 yards in a game and set Big Ten Conference records with 92 points scored and 1,017 rushing yards in seven conference games. He also set Michigan records with 2,524 career rushing yards, 19 rushing touchdowns in a season, and 139.1 rushing yards per game in 1968.

He played seven seasons in the NFL from 1969 to 1975 and became the first player in New York Giants history to rush for 1,000 yards in a season, accomplishing the feat in both 1970 and 1972. He also led the NFL in rushing attempts in both 1970 and 1972. Johnson retired as a player in 1976, was inducted into the College Football Hall of Fame in 1992, and became chairman of the National Football Foundation in 2006. He was diagnosed with Alzheimer's disease in 2008, and died in 2018. He is the brother of 1970 American League batting champion Alex Johnson.

== Early years and family ==
Johnson was born in Detroit, Michigan, in 1947. His father, Arthur Johnson, having a fourth-grade education, supported his wife and his five children with his own trucking company, Johnson Trucking. Ron's older brother, Alex Johnson, was a star baseball and football player at Northwestern High School, and opted to play baseball and made his Major League Baseball debut in July 1964 when Ron was 16 years old. Ron followed Alex to Northwestern High School, becoming a star baseball and football player and graduating in 1965.

== University of Michigan ==
Johnson enrolled at the University of Michigan in the fall of 1965 and played college football for the Michigan Wolverines football team from 1966 to 1968 under head coach Bump Elliott. As a sophomore in 1966, Johnson gained 44 yards on 12 carries, seeing limited playing time in a backfield that included seniors Carl Ward and Jim Detwiler.

=== 1967 season ===
As a junior in 1967, Johnson became the Wolverines' starting halfback, gaining 982 rushing yards on 210 carries for an average of 4.7 yards per carry. On October 7, 1967, in his third game as a starter, Johnson eclipsed the Michigan and Big Ten Conference single-game rushing records with 270 rushing yards on 26 carries, for an average of 10.4 yards per carry, against Navy. He also had 100-yard games that same year against Michigan State (107 yards on 24 carries), Minnesota (108 yards on 17 carries), and 167 yards against Northwestern (167 yards on a career-high 42 carries). He set a Big Ten record with his 42 carries against Northwestern, and he was selected as the most valuable player on the 1967 Michigan Wolverines football team.

=== 1968 season ===
As a senior, Johnson was captain of the 1968 Michigan Wolverines football team, the first African-American player to receive that honor at Michigan. Johnson led the 1968 team, originally predicted to be an "also-ran" in the Big Ten, to an 8–2 record and a No. 12 ranking in the final AP poll. He rushed for 1,391 yards on 255 carries in 10 games during the 1968 season. In the second game of the 1968 season, Johnson tallied his second 200-yard game, rushing for 189 yards in the first half alone, and finishing with 205 yards on 31 carries against Duke. He followed with three consecutive 100-yard games against Navy (121 yards on 22 carries) Michigan State (152 yards on 19 carries), and Indiana (163 yards on 34 carries).

On November 16, 1968, in his next-to-last game for Michigan, Johnson set an NCAA record by rushing for 347 yards on 31 carries (11.2 yards per carry) against Wisconsin. He also scored a Big Ten record five rushing touchdowns in Michigan's 34–9 victory over the Badgers. The Chicago Tribune hailed Johnson's performance against Wisconsin as "the most explosive display of running in the proud history of the Big Ten conference." As of 2014, his 347 rushing yards remains a Michigan single-game rushing record.

Johnson also set several career and season records at Michigan. His 2,524 rushing yards set a new career rushing record at Michigan, eclipsing the record set by Tom Harmon from 1938 to 1940. He also set Big Ten single-season records with 92 points scored and 1,017 rushing yards in seven conference games during the 1968 season. During the 1968 season, Johnson also set Michigan single-season records with 19 rushing touchdowns (breaking a record set by Tom Harmon in 1940), 139.1 rushing yards per game, and 1,557 combined rushing/receiving yards.

Michigan head coach Bump Elliott credited Johnson's success to his instincts: "I just think it's instinct. He's a strong runner and has great instincts." Ohio State University assistant coach Esco Sarkkinen credited Johnson's physique: "Johnson has good size, speed, agility and balance. But his extraordinary physique give him the ability to shake off tacklers." Johnson himself credited his ability to find an opening as his main asset: "Picking the hole is what I think I do best. It's more instinct than anything else. You either have it or you don't. When the play is called in the huddle I start thinking about where the hole is supposed to be."

At the end of his senior year, Johnson won numerous honours, including the following:

- He was selected by the Football Writers Association of America and Football News as a first-team running back on the 1968 College Football All-America Team. He was also selected as a second-team All-American by the AP, UPI, and NEA.
- He was unanimously selected by his Michigan teammates as the team's most valuable player, winning the honor for the second consecutive year.
- He won the Chicago Tribune Silver Football trophy as the most valuable player in the Big Ten Conference.
- He received the Big Ten Medal as the most outstanding scholar-athlete at the University of Michigan.
- He finished sixth in the voting for the 1968 Heisman Trophy with 12 first-place votes and 158 total points.

Johnson graduated from the University of Michigan in 1969 with a business degree.

== Professional football ==
Johnson was selected 20th overall by the Cleveland Browns in the first round of the 1969 NFL/AFL Draft. In August 1969, Johnson ended a lengthy holdout, signing a two-year contract with the Browns in exchange for a compensation package reported to be in excess of $100,000. In a disappointing rookie season, he appeared in all 14 games, 13 as a starter, as a fullback for the Browns, but gained only 472 yards and scored seven touchdowns on 138 carries.

Johnson, along with Jim Kanicki and Wayne Meylan, was traded by the Browns to the New York Giants for Homer Jones on January 26, 1970. He noted at the time that he was "shocked" by the trade, but hopeful since he believed he was better suited to being a halfback than a fullback as he was used in Cleveland.

In his first season in New York, Johnson became the first player in Giants franchise history to rush for 1,000 yards. On November 8, 1970, he rushed for 136 yards and caught four passes for 59 yards, including a game-winning touchdown pass with three minutes remaining, in a 23–20 victory over the Dallas Cowboys. He led the NFL with 263 carries and gained 1,027 yards, second in the NFL behind Larry Brown. He also gained 487 receiving yards on 48 catches. Late in the 1970 season, Giants quarterback Fran Tarkenton said of Johnson: "Johnson is the best halfback in football today ... period! He's just a devastating football player." Johnson's 1,000-yard season capped a big year for the Johnson family, as brother Alex won the American League batting title with a .329 average for the California Angels.

In the summer of 1971, Johnson suffered a thigh injury while playing a pickup basketball game in Ann Arbor, Michigan. After blood collected in his thigh tissue, Johnson was required to undergo surgery. As a result of the injury, Johnson missed the first six games of the 1971 NFL season. He returned to the lineup for two games, but he sustained a ligament injury against the San Diego Chargers on November 7, 1971, and missed the remainder of the season. Johnson gained 156 yards on 32 carries in two games during the 1971 season.

Johnson returned to his pre-injury form during the 1972 NFL season. He led the NFL with a career-high 298 carries and gained 1,182 rushing yards, third best in the NFL behind O. J. Simpson and Larry Brown. He also gained 451 receiving yards on 45 catches. Johnson's two 1-000-yard seasons were also the only two winning seasons the Giants had between 1964 and 1980.

Johnson continued to play for the Giants through the 1975 season. He tallied 902 rushing yards and 377 receiving yards in 1973, but saw his playing time drop off in 1974 and 1975. In 1974 he was held back by two leg injuries, a thumb injury, and possibly with issues with new head coach Bill Arnsparger relating to Johnson's role in the 1974 NFL strike. Johnson played out his option in 1975 and signed a contract to play for the Dallas Cowboys in June 1976, but he was cut by Dallas before the 1976 season began.

== NFL career statistics ==
Legend
	Led the league
**Bold**	Career high

Year	Team	Games		Rushing					Receiving				
Year	Team	GP	GS	Att	Yds	Avg	Lng	TD	Rec	Yds	Avg	Lng	TD
1969	CLE	14	13	138	472	3.4	48	7	24	164	6.8	18	0
1970	NYG	14	14	263	1,027	3.9	**68**	8	**48**	**487**	10.1	**50**	4
1971	NYG	2	2	32	156	**4.9**	17	1	6	47	7.8	30	0
1972	NYG	14	14	**298**	**1,182**	4.0	35	**9**	45	451	10.0	39	**5**
1973	NYG	12	11	260	902	3.5	29	6	32	377	**11.8**	45	3
1974	NYG	11	6	97	218	2.2	14	4	24	171	7.1	21	2
1975	NYG	14	8	116	351	3.0	23	5	34	280	8.2	36	1
		81	68	1,204	4,308	3.6	68	40	213	1,977	9.3	50	15

== Family and later years ==
In 1970, Johnson married his wife, Karen, and they have two children, Christopher and Allison. In approximately 1983, Johnson started Rackson, a food service company based in Totowa, New Jersey. His son, Christopher, later joined the company, which eventually owned 13 Kentucky Fried Chicken franchises in Michigan and New Jersey.

Johnson was inducted into the College Football Hall of Fame in 1992. In 2006, he was named the chairman of the National Football Foundation, operator of the College Football Hall of Fame, becoming its fifth chairman in 59 years. In 2008, Johnson was diagnosed with Alzheimer's disease. As of 2011, Johnson was living in a residential care facility in New Jersey, and the majority of the cost of his care was being funded by the NFL's "88 Plan".

== Death ==
Johnson died on November 10, 2018, at the age of 71, in Madison, New Jersey.

== See also ==
- University of Michigan Athletic Hall of Honor
- Lists of Michigan Wolverines football rushing leaders
