= 1968 Boston College Eagles football team =

American college football season

1968 Boston College Eagles football
- Conference: Independent
- Record: 6–3
- Head coach: Joe Yukica (1st season)
- Captain: Gary Andrachik
- Home stadium: Alumni Stadium

1968 NCAA University Division independents football records
	Conf.			Overall
Team	W	L	T	W		L		T
No. 2 Penn State		–		11	–	0	–	0
Rutgers		–		8	–	2	–	0
West Texas State		–		8	–	2	–	0
No. 5 Notre Dame		–		7	–	2	–	1
Florida State		–		8	–	3	–	0
Air Force		–		7	–	3	–	0
Army		–		7	–	3	–	0
Buffalo		–		7	–	3	–	0
No. 18 Houston		–		6	–	2	–	2
Utah State		–		7	–	3	–	0
Boston College		–		7	–	3	–	0
West Virginia		–		7	–	3	–	0
Virginia Tech		–		7	–	4	–	0
Syracuse		–		6	–	4	–	0
Villanova		–		6	–	4	–	0
Xavier		–		6	–	4	–	0
Colgate		–		5	–	5	–	0
Dayton		–		5	–	5	–	0
Miami (FL)		–		5	–	5	–	0
New Mexico State		–		5	–	5	–	0
Georgia Tech		–		4	–	6	–	0
Southern Miss		–		4	–	6	–	0
Holy Cross		–		3	–	6	–	1
San Jose State		–		3	–	7	–	0
Navy		–		2	–	8	–	0
Tulane		–		2	–	8	–	0
Pittsburgh		–		1	–	9	–	0
Rankings from AP Poll

The 1968 Boston College Eagles football team represented Boston College as an independent during the 1968 NCAA University Division football season. Led by first-year head coach Joe Yukica, the Eagles compiled a record of 6–3. Boston College played home games at Alumni Stadium in Chestnut Hill, Massachusetts.

== Schedule ==
Date	Time	Opponent	Site	Result	Attendance	Source
September 28		at Navy	Navy–Marine Corps Memorial Stadium; Annapolis, MD	W 49–15	23,302	
October 5		Buffalo	Alumni Stadium; Chestnut Hill, MA	W 31–12	19,200	
October 12		Villanova	Alumni Stadium; Chestnut Hill, MA	W 28–15	23,300	
October 19		at Tulane	Tulane Stadium; New Orleans, LA	L 14–28	14,200	
October 26		No. 4 Penn State	Alumni Stadium; Chestnut Hill, MA	L 0–29	25,272	
November 9	1:00 p.m.	at Army	Michie Stadium; West Point, NY	L 25–58	32,000	
November 16		VMI	Alumni Stadium; Chestnut Hill, MA	W 45–13	17,300	
November 23		at UMass	Alumni Stadium; Hadley, MA (rivalry)	W 21–6	12,000	
November 30		Holy Cross	Alumni Stadium; Chestnut Hill, MA (rivalry)	W 40–20	26,500	
Rankings from AP Poll released prior to the game

== Coaching staff ==
Position	Name	First Year at BC
Head coach	Joe Yukica	1968
Offensive Line	Bill Bowes	1968
Defensive backs	Pete Carmichael	1968
Freshmen	Joe Daniels	1968
Defensive ends / Linebackers	Bill Campbell	1968
Defensive Line	John W. Anderson	1968
Offensive Backfield	Jack Bicknell	1968

=== Roster ===
1968 Boston College Eagles football team roster
Players
Coaches
Offense

Pos.	#	Name	Class
RB	27	Dave Bennett	Sr
WR	81	John Bonistalli	So
OT	70	Bob Bouley	Jr
OT	79	John Brennan	Jr
RB	25	Jim Catone	So
G	63	Walt Cullen	Jr
OT	74	Joe Cunningham	Sr
RB	28	Paul Della Villa	Sr
C	52	John Egan	Sr
QB	19	Mike Fallon	Jr
WR	87	Barry Gallup	Sr
WR	21	George Gill	So
OT	77	Gary Guenther	So
QB	17	Frank Harris	So
RB	31	Mike Johnson	Jr
TE	85	Steve Kives	Jr
G	62	Mike Lardner	So
QB	16	Joe Marzetti	Sr
FB	42	Joe McDonald	Jr
TE	83	Jim O'Shea	So
OT	78	Tom Usdavinis	Sr
RB	33	Fred Willis	So

Defense

Pos.	#	Name	Class
LB	60	Gary Andrachik	Sr
DB	38	Bill Balmat	So
DL	84	Paul Cavanaugh	Sr
DL	88	Mike Daniels	So
DB	20	Gary Dancewicz	So
LB	59	Mondell Davis	Jr
DT	76	John Fitzgerald	Jr
DB	28	Jeff Fleming	Sr
DL	56	Bernie Galeckas	Jr
LB	82	Dick Gill	Jr
DB	34	Jim Grace	Sr
DT	75	Kerry Horman	Sr
LB	58	Jim King	Sr
DL	55	Dick Kroner	Sr
DT	71	Jim Millham	So
LB	50	Jim McCool	Jr
DB	39	John O'Donnell	So
DT	72	Jerry Ragosa	Sr
DB	23	John Salmon	Sr
DB	15	Dave Thomas	Sr
DB	40	Dan Zailskas	Sr

Special teams

Pos.	#	Name	Class
P	36	Mike Robertson	Sr

Head coach

- Joe Yukica

Coordinators/assistant coaches

Legend

- (C) Team captain
- (S) Suspended
- (I) Ineligible
- Injured
- Redshirt
