= 1968 Virginia Tech Gobblers football team =

American college football season

1968 Virginia Tech Gobblers football

Liberty Bowl, L 17–34 vs. Ole Miss
- Conference: Independent
- Record: 7–4
- Head coach: Jerry Claiborne (8th season)
- Home stadium: Lane Stadium

1968 NCAA University Division independents football records
| | Conf. | | | Overall |
| Team | W | L | T | W | | L | | T |
|---|---|---|---|---|---|---|---|---|
| No. 2 Penn State | | – | | 11 | – | 0 | – | 0 |
| Rutgers | | – | | 8 | – | 2 | – | 0 |
| West Texas State | | – | | 8 | – | 2 | – | 0 |
| No. 5 Notre Dame | | – | | 7 | – | 2 | – | 1 |
| Florida State | | – | | 8 | – | 3 | – | 0 |
| Air Force | | – | | 7 | – | 3 | – | 0 |
| Army | | – | | 7 | – | 3 | – | 0 |
| Buffalo | | – | | 7 | – | 3 | – | 0 |
| No. 18 Houston | | – | | 6 | – | 2 | – | 2 |
| Utah State | | – | | 7 | – | 3 | – | 0 |
| Boston College | | – | | 7 | – | 3 | – | 0 |
| West Virginia | | – | | 7 | – | 3 | – | 0 |
| Virginia Tech | | – | | 7 | – | 4 | – | 0 |
| Syracuse | | – | | 6 | – | 4 | – | 0 |
| Villanova | | – | | 6 | – | 4 | – | 0 |
| Xavier | | – | | 6 | – | 4 | – | 0 |
| Colgate | | – | | 5 | – | 5 | – | 0 |
| Dayton | | – | | 5 | – | 5 | – | 0 |
| Miami (FL) | | – | | 5 | – | 5 | – | 0 |
| New Mexico State | | – | | 5 | – | 5 | – | 0 |
| Georgia Tech | | – | | 4 | – | 6 | – | 0 |
| Southern Miss | | – | | 4 | – | 6 | – | 0 |
| Holy Cross | | – | | 3 | – | 6 | – | 1 |
| San Jose State | | – | | 3 | – | 7 | – | 0 |
| Navy | | – | | 2 | – | 8 | – | 0 |
| Tulane | | – | | 2 | – | 8 | – | 0 |
| Pittsburgh | | – | | 1 | – | 9 | – | 0 |
Rankings from AP Poll

The 1968 Virginia Tech Gobblers football team represented the Virginia Polytechnic Institute or VPI (now known as Virginia Polytechnic Institute and State University or Virginia Tech) as an independent during the 1968 NCAA University Division football season. Led by eighth-year head coach Jerry Claiborne the Gobblers compiled an overall record of 7–4 and with a loss against Ole Miss in the Liberty Bowl. VPI played home games at Lane Stadium in Blacksburg, Virginia.

== Schedule ==
| Date | Opponent | Site | TV | Result | Attendance | Source |
|---|---|---|---|---|---|---|
| September 21 | at No. 7 Alabama | Legion Field; Birmingham, AL | | L 7–14 | 63,759 | |
| September 28 | at William & Mary | Cary Field; Williamsburg, VA | | W 12–0 | 15,000 | |
| October 5 | Kansas State | Lane Stadium; Blacksburg, VA | | L 19–34 | 19,000 | |
| October 12 | Wake Forest^{†} | Lane Stadium; Blacksburg, VA | | W 7–6 | 31,000 | |
| October 18 | at No. 13 Miami (FL) | Miami Orange Bowl; Miami, FL (rivalry) | | L 8–13 | 36,844 | |
| October 26 | West Virginia | Lane Stadium; Blacksburg, VA (rivalry) | | W 27–12 | 33,000 | |
| November 2 | at No. 18 Florida State | Doak Campbell Stadium; Tallahassee, FL | | W 40–22 | 31,342 | |
| November 9 | Richmond | Lane Stadium; Blacksburg, VA | | W 31–18 | 12,000 | |
| November 16 | at South Carolina | Carolina Stadium; Columbia, SC | | W 17–6 | 40,137 | |
| November 28 | vs. VMI | Victory Stadium; Roanoke, VA (rivalry) | | W 55–6 | 17,000 | |
| December 14 | vs. Ole Miss | Memphis Memorial Stadium; Memphis, TN (Liberty Bowl) | ABC | L 17–34 | 46,206 | |
^{†}Homecoming; Rankings from AP Poll released prior to the game

== Game summaries ==
=== At No. 7 Alabama ===
Tech lost 14-7 to the 7th-ranked team in the nation in front of a crowd of 63,759 in Birmingham. At the time it was the largest audience in school history. The Gobblers scored on a blocked punt by Larry Creekmore recovered in the end zone by Jud Bronwell. Tech was dominated by the Crimson Tide defense, racking up only three first downs, the first coming in the fourth quarter.

=== At William & Mary ===
The Tech special teams scored a touchdown and a safety by blocking two punts and put up its first offensive points of the year with a 20-yard field goal by Jack Simscack. The Gobblers defense pitched a shutout, helped by defensive back Ron Davidson who picked off three W&M passes.

== Roster ==
The following players were members of the 1968 football team according to the roster published in the 1969 edition of The Bugle, the Virginia Tech yearbook.

VPI 1968 roster
| Art Aguilar; David Bailey; Frank Beamer; David Binko; Preston Blackburn; Steve Bocko; William G. "Jerry" Boykin; Jud Brownell; James Edward "Eddie" Carter; Dennis Cogan; Chris Frank Collis; George Constantinides; Donald Dewitt Cooke; Larry Creekmore; J. Dee Crigger; Daniel Cupp; Ron Davidson; Peter Francis Dawyot; Nick DelViscio | Kenneth Wayne Edwards; Doug Gainous; Jerry Green; George Butch Hall; Waddey Harvey; Bert Henderson; D. Hickman; Wayne Humphries; Hank Immel; John Ivanac; Al Kincaid; Larry Kushner; Dickie Longerbeam; Leonard Angelo Luongo; T. MacDonald; John Lawrence Maxwell; Tom Mikulski; Frederick Marshall Mooney; Thomas Irwin Parks | James Anthony Pigninelli; Rick Piland; Paul Ripley; Gil Schwabe; Jack Simcsak; Bill Skinner; Bobby Slaughter; Leonard James Smith; Terry Smoot; L. Wayne Stonesifer; Larry Duke Strager; Tom Swords; Perry Tiberio; John Randolph Treadwell; Joe Tucker; Danny Waller; Mike Widger; S. Womack |
