= 1968 Penn State Nittany Lions football team =

American college football season

1968 Penn State Nittany Lions football

Eastern champion Orange Bowl champion

Orange Bowl, W 15–14 vs. Kansas
- Conference: Independent

Ranking
- Coaches: No. 3
- AP: No. 2
- Record: 11–0
- Head coach: Joe Paterno (3rd season)
- Offensive scheme: I formation
- Defensive coordinator: Jim O'Hora (3rd season)
- Base defense: 4–3
- Captains: John Kulka; Mike Reid; Steve Smear
- Home stadium: Beaver Stadium

1968 NCAA University Division independents football records
	Conf.			Overall
Team	W	L	T	W		L		T
No. 2 Penn State		–		11	–	0	–	0
Rutgers		–		8	–	2	–	0
West Texas State		–		8	–	2	–	0
No. 5 Notre Dame		–		7	–	2	–	1
Florida State		–		8	–	3	–	0
Air Force		–		7	–	3	–	0
Army		–		7	–	3	–	0
Buffalo		–		7	–	3	–	0
No. 18 Houston		–		6	–	2	–	2
Utah State		–		7	–	3	–	0
Boston College		–		7	–	3	–	0
West Virginia		–		7	–	3	–	0
Virginia Tech		–		7	–	4	–	0
Syracuse		–		6	–	4	–	0
Villanova		–		6	–	4	–	0
Xavier		–		6	–	4	–	0
Colgate		–		5	–	5	–	0
Dayton		–		5	–	5	–	0
Miami (FL)		–		5	–	5	–	0
New Mexico State		–		5	–	5	–	0
Georgia Tech		–		4	–	6	–	0
Southern Miss		–		4	–	6	–	0
Holy Cross		–		3	–	6	–	1
San Jose State		–		3	–	7	–	0
Navy		–		2	–	8	–	0
Tulane		–		2	–	8	–	0
Pittsburgh		–		1	–	9	–	0
Rankings from AP Poll

The 1968 Penn State Nittany Lions football team represented Pennsylvania State University as an independent during the 1968 NCAA University Division football season. Led by third-year head coach Joe Paterno, the Nittany Lions compiled a perfect record of 11–0 with a win in the Orange Bowl over Kansas. The team played home games at Beaver Stadium in University Park, Pennsylvania.

The 1968 team was Paterno's first perfect season. Despite going 11–0, the Nittany Lions finished behind 10–0 Ohio State in the final AP poll (conducted after bowl season), and behind Ohio State and 9–0–1 USC in the final Coaches Poll (conducted before bowl season).

== Schedule ==
Date	Time	Opponent	Rank	Site	TV	Result	Attendance	Source
September 21		Navy	No. 10	Beaver Stadium; University Park, PA		W 31–6	49,273	
September 28		Kansas State	No. 4	Beaver Stadium; University Park, PA		W 25–9	45,024	
October 5		at West Virginia	No. 3	Mountaineer Field; Morgantown, WV (rivalry)		W 31–20	34,500	
October 12		at UCLA	No. 3	Los Angeles Memorial Coliseum; Los Angeles, CA	ABC	W 21–6	35,778	
October 26		at Boston College	No. 4	Alumni Stadium; Chestnut Hill, MA		W 29–0	25,272	
November 2	1:00 p.m.	Army^{†}	No. 4	Beaver Stadium; University Park, PA		W 28–24	49,122	
November 9		Miami (FL)	No. 4	Beaver Stadium; University Park, PA		W 22–7	49,863	
November 16		at Maryland	No. 3	Byrd Stadium; College Park, MD (rivalry)		W 57–13	30,000	
November 23		at Pittsburgh	No. 3	Pitt Stadium; Pittsburgh, PA (rivalry)		W 65–9	31,224	
December 7		Syracuse	No. 3	Beaver Stadium; University Park, PA (rivalry)	ABC	W 30–12	38,000	
January 1, 1969		vs. No. 6 Kansas	No. 3	Miami Orange Bowl; Miami, FL (Orange Bowl)	NBC	W 15–14	77,719	
^{†}Homecoming; Rankings from AP Poll released prior to the game; All times are in Eastern time; Source:

== Roster ==
1968 Penn State Nittany Lions football team roster
Players
Coaches
Offense

Pos.	#	Name	Class
RB	36	Don Abbey	Jr
WR	44	Charlie Adams	So
WR	80	Leon Angevine	Sr
OT	73	Dave Bradley	Sr
QB	22	Chuck Burkhart	Sr
WR	23	Bob Campbell	Sr
QB	11	Wally Cirafesi	Jr
QB	25	Mike Cooper	So
WR	88	Greg Edmonds	So
RB	42	Fran Ganter	So
G	63	Tom Jackson	Jr
C	56	Warren Koegel	So
OT	78	John Kulka	Sr
TE	82	Ted Kwalick	Sr
RB	24	Charlie Pittman	Jr
G	64	David Rakiecki	Jr
RB	46	Joel Ramich	So
OT	78	Vic Surma	So
RB	41	Charlie Wilson	So
G	60	Charlie Zapiec	So

Defense

Pos.	#	Name	Class
DT	74	George Daugherty	Sr
DT	72	John Ebersole	Jr
S	27	John Haberman	Sr
LB	33	Jack Ham	So
LB	51	Gary Hull	So
DB	47	Paul Johnson	Jr
LB	40	Pete Johnson	Jr
LB	55	Jim Kates	Jr
DE	15	Mark Koiwai	So
DT	71	Doug Krenicky	Sr
DE	85	George Kulka	Jr
DB	31	George Landis	So
LB	35	Dennis Onkotz	Jr
LB	52	David Radakovich	Jr
DT	68	Mike Reid	Jr
DL	76	Steve Smear	Jr
LB	10	Mike Smith	So
DB	26	Neal Smith	Jr

Special teams

Pos.	#	Name	Class

Head coach

- Joe Paterno

Coordinators/assistant coaches

- Earl Bruce
- Joe McMullen
- Jim O'Hora
- Frank Patrick
- Bob Phillips
- Dan Radakovich
- George Welsh
- J. T. White

Legend

- (C) Team captain
- (S) Suspended
- (I) Ineligible
- Injured
- Redshirt

Roster

== After the season ==
=== 1969 NFL/AFL draft ===
Five Nittany Lions were drafted in the 1969 NFL/AFL draft.

Round	Pick	Overall	Name	Position	Team
1st	7	7	Ted Kwalick	Tight end	San Francisco 49ers
2nd	12	38	Dave Bradley	Offensive guard	Green Bay Packers
4th	4	82	Bob Campbell	Wide receiver	Pittsburgh Steelers
7th	18	174	John Kulka	Offensive guard	Miami Dolphins
15th	3	367	Leon Angevine	Running back/Wide receiver	Philadelphia Eagles
