= 1968 Tulane Green Wave football team =

American college football season

1968 Tulane Green Wave football
- Conference: Independent
- Record: 2–8
- Head coach: Jim Pittman (3rd season)
- Home stadium: Tulane Stadium

1968 NCAA University Division independents football records
	Conf.			Overall
Team	W	L	T	W		L		T
No. 2 Penn State		–		11	–	0	–	0
Rutgers		–		8	–	2	–	0
West Texas State		–		8	–	2	–	0
No. 5 Notre Dame		–		7	–	2	–	1
Florida State		–		8	–	3	–	0
Air Force		–		7	–	3	–	0
Army		–		7	–	3	–	0
Buffalo		–		7	–	3	–	0
No. 18 Houston		–		6	–	2	–	2
Utah State		–		7	–	3	–	0
Boston College		–		7	–	3	–	0
West Virginia		–		7	–	3	–	0
Virginia Tech		–		7	–	4	–	0
Syracuse		–		6	–	4	–	0
Villanova		–		6	–	4	–	0
Xavier		–		6	–	4	–	0
Colgate		–		5	–	5	–	0
Dayton		–		5	–	5	–	0
Miami (FL)		–		5	–	5	–	0
New Mexico State		–		5	–	5	–	0
Georgia Tech		–		4	–	6	–	0
Southern Miss		–		4	–	6	–	0
Holy Cross		–		3	–	6	–	1
San Jose State		–		3	–	7	–	0
Navy		–		2	–	8	–	0
Tulane		–		2	–	8	–	0
Pittsburgh		–		1	–	9	–	0
Rankings from AP Poll

The 1968 Tulane Green Wave football team was an American football team that represented Tulane University as an independent during the 1968 NCAA University Division football season. In its third year under head coach Jim Pittman, the team compiled a 2–8 record and was outscored by a total of 300 to 163.

The team gained an average of 195.0 rushing yards and 101.5 passing yards per game. On defense, it gave up an average of 237.5 rushing yards and 199.6 passing yards per game. Tulane's individual statistical leaders included quarterback Wayne Francingues with 938 passing yards, Warren Bankston with 473 rushing yards, and Sonny Pisarich with 279 receiving yards.

The team played its home games at Tulane Stadium in New Orleans.

== Schedule ==
Date	Opponent	Site	Result	Attendance	Source
September 14	at Houston	Houston Astrodome; Houston, TX	L 7–54	36,415	
September 28	Texas A&M	Tulane Stadium; New Orleans, LA	L 3–35	21,600	
October 5	Tampa	Tulane Stadium; New Orleans, LA	L 14–17	17,000	
October 12	at No. 7 Florida	Florida Field; Gainesville, FL	L 3–24	48,106	
October 19	Boston College	Tulane Stadium; New Orleans, LA	W 28–14	14,200	
October 26	at Georgia Tech	Grant Field; Atlanta, GA	L 19–23	47,481	
November 2	at Vanderbilt	Dudley Field; Nashville, TN	L 7–21	16,469	
November 9	Tulsa	Tulane Stadium; New Orleans, LA	W 25–15	10,260	
November 16	at Virginia	Scott Stadium; Charlottesville, VA	L 47–63	14,500	
November 23	LSU	Tulane Stadium; New Orleans, LA (Battle for the Rag)	L 10–34	55,000	
Rankings from AP Poll released prior to the game

== Roster ==
1968 Tulane Green Wave football team roster
Players
Coaches
Offense

Pos.	#	Name	Class
RB	19	Warren Bankston	Sr
QB	10	Wayne Francingues	Jr
C	50	Howard Moore	Sr
OT	76	Dean Smith	Sr

Defense

Pos.	#	Name	Class
LB	56	Ray Hester	So
LB	32	Rick Kingrea	So
DE	77	Mike Walker	So

Special teams

Pos.	#	Name	Class

Head coach

- Jim Pittman

Coordinators/assistant coaches

Legend

- (C) Team captain
- (S) Suspended
- (I) Ineligible
- Injured
- Redshirt
