= 1968 Richmond Spiders football team =

American college football season

1968 Richmond Spiders football

SoCon champion Tangerine Bowl champion

Tangerine Bowl, W 49–42 vs. Ohio
- Conference: Southern Conference
- Record: 8–3 (6–0 SoCon)
- Head coach: Frank Jones (3rd season)
- Captains: B. O'Brien; M. Bixiones; T. Johnson
- Home stadium: City Stadium

1968 Southern Conference football standings
	Conf.					Overall
Team	W		L		T	W		L		T
Richmond $	6	–	0	–	0	8	–	3	–	0
The Citadel	4	–	2	–	0	5	–	5	–	0
East Carolina	2	–	2	–	0	4	–	6	–	0
William & Mary	2	–	2	–	0	3	–	7	–	0
Davidson	1	–	3	–	0	3	–	6	–	0
VMI	1	–	3	–	0	1	–	9	–	0
Furman	0	–	4	–	0	1	–	9	–	0
$ – Conference champion

The 1968 Richmond Spiders football team was an American football team that represented the University of Richmond as a member of the Southern Conference (SoCon) during the 1968 NCAA University Division football season. In their third season under head coach Frank Jones, Richmond compiled an 8–3 record, with a mark of 6–0 in conference play, finishing as SoCon champion. In the postseason, the Spiders defeated Ohio in the Tangerine Bowl.

== Schedule ==
Date	Opponent	Site	Result	Attendance	Source
September 14	at Toledo*	Glass Bowl; Toledo, OH	L 14–31	13,075	
September 21	at West Virginia*	Mountaineer Field; Morgantown, WV	L 0–17	25,000	
September 28	Davidson	City Stadium; Richmond, VA	W 24–14		
October 12	at The Citadel	Johnson Hagood Stadium; Charleston, SC	W 21–16		
October 19	Furman	City Stadium; Richmond, VA	W 34–0	3,000	
October 26	at East Carolina	Ficklen Memorial Stadium; Greenville, NC	W 31–7		
November 2	VMI	City Stadium; Richmond, VA (rivalry)	W 35–0	15,000	
November 9	at Virginia Tech*	Lane Stadium; Blacksburg, VA	L 18–31	12,000	
November 16	at Southern Miss*	Faulkner Field; Hattiesburg, MS	W 33–7	7,500	
November 23	William & Mary	City Stadium; Richmond, VA (rivalry)	W 31–6	12,000	
December 27	vs. No. 15 Ohio*	Tangerine Bowl; Orlando, FL (Tangerine Bowl)	W 49–42	16,114	
*Non-conference game; Rankings from AP Poll released prior to the game
