= 1968 Air Force Falcons football team =

American college football season

1968 Air Force Falcons football
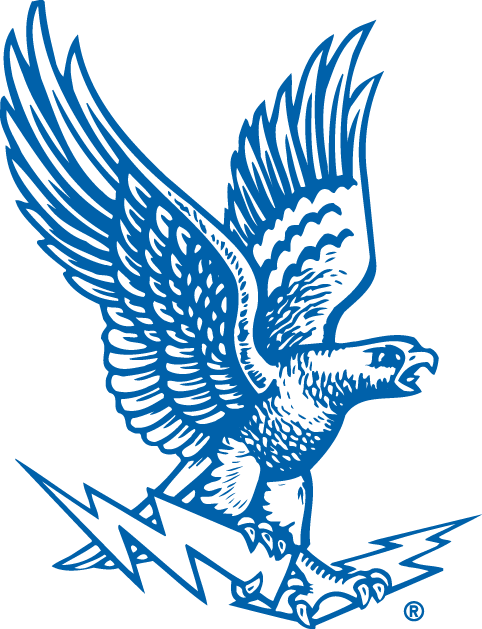
- Conference: Independent
- Record: 7–3
- Head coach: Ben Martin (11th season)
- Captain: Dick Swanson
- Home stadium: Falcon Stadium

1968 NCAA University Division independents football records
	Conf.			Overall
Team	W	L	T	W		L		T
No. 2 Penn State		–		11	–	0	–	0
Rutgers		–		8	–	2	–	0
West Texas State		–		8	–	2	–	0
No. 5 Notre Dame		–		7	–	2	–	1
Florida State		–		8	–	3	–	0
Air Force		–		7	–	3	–	0
Army		–		7	–	3	–	0
Buffalo		–		7	–	3	–	0
No. 18 Houston		–		6	–	2	–	2
Utah State		–		7	–	3	–	0
Boston College		–		7	–	3	–	0
West Virginia		–		7	–	3	–	0
Virginia Tech		–		7	–	4	–	0
Syracuse		–		6	–	4	–	0
Villanova		–		6	–	4	–	0
Xavier		–		6	–	4	–	0
Colgate		–		5	–	5	–	0
Dayton		–		5	–	5	–	0
Miami (FL)		–		5	–	5	–	0
New Mexico State		–		5	–	5	–	0
Georgia Tech		–		4	–	6	–	0
Southern Miss		–		4	–	6	–	0
Holy Cross		–		3	–	6	–	1
San Jose State		–		3	–	7	–	0
Navy		–		2	–	8	–	0
Tulane		–		2	–	8	–	0
Pittsburgh		–		1	–	9	–	0
Rankings from AP Poll

The 1968 Air Force Falcons football team represented the United States Air Force Academy as an independent during the 1968 NCAA University Division football season. Led by 11th-year head coach Ben Martin, the Falcons compiled a record of 7–3 and outscored their opponents 251–156. Air Force played their home games at Falcon Stadium in Colorado Springs, Colorado.

== Schedule ==
Date	Opponent	Site	Result	Attendance	Source
September 21	vs. No. 6 Florida	Tampa Stadium; Tampa, FL	L 20–23	52,626	
September 28	No. 20 Wyoming	Falcon Stadium; Colorado Springs, CO	W 10–3	29,920	
October 5	at Stanford	Stanford Stadium; Stanford, CA	L 13–24	35,000	
October 12	vs. Navy	Soldier Field; Chicago, IL (rivalry)	W 26–20	51,473	
October 19	at Colorado State	Hughes Stadium; Fort Collins, CO (rivalry)	W 31–0	28,906	
October 26	at Pittsburgh	Pitt Stadium; Pittsburgh, PA	W 27–14	29,038	
November 2	North Carolina	Falcon Stadium; Colorado Springs, CO	W 28–15	24,596	
November 9	Arizona	Falcon Stadium; Colorado Springs, CO	L 10–14	32,196	
November 16	Tulsa	Falcon Stadium; Colorado Springs, CO	W 28–8	32,175	
November 23	at Colorado	Folsom Field; Boulder, CO	W 58–35	42,300	
Rankings from AP Poll released prior to the game

== Roster ==
1968 Air Force Falcons football team roster
Players
Coaches
Offense

Pos.	#	Name	Class
QB	18	Gary Baxter	Sr
OT	76	John Bierie	So
WR		Ernie Jennings	So
WR	85	Charlie Longnecker	Jr
TE	89	Dave MacGhee	Jr
RB	41	Curtis Martin	So
C	55	George Rayl	Jr
OT	75	Dick Swanson	Sr

Defense

Pos.	#	Name	Class
LB	33	Phil Bauman	So
DT	77	Ed Epping	Jr
DT	71	Ken Hamlin	Sr
DE	82	Mark Ewig	Jr
DB	41	Ralph Hallenbeck	Sr
LB	23	Glenn Leimbach	Jr
DE	31	Dennis Leuthauser	Jr
DB	44	Terry Petrzelka	Jr

Special teams

Pos.	#	Name	Class

Head coach

- Ben Martin

Coordinators/assistant coaches

Legend

- (C) Team captain
- (S) Suspended
- (I) Ineligible
- Injured
- Redshirt
