= 1968 Army Cadets football team =

American college football season

1968 Army Cadets football
- Conference: Independent
- Record: 7–3
- Head coach: Tom Cahill (3rd season)
- Defensive coordinator: Richard S. Lyon (2nd season)
- Captain: Ken Johnson
- Home stadium: Michie Stadium

1968 NCAA University Division independents football records
| | Conf. | | | Overall |
| Team | W | L | T | W | | L | | T |
|---|---|---|---|---|---|---|---|---|
| No. 2 Penn State | | – | | 11 | – | 0 | – | 0 |
| Rutgers | | – | | 8 | – | 2 | – | 0 |
| West Texas State | | – | | 8 | – | 2 | – | 0 |
| No. 5 Notre Dame | | – | | 7 | – | 2 | – | 1 |
| Florida State | | – | | 8 | – | 3 | – | 0 |
| Air Force | | – | | 7 | – | 3 | – | 0 |
| Army | | – | | 7 | – | 3 | – | 0 |
| Buffalo | | – | | 7 | – | 3 | – | 0 |
| No. 18 Houston | | – | | 6 | – | 2 | – | 2 |
| Utah State | | – | | 7 | – | 3 | – | 0 |
| Boston College | | – | | 7 | – | 3 | – | 0 |
| West Virginia | | – | | 7 | – | 3 | – | 0 |
| Virginia Tech | | – | | 7 | – | 4 | – | 0 |
| Syracuse | | – | | 6 | – | 4 | – | 0 |
| Villanova | | – | | 6 | – | 4 | – | 0 |
| Xavier | | – | | 6 | – | 4 | – | 0 |
| Colgate | | – | | 5 | – | 5 | – | 0 |
| Dayton | | – | | 5 | – | 5 | – | 0 |
| Miami (FL) | | – | | 5 | – | 5 | – | 0 |
| New Mexico State | | – | | 5 | – | 5 | – | 0 |
| Georgia Tech | | – | | 4 | – | 6 | – | 0 |
| Southern Miss | | – | | 4 | – | 6 | – | 0 |
| Holy Cross | | – | | 3 | – | 6 | – | 1 |
| San Jose State | | – | | 3 | – | 7 | – | 0 |
| Navy | | – | | 2 | – | 8 | – | 0 |
| Tulane | | – | | 2 | – | 8 | – | 0 |
| Pittsburgh | | – | | 1 | – | 9 | – | 0 |
Rankings from AP Poll

The 1968 Army Cadets football team represented the United States Military Academy as an independent during the 1968 NCAA University Division football season. In their third year under head coach Tom Cahill, the Cadets compiled a 7–3 record and outscored their opponents by a combined total of 270 to 137. In the annual Army–Navy Game, the Cadets defeated the Midshipmen by a 21 to 14 score. The Cadets lost to Vanderbilt by a 17 to 13 score, Penn State by 28 to 24, and to Missouri by a 7 to 3 score.

Army linebacker Ken Johnson was selected by the American Football Coaches Association as a first-team player on the 1968 College Football All-America Team.

== Schedule ==
| Date | Time | Opponent | Site | TV | Result | Attendance | Source |
|---|---|---|---|---|---|---|---|
| September 21 | 2:00 p.m. | The Citadel | Michie Stadium; West Point, NY | | W 34–14 | 23,000–25,000 | |
| September 28 | 2:00 p.m. | Vanderbilt | Michie Stadium; West Point, NY | | L 13–17 | 23,000 | |
| October 5 | 2:30 p.m. | at Missouri | Memorial Stadium; Columbia, MO | | L 3–7 | 58,576 | |
| October 12 | 2:00 p.m. | No. 16 California | Michie Stadium; West Point, NY | | W 10–7 | 32,000 | |
| October 19 | 2:00 p.m. | at Rutgers | Rutgers Stadium; Piscataway, NJ | | W 24–0 | 28,000 | |
| October 26 | 2:00 p.m. | Duke | Michie Stadium; West Point, NY | | W 57–25 | 32,000 | |
| November 2 | 1:00 p.m. | at Penn State | Beaver Stadium; University Park, PA | | L 24–28 | 49,122 | |
| November 9 | 1:00 p.m. | Boston College | Michie Stadium; West Point, NY | | W 58–25 | 32,000 | |
| November 16 | 1:30 p.m. | at Pittsburgh | Pitt Stadium; Pittsburgh, PA | | W 26–0 | 28,072 | |
| November 30 | 1:30 p.m. | vs. Navy | John F. Kennedy Stadium; Philadelphia, PA (Army–Navy Game) | ABC | W 21–14 | 102,000 | |
Rankings from AP Poll released prior to the game; All times are in Eastern time

== Game summaries ==
=== The Citadel ===
| | 1 | 2 | 3 | 4 | Total |
|---|---|---|---|---|---|
| Bulldogs | | | | | 0 |
| Cadets | | | | | 0 |

=== Vanderbilt ===
| | 1 | 2 | 3 | 4 | Total |
|---|---|---|---|---|---|
| Commodores | 0 | 17 | 0 | 0 | 17 |
| Cadets | 7 | 0 | 6 | 0 | 13 |

=== At Missouri ===
| | 1 | 2 | 3 | 4 | Total |
|---|---|---|---|---|---|
| Cadets | 0 | 0 | 0 | 3 | 3 |
| Tigers | 7 | 0 | 0 | 0 | 7 |

=== California ===
| | 1 | 2 | 3 | 4 | Total |
|---|---|---|---|---|---|
| Golden Bears | | | | | 0 |
| Cadets | | | | | 0 |

=== At Rutgers ===
| | 1 | 2 | 3 | 4 | Total |
|---|---|---|---|---|---|
| Cadets | 14 | 3 | 0 | 7 | 24 |
| Scarlet Knights | 0 | 0 | 0 | 0 | 0 |

=== Duke ===
| | 1 | 2 | 3 | 4 | Total |
|---|---|---|---|---|---|
| Blue Devils | | | | | 0 |
| Cadets | | | | | 0 |

=== At Penn State ===
| | 1 | 2 | 3 | 4 | Total |
|---|---|---|---|---|---|
| Cadets | 0 | 7 | 0 | 17 | 24 |
| Nittany Lions | 9 | 0 | 7 | 12 | 28 |

=== Boston College ===
| | 1 | 2 | 3 | 4 | Total |
|---|---|---|---|---|---|
| Eagles | | | | | 0 |
| Cadets | | | | | 0 |

=== At Pittsburgh ===
| | 1 | 2 | 3 | 4 | Total |
|---|---|---|---|---|---|
| Cadets | 0 | 6 | 7 | 13 | 26 |
| Panthers | 0 | 0 | 0 | 0 | 0 |

=== vs Navy ===
| | 1 | 2 | 3 | 4 | Total |
|---|---|---|---|---|---|
| Cadets | 7 | 7 | 7 | 0 | 21 |
| Midshipmen | 0 | 7 | 7 | 0 | 14 |

== Roster ==
1968 Army Cadets football team roster
Players
Coaches
Offense

| Pos. | # | Name | Class |
|---|---|---|---|
| RB | | Charlie Jarvis | Sr |
| QB | | Steve Lindell | Sr |
| FB | | Lynn Moore | Jr |
| QB | | Jimmy O'Toole |

Defense

| Pos. | # | Name | Class |

Special teams

| Pos. | # | Name | Class |

Head coach

- Tom Cahill

Coordinators/assistant coaches

Legend

- (C) Team captain
- (S) Suspended
- (I) Ineligible
- Injured
- Redshirt
