= Bob King (American football coach) =

American football player and coach (1913–1994)

Biographical details
- Born: June 3, 1913; South Carolina, U.S.
- Died: June 19, 1994 (aged 81); Augusta, Georgia, U.S.

Playing career
- 1934–1936: Furman
- Position: End

Coaching career (HC unless noted)
- 1947–1957: Illinois (ends)
- 1958–1972: Furman

Head coaching record
- Overall: 60–88–4

Accomplishments and honors

Awards
- SoCon Coach of the Year (1970); First-team All-SoCon (1936)

Robert Burrow King (June 3, 1913 – June 19, 1994) was an American football coach. He served as the head football coach at Furman University from 1958 to 1972. He had previously been an assistant football coach for ends at the University of Illinois for 11 years. He is a member of the South Carolina Athletic Hall of Fame and was Southern Conference Media Coach of the Year in 1970. He graduated from Furman in 1937 where he played on the football team. He was succeeded by Art Baker as Furman head coach in 1973.

== Head coaching record ==
Year	Team	Overall	Conference	Standing	Bowl/playoffs
Furman Purple Hurricane / Paladins (Southern Conference) (1958–1972)
1958	Furman	2–7	1–2	8th	
1959	Furman	3–7	3–2	4th	
1960	Furman	5–4–1	2–2	5th	
1961	Furman	7–3	2–2	5th	
1962	Furman	4–6	2–2	5th	
1963	Furman	7–3	3–2	4th	
1964	Furman	3–7	1–4	T–8th	
1965	Furman	5–5	2–3	T–6th	
1966	Furman	2–7–1	1–4	T–8th	
1967	Furman	5–5	2–3	T–5th	
1968	Furman	1–9	0–4	7th	
1969	Furman	1–8–1	0–4	T–6th	
1970	Furman	8–3	3–2	3rd	
1971	Furman	5–5–1	2–3	5th	
1972	Furman	2–9	1–6	7th	
Furman:		60–88–4	25–45		
Total:		60–88–4			
