= 1968 Southern Miss Southerners football team =

American college football season

1968 Southern Miss Southerners football
- Conference: Independent
- Record: 4–6
- Head coach: Thad Vann (20th season)
- Home stadium: Faulkner Field

1968 NCAA University Division independents football records
	Conf.			Overall
Team	W	L	T	W		L		T
No. 2 Penn State		–		11	–	0	–	0
Rutgers		–		8	–	2	–	0
West Texas State		–		8	–	2	–	0
No. 5 Notre Dame		–		7	–	2	–	1
Florida State		–		8	–	3	–	0
Air Force		–		7	–	3	–	0
Army		–		7	–	3	–	0
Buffalo		–		7	–	3	–	0
No. 18 Houston		–		6	–	2	–	2
Utah State		–		7	–	3	–	0
Boston College		–		7	–	3	–	0
West Virginia		–		7	–	3	–	0
Virginia Tech		–		7	–	4	–	0
Syracuse		–		6	–	4	–	0
Villanova		–		6	–	4	–	0
Xavier		–		6	–	4	–	0
Colgate		–		5	–	5	–	0
Dayton		–		5	–	5	–	0
Miami (FL)		–		5	–	5	–	0
New Mexico State		–		5	–	5	–	0
Georgia Tech		–		4	–	6	–	0
Southern Miss		–		4	–	6	–	0
Holy Cross		–		3	–	6	–	1
San Jose State		–		3	–	7	–	0
Navy		–		2	–	8	–	0
Tulane		–		2	–	8	–	0
Pittsburgh		–		1	–	9	–	0
Rankings from AP Poll

The 1968 Southern Miss Southerners football team was an American football team that represented the University of Southern Mississippi as an independent during the 1968 NCAA University Division football season. In their twentieth year under head coach Thad Vann, the team compiled a 4–6 record.

== Schedule ==
Date	Opponent	Site	Result	Attendance	Source
September 21	at Southeastern Louisiana	Strawberry Stadium; Hammond, LA	W 27–15	7,000	
September 28	at No. 7 Alabama	Ladd Stadium; Mobile, AL	L 14–17	38,051	
October 5	East Carolina	Faulkner Field; Hattiesburg, MS	W 65–0	17,500	
October 12	at Mississippi State	Scott Field; Starkville, MS	W 47–14	22,000	
October 19	at No. 16 Ole Miss	Hemingway Stadium; Oxford, MS	L 13–21	34,000	
October 26	at Memphis State	Memphis Memorial Stadium; Memphis, TN (rivalry)	L 7–29	30,080	
November 2	Louisiana Tech^{†}	Faulkner Field; Hattiesburg, MS (rivalry)	L 20–27	15,000	
November 9	at San Diego State	San Diego Stadium; San Diego, CA	L 7–68	43,766	
November 16	Richmond	Faulkner Field; Hattiesburg, MS	L 7–33	7,500	
November 23	at Tampa	Tampa Stadium; Tampa, FL	W 21–7	20,890	
^{†}Homecoming; Rankings from AP Poll released prior to the game
