= Harry Anderson (American football) =

American football player and coach (1927–1997)

Biographical details
- Born: October 14, 1927; Los Angeles, California, U.S.
- Died: February 28, 1997 (aged 69); Capitola, California, U.S.

Coaching career (HC unless noted)
- 1951: Imperial HS (CA)
- 1952: Hoover HS (CA) (assistant)
- 1953–1958: Mission Bay HS (CA)
- 1958: San Jose State (freshmen)
- 1960–1964: San Jose State (ends)
- 1965–1968: San Jose State

Head coaching record
- Overall: 13–26 (college)

Harry Otto Anderson Jr. (October 14, 1927 – February 28, 1997) was an American football coach. He served as the head football coach at San Jose State University from 1965 to 1968, compiling a record of 13–26. One of the highlights of his career was a 1968 upset victory against BYU in the season finale. During his tenure, he coached future National Football League (NFL) head coach Al Saunders.

Anderson was born in Los Angeles. He earned a master's degree in education from the University of Southern California (USC) in 1951. Anderson began his coaching career that year at Imperial High School in Imperial, California. The next year, he was an assistant football coach at Hoover High School in San Diego. Anderson was the first head football coach at San Diego's Mission Bay High School, serving from 1953 to 1958. He was hired as freshman football coach at San Diego State in 1959, and was named ends coach the following season.

Anderson died from Parkinson's disease, on February 28, 1997, at Pacific Coast Manor in Capitola, California.

== Head coaching record ==
=== College ===
Year	Team	Overall	Conference	Standing	Bowl/playoffs
San Jose State Spartans (NCAA University Division independent) (1965–1958)
1965	San Jose State	5–5			
1966	San Jose State	3–7			
1967	San Jose State	2–7			
1968	San Jose State	3–7			
San Jose State:		13–26			
Total:		13–26			
