= 1968 Northwestern Wildcats football team =

American college football season

1968 Northwestern Wildcats football
- Conference: Big Ten Conference
- Record: 1–9 (1–6 Big Ten)
- Head coach: Alex Agase (5th season)
- MVP: Jack Rudnay
- Captains: John Cornell; Angelo Loukas
- Home stadium: Dyche Stadium

1968 Big Ten Conference football standings
	Conf.					Overall
Team	W		L		T	W		L		T
No. 1 Ohio State $	7	–	0	–	0	10	–	0	–	0
No. 12 Michigan	6	–	1	–	0	8	–	2	–	0
No. 10 Purdue	5	–	2	–	0	8	–	2	–	0
Minnesota	5	–	2	–	0	6	–	4	–	0
Indiana	4	–	3	–	0	6	–	4	–	0
Iowa	4	–	3	–	0	5	–	5	–	0
Michigan State	2	–	5	–	0	5	–	5	–	0
Illinois	1	–	6	–	0	1	–	9	–	0
Northwestern	1	–	6	–	0	1	–	9	–	0
Wisconsin	0	–	7	–	0	0	–	10	–	0
$ – Conference champion; Rankings from AP Poll

The 1968 Northwestern Wildcats team represented Northwestern University during the 1968 Big Ten Conference football season. In their fifth year under head coach Alex Agase, the Wildcats compiled a 1–9 record (1–6 against Big Ten Conference opponents) and finished in a tie for eighth place in the Big Ten Conference.

The team's offensive leaders were quarterback Dave Shelbourne with 1,358 passing yards, Bob Olson with 342 rushing yards, and Bruce Hubbard with 551 receiving yards.

== Schedule ==
Date	Opponent	Site	Result	Attendance	Source
September 20	at No. 19 Miami (FL)*	Miami Orange Bowl; Miami, FL	L 7–28	37,035	
September 28	No. 3 USC*	Dyche Stadium; Evanston, IL	L 7–24	47,277	
October 5	No. 1 Purdue	Dyche Stadium; Evanston, IL	L 6–43	45,163	
October 12	at No. 5 Notre Dame*	Notre Dame Stadium; Notre Dame, IN (rivalry)	L 7–27	59,075	
October 19	at No. 2 Ohio State	Ohio Stadium; Columbus, OH	L 21–45	83,454	
October 26	Wisconsin	Dyche Stadium; Evanston, IL	W 13–10	33,133	
November 2	No. 9 Michigan	Dyche Stadium; Evanston, IL (rivalry)	L 0–35	40,101	
November 9	at Iowa	Iowa Stadium; Iowa City, IA	L 34–68	44,876	
November 16	at Illinois	Memorial Stadium; Champaign, IL (rivalry)	L 0–14	42,099	
November 23	Michigan State	Dyche Stadium; Evanston, IL	L 14–31	28,245	
*Non-conference game; Rankings from AP Poll released prior to the game

== Roster ==
1968 Northwestern Wildcats football team roster
Players
Coaches
Offense

Pos.	#	Name	Class
QB	18	Mike Bryniarski	Jr
RB	34	Mike Adamle	So
TE	86	Pat Harrington	Jr
RB	22	Chico Kurzawski	Sr
G	59	Angelo Loukas (C)	Sr
C	58	Jack Rudnay	Jr
QB	15	Dave Shelbourne	So

Defense

Pos.	#	Name	Class
DB	12	Rich Dean	Sr
DT	71	Frank Mullins	Jr
DE	29	Ed Paquette	Sr
DT	72	John Rodman	So
LB	65	Don Ross	Jr
LB	56	Butch Ethington	Jr

Special teams

Pos.	#	Name	Class

Head coach

- Alex Agase

Coordinators/assistant coaches

Legend

- (C) Team captain
- (S) Suspended
- (I) Ineligible
- Injured
- Redshirt
