= 1968 San Jose State Spartans football team =

American college football season

1968 San Jose State Spartans football
- Conference: Independent
- Record: 3–7
- Head coach: Harry Anderson (4th season)
- Home stadium: Spartan Stadium

1968 NCAA University Division independents football records
	Conf.			Overall
Team	W	L	T	W		L		T
No. 2 Penn State		–		11	–	0	–	0
Rutgers		–		8	–	2	–	0
West Texas State		–		8	–	2	–	0
No. 5 Notre Dame		–		7	–	2	–	1
Florida State		–		8	–	3	–	0
Air Force		–		7	–	3	–	0
Army		–		7	–	3	–	0
Buffalo		–		7	–	3	–	0
No. 18 Houston		–		6	–	2	–	2
Utah State		–		7	–	3	–	0
Boston College		–		7	–	3	–	0
West Virginia		–		7	–	3	–	0
Virginia Tech		–		7	–	4	–	0
Syracuse		–		6	–	4	–	0
Villanova		–		6	–	4	–	0
Xavier		–		6	–	4	–	0
Colgate		–		5	–	5	–	0
Dayton		–		5	–	5	–	0
Miami (FL)		–		5	–	5	–	0
New Mexico State		–		5	–	5	–	0
Georgia Tech		–		4	–	6	–	0
Southern Miss		–		4	–	6	–	0
Holy Cross		–		3	–	6	–	1
San Jose State		–		3	–	7	–	0
Navy		–		2	–	8	–	0
Tulane		–		2	–	8	–	0
Pittsburgh		–		1	–	9	–	0
Rankings from AP Poll

The 1968 San Jose State Spartans football team represented San Jose State College—now known as San Jose State University—as an independent during the 1968 NCAA University Division football season. Led by Harry Anderson in his fourth and final season as head coach, the Spartans compiled a record of 3–7 and were outscored by opponents 403 to 148. The team played home games at Spartan Stadium in San Jose, California.

== Schedule ==
Date	Opponent	Site	Result	Attendance	Source
September 21	at Stanford	Stanford Stadium; Stanford, CA (rivalry)	L 20–68	34,000–34,500	
September 28	Fresno State	Spartan Stadium; San Jose, CA (rivalry)	W 25–21	9,700	
October 5	at No. 18 California	California Memorial Stadium; Berkeley, CA	L 0–46	25,000	
October 19	at New Mexico	University Stadium; Albuquerque, NM	W 55–24	12,089	
October 26	at San Diego State	San Diego Stadium; San Diego, CA	L 6–48	34,641	
November 2	at Pacific (CA)	Pacific Memorial Stadium; Stockton, CA (Victory Bell)	L 0–28	3,400	
November 9	Idaho	Spartan Stadium; San Jose, CA	L 17–35	10,500	
November 16	Washington State	Spartan Stadium; San Jose, CA	L 0–46	8,450	
November 23	at Arizona State	Sun Devil Stadium; Tempe, AZ	L 0–66	23,168	
November 30	BYU	Spartan Stadium; San Jose, CA	W 25–21	2,875	
Rankings from AP Poll released prior to the game

== Team players in the NFL/AFL ==
The following San Jose State players were selected in the 1969 NFL/AFL draft.

Player	Position	Round	Overall	NFL team
Walt Shockley	Running back	5	108	St. Louis Cardinals
Steve Alexakos	Guard	9	209	Boston Patriots
