= 1968 West Virginia Mountaineers football team =

American college football season

1968 West Virginia Mountaineers football
- Conference: Independent
- Record: 7–3
- Head coach: Jim Carlen (3rd season)
- Defensive coordinator: Richard Bell (1st season)
- Home stadium: Mountaineer Field

1968 NCAA University Division independents football records
	Conf.			Overall
Team	W	L	T	W		L		T
No. 2 Penn State		–		11	–	0	–	0
Rutgers		–		8	–	2	–	0
West Texas State		–		8	–	2	–	0
No. 5 Notre Dame		–		7	–	2	–	1
Florida State		–		8	–	3	–	0
Air Force		–		7	–	3	–	0
Army		–		7	–	3	–	0
Buffalo		–		7	–	3	–	0
No. 18 Houston		–		6	–	2	–	2
Utah State		–		7	–	3	–	0
Boston College		–		7	–	3	–	0
West Virginia		–		7	–	3	–	0
Virginia Tech		–		7	–	4	–	0
Syracuse		–		6	–	4	–	0
Villanova		–		6	–	4	–	0
Xavier		–		6	–	4	–	0
Colgate		–		5	–	5	–	0
Dayton		–		5	–	5	–	0
Miami (FL)		–		5	–	5	–	0
New Mexico State		–		5	–	5	–	0
Georgia Tech		–		4	–	6	–	0
Southern Miss		–		4	–	6	–	0
Holy Cross		–		3	–	6	–	1
San Jose State		–		3	–	7	–	0
Navy		–		2	–	8	–	0
Tulane		–		2	–	8	–	0
Pittsburgh		–		1	–	9	–	0
Rankings from AP Poll

The 1968 West Virginia Mountaineers football team represented West Virginia University in the 1968 NCAA University Division football season. It was the Mountaineers' 76th overall season and they competed as an independent. The team was led by head coach Jim Carlen, in his third year, and played their home games at Mountaineer Field in Morgantown, West Virginia. They finished the season with a record of 7–3.

== Schedule ==
Date	Opponent	Site	Result	Attendance	Source
September 21	Richmond	Mountaineer Field; Morgantown, WV	W 17–0	25,000	
September 28	at Pittsburgh	Pitt Stadium; Pittsburgh, PA (Backyard Brawl)	W 38–15	33,509	
October 5	No. 3 Penn State	Mountaineer Field; Morgantown, WV (rivalry)	L 20–31	34,500	
October 11	vs. VMI	Victory Stadium; Roanoke, VA (Harvest Bowl)	W 14–7	14,000	
October 19	vs. William & Mary	City Stadium; Richmond, VA (Tobacco Bowl)	W 20–0	15,500	
October 26	at Virginia Tech	Lane Stadium; Blacksburg, VA (rivalry)	L 12–27	33,000	
November 2	Kentucky	Mountaineer Field; Morgantown, WV	L 16–35	31,500	
November 9	at The Citadel	Johnson Hagood Stadium; Charleston, SC	W 17–0	7,150	
November 16	Villanova	Mountaineer Field; Morgantown, WV	W 30–20	18,000	
November 23	Syracuse	Mountaineer Field; Morgantown, WV (rivalry)	W 23–6	25,500	
Rankings from AP Poll released prior to the game

== Roster ==
1968 West Virginia Mountaineers football team roster
Players
Coaches
Offense

Pos.	#	Name	Class
QB	12	Garland Hudson	Jr
QB	14	Mike Sherwood	So
QB	16	Tom Digon	Sr
RB	33	Bob Gresham	So
RB	35	Eddie Silverio	Jr
FB	40	Gary Thall	Sr
RB	44	Jim Braxton	So

Defense

Pos.	#	Name	Class
DB	20	Thad Kucherawy	Jr
DE	21	John Hale	So
DB	22	Ron Pobolish	Jr
DB	23	John Finnerty	Sr
DB	24	Mike Slater	So
DB	25	Terry Snively	Jr
DB	26	Ed Ashby	Jr
DB	27	Del Gainer	Sr
DB	28	Mike Gillespie	So
DT	51	Carl Crennel	Jr
LB	54	Marvin Six	Jr
LB	81	Dale Farley	So

Special teams

Pos.	#	Name	Class
K	10	Ken Juskowich	Sr

Head coach

- Jim Carlen

Coordinators/assistant coaches

Legend

- (C) Team captain
- (S) Suspended
- (I) Ineligible
- Injured
- Redshirt
