= 1968 Notre Dame Fighting Irish football team =

American college football season

1968 Notre Dame Fighting Irish football
- Conference: Independent

Ranking
- Coaches: No. 8
- AP: No. 5
- Record: 7–2–1
- Head coach: Ara Parseghian (5th season)
- Captains: George Kunz; Bob Olson
- Home stadium: Notre Dame Stadium

1968 NCAA University Division independents football records
	Conf.			Overall
Team	W	L	T	W		L		T
No. 2 Penn State		–		11	–	0	–	0
Rutgers		–		8	–	2	–	0
West Texas State		–		8	–	2	–	0
No. 5 Notre Dame		–		7	–	2	–	1
Florida State		–		8	–	3	–	0
Air Force		–		7	–	3	–	0
Army		–		7	–	3	–	0
Buffalo		–		7	–	3	–	0
No. 18 Houston		–		6	–	2	–	2
Utah State		–		7	–	3	–	0
Boston College		–		7	–	3	–	0
West Virginia		–		7	–	3	–	0
Virginia Tech		–		7	–	4	–	0
Syracuse		–		6	–	4	–	0
Villanova		–		6	–	4	–	0
Xavier		–		6	–	4	–	0
Colgate		–		5	–	5	–	0
Dayton		–		5	–	5	–	0
Miami (FL)		–		5	–	5	–	0
New Mexico State		–		5	–	5	–	0
Georgia Tech		–		4	–	6	–	0
Southern Miss		–		4	–	6	–	0
Holy Cross		–		3	–	6	–	1
San Jose State		–		3	–	7	–	0
Navy		–		2	–	8	–	0
Tulane		–		2	–	8	–	0
Pittsburgh		–		1	–	9	–	0
Rankings from AP Poll

The 1968 Notre Dame Fighting Irish football team was an American football team that represented the University of Notre Dame as an independent during the 1968 NCAA University Division football season. In their fifth year under head coach Ara Parseghian, the Irish compiled a 7–2–1 record, outscored opponents by a total of 376 to 170, and were ranked No. 5 in the final AP poll. In three games against ranked opponents, they defeated No. 5 Oklahoma, lost to No.1 Purdue, and tied No. 2 USC.

Quarterback Terry Hanratty and tackle George Kunz were consensus first-team picks on the 1968 All-America college football team. Jim Seymour also received first-team All-America honors from multiple selectors. The team's statistical leaders included Hanratty (1,466 passing yards), Seymour (736 receiving yards), and Bob Gladieux (713 rushing yards, 84 points scored).

The team played its home games at Notre Dame Stadium in Notre Dame, Indiana.

== Schedule ==
Date	Time	Opponent	Rank	Site	TV	Result	Attendance	Source
September 21	2:30 p.m.	No. 5 Oklahoma	No. 3	Notre Dame Stadium; Notre Dame, IN		W 45–21	59,075	
September 28	2:00 p.m.	No. 1 Purdue	No. 2	Notre Dame Stadium; South Bend, IN (rivalry)	ABC	L 22–37	59,075	
October 5	2:30 p.m.	at Iowa	No. 5	Iowa Stadium; Iowa City, IA		W 51–28	58,043	
October 12	2:30 p.m.	Northwestern	No. 5	Notre Dame Stadium; South Bend, IN (rivalry)		W 27–7	59,075	
October 19	2:30 p.m.	Illinois	No. 6	Notre Dame Stadium; Notre Dame, IN		W 58–8	59,075	
October 26	1:30 p.m.	at Michigan State	No. 5	Spartan Stadium; East Lansing, MI (rivalry)	ABC	L 17–21	77,339	
November 2	1:30 p.m.	vs. Navy	No. 12	John F. Kennedy Stadium; Philadelphia, PA (rivalry)		W 45–14	63,738	
November 9	2:30 p.m.	Pittsburgh	No. 12	Notre Dame Stadium; Notre Dame, IN (rivalry)		W 56–7	59,075	
November 16	2:30 p.m.	Georgia Tech	No. 9	Notre Dame Stadium; Notre Dame, IN (rivalry)		W 34–6	59,075	
November 30	4:30 p.m.	at No. 2 USC	No. 9	Los Angeles Memorial Coliseum; Los Angeles, CA (rivalry)	ABC	T 21–21	82,659	
Rankings from AP Poll released prior to the game; All times are in Eastern time

== Game summaries ==
=== Oklahoma ===
Team	1	2	3	4	Total
Oklahoma	14	0	0	7	21
• Notre Dame	7	14	14	10	45

- Date: September 21
- Location: Notre Dame Stadium, South Bend, IN
- Game attendance: 59,075

Scoring summary
1	ND	Bob Gladieux 1-yard run (Scott Hempel kick)	ND 7-0
1	OU	Eddie Hinton 72-yard pass from Bob Warmack (Bruce Derr kick)	Tied 7-7
1	OU	Steve Zabel 16-yard pass from Bob Warmack (Bruce Derr kick)	OU 14-7
2	ND	Jim Seymour 10-yard pass from Terry Hanratty (Scott Hempel kick)	Tied 14-14
2	ND	Jim Seymour 7-yard pass from Terry Hanratty (Scott Hempel kick)	ND 21-14
3	ND	Bob Gladieux 1-yard run (Scott Hempel kick)	ND 28-14
3	ND	Bob Gladieux 1-yard run (Scott Hempel kick)	ND 35-14
4	ND	Scott Hempel 31-yard field goal	ND 38-14
4	OU	Steve Zabel 11-yard pass from Bob Warmack (Bruce Derr kick)	ND 38-21
4	ND	Chuck Landolfi 5-yard run (Scott Hempel kick)	ND 45-21

=== Purdue ===
Team	1	2	3	4	Total
• Purdue	3	20	0	14	37
Notre Dame	0	14	0	8	22

- Date: September 28
- Location: Notre Dame Stadium, South Bend, IN
- Game start: 1:00 p.m. CDT
- Game attendance: 59,075
- Referee: Gene Calhoun
- TV announcers (ABC): Chris Schenkel, Bud Wilkinson

Scoring summary
{{{Time}}}	{{{Team}}}	{{{Event}}}	{{{Score}}}
{{{Time}}}	{{{Team}}}	{{{Event}}}	{{{Score}}}

=== Iowa ===
Team	1	2	3	4	Total
• Notre Dame	21	10	6	14	51
Iowa	14	0	7	7	28

- Date: October 5
- Location: Iowa Stadium, Iowa City, IA
- Game start: 1:30 pm CDT

Scoring summary
{{{Time}}}	{{{Team}}}	{{{Event}}}	{{{Score}}}
{{{Time}}}	{{{Team}}}	{{{Event}}}	{{{Score}}}

=== Northwestern ===
Team	1	2	3	4	Total
Northwestern	0	0	0	7	7
• Notre Dame	7	0	6	14	27

- Date: October 12
- Location: Notre Dame Stadium, South Bend, IN
- Game start: 1:30 pm CDT
- Game attendance: 59,075

Scoring summary
{{{Time}}}	{{{Team}}}	{{{Event}}}	{{{Score}}}
{{{Time}}}	{{{Team}}}	{{{Event}}}	{{{Score}}}

=== Illinois ===
Team	1	2	3	4	Total
Illinois	0	0	8	0	8
• Notre Dame	14	10	27	7	58

- Date: October 19
- Location: Notre Dame Stadium, South Bend, IN
- Game start: 1:30 p.m. CDT
- Game attendance: 59,075

Scoring summary
{{{Time}}}	{{{Team}}}	{{{Event}}}	{{{Score}}}
{{{Time}}}	{{{Team}}}	{{{Event}}}	{{{Score}}}

=== Michigan State ===
Team	1	2	3	4	Total
Notre Dame	7	3	7	0	17
• Michigan St.	7	7	7	0	21

- Date: October 26
- Location: Spartan Stadium, East Lansing, MI
- TV announcers (ABC): Chris Schenkel, Bud Wilkinson

=== Navy ===
Team	1	2	3	4	Total
• Notre Dame	17	7	7	14	45
Navy	6	8	0	0	14

- Date: November 2
- Location: JFK Stadium, Philadelphia, PA
- Game start: 1:30 p.m. EST

Scoring summary
{{{Time}}}	{{{Team}}}	{{{Event}}}	{{{Score}}}
{{{Time}}}	{{{Team}}}	{{{Event}}}	{{{Score}}}

=== Pittsburgh ===
Team	1	2	3	4	Total
Pittsburgh	0	0	7	0	7
• Notre Dame	23	26	0	7	56

- Date: November 9
- Location: Notre Dame Stadium, South Bend, IN
- Game start: 1:30 pm CST

Scoring summary
{{{Time}}}	{{{Team}}}	{{{Event}}}	{{{Score}}}
{{{Time}}}	{{{Team}}}	{{{Event}}}	{{{Score}}}

=== Georgia Tech ===
Team	1	2	3	4	Total
Georgia Tech	0	0	0	6	6
• Notre Dame	7	7	6	14	34

- Date: November 16
- Location: Notre Dame Stadium,
- Game start: 1:30 p.m. CST

Scoring summary
{{{Time}}}	{{{Team}}}	{{{Event}}}	{{{Score}}}
{{{Time}}}	{{{Team}}}	{{{Event}}}	{{{Score}}}

=== USC ===
Team	1	2	3	4	Total
Notre Dame	14	7	0	0	21
USC	7	0	7	7	21

- Date: November 30
- Location: Los Angeles Memorial Coliseum
- Game start: 1:30 p.m. PST
- TV announcers (ABC): Chris Schenkel, Bud Wilkinson

Scoring summary
{{{Time}}}	{{{Team}}}	{{{Event}}}	{{{Score}}}
{{{Time}}}	{{{Team}}}	{{{Event}}}	{{{Score}}}

== Roster ==
1968 Notre Dame Fighting Irish football team roster
Players
Coaches
Offense

Pos.	#	Name	Class
RB	22	Denny Allan	So
RB	33	Bill Barz
QB	2	Bob Belden	Sr
OT	64	Terry Brennan	Jr
RB	21	Frank Criniti	Sr
G	56	Larry Dinardo	So
RB	38	Ron Dushney	Sr
WR	89	George Eaton	So
RB	20	Bob Gladieux	Sr
QB	5	Terry Hanratty	Sr
OT	78	George Kunz	Sr
RB	17	Charles Landolfi	Sr
G	79	Tom McKinley	Sr
C	55	Tim Monty	Sr
RB	3	Coley O'Brien	Sr
C	54	Mike Oriard	Jr
G	61	Jim Reilly	Jr
WR	85	Jim Seymour	Sr
WR	92	Paul Snow	Sr
QB	7	Joe Theismann	So
TE	96	Jim Winegardner	Sr
RB	32	Ed Ziegler	Jr
FB	47	Jeff Zimmerman	Jr

Defense

Pos.	#	Name	Class
LB	57	Joe Freebery	Sr
DE	82	Tom Gasseling	So
DB	46	John Gasser	Jr
LB	42	Tim Kelly	So
DT	62	Gary Kos	So
DE	75	Bob Kuechenberg	Sr
LB	47	John Lavin	Sr
DE	93	Chick Lauck	Sr
DT	77	Mike McCoy	Jr
LB	43	Tom McHale	So
DT	74	Pat Mudron	So
DL	88	Bob Neidert	So
DT	72	Eric Norri	Sr
LB	36	Bob Olson	Sr
DB	19	Thomas Quinn	Sr
DB	11	Don Reid	Jr
LB	24	Larry Schumacher	Jr
DB	16	James Sheahan	So
DB	15	John Standring	Jr
LB	49	Brian Stenger	Sr
DE	35	Ed Vuillemin	Sr
DB	14	Stephan Wack	So
DT	91	Jay Ziznweski	Jr
DB	27	Chuck Zloch	So

Special teams

Pos.	#	Name	Class
K	52	Scott Hempel	So
P	81	Jim DeArrieta	Jr

Head coach

- Ara Parseghian

Coordinators/assistant coaches

Legend

- (C) Team captain
- (S) Suspended
- (I) Ineligible
- Injured
- Redshirt
