= 1968 VMI Keydets football team =

American college football season

1968 VMI Keydets football
- Conference: Southern Conference
- Record: 1–9 (1–3 SoCon)
- Head coach: Vito Ragazzo (3rd season)
- Home stadium: Alumni Memorial Field

1968 Southern Conference football standings
	Conf.					Overall
Team	W		L		T	W		L		T
Richmond $	6	–	0	–	0	8	–	3	–	0
The Citadel	4	–	2	–	0	5	–	5	–	0
East Carolina	2	–	2	–	0	4	–	6	–	0
William & Mary	2	–	2	–	0	3	–	7	–	0
Davidson	1	–	3	–	0	3	–	6	–	0
VMI	1	–	3	–	0	1	–	9	–	0
Furman	0	–	4	–	0	1	–	9	–	0
$ – Conference champion

The 1968 VMI Keydets football team was an American football team that represented the Virginia Military Institute (VMI) as a member of the Southern Conference (SoCon) during the 1968 NCAA University Division football season ). In their third year under head coach Vito Ragazzo, the team compiled an overall record of 1–9 with a mark of 1–3 in conference play, placing sixth in the SoCon.

== Schedule ==
Date	Opponent	Site	Result	Attendance	Source
September 21	at Vanderbilt*	Dudley Field; Nashville, TN	L 12–25	17,000	
September 28	at Virginia*	Scott Stadium; Charlottesville, VA	L 0–47	24,000	
October 5	Villanova*	Alumni Memorial Stadium; Lexington, VA	L 13–19	6,000	
October 11	vs. West Virginia*	Victory Stadium; Roanoke, VA (Harvest Bowl)	L 7–14	14,000	
October 19	at The Citadel	Johnson Hagood Stadium; Charleston, SC (rivalry)	L 8–13	12,300	
October 26	William & Mary	Alumni Memorial Field; Lexington, VA (rivalry)	L 10–20	5,200	
November 2	at Richmond	City Stadium; Richmond, VA (rivalry)	L 0–35	15,000	
November 9	at Davidson	Richardson Field; Davidson, NC	W 21–17	1,200	
November 16	at Boston College*	Alumni Stadium; Chestnut Hill, MA	L 13–45	17,300	
November 28	vs. Virginia Tech*	Victory Stadium; Roanoke, VA (rivalry)	L 6–55	17,000	
*Non-conference game
