= 1968 Navy Midshipmen football team =

American college football season

1968 Navy Midshipmen football
- Conference: Independent
- Record: 2–8
- Head coach: Bill Elias (4th season)
- Captain: Mike Clark
- Home stadium: Navy–Marine Corps Memorial Stadium

1968 NCAA University Division independents football records
| | Conf. | | | Overall |
| Team | W | L | T | W | | L | | T |
|---|---|---|---|---|---|---|---|---|
| No. 2 Penn State | | – | | 11 | – | 0 | – | 0 |
| Rutgers | | – | | 8 | – | 2 | – | 0 |
| West Texas State | | – | | 8 | – | 2 | – | 0 |
| No. 5 Notre Dame | | – | | 7 | – | 2 | – | 1 |
| Florida State | | – | | 8 | – | 3 | – | 0 |
| Air Force | | – | | 7 | – | 3 | – | 0 |
| Army | | – | | 7 | – | 3 | – | 0 |
| Buffalo | | – | | 7 | – | 3 | – | 0 |
| No. 18 Houston | | – | | 6 | – | 2 | – | 2 |
| Utah State | | – | | 7 | – | 3 | – | 0 |
| Boston College | | – | | 7 | – | 3 | – | 0 |
| West Virginia | | – | | 7 | – | 3 | – | 0 |
| Virginia Tech | | – | | 7 | – | 4 | – | 0 |
| Syracuse | | – | | 6 | – | 4 | – | 0 |
| Villanova | | – | | 6 | – | 4 | – | 0 |
| Xavier | | – | | 6 | – | 4 | – | 0 |
| Colgate | | – | | 5 | – | 5 | – | 0 |
| Dayton | | – | | 5 | – | 5 | – | 0 |
| Miami (FL) | | – | | 5 | – | 5 | – | 0 |
| New Mexico State | | – | | 5 | – | 5 | – | 0 |
| Georgia Tech | | – | | 4 | – | 6 | – | 0 |
| Southern Miss | | – | | 4 | – | 6 | – | 0 |
| Holy Cross | | – | | 3 | – | 6 | – | 1 |
| San Jose State | | – | | 3 | – | 7 | – | 0 |
| Navy | | – | | 2 | – | 8 | – | 0 |
| Tulane | | – | | 2 | – | 8 | – | 0 |
| Pittsburgh | | – | | 1 | – | 9 | – | 0 |
Rankings from AP Poll

The 1968 Navy Midshipmen football team represented the United States Naval Academy (USNA) as an independent during the 1968 NCAA University Division football season. The team was led by fourth-year head coach Bill Elias.

== Schedule ==
| Date | Time | Opponent | Site | TV | Result | Attendance | Source |
|---|---|---|---|---|---|---|---|
| September 21 | | at Penn State | Beaver Stadium; University Park, PA | | L 6–31 | 49,273 | |
| September 28 | | Boston College^{†} | Navy–Marine Corps Memorial Stadium; Annapolis, MD | | L 15–49 | 23,302 | |
| October 5 | | at Michigan | Michigan Stadium; Ann Arbor, MI | | L 9–32 | 56,501 | |
| October 12 | | vs. Air Force | Soldier Field; Chicago, IL (rivalry) | | L 20–26 | 51,473 | |
| October 19 | | Pittsburgh | Navy–Marine Corps Memorial Stadium; Annapolis, MD | | W 17–16 | 16,381 | |
| October 26 | | Virginia | Navy–Marine Corps Memorial Stadium; Annapolis, MD | | L 0–24 | 26,127 | |
| November 2 | 1:30 p.m. | vs. Notre Dame | John F. Kennedy Stadium; Philadelphia, PA (rivalry) | | L 14–45 | 63,738 | |
| November 9 | | at Georgia Tech | Grant Field; Atlanta, GA | | W 35–15 | 31,624 | |
| November 16 | | at Syracuse | Archbold Stadium; Syracuse, NY | | L 6–44 | 33,785 | |
| November 30 | 1:30 p.m. | vs. Army | John F. Kennedy Stadium; Philadelphia, PA (Army–Navy Game) | ABC | L 14–21 | 102,000 | |
^{†}Homecoming; All times are in Eastern time

== Roster ==
1968 Navy Midshipmen football team roster
Players
Coaches
Offense

| Pos. | # | Name | Class |
|---|---|---|---|
| RB | 42 | Jeri Balsly | Sr |
| OL | 72 | Charles Boyer | So |
| OT | 71 | Tom Burbage | Sr |
| WR | 80 | Mike Casey | Jr |
| TE | 84 | Mike Clark | Sr |
| RB | 35 | Tom Daley | Sr |
| G | 65 | John Gantley | Sr |
| C | 58 | Jim Gierucki | Sr |
| G | 69 | Mike Hecomovich | So |
| QB | 13 | Rick Hormel | So |
| WR | 85 | Fred Jones | Sr |
| OT | 63 | Jeff Krstich | Jr |
| RB | 26 | Roland Laurenzo | Sr |
| G | 73 | Steve Leaman | Sr |
| RB | 24 | Ron Marchetti | Jr |
| QB | 15 | Mike McNallen | So |
| WR | 82 | Scott Monson | So |
| WR | 89 | Bill Newton | Sr |
| QB | 16 | Bob Pacenta | Jr |
| RB | 48 | Dan Pike | Jr |
| WR | 30 | Karl Schwelm | So |
| RB | 38 | Jim Spore | Jr |
| FB | 25 | Jeff Steelman | So |
| RB | 81 | Bob Terlecky | So |
| C | 51 | Dick Wilkes | So |
| OT | 79 | Wally Winslow | So |

Defense

| Pos. | # | Name | Class |
|---|---|---|---|
| DT | 77 | Emerson Carr | Sr |
| DT | 78 | Tom Cleverdon | Sr |
| LB | 62 | Mark Crimmins | So |
| DB | 18 | Hall Dillon | Jr |
| DB | 40 | Chip Estey | Sr |
| DL | 87 | Tom LaForce | Sr |
| DB | 49 | Jeff Lammers | So |
| DB | 18 | Joel Lassman | So |
| DE | 36 | Mike Lettieri | Sr |
| DT | 74 | Tom McKean | Sr |
| LB | 70 | Bill McKinney | So |
| DL | 76 | Bob Moosally | Jr |
| DE | 88 | Tom O'Brien | So |
| DB | 11 | Jim Sheppard | Jr |
| DB | 21 | Tom Sher | Jr |
| DB | 22 | Grant Thorpe | Jr |
| LB | 68 | Russ Wills | Sr |
| DB | 34 | Fred Ziska | So |

Special teams

| Pos. | # | Name | Class |
|---|---|---|---|
| K | 10 | Jack Detweller | Jr |

Head coach

- Bill Elias

Coordinators/assistant coaches

Legend

- (C) Team captain
- (S) Suspended
- (I) Ineligible
- Injured
- Redshirt
