= 1968 Furman Paladins football team =

American college football season

1968 Furman Paladins football
- Conference: Southern Conference
- Record: 1–9 (0–4 SoCon)
- Head coach: Bob King (11th season)
- Captain: Jimmy Jordan
- Home stadium: Sirrine Stadium

1968 Southern Conference football standings
	Conf.					Overall
Team	W		L		T	W		L		T
Richmond $	6	–	0	–	0	8	–	3	–	0
The Citadel	4	–	2	–	0	5	–	5	–	0
East Carolina	2	–	2	–	0	4	–	6	–	0
William & Mary	2	–	2	–	0	3	–	7	–	0
Davidson	1	–	3	–	0	3	–	6	–	0
VMI	1	–	3	–	0	1	–	9	–	0
Furman	0	–	4	–	0	1	–	9	–	0
$ – Conference champion

The 1968 Furman Paladins football team was an American football team that represented Furman University as a member of the Southern Conference (SoCon) during the 1968 NCAA University Division football season. In their eleventh season under head coach Bob King, Furman compiled a 1–9 record, with a mark of 0–4 in conference play, placing seventh in the SoCon.

== Schedule ==
Date	Opponent	Site	Result	Attendance	Source
September 14	at Mississippi College*	Robinson Field; Clinton, MS	L 12–21		
September 21	Presbyterian*	Sirrine Stadium; Greenville, SC	W 13–9	8,000	
September 28	at Wofford*	Snyder Field; Spartanburg, SC (rivalry)	L 7–13		
October 5	The Citadel	Sirrine Stadium; Greenville, SC (rivalry)	L 12–31	10,400	
October 19	at Richmond	City Stadium; Richmond, VA	L 0–34	3,000	
October 26	at Davidson	Richardson Stadium; Davidson, NC	L 7–28	6,200	
November 2	East Carolina	Sirrine Stadium; Greenville, SC	L 13–24	6,500	
November 9	Samford*	Sirrine Stadium; Greenville, SC	L 12–17	1,000	
November 16	at No. 5 Chattanooga*	Chamberlain Field; Chattanooga, TN	L 14–31	8,000	
November 28	Wofford*	Sirrine Stadium; Greenville, SC	L 7–21	4,000	
*Non-conference game; Rankings from AP Poll released prior to the game
