= 1968 Miami Hurricanes football team =

American college football season

1968 Miami Hurricanes football
- Conference: Independent
- Record: 5–5
- Head coach: Charlie Tate (5th season)
- MVP: Ted Hendricks
- Captains: John Acuff; Ted Hendricks; Jerry Pierce
- Home stadium: Miami Orange Bowl

1968 NCAA University Division independents football records
	Conf.			Overall
Team	W	L	T	W		L		T
No. 2 Penn State		–		11	–	0	–	0
Rutgers		–		8	–	2	–	0
West Texas State		–		8	–	2	–	0
No. 5 Notre Dame		–		7	–	2	–	1
Florida State		–		8	–	3	–	0
Air Force		–		7	–	3	–	0
Army		–		7	–	3	–	0
Buffalo		–		7	–	3	–	0
No. 18 Houston		–		6	–	2	–	2
Utah State		–		7	–	3	–	0
Boston College		–		7	–	3	–	0
West Virginia		–		7	–	3	–	0
Virginia Tech		–		7	–	4	–	0
Syracuse		–		6	–	4	–	0
Villanova		–		6	–	4	–	0
Xavier		–		6	–	4	–	0
Colgate		–		5	–	5	–	0
Dayton		–		5	–	5	–	0
Miami (FL)		–		5	–	5	–	0
New Mexico State		–		5	–	5	–	0
Georgia Tech		–		4	–	6	–	0
Southern Miss		–		4	–	6	–	0
Holy Cross		–		3	–	6	–	1
San Jose State		–		3	–	7	–	0
Navy		–		2	–	8	–	0
Tulane		–		2	–	8	–	0
Pittsburgh		–		1	–	9	–	0
Rankings from AP Poll

The 1968 Miami Hurricanes football team represented the University of Miami as an independent during the 1968 NCAA University Division football season. Led by fifth-year head coach Charlie Tate, the Hurricanes played their home games at the Miami Orange Bowl in Miami, Florida. Miami finished the season with a record of 5–5.

== Schedule ==
Date	Opponent	Rank	Site	TV	Result	Attendance	Source
September 20	Northwestern	No. 19	Miami Orange Bowl; Miami, FL		W 28–7	37,035	
September 28	at Georgia Tech	No. 15	Grant Field; Atlanta, GA		W 10–7	44,774	
October 5	at No. 2 USC	No. 13	Los Angeles Memorial Coliseum; Los Angeles, CA		L 3–28	71,189	
October 11	No. 8 LSU		Miami Orange Bowl; Miami, FL		W 30–0	39,284	
October 18	Virginia Tech	No. 12	Miami Orange Bowl; Miami, FL (rivalry)		W 13–8	36,844	
October 26	at Auburn	No. 9	Cliff Hare Stadium; Auburn, AL		L 6–31	45,000	
November 1	Pittsburgh		Miami Orange Bowl; Miami, FL		W 48–0	36,839	
November 9	at No. 4 Penn State		Beaver Stadium; University Park, PA		L 7–22	49,863	
November 16	No. 16 Alabama^{†}		Miami Orange Bowl; Miami, FL	ABC	L 6–14	43,418	
November 30	at Florida		Florida Field; Gainesville, FL (rivalry)		L 10–14	55,875	
^{†}Homecoming; Rankings from AP Poll released prior to the game

== Roster ==
1968 Miami Hurricanes football team roster
Players
Coaches
Offense

Pos.	#	Name	Class
FB		John Acuff	Sr
WR		Ray Bellamy	So
RB		Bobby Best	So
C		Don Brandy
WR	87	Dave Kalina	Jr
WR		Dieter Matthes	So
QB		David Olivo	Sr
RB		Vince Opalsky	Jr
QB		Lew Pytel	So
OT		James Schneider

Defense

Pos.	#	Name	Class
DE	83	Tony Cline	Jr
LB	89	Ted Hendricks (C)	Sr
OL	50	Mike George	Jr

Special teams

Pos.	#	Name	Class

Head coach

- Charlie Tate

Coordinators/assistant coaches

Legend

- (C) Team captain
- (S) Suspended
- (I) Ineligible
- Injured
- Redshirt
