= 1968 Villanova Wildcats football team =

American college football season

1968 Villanova Wildcats football
- Conference: Independent
- Record: 6–4
- Head coach: Jack Gregory (2nd season)
- Captains: John Sodaski; Francis Boal
- Home stadium: Villanova Stadium

1968 NCAA University Division independents football records
	Conf.			Overall
Team	W	L	T	W		L		T
No. 2 Penn State		–		11	–	0	–	0
Rutgers		–		8	–	2	–	0
West Texas State		–		8	–	2	–	0
No. 5 Notre Dame		–		7	–	2	–	1
Florida State		–		8	–	3	–	0
Air Force		–		7	–	3	–	0
Army		–		7	–	3	–	0
Buffalo		–		7	–	3	–	0
No. 18 Houston		–		6	–	2	–	2
Utah State		–		7	–	3	–	0
Boston College		–		7	–	3	–	0
West Virginia		–		7	–	3	–	0
Virginia Tech		–		7	–	4	–	0
Syracuse		–		6	–	4	–	0
Villanova		–		6	–	4	–	0
Xavier		–		6	–	4	–	0
Colgate		–		5	–	5	–	0
Dayton		–		5	–	5	–	0
Miami (FL)		–		5	–	5	–	0
New Mexico State		–		5	–	5	–	0
Georgia Tech		–		4	–	6	–	0
Southern Miss		–		4	–	6	–	0
Holy Cross		–		3	–	6	–	1
San Jose State		–		3	–	7	–	0
Navy		–		2	–	8	–	0
Tulane		–		2	–	8	–	0
Pittsburgh		–		1	–	9	–	0
Rankings from AP Poll

The 1968 Villanova Wildcats football team represented the Villanova University during the 1968 NCAA University Division football season. The head coach was Jack Gregory, coaching his second season with the Wildcats. The team played their home games at Villanova Stadium in Villanova, Pennsylvania.

== Schedule ==
Date	Opponent	Site	Result	Attendance	Source
September 21	at Toledo	Villanova Stadium; Villanova, PA	L 21–45	8,134	
September 28	Delaware	Villanova Stadium; Villanova, PA (rivalry)	W 16–0	12,025	
October 5	at VMI	Alumni Memorial Stadium; Lexington, VA	W 19–13	6,000	
October 12	at Boston College	Alumni Stadium; Chestnut Hill, MA	L 15–28	23,300	
October 19	at Buffalo	Rotary Field; Buffalo, NY	W 28–7	9,627	
October 26	Xavier	Villanova Stadium; Villanova, PA	W 21–10	12,352	
November 2	at William & Mary	Cary Field; Williamsburg, VA	L 12–33	7,000	
November 9	Quantico Marines	Villanova Stadium; Villanova, PA	W 27–13		
November 16	at West Virginia	Mountaineer Field; Morgantown, WV	L 20–30	18,000	
November 23	West Chester	Villanova Stadium; Villanova, PA	W 63–3	8,121	
