= 1968 Houston Cougars football team =

American college football season

1968 Houston Cougars football
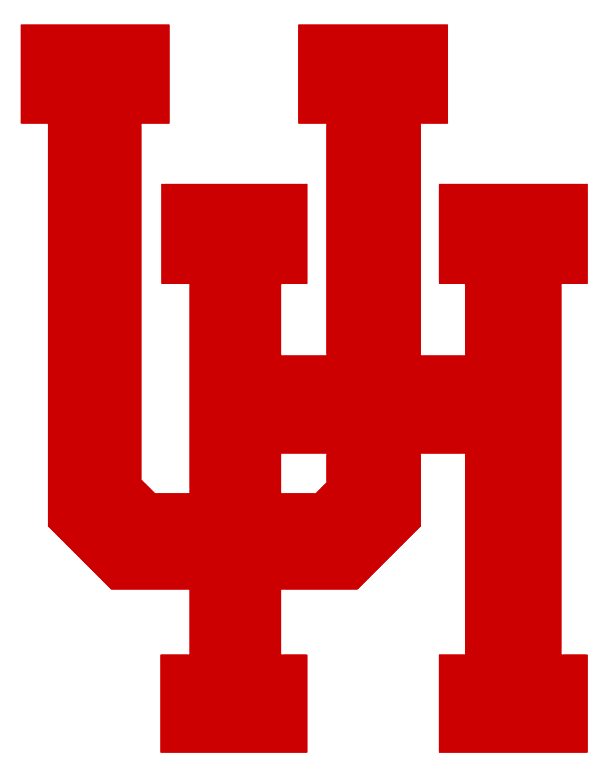
- Conference: Independent

Ranking
- Coaches: No. 20
- AP: No. 18
- Record: 6–2–2
- Head coach: Bill Yeoman (7th season)
- Offensive scheme: Houston Veer
- Defensive coordinator: Melvin Robertson (4th season)
- Captains: Jerry Gardner; Bill Cloud; Paul Gipson
- Home stadium: Houston Astrodome

1968 NCAA University Division independents football records
	Conf.			Overall
Team	W	L	T	W		L		T
No. 2 Penn State		–		11	–	0	–	0
Rutgers		–		8	–	2	–	0
West Texas State		–		8	–	2	–	0
No. 5 Notre Dame		–		7	–	2	–	1
Florida State		–		8	–	3	–	0
Air Force		–		7	–	3	–	0
Army		–		7	–	3	–	0
Buffalo		–		7	–	3	–	0
No. 18 Houston		–		6	–	2	–	2
Utah State		–		7	–	3	–	0
Boston College		–		7	–	3	–	0
West Virginia		–		7	–	3	–	0
Virginia Tech		–		7	–	4	–	0
Syracuse		–		6	–	4	–	0
Villanova		–		6	–	4	–	0
Xavier		–		6	–	4	–	0
Colgate		–		5	–	5	–	0
Dayton		–		5	–	5	–	0
Miami (FL)		–		5	–	5	–	0
New Mexico State		–		5	–	5	–	0
Georgia Tech		–		4	–	6	–	0
Southern Miss		–		4	–	6	–	0
Holy Cross		–		3	–	6	–	1
San Jose State		–		3	–	7	–	0
Navy		–		2	–	8	–	0
Tulane		–		2	–	8	–	0
Pittsburgh		–		1	–	9	–	0
Rankings from AP Poll

The 1968 Houston Cougars football team, also known as the Houston Cougars, Houston, or UH, represented the University of Houston in the 1968 NCAA University Division football season. It was the 23rd year of season play for Houston. The team was coached by seventh-year head coach Bill Yeoman who was inducted into the College Football Hall of Fame in 2001. The team played its home games in the Houston Astrodome, a 53,000-person capacity stadium off-campus in Houston. Houston competed as a member of the NCAA in the University Division, independent of any athletic conference. It was their ninth year of doing so. At this time, Houston was on probation from the NCAA, and therefore was not eligible to compete in any post-season bowl games. Following the overall season, several players were selected for the 1969 NFL/AFL draft.

The 100 points scored by Houston in the November 23rd game against Tulsa remains the most points scored by a team in Division I-FBS college football history.

== Schedule ==
Date	Opponent	Rank	Site	Result	Attendance	Source
September 14	Tulane		Houston Astrodome; Houston, TX	W 54–7	36,415	
September 21	at No. 4 Texas	No. 11	Memorial Stadium; Austin, TX	T 20–20	66,397	
October 4	Cincinnati	No. 12	Houston Astrodome; Houston, TX	W 71–33	31,881	
October 12	Oklahoma State	No. 11	Houston Astrodome; Houston, TX	L 17–21	41,889	
October 26	at No. 17 Ole Miss		Mississippi Veterans Memorial Stadium; Jackson, MS	W 29–7	32,157	
November 2	at No. 7 Georgia	No. 15	Sanford Stadium; Athens, GA	T 10–10	59,381	
November 9	at Memphis State	No. 13	Memphis Memorial Stadium; Memphis, TN	W 27–7	35,592	
November 16	Idaho	No. 14	Houston Astrodome; Houston, TX	W 77–3	30,412	
November 23	Tulsa^{†}	No. 11	Houston Astrodome; Houston, TX	W 100–6	34,098	
November 29	vs. Florida State	No. 10	Gator Bowl Stadium; Jacksonville, FL	L 20–40	39,400	
^{†}Homecoming; Rankings from AP Poll released prior to the game

== Poll rankings ==
Week-to-week rankings Legend: ██ Increase in ranking. ██ Decrease in ranking. ██ Not ranked the previous week.
Poll	Pre	Wk 1	Wk 2	Wk 3	Wk 4	Wk 5	Wk 6	Wk 7	Wk 8	Wk 9	Wk 10	Wk 11	Wk 12	Final
AP	RV	11	10	12	11	NR	NR	15	13	14	11	10	18	18
