= 1968 Davidson Wildcats football team =

American college football season

1968 Davidson Wildcats football
- Conference: Southern Conference
- Record: 3–6 (1–3 SoCon)
- Head coach: Homer Smith (4th season)
- Home stadium: Richardson Stadium

1968 Southern Conference football standings
	Conf.					Overall
Team	W		L		T	W		L		T
Richmond $	6	–	0	–	0	8	–	3	–	0
The Citadel	4	–	2	–	0	5	–	5	–	0
East Carolina	2	–	2	–	0	4	–	6	–	0
William & Mary	2	–	2	–	0	3	–	7	–	0
Davidson	1	–	3	–	0	3	–	6	–	0
VMI	1	–	3	–	0	1	–	9	–	0
Furman	0	–	4	–	0	1	–	9	–	0
$ – Conference champion

The 1968 Davidson Wildcats football team represented Davidson College as a member of the Southern Conference (SoCon) during the 1968 NCAA University Division football season. Led by fourth-year head coach Homer Smith, the Wildcats compiled an overall record of 3–6 with a mark of 1–3 in conference play, tying for fifth place in the SoCon.

== Schedule ==
Date	Opponent	Site	Result	Attendance	Source
September 21	at Bucknell*	Memorial Stadium; Lewisburg, PA	L 13–22	5,700	
September 28	at Richmond	City Stadium; Richmond, VA	L 14–24		
October 5	at Virginia*	Scott Stadium; Charlottesville, VA	L 14–41	16,500	
October 12	Connecticut*	Richardson Stadium; Davidson, NC	W 30–18	7,500	
October 26	Furman	Richardson Stadium; Davidson, NC	W 28–7	6,200	
November 2	vs. The Citadel	American Legion Memorial Stadium; Charlotte, NC	L 21–28	6,626	
November 9	VMI	Richardson Stadium; Davidson, NC	L 17–21	1,200	
November 16	at Wofford*	Snyder Field; Spartanburg, SC	W 24–9	5,000	
November 22	vs. Vanderbilt*	American Legion Memorial Stadium; Charlotte, NC	L 20–53	4,000	
*Non-conference game
