= 1968 East Carolina Pirates football team =

American college football season

1968 East Carolina Pirates football
- Conference: Southern Conference
- Record: 4–6 (2–2 SoCon)
- Head coach: Clarence Stasavich (7th season)
- Home stadium: Ficklen Memorial Stadium

1968 Southern Conference football standings
| | Conf. | | | | | Overall |
| Team | W | | L | | T | W | | L | | T |
|---|---|---|---|---|---|---|---|---|---|---|
| Richmond $ | 6 | – | 0 | – | 0 | 8 | – | 3 | – | 0 |
| The Citadel | 4 | – | 2 | – | 0 | 5 | – | 5 | – | 0 |
| East Carolina | 2 | – | 2 | – | 0 | 4 | – | 6 | – | 0 |
| William & Mary | 2 | – | 2 | – | 0 | 3 | – | 7 | – | 0 |
| Davidson | 1 | – | 3 | – | 0 | 3 | – | 6 | – | 0 |
| VMI | 1 | – | 3 | – | 0 | 1 | – | 9 | – | 0 |
| Furman | 0 | – | 4 | – | 0 | 1 | – | 9 | – | 0 |
$ – Conference champion

The 1968 East Carolina Pirates football team was an American football team that represented East Carolina University as a member of the Southern Conference during the 1968 NCAA University Division football season. In their seventh season under head coach Clarence Stasavich, the team compiled a 4–6 record.

== Schedule ==
| Date | Opponent | Site | Result | Attendance | Source |
|---|---|---|---|---|---|
| September 14 | Parsons* | Ficklen Memorial Stadium; Greenville, NC | W 37–7 | 16,687 | |
| September 21 | William & Mary | Ficklen Memorial Stadium; Greenville, NC | L 0–14 | 14,500 | |
| September 28 | at Louisiana Tech* | Louisiana Tech Stadium; Ruston, LA | L 7–35 | 12,000 | |
| October 5 | at Southern Miss* | Faulkner Field; Hattiesburg, MS | L 0–65 | 12,500 | |
| October 26 | Richmond | Ficklen Memorial Stadium; Greenville, NC | L 7–31 | 12,500 | |
| November 2 | at Furman | Sirrine Stadium; Greenville, SC | W 24–13 | 6,500 | |
| November 9 | Tampa* | Ficklen Memorial Stadium; Greenville, NC | L 21–28 | 15,000 | |
| November 16 | Marshall* | Ficklen Memorial Stadium; Greenville, NC (rivalry) | W 49–20 | 7,500 | |
| November 23 | at The Citadel | Johnson Hagood Stadium; Charleston, SC | W 24–13 | 6,500 | |
| November 30 | at East Tennessee State* | University Field; Johnson City, TN | L 7–17 | 2,000 | |
*Non-conference game
