= 1968 William & Mary Indians football team =

American college football season

1968 William & Mary Indians football
- Conference: Southern Conference
- Record: 3–7 (2–2 SoCon)
- Head coach: Marv Levy (5th season)
- Captains: Jim Barton; Burt Waite
- Home stadium: Cary Field

1968 Southern Conference football standings
	Conf.					Overall
Team	W		L		T	W		L		T
Richmond $	6	–	0	–	0	8	–	3	–	0
The Citadel	4	–	2	–	0	5	–	5	–	0
East Carolina	2	–	2	–	0	4	–	6	–	0
William & Mary	2	–	2	–	0	3	–	7	–	0
Davidson	1	–	3	–	0	3	–	6	–	0
VMI	1	–	3	–	0	1	–	9	–	0
Furman	0	–	4	–	0	1	–	9	–	0
$ – Conference champion

The 1968 William & Mary Indians football team was an American football team that represented the College of William & Mary as a member of the Southern Conference (SoCon) during the 1968 NCAA University Division football season. In their fifth season under head coach Marv Levy, William & Mary compiled a 3–7 record, with a mark of 2–2 in conference play, placing tied for third in the SoCon.

== Schedule ==
Date	Opponent	Site	Result	Attendance	Source
September 21	at East Carolina	Ficklen Memorial Stadium; Greenville, NC	W 14–0	14,505	
September 28	Virginia Tech*	Cary Field; Williamsburg, VA	L 0–12	15,000	
October 5	at Pittsburgh*	Pitt Stadium; Pittsburgh, PA	L 3–14	17,116	
October 12	Ohio*	Cary Field; Williamsburg, VA	L 0–41	12,500	
October 19	vs. West Virginia*	City Stadium; Richmond, VA (Tobacco Bowl)	L 0–20	15,500	
October 26	at VMI	Alumni Memorial Field; Lexington, VA (rivalry)	W 20–10	5,200	
November 2	Villanova*	Cary Field; Williamsburg, VA	W 33–12	7,000	
November 9	at Syracuse*	Archbold Stadium; Syracuse, NY	L 0–31	22,889	
November 16	The Citadel	Cary Field; Williamsburg, VA	L 21–24	7,500	
November 23	at Richmond	City Stadium; Richmond, VA (rivalry)	L 6–31	12,000	
*Non-conference game
