= 1968 Florida State Seminoles football team =

American college football season

1968 Florida State Seminoles football

Peach Bowl, L 27–31 vs. LSU
- Conference: Independent

Ranking
- Coaches: No. 14
- Record: 8–3
- Head coach: Bill Peterson (9th season)
- Offensive scheme: Pro set
- Defensive coordinator: Bob Harbison (3rd season)
- Base defense: 4–3
- Captain: Game captains
- Home stadium: Doak Campbell Stadium

1968 NCAA University Division independents football records
	Conf.			Overall
Team	W	L	T	W		L		T
No. 2 Penn State		–		11	–	0	–	0
Rutgers		–		8	–	2	–	0
West Texas State		–		8	–	2	–	0
No. 5 Notre Dame		–		7	–	2	–	1
Florida State		–		8	–	3	–	0
Air Force		–		7	–	3	–	0
Army		–		7	–	3	–	0
Buffalo		–		7	–	3	–	0
No. 18 Houston		–		6	–	2	–	2
Utah State		–		7	–	3	–	0
Boston College		–		7	–	3	–	0
West Virginia		–		7	–	3	–	0
Virginia Tech		–		7	–	4	–	0
Syracuse		–		6	–	4	–	0
Villanova		–		6	–	4	–	0
Xavier		–		6	–	4	–	0
Colgate		–		5	–	5	–	0
Dayton		–		5	–	5	–	0
Miami (FL)		–		5	–	5	–	0
New Mexico State		–		5	–	5	–	0
Georgia Tech		–		4	–	6	–	0
Southern Miss		–		4	–	6	–	0
Holy Cross		–		3	–	6	–	1
San Jose State		–		3	–	7	–	0
Navy		–		2	–	8	–	0
Tulane		–		2	–	8	–	0
Pittsburgh		–		1	–	9	–	0
Rankings from AP Poll

The 1968 Florida State Seminoles football team represented Florida State University as an independent during the 1968 NCAA University Division football season. This was Bill Peterson's ninth year as head coach, and he led the team to an 8–3 record.

== Schedule ==
Date	Opponent	Rank	Site	Result	Attendance	Source
September 21	at Maryland		Byrd Stadium; College Park, MD	W 24–14	33,600	
September 28	No. 5 Florida		Doak Campbell Stadium; Tallahassee, FL (rivalry)	L 3–9	45,256	
October 5	No. 17 Texas A&M		Doak Campbell Stadium; Tallahassee, FL	W 20–14	35,494	
October 19	Memphis State		Doak Campbell Stadium; Tallahassee, FL	W 20–10	30,182	
October 26	at South Carolina	No. 20	Carolina Stadium; Columbia, SC	W 35–28	42,038	
November 2	Virginia Tech	No. 18	Doak Campbell Stadium; Tallahassee, FL	L 22–40	31,342	
November 9	at Mississippi State		Scott Field; Starkville, MS	W 27–14	17,000	
November 16	at NC State		Carter Stadium; Raleigh, NC	W 48–7	26,800	
November 23	Wake Forest		Doak Campbell Stadium; Tallahassee, FL	W 42–24	35,108	
November 29	vs. No. 10 Houston		Gator Bowl Stadium; Jacksonville, FL	W 40–20	39,400	
December 30	vs. LSU	No. 19	Grant Field; Atlanta, GA (Peach Bowl)	L 27–31	35,545	
Rankings from AP Poll released prior to the game

== Game summaries ==
=== Wake Forest ===
- Bill Cappleman 22/33, 365 Yds (set school single season passing yards and attempts records)
- Ron Sellers 14 Rec, 260 Yds (set NCAA career receiving yards record and school records for TD receptions in a game, TD receptions in a career and points in a career)

== Roster ==
1968 Florida State Seminoles football team roster
Players
Coaches
Offense

Pos.	#	Name	Class
QB	14	Bill Cappleman	Jr
OT	77	Jeff Curchin	Jr
C	62	Jon Harrison	Fr
TE	84	Chip Glass	Sr
WR	34	Ron Sellers	Sr

Defense

Pos.	#	Name	Class
LB	50	Dale McCullers	Sr
DB	43	Hal Montgomery	Sr

Special teams

Pos.	#	Name	Class
P	40	Duane Carrell	So
PK	33	Grant Guthrie	Jr

Head coach

- Bill Peterson

Coordinators/assistant coaches

- Joe Gibbs
  (Offensive line)
- Joe Avezzano
  (Graduate assistant)
- Joe Perella
  (Graduate assistant)
- Junior Wren
  (Graduate assistant)

Legend

- (C) Team captain
- (S) Suspended
- (I) Ineligible
- Injured
- Redshirt
