= 1968 Utah State Aggies football team =

American college football season

1968 Utah State Aggies football
- Conference: Independent
- Record: 7–3
- Head coach: Chuck Mills (2nd season)
- Home stadium: Romney Stadium

1968 NCAA University Division independents football records
	Conf.			Overall
Team	W	L	T	W		L		T
No. 2 Penn State		–		11	–	0	–	0
Rutgers		–		8	–	2	–	0
West Texas State		–		8	–	2	–	0
No. 5 Notre Dame		–		7	–	2	–	1
Florida State		–		8	–	3	–	0
Air Force		–		7	–	3	–	0
Army		–		7	–	3	–	0
Buffalo		–		7	–	3	–	0
No. 18 Houston		–		6	–	2	–	2
Utah State		–		7	–	3	–	0
Boston College		–		7	–	3	–	0
West Virginia		–		7	–	3	–	0
Virginia Tech		–		7	–	4	–	0
Syracuse		–		6	–	4	–	0
Villanova		–		6	–	4	–	0
Xavier		–		6	–	4	–	0
Colgate		–		5	–	5	–	0
Dayton		–		5	–	5	–	0
Miami (FL)		–		5	–	5	–	0
New Mexico State		–		5	–	5	–	0
Georgia Tech		–		4	–	6	–	0
Southern Miss		–		4	–	6	–	0
Holy Cross		–		3	–	6	–	1
San Jose State		–		3	–	7	–	0
Navy		–		2	–	8	–	0
Tulane		–		2	–	8	–	0
Pittsburgh		–		1	–	9	–	0
Rankings from AP Poll

The 1968 Utah State Aggies football team was an American football team that represented Utah State University as an independent during the 1968 NCAA University Division football season. In their second season under head coach Chuck Mills, the Aggies compiled a 7–3 record and outscored all opponents by a total of 247 to 142.

The team's statistical leaders included John Pappas with 1,647 passing yards, Altie Taylor with 929 rushing yards and 72 points scored, Mike O'Shea with 1,077 receiving yards, and Dana Schulz with 131 total tackles.

== Schedule ==
Date	Opponent	Site	Result	Attendance	Source
September 14	New Mexico State	Romney Stadium; Logan, UT	W 28–12	9,217	
September 21	at Wyoming	War Memorial Stadium; Laramie, WY (rivalry)	L 3–48	20,719	
September 28	Wichita State	Romney Stadium; Logan, UT	W 38–0	10,324	
October 5	at Montana	Dornblaser Field; Missoula, MT	W 50–3	11,000	
October 12	at Wisconsin	Camp Randall Stadium; Madison, WI	W 20–0	37,469	
October 19	at Pacific (CA)	Pacific Memorial Stadium; Stockton, CA	L 7–18	10,000	
October 26	West Texas State	Romney Stadium; Logan, UT	W 20–10	14,367	
November 9	at BYU	BYU Stadium; Provo, UT (rivalry)	W 34–8	20,740	
November 23	Utah	Romney Stadium; Logan, UT (rivalry)	W 28–13	17,660	
November 30	at San Diego State	San Diego Stadium; San Diego, CA	L 19–30	37,425	
