= 1968 The Citadel Bulldogs football team =

American college football season

1968 The Citadel Bulldogs football
- Conference: Southern Conference
- Record: 5–5 (4–2 SoCon)
- Head coach: Red Parker (3rd season)
- Home stadium: Johnson Hagood Stadium

1968 Southern Conference football standings
	Conf.					Overall
Team	W		L		T	W		L		T
Richmond $	6	–	0	–	0	8	–	3	–	0
The Citadel	4	–	2	–	0	5	–	5	–	0
East Carolina	2	–	2	–	0	4	–	6	–	0
William & Mary	2	–	2	–	0	3	–	7	–	0
Davidson	1	–	3	–	0	3	–	6	–	0
VMI	1	–	3	–	0	1	–	9	–	0
Furman	0	–	4	–	0	1	–	9	–	0
$ – Conference champion

The 1968 The Citadel Bulldogs football team represented The Citadel, The Military College of South Carolina in the 1968 NCAA University Division football season. Red Parker served as head coach for the third season. The Bulldogs played as members of the Southern Conference and played home games at Johnson Hagood Stadium.

== Schedule ==
Date	Time	Opponent	Site	Result	Attendance	Source
September 21	2:00 p.m.	at Army*	Mitchie Stadium; West Point, NY	L 14–34	23,000–25,000	
September 28		Lehigh*	Johnson Hagood Stadium; Charleston, SC	W 28–12	15,400–15,450	
October 5		at Furman	Sirrine Stadium; Greenville, SC (rivalry)	W 31–12	10,400	
October 12		Richmond	Johnson Hagood Stadium; Charleston, SC	L 16–21		
October 19		VMI	Johnson Hagood Stadium; Charleston, SC (Military Classic of the South)	W 13–8	12,300	
October 26		at No. 5 Chattanooga*	Chamberlain Field; Chattanooga, TN	L 9–31	11,500	
November 2		vs. Davidson	American Legion Memorial Stadium; Charlotte, NC	W 28–21	6,626	
November 9		West Virginia*	Johnson Hagood Stadium; Charleston, SC	L 0–17	7,150	
November 16		at William & Mary	Cary Field; Williamsburg, VA	W 24–21	7,500	
November 24		East Carolina^{†}	Johnson Hagood Stadium; Charleston, SC	L 14–23		
*Non-conference game; ^{†}Homecoming; Rankings from AP Poll released prior to the game; All times are in Eastern time

== Roster ==
1968 The Citadel Bulldogs football team roster
Players			Coaches
Offense: Pos. / # / Name / Class	Defense: Pos. / # / Name / Class; LB / / John Small / Jr	Special teams: Pos. / # / Name / Class	Head coach: Red Parker; Coordinators/assistant coaches Legend: (C) Team captain; (S) Suspended; (I) Ineligible; Injured; Redshirt
