= 1968 Syracuse Orangemen football team =

American college football season

1968 Syracuse Orangemen football
- Conference: Independent
- Record: 6–4
- Head coach: Ben Schwartzwalder (20th season)
- Captain: Anthony Kyasky
- Home stadium: Archbold Stadium

1968 NCAA University Division independents football records
	Conf.			Overall
Team	W	L	T	W		L		T
No. 2 Penn State		–		11	–	0	–	0
Rutgers		–		8	–	2	–	0
West Texas State		–		8	–	2	–	0
No. 5 Notre Dame		–		7	–	2	–	1
Florida State		–		8	–	3	–	0
Air Force		–		7	–	3	–	0
Army		–		7	–	3	–	0
Buffalo		–		7	–	3	–	0
No. 18 Houston		–		6	–	2	–	2
Utah State		–		7	–	3	–	0
Boston College		–		7	–	3	–	0
West Virginia		–		7	–	3	–	0
Virginia Tech		–		7	–	4	–	0
Syracuse		–		6	–	4	–	0
Villanova		–		6	–	4	–	0
Xavier		–		6	–	4	–	0
Colgate		–		5	–	5	–	0
Dayton		–		5	–	5	–	0
Miami (FL)		–		5	–	5	–	0
New Mexico State		–		5	–	5	–	0
Georgia Tech		–		4	–	6	–	0
Southern Miss		–		4	–	6	–	0
Holy Cross		–		3	–	6	–	1
San Jose State		–		3	–	7	–	0
Navy		–		2	–	8	–	0
Tulane		–		2	–	8	–	0
Pittsburgh		–		1	–	9	–	0
Rankings from AP Poll

The 1968 Syracuse Orangemen football team represented Syracuse University as an independent during the 1968 NCAA University Division football season. The team was led by 20th-year head coach Ben Schwartzwalder and played their home games at Archbold Stadium in Syracuse, New York. Syracuse finished with a record of 6–4 and were not invited to a bowl game.

== Schedule ==
Date	Opponent	Rank	Site	Result	Attendance	Source
September 21	at Michigan State		Spartan Stadium; East Lansing, MI	L 10–14	63,488	
September 28	Maryland		Archbold Stadium; Syracuse, NY	W 32–14	26,591	
October 5	No. 9 UCLA		Archbold Stadium; Syracuse, NY	W 20–7	37,367	
October 12	Pittsburgh	No. 15	Archbold Stadium; Syracuse, NY (rivalry)	W 50–17	32,660	
October 26	at No. 11 California	No. 10	California Memorial Stadium; Berkeley, CA	L 0–43	50,000	
November 2	at Holy Cross		Fitton Field; Worcester, MA	W 47–0	14,900	
November 9	William & Mary		Archbold Stadium; Syracuse, NY	W 31–0	22,889	
November 16	Navy		Archbold Stadium; Syracuse, NY	W 44–6	33,785	
November 23	at West Virginia		Mountaineer Field; Morgantown, WV (rivalry)	L 6–23	25,500	
December 7	at No. 3 Penn State		Beaver Stadium; University Park, PA (rivalry)	L 12–30	38,000	
Rankings from AP Poll released prior to the game

== Roster ==
1968 Syracuse Orangemen football team roster
Players
Coaches
Offense

Pos.	#	Name	Class
RB	17	Dick Bidlack	Jr
RB	46	John Bulicz	Sr
RB	43	Lee Castner	Jr
RB	49	Mike Chlebeck	So
OT	73	John Cherundolo	Jr
WR	82	Nile Evans	So
OT	78	Andrew Fusco	Jr
WR	88	Tony Gabriel	So
RB	14	John Godbolt	So
WR	84	Dennis Kleinbach	Sr
RB	16	Bill Knox	So
TE	87	Bill Maddox	Jr
TE	83	John Massis	Jr
G	65	Dave McCard	Jr
RB	39	Al Newton	So
WR	85	James O'Connell	Jr
QB	44	Rich Panczyszyn	Sr
QB	24	Paul Paolisso	Jr
G	69	Jim Pritzlaff	Jr
QB	23	Ron Trask	So
C	51	Gerry Vogt	Jr
QB	29	Randy Zur	So

Defense

Pos.	#	Name	Class
LB	59	Bob Bancroft	Jr
DT	68	Gerry Beach	Sr
S	47	Gary Bletsch	So
S	15	Cliff Ensley	Sr
DE	91	Lou Gubitosa	Jr
DB	22	Dana Harrell	So
DB	26	Tom Hermanowski	Jr
DB	45	Tony Kyasky	Sr
DE	94	Peter Pietryka	Jr
LB	50	John Protz	Jr
LB	54	Jerry Ruccio	Sr
LB	55	Rob Rust	Jr
LB	58	Bob Schoonmaker	So
LB	95	Bill Smith	Jr
LB	56	John St. Peter	So
DT	80	Art Thoms	Sr
DL	72	Ray White	So
DL	70	Steve Zegalia	Sr

Special teams

Pos.	#	Name	Class
K	3	George Jakowenko	So

Head coach

- Ben Schwartzwalder

Coordinators/assistant coaches

Legend

- (C) Team captain
- (S) Suspended
- (I) Ineligible
- Injured
- Redshirt
