= 1968 Peach Bowl =

American college football game

- 1st Peach Bowl
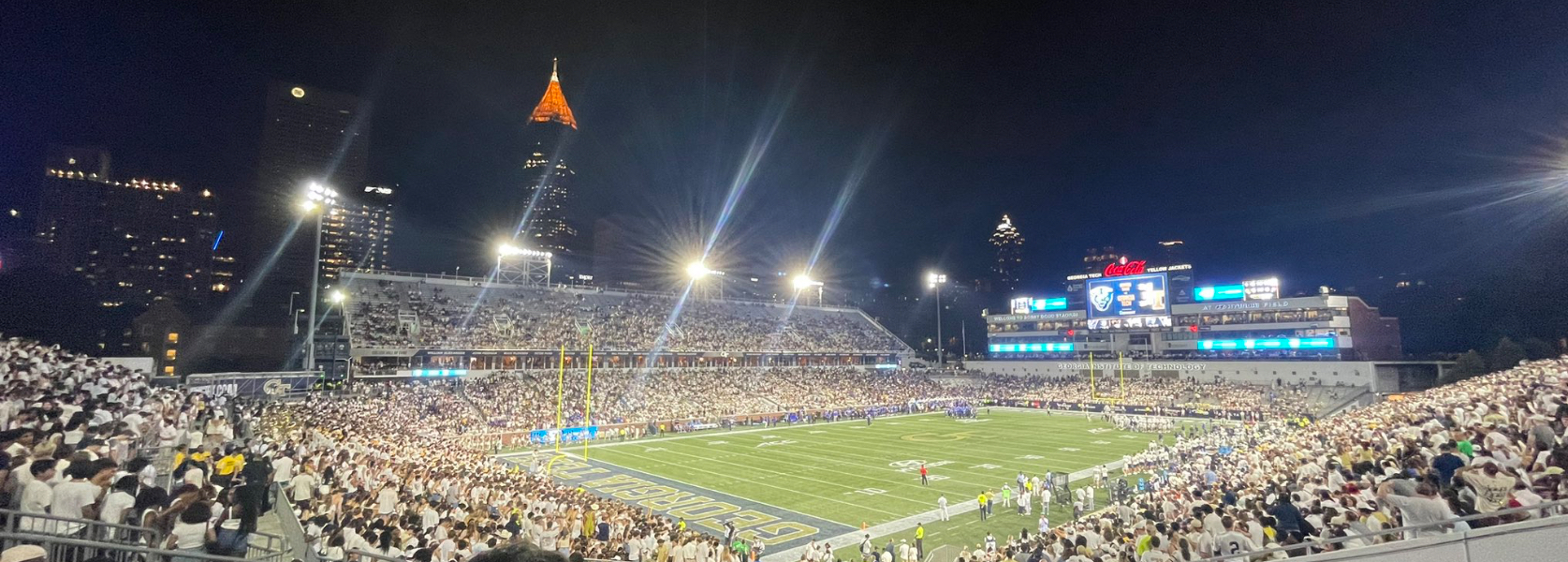
- Grant Field in Atlanta, Georgia, hosted the Peach Bowl.
LSU Tigers	Florida State Seminoles
(7–3)	(8–2)
SEC	Independent
31	27
Head coach: Charles McClendon	Head coach: Bill Peterson
	AP 19
	1	2	3	4	Total
LSU	0	10	14	7	31
Florida State	7	6	0	14	27
- Date: December 30, 1968
- Season: 1968
- Stadium: Grant Field
- Location: Atlanta
- MVP: QB Mike Hillman (LSU); DE Buddy Millican (LSU)
- Referee: Charles Bowen (SEC)
- Attendance: 35,545

United States TV coverage
- Network: SNI
- Announcers: John Ferguson, Fran Tarkenton

The 1968 Peach Bowl was a college football bowl game between the LSU Tigers and the Florida State Seminoles. It was the first Peach Bowl game ever played.

== Background ==
The game was originally created as a fund-raiser by the Lions Clubs of Georgia in 1968. The game was played in historic Grant Field for the first three games before being moved in 1971. The Tigers were ranked for nine out of the eleven games of the regular season before falling out late, reaching as high as #8 while finishing tied for 3rd in the Southeastern Conference. The Seminoles were ranked only two times the whole season, but had risen back in the polls before this game, as they tried to win a bowl game for the first time since 1965.

== Game summary ==
Four turnovers by LSU on their first four possessions had been converted by FSU into two first half touchdowns to lead 13–0 at the second quarter. But the Tigers narrowed the lead when Craig Burns returned a short punt 39 yards for a touchdown. Before the half ended, Mark Lumpkin kicked a field goal to make it 13–10 at halftime. The Tigers came alive in the second half, driving 51 yards in eight plays culminated on a Mike Hillman to Bob Hamlett for a touchdown to take the lead 17–13. On their next drive, Hillman threw another touchdown pass, this time to Bill Stober to make their lead 24–13. As the fourth quarter began, the Seminoles drove down the field 72 yards culminated with a Bill Cappleman pass to Ron Sellers touchdown to narrow the lead. On the ensuing kickoff, the Tigers fumbled the ball back to the Seminoles in Tiger territory. A few plays later the Seminoles scored again on another touchdown catch from Sellers to take a 27–24 lead with over six minutes to go. The Tigers went to work, going on a nine play, 61 yard drive (that once had a third and 19 converted) with a Maurice LeBlanc touchdown run. But the 'Noles drove down the field and were in range for a game winner when on 4th down, Barton Frye knocked down a pass intended for Sellers to make it incomplete and seal the game for the Tigers, their 4th straight bowl win.

== Aftermath ==
LSU has played in five Peach Bowls since this game, the most recent in 2019, when it defeated Oklahoma 63–28 in a College Football Playoff semifinal, while Florida State has returned twice, in 1983 and 2015.

== Statistics ==
Statistics	LSU	FSU
First downs	22	19
Yards rushing	151	92
Yards passing	233	221
Total yards	384	313
Punts-Average	4-41.5	9-34.7
Fumbles-Lost	5-4	1-0
Interceptions	1	1
Penalties-Yards	7-70	8-90
