= 1968 NCAA University Division football season =

American college football season

- Preseason AP No. 1: Purdue
- Regular season: September 21 – December 7, 1968
- Number of bowls: 10
- Bowl games: December 14, 1968 – January 1, 1969
- Champion(s): Ohio State (AP, Coaches, FWAA, NFF)
- Heisman: USC halfback O. J. Simpson

In the 1968 NCAA University Division football season, the system of "polls and bowls" changed. The Associated Press returned to its pre-1961 system of ranking the Top 20 rather than the Top 10, and voted on the national champion after the bowl games, rather than before. During the 20th century, the NCAA had no playoff for the major college football teams in the University Division, later known as Division I-A.

The NCAA Football Guide, however, did note an "unofficial national champion" based on the top ranked teams in the "wire service" (AP and UPI) polls. The "writers' poll" by Associated Press (AP) was the most popular, followed by the "coaches' poll" by United Press International) (UPI). In 1968, the UPI issued its final poll before the bowls, but the AP Trophy was withheld until the postseason was completed.

The AP poll in 1968 consisted of the votes of as many as 49 sportswriters, though not all of them voted in every poll. With a Top 20 for the first time since the 1960 season, there were more matchups between ranked teams. Those who cast votes would give their opinion of the ten best teams. Under a point system of 20 points for first place, 19 for second, etc., the "overall" ranking was determined. In 1969, there were four regular season games that matched "Top Five" teams.

== Rule changes ==
- The 1967 punting rule requiring five linemen on the kicking team to remain at the line of scrimmage until the ball is punted was repealed.
- Eliminating the "flex shift" (offensive linemen raising up then dropping back down into position, used by Kansas and UCLA the previous season and later popularized by the Dallas Cowboys) by requiring an offensive player to hold his position when he gets "on or near the ground".
- The game clock will be stopped on all first downs to move the chains, then restarted again. This rule was modified in the 2023 season to only stop the clock for first downs inside of the final two minutes of each half.
- The "tackle-eligible" pass play was declared illegal by requiring five offensive lineman numbered 50–79 to be on the line of scrimmage and declaring none of them are eligible receivers.
- Prohibiting the receiver of a fair catch who does not catch the ball to then become a blocker.
- Limiting the legal clipping zone to a rectangular point three feet by four yards on either side of the ball.
- Defensive players who intercept a pass within five yards of the end zone and his momentum takes him into the end zone, the ball will be put in play at the spot of the interception if the defensive player does not attempt to advance the ball out of the end zone.
- Length of time-outs are shortened from 120 seconds to 90 seconds.

== Conference and program changes ==
- Prior to the season, the Athletic Association of Western Universities officially renamed itself as the Pacific-8 Conference.

School	1967 Conference	1968 Conference
Boise College Broncos	junior college	NAIA Independent
Colorado State Rams	Independent	WAC
Memphis State Tigers	Independent	Missouri Valley
UTEP Miners	Independent	WAC
West Virginia Mountaineers	Southern	Independent

== September ==
In the preseason poll released on September 9, the Purdue Boilermakers were picked No. 1, followed by the defending champion USC Trojans. Third was the Notre Dame Fighting Irish, followed by the Oklahoma Sooners and the Texas Longhorns. A second poll was taken on September 16 (with Texas and Oklahoma trading places), although most teams would not begin play until the 21st.

September 21, No. 1 Purdue defeated Virginia 44–6, while No. 2 USC won 29–20 at No. 16 Minnesota. No. 3 Notre Dame defeated No. 5 Oklahoma 45–21, and No. 4 Texas tied No. 11 Houston 20–20. Purdue remained at No. 1 in the rankings, followed by No. 2 Notre Dame, No. 3 USC, No. 4 Penn State, and No. 5 Florida.

September 28 No. 1 Purdue traveled to No. 2 Notre Dame and won, 37–22. No. 3 USC won 24–7 at Northwestern, No. 4 Penn State beat Kansas State 25–9, and No. 5 Florida won at Florida State 9–3. The next poll was No. 1 Purdue, No. 2 USC, No. 3 Penn State, No. 4 Florida, and No. 5 Notre Dame.

== October ==
October 5 No. 1 Purdue won at Northwestern, 43–6, and No. 2 USC beat visiting No. 13 Miami (FL), 28–3. No. 3 Penn State won at West Virginia 31–20, No. 4 Florida beat Mississippi State 31–14, but fell from the Top Five, and No. 5 Notre Dame won at Iowa 51–28. With a 21–6 win over Oregon, No. 6 Ohio State moved up in the rankings. The next poll was No. 1 Purdue, No. 2 USC, No. 3 Penn State, No. 4 Ohio State, and No. 5 Notre Dame.

October 12 No. 1 Purdue lost 13–0 at No. 4 Ohio State, and No. 2 USC won 27–24 at No. 18 Stanford. No. 3 Penn State won at UCLA 21–6, No. 5 Notre Dame beat Northwestern 27–7, and No. 6 Kansas won 23–13 at No. 9 Nebraska. The next poll was No. 1 USC, No. 2 Ohio State, No. 3 Penn State, No. 4 Kansas, and No. 5 Purdue.

October 19 No. 1 USC beat Washington 14–7, and No. 2 Ohio State beat Northwestern 45–21. No. 3 Penn State was idle, No. 4 Kansas beat Oklahoma State 49–14, No. 5 Purdue edged Wake Forest 28–27, and No. 6 Notre Dame beat Illinois 58–8. The next poll was No. 1.USC, No. 2 Ohio State, No. 3 Kansas, No. 4 Penn State, and No. 5 Notre Dame.

October 26 No. 1 USC was idle, and No. 2 Ohio State won at Illinois 31–24. No. 3 Kansas won at Iowa State 46–25, No. 4 Penn State won at Boston College 29–0, and No. 5 Notre Dame was upset at unranked Michigan State, 21–17. No. 6 Tennessee, which had reached 4–0–1 the week before with a 10–9 win over Alabama, moved up in the rankings. The next poll was No. 1 USC, No. 2 Ohio State, No. 3 Kansas, No. 4 Penn State, and No. 5 Tennessee.

== November ==
November 2 No. 1 USC won at Oregon, 20–13, and No. 2 Ohio State beat No. 16 Michigan State 25–20. No. 3 Kansas posted its seventh win, over visiting Colorado, 27–14. No. 4 Penn State slipped past Army, 28–24 and No. 5 Tennessee beat visiting UCLA 42–18. The top five remained the same.

November 9 No. 1 USC turned back No. 11 California 35–17, and No. 2 Ohio State stayed unbeaten as well, downing Wisconsin 43–8. No. 3 Kansas, however, lost to unranked Oklahoma, 27–23. No. 4 Penn State beat visiting Miami (FL) 22–7, but No. 5 Tennessee lost to No. 18 Auburn in Birmingham, 28–14. No. 7 Michigan, riding a seven-game winning streak after losing their opener to California, won 36–0 over Illinois. No. 9 Georgia, which had been tied by Tennessee and Houston but was otherwise unbeaten, defeated Florida 51–0 in Jacksonville. The next poll was No. 1 USC, No. 2 Ohio State, No. 3 Penn State, No. 4 Michigan, and No. 5 Georgia.

November 16 No. 1 USC beat No. 13 Oregon State 17–13 and effectively clinched a Rose Bowl bid; the Beavers had been USC's only remaining rival for the Pac-8 title and this victory gave the Trojans the head-to-head advantage. No. 2 Ohio State won at unranked Iowa 33–27. No. 3 Penn State won its eighth straight at Maryland 57–13, and No. 4 Michigan beat Wisconsin 34–9. No. 5 Georgia won 17–3 at No. 12 Auburn. The top five remained the same.

November 23 No. 1 USC beat UCLA 28–16 to stay unbeaten and clinch an outright Pac-8 championship. No. 2 Ohio State, which also had an unblemished record, hosted No. 4 Michigan. In what would become a recurring pattern over the next decade, both teams were unbeaten in conference play and the game would determine who would represent the Big Ten in the Rose Bowl. Coach Woody Hayes' Buckeyes triumphed 50–14 over the Wolverines. No. 3 Penn State traveled and crushed Pittsburgh 65–9. No. 5 Georgia was idle. No. 7 Kansas finished its season with a 21–19 win at No. 13 Missouri. Kansas' only loss was to Oklahoma, their co-champions in the Big 8; the Jayhawks, who were ranked higher and had a better overall record than the Sooners, were chosen for the conference's spot in the Orange Bowl.

In the polls released on November 25, there was a disagreement between the AP writers and the UPI coaches as the AP made Ohio State its new No. 1. Though USC had more first place votes than Ohio State (24½ vs 21½), the Buckeyes were 10 points ahead overall in the AP poll (935–925). In the UPI poll of coaches, however, USC remained in first place and Ohio State second. (332–321 in total points). Both polls rounded out the top five with No. 3 Penn State, No. 4 Georgia, and No. 5 Kansas.

Also this week, Yale and Harvard (both of which were undefeated) met and ended their game in a 29–29 tie. The game was the basis of Harvard Crimson newspaper headline (and later the title of a documentary) Harvard Beats Yale 29–29.

November 30 No. 1 Ohio State and No. 5 Kansas had finished their seasons, and No. 3 Penn State was idle. No. 2 USC was tied by visiting No. 9 Notre Dame, 21–21. No. 4 Georgia closed its season unbeaten at 8–0–2, with a 47–8 win at home over Georgia Tech. As the SEC champs, the Bulldogs went to the Sugar Bowl against SWC co-champion Arkansas. No. 6 Texas finished their season with a 35–14 victory over Texas A&M. After a loss and a tie in their first two games, the Longhorns won their final eight in a row, including a 39–29 win over Arkansas. The head-to-head victory gave Texas the conference's Cotton Bowl bid against SEC runner-up Tennessee.

The AP's final regular season poll was No. 1 Ohio State, No. 2 USC, No. 3 Penn State, No. 4 Georgia, and No. 5 Texas. Ohio State had 34 of the 39 first place votes cast. Following USC's 9–0–1 finish, the UPI coaches voted unbeaten and untied (9–0) Ohio State as the national champion in their final poll on December 3. At the time, the UPI did not do a poll following the postseason bowl games, and the result would have been unaffected by the OSU and USC meeting in the Rose Bowl. The result was 28 first place votes (and 334 points) for OSU, and only 4 first place (and 277 points) for USC.

In the only significant regular season game played after the polls were taken, No. 3 Penn State remained undefeated by beating Syracuse 30–12 on December 7. The Nittany Lions prepared for a matchup against Kansas in the Orange Bowl.

== Conference standings ==
1968 Atlantic Coast Conference football standings
	Conf.					Overall
Team	W		L		T	W		L		T
NC State $	6	–	1	–	0	6	–	4	–	0
Clemson	4	–	1	–	1	4	–	5	–	1
Virginia	4	–	2	–	0	7	–	3	–	0
South Carolina	4	–	3	–	0	4	–	6	–	0
Duke	3	–	4	–	0	4	–	6	–	0
Wake Forest	2	–	3	–	1	2	–	7	–	1
Maryland	2	–	5	–	0	2	–	8	–	0
North Carolina	1	–	6	–	0	3	–	7	–	0
$ – Conference champion; Virginia's game against Navy counted in the conference standings.

1968 Big Eight Conference football standings
	Conf.					Overall
Team	W		L		T	W		L		T
No. 7 Kansas +	6	–	1	–	0	9	–	2	–	0
No. 11 Oklahoma +	6	–	1	–	0	7	–	4	–	0
No. 9 Missouri	5	–	2	–	0	8	–	3	–	0
Nebraska	3	–	4	–	0	6	–	4	–	0
Colorado	3	–	4	–	0	4	–	6	–	0
Kansas State	2	–	5	–	0	4	–	6	–	0
Oklahoma State	2	–	5	–	0	3	–	7	–	0
Iowa State	1	–	6	–	0	3	–	7	–	0
+ – Conference co-champions; Rankings from AP Poll

1968 Big Ten Conference football standings
	Conf.					Overall
Team	W		L		T	W		L		T
No. 1 Ohio State $	7	–	0	–	0	10	–	0	–	0
No. 12 Michigan	6	–	1	–	0	8	–	2	–	0
No. 10 Purdue	5	–	2	–	0	8	–	2	–	0
Minnesota	5	–	2	–	0	6	–	4	–	0
Indiana	4	–	3	–	0	6	–	4	–	0
Iowa	4	–	3	–	0	5	–	5	–	0
Michigan State	2	–	5	–	0	5	–	5	–	0
Illinois	1	–	6	–	0	1	–	9	–	0
Northwestern	1	–	6	–	0	1	–	9	–	0
Wisconsin	0	–	7	–	0	0	–	10	–	0
$ – Conference champion; Rankings from AP Poll

1968 Ivy League football standings
	Conf.					Overall
Team	W		L		T	W		L		T
Harvard +	6	–	0	–	1	8	–	0	–	1
Yale +	6	–	0	–	1	8	–	0	–	1
Penn	5	–	2	–	0	7	–	2	–	0
Princeton	4	–	3	–	0	4	–	5	–	0
Dartmouth	3	–	4	–	0	4	–	5	–	0
Columbia	2	–	5	–	0	2	–	7	–	0
Cornell	1	–	6	–	0	3	–	6	–	0
Brown	0	–	7	–	0	2	–	7	–	0
+ – Conference co-champions

1968 Mid-American Conference football standings
	Conf.					Overall
Team	W		L		T	W		L		T
No. 20 Ohio $	6	–	0	–	0	10	–	1	–	0
Miami (OH)	5	–	1	–	0	7	–	3	–	0
Bowling Green	3	–	2	–	1	6	–	3	–	1
Toledo	3	–	2	–	1	5	–	4	–	1
Western Michigan	2	–	4	–	0	3	–	6	–	0
Kent State	1	–	5	–	0	1	–	9	–	0
Marshall	0	–	6	–	0	0	–	9	–	1
$ – Conference champion; Rankings from AP Poll

1968 Missouri Valley Conference football standings
	Conf.					Overall
Team	W		L		T	W		L		T
Memphis State $	5	–	0	–	0	6	–	4	–	0
North Texas State	4	–	1	–	0	8	–	2	–	0
Cincinnati	3	–	2	–	0	5	–	4	–	1
Louisville	2	–	3	–	0	5	–	5	–	0
Tulsa	2	–	3	–	0	3	–	7	–	0
Wichita State	0	–	5	–	0	0	–	10	–	0
$ – Conference champion; Memphis State's game against Southern Miss and Cincinnati's game against Miami (OH) counted in the conference standings.

1968 Pacific-8 Conference football standings
	Conf.					Overall
Team	W		L		T	W		L		T
No. 4 USC $	6	–	0	–	0	9	–	1	–	1
No. 15 Oregon State	5	–	1	–	0	7	–	3	–	0
Stanford	3	–	3	–	1	6	–	3	–	1
California	2	–	2	–	1	7	–	3	–	1
Oregon	2	–	4	–	0	4	–	6	–	0
UCLA	2	–	4	–	0	3	–	7	–	0
Washington State	1	–	3	–	1	3	–	6	–	1
Washington	1	–	5	–	1	3	–	5	–	2
$ – Conference champion; Rankings from AP Poll

1968 Southeastern Conference football standings
	Conf.					Overall
Team	W		L		T	W		L		T
No. 8 Georgia $	5	–	0	–	1	8	–	1	–	2
No. 13 Tennessee	4	–	1	–	1	8	–	2	–	1
No. 17 Alabama	4	–	2	–	0	8	–	3	–	0
No. 19 LSU	4	–	2	–	0	8	–	3	–	0
No. 16 Auburn	4	–	2	–	0	7	–	4	–	0
Ole Miss	3	–	2	–	1	7	–	3	–	1
Florida	3	–	2	–	1	6	–	3	–	1
Vanderbilt	2	–	3	–	1	5	–	4	–	1
Mississippi State	0	–	4	–	2	0	–	8	–	2
Kentucky	0	–	7	–	0	3	–	7	–	0
$ – Conference champion; LSU, Florida, and Vanderbilt's games against Tulane; LSU's game against TCU; and Mississippi State's game against Texas Tech counted in the conference standings.; Rankings from AP Poll

1968 Southern Conference football standings
	Conf.					Overall
Team	W		L		T	W		L		T
Richmond $	6	–	0	–	0	8	–	3	–	0
The Citadel	4	–	2	–	0	5	–	5	–	0
East Carolina	2	–	2	–	0	4	–	6	–	0
William & Mary	2	–	2	–	0	3	–	7	–	0
Davidson	1	–	3	–	0	3	–	6	–	0
VMI	1	–	3	–	0	1	–	9	–	0
Furman	0	–	4	–	0	1	–	9	–	0
$ – Conference champion

1968 Southwest Conference football standings
	Conf.					Overall
Team	W		L		T	W		L		T
No. 6 Arkansas +	6	–	1	–	0	10	–	1	–	0
No. 3 Texas +	6	–	1	–	0	9	–	1	–	1
No. 14 SMU	5	–	2	–	0	8	–	3	–	0
Texas Tech	4	–	3	–	0	5	–	3	–	2
Baylor	3	–	4	–	0	3	–	7	–	0
Texas A&M	2	–	5	–	0	3	–	7	–	0
TCU	2	–	5	–	0	3	–	7	–	0
Rice	0	–	7	–	0	0	–	9	–	1
+ – Conference co-champions; Rankings from AP Poll

1968 Western Athletic Conference football standings
	Conf.					Overall
Team	W		L		T	W		L		T
Wyoming $	6	–	1	–	0	7	–	3	–	0
Arizona State	5	–	1	–	0	8	–	2	–	0
Arizona	5	–	1	–	0	8	–	3	–	0
UTEP	3	–	3	–	0	4	–	5	–	1
Utah	2	–	3	–	0	3	–	7	–	0
Colorado State	1	–	4	–	0	2	–	8	–	0
BYU	1	–	5	–	0	2	–	8	–	0
New Mexico	0	–	7	–	0	0	–	10	–	0
$ – Conference champion; Colorado State's games against Texas Tech and Air Force counted in the conference standings.

1968 NCAA University Division independents football records
	Conf.			Overall
Team	W	L	T	W		L		T
No. 2 Penn State		–		11	–	0	–	0
Rutgers		–		8	–	2	–	0
West Texas State		–		8	–	2	–	0
No. 5 Notre Dame		–		7	–	2	–	1
Florida State		–		8	–	3	–	0
Air Force		–		7	–	3	–	0
Army		–		7	–	3	–	0
Buffalo		–		7	–	3	–	0
No. 18 Houston		–		6	–	2	–	2
Utah State		–		7	–	3	–	0
Boston College		–		7	–	3	–	0
West Virginia		–		7	–	3	–	0
Virginia Tech		–		7	–	4	–	0
Syracuse		–		6	–	4	–	0
Villanova		–		6	–	4	–	0
Xavier		–		6	–	4	–	0
Colgate		–		5	–	5	–	0
Dayton		–		5	–	5	–	0
Miami (FL)		–		5	–	5	–	0
New Mexico State		–		5	–	5	–	0
Georgia Tech		–		4	–	6	–	0
Southern Miss		–		4	–	6	–	0
Holy Cross		–		3	–	6	–	1
San Jose State		–		3	–	7	–	0
Navy		–		2	–	8	–	0
Tulane		–		2	–	8	–	0
Pittsburgh		–		1	–	9	–	0
Rankings from AP Poll

== Bowl games ==
=== Major bowls ===
Wednesday, January 1, 1969

BOWL				
SUGAR	No. 9 Arkansas Razorbacks	16	No. 4 Georgia Bulldogs	2
COTTON	No. 5 Texas Longhorns	36	No. 8 Tennessee Volunteers	13
ROSE	No. 1 Ohio State Buckeyes	27	No. 2 USC Trojans	16
ORANGE	No. 3 Penn State Nittany Lions	15	No. 6 Kansas Jayhawks	14

Because No. 1 Ohio State (9–0) and No. 2 USC (9–0–1) were the champions of the Big Ten and Pac-8 conferences, respectively, they were automatically set to meet in the Rose Bowl. No. 3 Penn State (10–0) accepted an invite to the Orange Bowl. No. 6 Kansas (9–1), which shared the Big 8 crown with Oklahoma (even after losing to the Sooners) got the other bid. The Sugar Bowl featured the SEC champion against the SWC runner-up (No. 4 Georgia (8–0–2) vs. No. 9 Arkansas (9–1)) while the Cotton Bowl pitted the SWC champion against the SEC runner-up (No. 5 Texas (8–1–1) vs. No. 8 Tennessee (8–1–1))

When the sportswriters voted for the Top 20 after the bowl games, Rose Bowl winner Ohio State won the AP Trophy and the unofficial national championship, taking all but five of the 49 first place votes. Penn State, which had narrowly won the Orange Bowl, was second. The final poll was 1.Ohio State 2.Penn State 3.Texas 4.USC 5.Notre Dame 6.Arkansas 7.Kansas 8. Georgia 9.Missouri 10.Purdue 11.Oklahoma 12.Michigan 13.Tennessee 14.SMU 15.Oregon State 16.Auburn 17.Alabama 18.Houston 19.LSU and 20.Ohio University.

=== Other bowls ===
BOWL	Location	Date	Winner	Score	Runner-up
SUN	El Paso, Texas	December 28	Auburn	34–10	Arizona
GATOR	Jacksonville, Florida	December 28	No. 16 Missouri	35–10	No. 12 Alabama
TANGERINE	Orlando, Florida	December 27	Richmond	49–42	No. 15 Ohio
ASTRO-BLUEBONNET	Houston	December 31	No. 20 SMU	28–27	No. 10 Oklahoma
PEACH	Atlanta	December 30	LSU	31–27	No. 19 Florida State
LIBERTY	Memphis, Tennessee	December 14	Ole Miss	34–17	Virginia Tech

- Prior to the 1975 season, the Big Ten and Pac-8 conferences allowed only one postseason participant each, for the Rose Bowl.
- Notre Dame did not play in the postseason for 44 consecutive seasons (1925–1968).

== Heisman Trophy voting ==
The Heisman Trophy is given to the year's most outstanding player

Player	School	Position	1st	2nd	3rd	Total
O. J. Simpson	USC	RB	855	128	32	2,853
Leroy Keyes	Purdue	HB	49	358	240	1,103
Terry Hanratty	Notre Dame	QB	22	86	149	387
Ted Kwalick	Penn State	TE	14	69	74	254
Ted Hendricks	Miami (FL)	DE	7	52	49	174
Ron Johnson	Michigan	RB	12	36	50	158
Bobby Douglass	Kansas	QB	9	33	39	132
Chris Gilbert	Texas	RB	12	34	20	124
Brian Dowling	Yale	QB	15	25	24	119
Ron Sellers	Florida State	WR	7	25	20	91

== See also ==
- 1968 NCAA University Division football rankings
- 1968 NCAA College Division football season
- 1968 College Football All-America Team
