= Bob Campbell (American football) =

American football player (born 1947)

No. 23
- Position: Wide receiver

Personal information
- Born: April 18, 1947 (age 79); Johnson City, New York, U.S.
- Listed height: 6 ft 0 in (1.83 m)
- Listed weight: 195 lb (88 kg)

Career information
- High school: Vestal (Vestal, New York)
- College: Penn State
- NFL draft: 1969: 4th round, 82nd overall pick

Career history
- Pittsburgh Steelers (1969)

Career NFL statistics
- Receptions: 1
- Receiving yards: 32
- Rushing yards: 5
- Return yards: 655
- Stats at Pro Football Reference

Robert Thomas Campbell (born April 18, 1947) is an American former professional football player who was a wide receiver for one season with the Pittsburgh Steelers of the National Football League (NFL) in 1969. He played college football for the Penn State Nittany Lions and was selected by the Steelers in the fourth round (82nd pick overall) of the 1969 NFL/AFL draft.
