= Angelo Loukas =

Greek born American football player (born 1947)

No. 60, 66, 64
- Positions: Guard, Tackle

Personal information
- Born: February 25, 1947 (age 79); Corinth, Greece
- Listed height: 6 ft 3 in (1.91 m)
- Listed weight: 250 lb (113 kg)

Career information
- High school: Bowen (Chicago, Illinois, U.S.)
- College: Northwestern (1965-1968)
- NFL draft: 1969: undrafted

Career history
- Buffalo Bills (1969); Boston Patriots (1970); Hartford Knights (1971)

Awards and highlights
- Second-team All-Big Ten (1968)

Career NFL/AFL statistics
- Games played: 15
- Games started: 1
- Fumble recoveries: 1
- Stats at Pro Football Reference

Angelo Loukas (born February 25, 1947) is a Greek former professional American football guard and tackle. He played for the Buffalo Bills in 1969 and for the Boston Patriots in 1970.
