= 1968 NCAA University Division football rankings =

- Season: 1968
- Bowl season: 1968–69 bowl games
- Preseason No. 1: Purdue
- End of season champions: Ohio State

Two human polls comprised the 1968 NCAA University Division football rankings. Unlike most sports, college football's governing body, the NCAA, does not bestow a national championship, instead that title is bestowed by one or more different polling agencies. There are two main weekly polls that begin in the preseason—the AP Poll and the Coaches Poll.

== Legend ==
	Increase in ranking
	Decrease in ranking
	Not ranked previous week
	National champion
(#–#)	Win–loss record
(Italics)	Number of first place votes
т	Tied with team above or below also with this symbol

== AP Poll ==
For the 1968 season, the AP Poll returned to ranking 20 teams per week, after ranking only 10 per week from 1961 to 1967. This was also the second time (first since 1965) that the final AP Poll was conducted in January after the completion of bowl season, rather than at the end of the regular season. The final poll would continue to be conducted after bowl season from this season forward.

	Preseason Aug	Week 1 Sep 16	Week 2 Sep 23	Week 3 Sep 30	Week 4 Oct 7	Week 5 Oct 14	Week 6 Oct 21	Week 7 Oct 28	Week 8 Nov 4	Week 9 Nov 11	Week 10 Nov 18	Week 11 Nov 25	Week 12 Dec 2	Week 13 (Final) Jan	
1.	Purdue (14)	Purdue (0–0) (14)	Purdue (1–0) (25)	Purdue (2–0) (42)	Purdue (3–0) (35)	USC (4–0) (23)	USC (5–0) (21)	USC (5–0) (24)	USC (6–0) (19)	USC (7–0) (32)	USC (8–0) (27)	Ohio State (9–0) (21.5)	Ohio State (9–0) (34)	Ohio State (10–0) (44)	1.
2.	USC (10)	USC (0–0) (8)	Notre Dame (1–0) (19)	USC (2–0) (2)	USC (3–0) (1)	Ohio State (3–0) (12)	Ohio State (4–0) (15)	Ohio State (5–0) (12)	Ohio State (6–0) (14)	Ohio State (7–0) (14)	Ohio State (8–0) (7)	USC (9–0) (24.5)	USC (9–0–1) (2)	Penn State (11–0) (2)	2.
3.	Notre Dame (3)	Notre Dame (0–0) (2)	USC (1–0) (4)	Penn State (2–0) (1)	Penn State (3–0) (1)	Penn State (4–0) (3)	Kansas (5–0) (5)	Kansas (6–0) (6)	Kansas (7–0) (10)	Penn State (7–0) (1)	Penn State (8–0) (2)	Penn State (9–0) (3)	Penn State (9–0) (3)	Texas (9–1–1) (2)	3.
4.	Oklahoma	Texas (0–0) (2)	Penn State (1–0) (1)	Florida (2–0)	Ohio State (2–0)	Kansas (4–0) (4)	Penn State (4–0) (1)	Penn State (5–0) (1)	Penn State (6–0) (1)	Michigan (7–1)	Michigan (8–1)	Georgia (7–0–2) (1)	Georgia (8–0–2)	USC (9–1–1)	4.
5.	Texas (3)	Oklahoma (0–0)	Florida (1–0)	Notre Dame (1–1)	Notre Dame (2–1)	Purdue (3–1)	Notre Dame (4–1)	Tennessee (4–0–1)	Tennessee (5–0–1) (1)	Georgia (6–0–2)	Georgia (7–0–2) (1)	Kansas (9–1)	Texas (8–1–1)	Notre Dame (7–2–1)	5.
6.	Oregon State (2)	Florida (0–0)	Texas (0–0–1)	Ohio State (1–0)	Kansas (3–0)	Notre Dame (3–1)	Tennessee (4–0–1)	Purdue (5–1)	Purdue (6–1)	Missouri (7–1)	Texas (7–1–1)	Texas (7–1–1)	Kansas (9–1)	Arkansas (10–1) (1)	6.
7.	Florida (1)	Alabama (0–0) (2)	Alabama (1–0)	Nebraska (3–0)	Florida (3–0)	Florida (4–0)	Purdue (4–1)	Georgia (5–0–1)	Michigan (6–1)	Kansas (7–1)	Kansas (8–1)	Tennessee (7–1–1)	Notre Dame (7–2–1)	Kansas (9–2)	7.
8.	Penn State	Oregon State (0–0)	UCLA (1–0)	Kansas (2–0)	LSU (3–0)	Tennessee (3–0–1)	Georgia (4–0–1)	California (5–1)	Missouri (6–1)	Texas (6–1–1)	Tennessee (6–1–1)	Arkansas (9–1)	Tennessee (8–1–1)	Georgia (8–1–2)	8.
9.	Tennessee	Ohio State (0–0)	Nebraska (2–0)	UCLA (2–0)	Nebraska (3–0)	Arkansas (4–0)	Miami (FL) (4–1)	Michigan (5–1)	Georgia (5–0–2)	Notre Dame (6–2)	Arkansas (8–1)	Notre Dame (7–2)	Arkansas (9–1)	Missouri (8–3)	9.
10.	Alabama	Penn State (0–0)	Houston (1–0–1)	LSU (2–0)	Tennessee (2–0–1)	Georgia (3–0–1)	Syracuse (3–1)	Missouri (5–1)	Texas (5–1–1)	Arkansas (7–1)	Notre Dame (7–2)	Houston (6–1–2)	Oklahoma (7–3)	Purdue (8–2)	10.
11.	Ohio State	Houston (1–0)	Ohio State (0–0)	Alabama (2–0)	Houston (2–0–1)	Syracuse (3–1)	California (4–1)	Texas (4–1–1)	California (5–1–1)	Tennessee (5–1–1)	Houston (5–1–2)	Oklahoma (6–3)	Purdue (8–2)	Oklahoma (7–4)	11.
12.	Texas A&M	Tennessee (0–0–1)	Kansas (1–0)	Houston (1–0–1)	Michigan State (3–0)	Miami (FL) (3–1)	Michigan (4–1)	Notre Dame (4–2)	Notre Dame (5–2)	Auburn (6–2)	Purdue (7–2)	Purdue (8–2)	Alabama (8–2)	Michigan (8–2)	12.
13.	Indiana	Texas A&M (0–0)	Indiana (1–0)	Miami (FL) (2–0)	Ole Miss (3–0)	Nebraska (3–1)	Texas (3–1–1)	SMU (5–1)	Houston (3–1–2)	Oregon State (6–2)	Missouri (7–2)	Michigan (8–2)	Michigan (8–2)	Tennessee (8–2–1)	13.
14.	Nebraska	Nebraska (1–0)	LSU (1–0)	Arizona State (2–0)	Arkansas (3–0)	Stanford (3–1)	Missouri (4–1)	LSU (5–1)	Arkansas (6–1)	Houston (4–1–2)	Oklahoma (5–3)	Oregon State (7–3)	Oregon State (7–3)	SMU (8–3)	14.
15.	Minnesota	Indiana (0–0)	Miami (FL) (1–0)	Tennessee (1–0–1)	Syracuse (2–1)	Texas Tech (3–0–1)	Florida (4–1)	Houston (3–1–1)	Oregon State (5–2)	Purdue (6–2)	Alabama (7–2)	Alabama (7–2)	Ohio (10–0)	Oregon State (7–3)	15.
16.	UCLA	Minnesota (0–0) т	Tennessee (0–0–1)	Georgia (1–0–1)	California (3–0)	Ole Miss (3–1)	Arkansas (4–1)	Michigan State (4–2)	Ohio (7–0)	Alabama (6–2)	Oregon State (6–3)	Missouri (7–3)	Missouri (7–3)	Auburn (7–4)	16.
17.	Arizona State	UCLA (0–0) т	Minnesota (0–1)	Texas A&M (1–1)	Georgia (2–0–1)	Texas (2–1–1)	Ole Miss (4–1)	Arkansas (5–1)	Michigan State (4–3)	Ohio (8–0)	Ohio (9–0)	Ohio (10–0)	Arizona State (8–2)	Alabama (8–3)	17.
18.	LSU	Georgia (0–0–1)	Oregon State (0–1) (1)	California (2–0)	Stanford (3–0)	Michigan (3–1)	LSU (4–1)	Florida State (4–1)	Auburn (5–2)	California (5–2–1)	California (6–2–1)	Auburn (6–3)	Houston (6–2–2)	Houston (6–2–2)	18.
19.	Syracuse	Miami (FL) (0–0)	Arizona State (1–0)	Michigan State (2–0)	Florida State (2–1)	Indiana (3–1)	Texas Tech (3–0–2)	Ohio (6–0)	Wyoming (6–2)	Indiana (6–2)	Auburn (6–3)	Arizona (8–1)	Florida State (8–2)	LSU (8–3)	19.
20.	Miami (FL)	LSU (0–0)	Wyoming (1–1)	Arkansas (2–0)	Oregon State (2–1)	LSU (3–1) т; Missouri (3–1) т	Florida State (3–1)	Florida (4–1–1)	LSU (5–2)	Wyoming (6–2)	Wyoming (7–2)	Arizona State (7–2)	SMU (7–3)	Ohio (10–1)	20.
	Preseason Aug	Week 1 Sep 16	Week 2 Sep 23	Week 3 Sep 30	Week 4 Oct 7	Week 5 Oct 14	Week 6 Oct 21	Week 7 Oct 28	Week 8 Nov 4	Week 9 Nov 11	Week 10 Nov 18	Week 11 Nov 25	Week 12 Dec 2	Week 13 (Final) Jan	
		Dropped: Arizona State; Syracuse	Dropped: Georgia; Oklahoma; Texas A&M	Dropped: Indiana; Minnesota; Oregon State; Texas; Wyoming	Dropped: Alabama; Arizona State; Miami (FL); Texas A&M; UCLA	Dropped: California; Florida State; Houston; Michigan State; Oregon State	Dropped: Indiana; Nebraska; Stanford	Dropped: Miami (FL); Ole Miss; Syracuse; Texas Tech	Dropped: Florida; Florida State; SMU	Dropped: LSU; Michigan State	Dropped: Indiana	Dropped: California; Wyoming	Dropped: Arizona; Auburn	Dropped: Arizona State; Florida State	

== Final Coaches Poll ==
The final UPI Coaches Poll was released prior to the bowl games, in early December.
Ohio State received 28 of the 34 first-place votes; USC received four and Penn State two.

Ranking	Team	Conference	Bowl
1	Ohio State	Big Ten	Won Rose, 27–16
2	USC	Pac-8	Lost Rose, 16–27
3	Penn State	Independent	Won Orange, 15–14
4	Georgia	SEC	Lost Sugar, 2–16
5	Texas	Southwest	Won Cotton, 36–13
6	Kansas	Big Eight	Lost Orange, 14–15
7	Tennessee	SEC	Lost Cotton, 13–36
8	Notre Dame	Independent	none
9	Arkansas	Southwest	Won Sugar, 16–2
10	Oklahoma	Big Eight	Lost Bluebonnet, 27–28
11	Purdue	Big Ten	none
12	Alabama	SEC	Lost Gator, 10–35
13	Oregon State	Pac-8	none
14	Florida State	Independent	Lost Peach, 27–31
15	Michigan	Big Ten	none
16	SMU	Southwest	Won Bluebonnet, 28–27
17	Missouri	Big Eight	Won Gator, 35–10
18	Ohio	Mid-American	Lost Tangerine, 42–49
18	Minnesota	Big Ten	none
20	Houston	Independent	none
20	Stanford	Pac-8	none

- Notre Dame did not participate in bowl games from 1925 through 1968.
- Prior to the 1975 season, the Big Ten and Pac-8 conferences allowed only one postseason participant each, for the Rose Bowl.
- The Ivy League has prohibited its members from participating in postseason football since the league was officially formed in 1954.
