= Goodfellow Game =

Sporting event

The Goodfellow Game was an annual high school football game for the unofficial city of Detroit high school football championship. The game was played between the champions of the Detroit City League (later the Detroit Public School League) and the champions of the Detroit Parochial League (later the Detroit Catholic High School League). The Goodfellow Game was played every year from 1938 through 1967. The Goodfellow Game was played sometimes at University of Detroit Stadium, but mostly at Briggs/Tiger Stadium and part of the proceeds went to the Old Newsboys’ Goodfellow Fund of Detroit, thus the name "Goodfellow Game".

The Goodfellow Game was played in a time before Michigan had a high school state championship playoff. As a result, it was considered one of the state's most prestigious high school football games of its time.

== Series history ==
=== 1930s ===
- November 26, 1938: In the first Goodfellow Game, Catholic Central High School defeated Hamtramck High School, 19–13, before the largest crowd (30,000) ever to watch a high school football game up to that time. The victory extended Catholic Central's winning streak to 26 games. The Detroit Free Press called it "the most spectacular and certainly the most interesting high school game in Detroit's history." The game was broadcast on radio stations WXYZ, WJBK, and WMBC. The game was sponsored by the Old Newsboys' Goodfellow Fund as part of fundraising drive that raised over $170,000 to provide clothing and toys for 65,000 needy children at Christmas.
- December 2, 1939: In the second Goodfellow game, the University of Detroit High School defeated Catholic Central, 20–0, in front of a crowd of 23,120 at Briggs Stadium. U. of D.'s victory broke Catholic Central's 34-game winning streak which dated back to October 29, 1934. Catholic Central's star halfback, Tony Groth, sustained a broken leg in the second quarter when he was tackled by Tommy Dorais, the oldest son of Detroit Titans football coach, Gus Dorais.

=== 1940s ===
- November 30, 1940: The third Goodfellow Game was played at the University of Detroit Stadium. The game ended in a 6–6 tie between St. Theresa's and Cooley High School. Snow and bitterly cold weather reduced the attendance to 14,861.
- November 20, 1941: In the fourth Goodfellow Game, Cooley defeated St. Theresa's, 47–6, in front of a crowd of 30,715 at Briggs Stadium. The crowd was the largest up to that time to watch a high school football game in Michigan.
- November 26, 1942: In the fifth Goodfellow Game, Catholic Central shut out Hamtramck High School, 46 to 0, in front of a Thanksgiving morning crowd of 26,495 at Briggs Stadium. Groth scored 19 points for Catholic Central.
- November 27, 1943: In the sixth Goodfellow Game, Catholic Central defeated Cooley, 8–0, in front of a crowd of 17,500 at the University of Detroit Stadium.
- December 2, 1944: In the seventh Goodfellow Game, Mackenzie High School defeated Holy Redeemer by a 3 to 0 score on a field goal kick by Gerry Woods in the final 15 seconds. The game was played at Briggs Stadium before 30,054 spectators.
- November 24, 1945: In the eighth Goodfellow Game, Denby and Catholic Central High Schools played to a 19–19 tie before 22,142 fans at Briggs Stadium.
- November 23, 1946: In the ninth Goodfellow Game, Cooley defeated St. Anthony's High School, 21–13, in front of a record crowd of 35,201 at Briggs Stadium.
- November 22, 1947: In the 10th Goodfellow Game, Denby defeated St. Mary's of Redford High School, 14–0, in front of 28,538 spectators at Briggs Stadium. Dick Panin scored two touchdowns for Denby. The game netted $59,650 for charity.
- November 26, 1948: In the 11th Goodfellow Game, played on the Friday after Thanksgiving, Denby won its second consecutive city championship, defeating St. Mary of Redford, 28–0, in front of a record crowd of 39,004 at Briggs Stadium. Dick Panin, a triple-threat fullback, scored three touchdowns for Denby.
- November 18, 1949: In the 12th Goodfellow Game, St. Anthony High School defeated the University of Detroit High School, 19–13, at Briggs Stadium.

=== 1950s ===
- November 17, 1950: In the 13th Goodfellow Game, Redford High School defeated St. Gregory High School, 7–6, before a crowd of 30,119 at Briggs Stadium.
- November 16, 1951: In the 14th Goodfellow Game, St. Mary's of Redford defeated Western High School, 23–6, before a crowd of 29,238 at Briggs Stadium.
- November 21, 1952: In the 15th Goodfellow Game, St. Mary's of Redford defeated University of Detroit High School, 13–6, to win its second consecutive city championship before a crowd of 25,776 at Briggs Stadium.
- November 20, 1953: In the 16th Goodfellow Game, Pershing High School defeated Lourdes High School, 21–7, before 29,464 spectators at Briggs Stadium.
- November 19, 1954: In the 17th Goodfellow Game, University of Detroit High School defeated St. Mary's of Redford, 23–20, before a crowd of 30,593 at Briggs Stadium. The victory capped U-D High's first undefeated season and first Goodfellow Game win since 1939.
- November 8, 1955: In the 18th Goodfellow Game, Pershing won its second consecutive championship, defeating St. Mary's of Redford, 13 to 7, before a crowd of 29,830 at Briggs Stadium. Fred Julian, who later played for the Michigan Wolverines and the New York Titans, led Pershing with 166 rushing yards.
- November 16, 1956: In the 19th Goodfellow Game, De La Salle High School defeated Denby High School, 26–20, before a crowd of 28,343 at Briggs Stadium.
- November 22, 1957: In the 20th Goodfellow Game, St. Mary's of Redford defeated Southeastern High School, 25–6, before a crowd of 34,538 at Briggs Stadium. With the victory, St. Mary's of Redford became the first school to win three Goodfellow Games.
- November 21, 1958: In the 21st Goodfellow Game, Redford High School defeated St. Mary's of Redford, 27–7, before a crowd of 38,898 at Briggs Stadium. Ken Mike rushed for 132 yards on 25 carries for Redford High.
- November 20, 1959: In the 22nd Goodfellow Game, St. Ambrose, a small school with only 140 boys enrolled, upset the heavily favored team from Cooley High, 13–7, before a crowd of 30,062 at Briggs Stadium. Halfback Joe D'Angelo scored both touchdowns for St Ambrose.

=== 1960s ===
- November 18, 1960: In the 23rd Goodfellow Game, Denby High defeated Catholic Central, 21–18, before a crowd of 39,196 at Briggs Stadium. Quarterback Bob Schram led Denby to a comeback victory after trailing, 18–8.
- November 17, 1961: In the 24th Goodfellow Game, St. Ambrose shut out Pershing High, 20–0, before a crowd of 37,157 at Tiger Stadium (Briggs Stadium was renamed Tiger Stadium in 1961). Tom Beer, who went on to play for the Denver Broncos and New England Patriots, made "two big plays that broke Pershing's back in the second quarter."
- November 16, 1962: In the 25th Goodfellow Game, St. Ambrose won its second consecutive championship (and third in four years), defeating Cooley, 19–0, before a crowd of 37,726 at Tiger Stadium. The Detroit Free Press wrote that the victory was "an extra large plume in the hat" of St. Ambrose coach George Perles, who was considered "something of a coaching prodigy at 28." Perles later coached for the Pittsburgh Steelers and Michigan State Spartans. Perles compiled a 22-3-1 record and won two city championships in three years at St. Ambrose.
- November 22, 1963: In the 26th Goodfellow Game, played on the evening of the assassination of President John F. Kennedy, Denby High defeated Notre Dame High School, 7–0, at Tiger Stadium.
- November 19, 1964: In the 27th Goodfellow Game, St. Ambrose shut out Southeastern High, 20–0, before a crowd of 15,104 in a game played in a blizzard at Tiger Stadium. With the victory, St. Ambrose became the first school to win four Goodfellow Games (1959, 1961, 1962, and 1964).
- November 19, 1965: In the 28th Goodfellow Game, Denby High and Notre Dame High played to a 14–14 tie before a crowd of 25,435 at Tiger Stadium.
- November 19, 1966: In the 29th Goodfellow Game, St. Ambrose defeated Denby High, 33–19, in a Saturday morning game at University of Detroit Stadium.
- November 18, 1967: In the 30th and final Goodfellow Game, Divine Child High School from Dearborn defeated Denby High, 13–7, before a crowd of 12,000. Gary Danielson, who later played quarterback for 12 years in the NFL, played for the 1967 Divine Child team.

In August 1968, the Detroit Board of Education and the superintendent of Detroit's Catholic schools, and the sponsoring Old Newsboys Association announced that the Goodfellow Game would be discontinued. Sagging attendance and interest, as well as difficulties in controlling enthusiastic fans at Tiger Stadium, were cited as the reason. In its 30-year history, the Goodfellow Game raised $1.4 million for Christmas gifts for needy children. Four days after the announcement, the Detroit Red Wings announced that they would donate the proceeds from their September 28 game against the Montreal Canadiens to the Old Newsboys Association to make up for the revenue lost from the traditional high school football game.
