= 1968 Georgia Tech Yellow Jackets football team =

American college football season

1968 Georgia Tech Yellow Jackets football
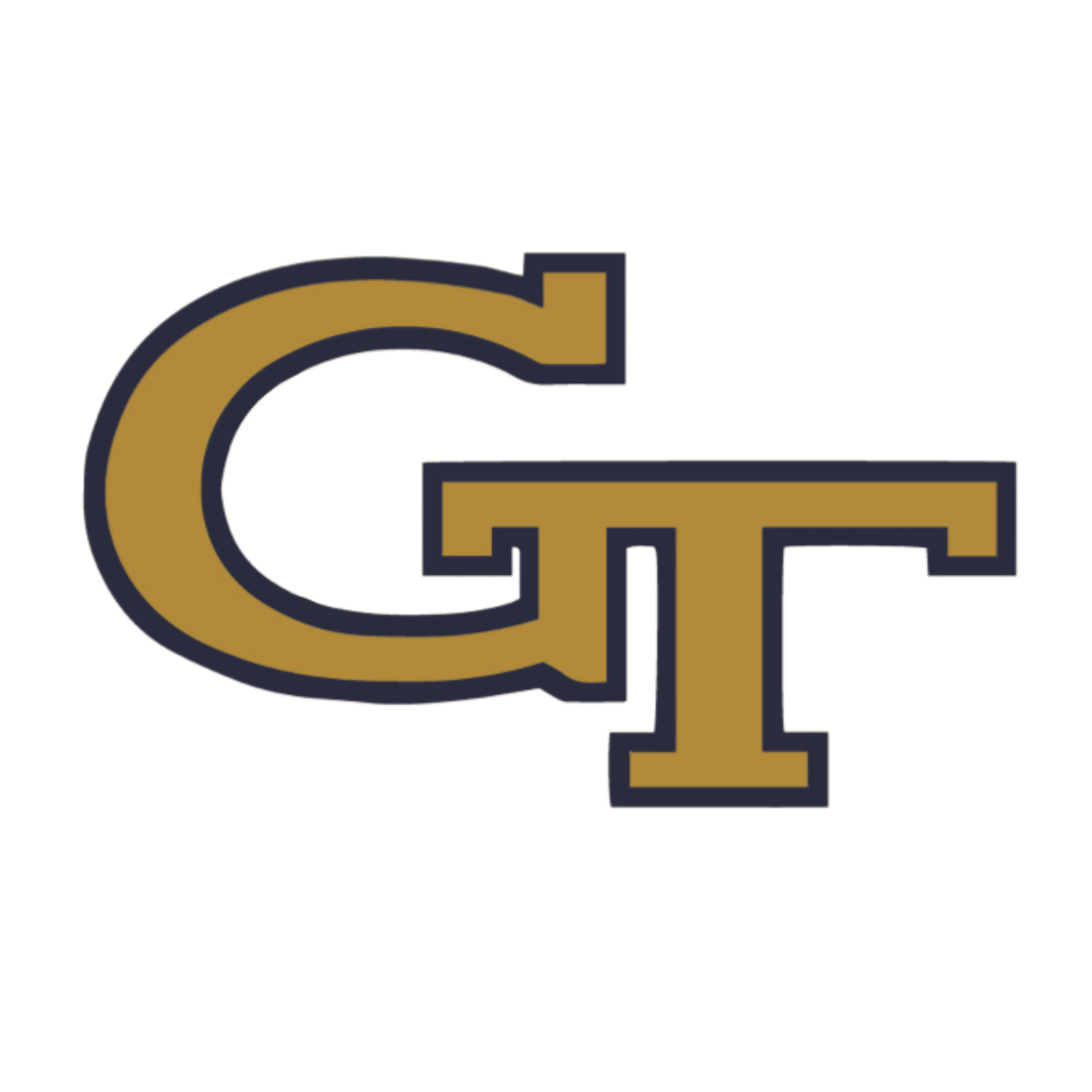
- Conference: Independent
- Record: 4–6
- Head coach: Bud Carson (2nd season)
- Offensive coordinator: Bill Crutchfield (1st season)
- Captains: Bill Kinard; Joel Stevenson
- Home stadium: Grant Field

1968 NCAA University Division independents football records
	Conf.			Overall
Team	W	L	T	W		L		T
No. 2 Penn State		–		11	–	0	–	0
Rutgers		–		8	–	2	–	0
West Texas State		–		8	–	2	–	0
No. 5 Notre Dame		–		7	–	2	–	1
Florida State		–		8	–	3	–	0
Air Force		–		7	–	3	–	0
Army		–		7	–	3	–	0
Buffalo		–		7	–	3	–	0
No. 18 Houston		–		6	–	2	–	2
Utah State		–		7	–	3	–	0
Boston College		–		7	–	3	–	0
West Virginia		–		7	–	3	–	0
Virginia Tech		–		7	–	4	–	0
Syracuse		–		6	–	4	–	0
Villanova		–		6	–	4	–	0
Xavier		–		6	–	4	–	0
Colgate		–		5	–	5	–	0
Dayton		–		5	–	5	–	0
Miami (FL)		–		5	–	5	–	0
New Mexico State		–		5	–	5	–	0
Georgia Tech		–		4	–	6	–	0
Southern Miss		–		4	–	6	–	0
Holy Cross		–		3	–	6	–	1
San Jose State		–		3	–	7	–	0
Navy		–		2	–	8	–	0
Tulane		–		2	–	8	–	0
Pittsburgh		–		1	–	9	–	0
Rankings from AP Poll

The 1968 Georgia Tech Yellow Jackets football team represented the Georgia Institute of Technology as an independent during the 1968 NCAA University Division football season. The Yellow Jackets were led by second-year head coach Bud Carson and played their home games at Grant Field in Atlanta.

== Schedule ==
Date	Opponent	Site	Result	Attendance	Source
September 21	TCU	Grant Field; Atlanta, GA	W 17–7	43,273	
September 28	No. 15 Miami (FL)	Grant Field; Atlanta, GA	L 7–10	44,774	
October 5	Clemson	Grant Field; Atlanta, GA (rivalry)	W 24–21	56,116	
October 12	No. 10 Tennessee	Grant Field; Atlanta, GA (rivalry)	L 7–24	60,011	
October 19	at Auburn	Legion Field; Birmingham, AL (rivalry)	W 21–20	47,547	
October 26	Tulane^{†}	Grant Field; Atlanta, GA	W 23–19	47,481	
November 2	at Duke	Wallace Wade Stadium; Durham, NC	L 30–46	25,000	
November 9	Navy	Grant Field; Atlanta, GA	L 15–35	31,624	
November 16	at No. 9 Notre Dame	Notre Dame Stadium; Notre Dame, IN (rivalry)	L 6–34	59,075	
November 30	at No. 4 Georgia	Sanford Stadium; Athens, GA (Clean, Old-Fashioned Hate)	L 8–47	59,537	
^{†}Homecoming; Rankings from AP Poll released prior to the game
