= 1968 Xavier Musketeers football team =

American college football season

1968 Xavier Musketeers football
- Conference: Independent
- Record: 6–4
- Head coach: Ed Biles (7th season)
- Home stadium: Xavier Stadium

1968 NCAA University Division independents football records
	Conf.			Overall
Team	W	L	T	W		L		T
No. 2 Penn State		–		11	–	0	–	0
Rutgers		–		8	–	2	–	0
West Texas State		–		8	–	2	–	0
No. 5 Notre Dame		–		7	–	2	–	1
Florida State		–		8	–	3	–	0
Air Force		–		7	–	3	–	0
Army		–		7	–	3	–	0
Buffalo		–		7	–	3	–	0
No. 18 Houston		–		6	–	2	–	2
Utah State		–		7	–	3	–	0
Boston College		–		7	–	3	–	0
West Virginia		–		7	–	3	–	0
Virginia Tech		–		7	–	4	–	0
Syracuse		–		6	–	4	–	0
Villanova		–		6	–	4	–	0
Xavier		–		6	–	4	–	0
Colgate		–		5	–	5	–	0
Dayton		–		5	–	5	–	0
Miami (FL)		–		5	–	5	–	0
New Mexico State		–		5	–	5	–	0
Georgia Tech		–		4	–	6	–	0
Southern Miss		–		4	–	6	–	0
Holy Cross		–		3	–	6	–	1
San Jose State		–		3	–	7	–	0
Navy		–		2	–	8	–	0
Tulane		–		2	–	8	–	0
Pittsburgh		–		1	–	9	–	0
Rankings from AP Poll

The 1968 Xavier Musketeers football team was an American football team that represented Xavier University as an independent during the 1968 NCAA University Division football season. In their seventh year under head coach Ed Biles, the Musketeers compiled a 6–4 record.

== Schedule ==
Date	Opponent	Site	Result	Attendance	Source
September 14	Miami (OH)	Xavier Stadium; Cincinnati, OH	L 7–28	13,681	
September 21	Quantico Marines	Xavier Stadium; Cincinnati, OH	W 28–12	10,818	
September 28	at Cincinnati	Nippert Stadium; Cincinnati, OH (rivalry)	L 14–17	21,991	
October 5	Marshall	Xavier Stadium; Cincinnati, OH	W 30–20	8,118	
October 19	at Northern Illinois	Huskie Stadium; DeKalb, IL	W 24–20	8,247	
October 26	at Villanova	Villanova Stadium; Villanova, PA	L 10–21	12,352	
November 2	Dayton	Xavier Stadium; Cincinnati, OH	W 27–25	12,181	
November 9	at Toledo	Glass Bowl; Toledo, OH	W 20–10	6,837	
November 16	at Kent State	Memorial Stadium; Kent, OH	W 23–7	5,000	
November 23	Bowling Green	Xavier Stadium; Cincinnati, OH	L 14–44	9,681	
