= 1968 New Mexico State Aggies football team =

American college football season

1968 New Mexico State Aggies football
- Conference: Independent
- Record: 5–5
- Head coach: Jim Wood (1st season)
- Home stadium: Memorial Stadium

1968 NCAA University Division independents football records
	Conf.			Overall
Team	W	L	T	W		L		T
No. 2 Penn State		–		11	–	0	–	0
Rutgers		–		8	–	2	–	0
West Texas State		–		8	–	2	–	0
No. 5 Notre Dame		–		7	–	2	–	1
Florida State		–		8	–	3	–	0
Air Force		–		7	–	3	–	0
Army		–		7	–	3	–	0
Buffalo		–		7	–	3	–	0
No. 18 Houston		–		6	–	2	–	2
Utah State		–		7	–	3	–	0
Boston College		–		7	–	3	–	0
West Virginia		–		7	–	3	–	0
Virginia Tech		–		7	–	4	–	0
Syracuse		–		6	–	4	–	0
Villanova		–		6	–	4	–	0
Xavier		–		6	–	4	–	0
Colgate		–		5	–	5	–	0
Dayton		–		5	–	5	–	0
Miami (FL)		–		5	–	5	–	0
New Mexico State		–		5	–	5	–	0
Georgia Tech		–		4	–	6	–	0
Southern Miss		–		4	–	6	–	0
Holy Cross		–		3	–	6	–	1
San Jose State		–		3	–	7	–	0
Navy		–		2	–	8	–	0
Tulane		–		2	–	8	–	0
Pittsburgh		–		1	–	9	–	0
Rankings from AP Poll

The 1968 New Mexico State Aggies football team was an American football team that represented New Mexico State University as an independent during the 1968 NCAA University Division football season. In their first year under head coach Jim Wood, the Aggies compiled a 5–5 record and were outscored by a total of 244 to 228. The team played home games at home games at Memorial Stadium in Las Cruces, New Mexico.

== Schedule ==
Date	Opponent	Site	Result	Attendance	Source
September 14	at Utah State	Romney Stadium; Logan, UT	L 12–28	9,217	
September 21	at North Texas State	Fouts Field; Denton, TX	L 20–47	9,217–9,500	
September 28	No. 6 UT Arlington	Memorial Stadium; Las Cruces, NM	W 21–20	15,338	
October 5	at Lamar Tech	Cardinal Stadium; Beaumont, TX	W 16–14	8,558	
October 19	at UTEP	Sun Bowl; El Paso, TX (rivalry)	L 14–30	25,320	
October 26	at Northern Illinois	Huskie Stadium; DeKalb, IL	W 27–13	18,339	
November 2	West Texas State^{†}	Memorial Stadium; Las Cruces, NM	L 14–23	17,000	
November 9	Wichita State	Memorial Stadium; Las Cruces, NM	W 47–21	7,300	
November 16	at New Mexico	University Stadium; Albuquerque, NM (rivalry)	W 33–6	8,800	
November 28	at Louisiana Tech	Louisiana Tech Stadium; Ruston, LA	L 24–42	5,000	
^{†}Homecoming; Rankings from AP Poll released prior to the game
