= 1968 Dayton Flyers football team =

American college football season

1968 Dayton Flyers football
- Conference: Independent
- Record: 5–5
- Head coach: John McVay (4th season)
- Home stadium: Baujan Field

1968 NCAA University Division independents football records
	Conf.			Overall
Team	W	L	T	W		L		T
No. 2 Penn State		–		11	–	0	–	0
Rutgers		–		8	–	2	–	0
West Texas State		–		8	–	2	–	0
No. 5 Notre Dame		–		7	–	2	–	1
Florida State		–		8	–	3	–	0
Air Force		–		7	–	3	–	0
Army		–		7	–	3	–	0
Buffalo		–		7	–	3	–	0
No. 18 Houston		–		6	–	2	–	2
Utah State		–		7	–	3	–	0
Boston College		–		7	–	3	–	0
West Virginia		–		7	–	3	–	0
Virginia Tech		–		7	–	4	–	0
Syracuse		–		6	–	4	–	0
Villanova		–		6	–	4	–	0
Xavier		–		6	–	4	–	0
Colgate		–		5	–	5	–	0
Dayton		–		5	–	5	–	0
Miami (FL)		–		5	–	5	–	0
New Mexico State		–		5	–	5	–	0
Georgia Tech		–		4	–	6	–	0
Southern Miss		–		4	–	6	–	0
Holy Cross		–		3	–	6	–	1
San Jose State		–		3	–	7	–	0
Navy		–		2	–	8	–	0
Tulane		–		2	–	8	–	0
Pittsburgh		–		1	–	9	–	0
Rankings from AP Poll

The 1968 Dayton Flyers football team represented the University of Dayton as an independent during the 1968 NCAA University Division football season. Led by fourth-year head coach John McVay, the Flyers compiled a record of 5–5.

== Schedule ==
Date	Opponent	Site	Result	Attendance	Source
September 14	Kent State	Baujan Field; Dayton, OH	W 24–10	13,888	
September 21	Saint Joseph's (IN)	Baujan Field; Dayton, OH	W 57–0	12,886	
September 28	at Bowling Green	Doyt Perry Stadium; Bowling Green, OH	L 14–20	14,700	
October 5	Louisville	Baujan Field; Dayton, OH	W 28–14	12,238	
October 19	Southern Illinois	Baujan Field; Dayton, OH	L 17–18	14,600–14,613	
October 26	at Ohio	Peden Stadium; Athens, OH	L 12–42	19,732	
November 2	at Xavier	Corcoran Stadium; Cincinnati, OH	L 25–27	12,181	
November 9	at Miami (OH)	Miami Field; Oxford, OH	L 0–14	11,896	
November 16	Toledo	Baujan Field; Dayton, OH	W 10–3	8,852	
November 23	at Temple	Temple Stadium; Philadelphia, PA	W 35–17	6,000	
