= 1968 Pittsburgh Panthers football team =

American college football season

1968 Pittsburgh Panthers football
- Conference: Independent
- Record: 1–9
- Head coach: Dave Hart (3rd season)
- Home stadium: Pitt Stadium

1968 NCAA University Division independents football records
	Conf.			Overall
Team	W	L	T	W		L		T
No. 2 Penn State		–		11	–	0	–	0
Rutgers		–		8	–	2	–	0
West Texas State		–		8	–	2	–	0
No. 5 Notre Dame		–		7	–	2	–	1
Florida State		–		8	–	3	–	0
Air Force		–		7	–	3	–	0
Army		–		7	–	3	–	0
Buffalo		–		7	–	3	–	0
No. 18 Houston		–		6	–	2	–	2
Utah State		–		7	–	3	–	0
Boston College		–		7	–	3	–	0
West Virginia		–		7	–	3	–	0
Virginia Tech		–		7	–	4	–	0
Syracuse		–		6	–	4	–	0
Villanova		–		6	–	4	–	0
Xavier		–		6	–	4	–	0
Colgate		–		5	–	5	–	0
Dayton		–		5	–	5	–	0
Miami (FL)		–		5	–	5	–	0
New Mexico State		–		5	–	5	–	0
Georgia Tech		–		4	–	6	–	0
Southern Miss		–		4	–	6	–	0
Holy Cross		–		3	–	6	–	1
San Jose State		–		3	–	7	–	0
Navy		–		2	–	8	–	0
Tulane		–		2	–	8	–	0
Pittsburgh		–		1	–	9	–	0
Rankings from AP Poll

The 1968 Pittsburgh Panthers football team represented the University of Pittsburgh as an independent during the 1968 NCAA University Division football season. The team compiled a 1–9 record under head coach Dave Hart. The team's statistical leaders included Dave Havern with 1,810 passing yards and Denny Ferris with 472 rushing yards.

== Schedule ==
Date	Time	Opponent	Site	Result	Attendance	Source
September 21		at No. 16 UCLA	Los Angeles Memorial Coliseum; Los Angeles, CA	L 7–63	43,218	
September 28		West Virginia	Pitt Stadium; Pittsburgh, PA (Backyard Brawl)	L 15–38	33,509	
October 5		William & Mary	Pitt Stadium; Pittsburgh, PA	W 14–3	17,116	
October 12		at No. 15 Syracuse	Archbold Stadium; Syracuse, NY (rivalry)	L 17–50	32,660	
October 19		Navy	Navy–Marine Corps Memorial Stadium; Annapolis, MD	L 16–17	16,381	
October 26		Air Force	Pitt Stadium; Pittsburgh, PA	L 14–27	29,038	
November 1		at Miami (FL)	Miami Orange Bowl; Miami, FL	L 0–48	36,839	
November 9	2:30 p.m.	at No. 12 Notre Dame	Notre Dame Stadium; Notre Dame, IN (rivalry)	L 7–56	59,075	
November 16	1:30 p.m.	Army	Pitt Stadium; Pittsburgh, PA	L 0–26	28,072	
November 23		No. 3 Penn State	Pitt Stadium; Pittsburgh, PA (rivalry)	L 9–65	31,224	
Rankings from Coaches' Poll released prior to the game

== Roster ==
1968 Pittsburgh Panthers football team roster
Players
Coaches
Offense

Pos.	#	Name	Class
G	62	Warren Allen	Jr
OT	73	Art Alois	Sr
FB	47	Jeff Brown	Jr
FB	45	Tony Esposito	So
RB	22	Denny Ferris	So
RB	25	Dave Garnett	So
QB	10	Dave Havern	So
DB	30	J. D. Lewis	So
C	56	Dave Magyar	Jr
WR	13	Joe McCain	Jr
TE	85	Doc Medich	Jr
G	67	Al Nalli	Sr
WR	80	Harry Orszulak	Sr
FB	46	Phil Sgrignoli	So
QB	14	Chuck Winters	Jr

Defense

Pos.	#	Name	Class
DB	11	Jeff Barr	Jr
LB	50	Ralph Cindrich	So
DE	86	Bob Ellis	Jr
LB	21	Charlie Hall	So
DT	68	Bruce Harkiewicz	So
DB	20	Bryant Salter	So
LB	65	Lloyd Weston	So

Special teams

Pos.	#	Name	Class

Head coach

- Dave Hart

Coordinators/assistant coaches

Legend

- (C) Team captain
- (S) Suspended
- (I) Ineligible
- Injured
- Redshirt
