= 1968 West Texas State Buffaloes football team =

American college football season

1968 West Texas State Buffaloes football
- Conference: Independent
- Record: 8–2
- Head coach: Joe Kerbel (9th season)
- Home stadium: Buffalo Bowl

1968 NCAA University Division independents football records
	Conf.			Overall
Team	W	L	T	W		L		T
No. 2 Penn State		–		11	–	0	–	0
Rutgers		–		8	–	2	–	0
West Texas State		–		8	–	2	–	0
No. 5 Notre Dame		–		7	–	2	–	1
Florida State		–		8	–	3	–	0
Air Force		–		7	–	3	–	0
Army		–		7	–	3	–	0
Buffalo		–		7	–	3	–	0
No. 18 Houston		–		6	–	2	–	2
Utah State		–		7	–	3	–	0
Boston College		–		7	–	3	–	0
West Virginia		–		7	–	3	–	0
Virginia Tech		–		7	–	4	–	0
Syracuse		–		6	–	4	–	0
Villanova		–		6	–	4	–	0
Xavier		–		6	–	4	–	0
Colgate		–		5	–	5	–	0
Dayton		–		5	–	5	–	0
Miami (FL)		–		5	–	5	–	0
New Mexico State		–		5	–	5	–	0
Georgia Tech		–		4	–	6	–	0
Southern Miss		–		4	–	6	–	0
Holy Cross		–		3	–	6	–	1
San Jose State		–		3	–	7	–	0
Navy		–		2	–	8	–	0
Tulane		–		2	–	8	–	0
Pittsburgh		–		1	–	9	–	0
Rankings from AP Poll

The 1968 West Texas State Buffaloes football team represented West Texas State University (now known as West Texas A&M University) as an independent during the 1968 NCAA University Division football season. In their ninth season under head coach Joe Kerbel, the Buffaloes compiled an 8–2 record. West Texas State played home games at the Buffalo Bowl in Canyon, Texas.

== Schedule ==
Date	Opponent	Site	Result	Attendance	Source
September 14	Lamar Tech	Buffalo Bowl; Canyon, TX	W 45–7	15,500	
September 21	Wichita State	Buffalo Bowl; Canyon, TX	W 26–0	15,100	
September 28	Pacific (CA)	Buffalo Bowl; Canyon, TX	W 23–7	14,250	
October 5	at Montana State	Gatton Field; Bozeman, MT	W 35–20	7,000	
October 12	at Memphis State	Memphis Memorial Stadium; Memphis, TN	L 21–42	25,027	
October 19	No. 12 UT Arlington	Buffalo Bowl; Canyon, TX	W 41–0	17,200	
October 26	at Utah State	Romney Stadium; Logan, UT	L 10–20	14,367	
November 2	at New Mexico State	Memorial Stadium; Las Cruces, NM	W 23–14	17,000	
November 9	Western Michigan	Buffalo Bowl; Canyon, TX	W 28–20	14,500	
November 16	at Colorado State	Hughes Stadium; Fort Collins, CO	W 22–17	7,604	
Rankings from AP Poll released prior to the game
