= 1968 Buffalo Bulls football team =

American college football season

1968 Buffalo Bulls football
- Conference: Independent
- Record: 7–3
- Head coach: Doc Urich (3rd season)
- Defensive coordinator: Rick Lantz (1st season)
- Captains: Don Sabo; Denny Mason
- Home stadium: Rotary Field, War Memorial Stadium

1968 NCAA University Division independents football records
	Conf.			Overall
Team	W	L	T	W		L		T
No. 2 Penn State		–		11	–	0	–	0
Rutgers		–		8	–	2	–	0
West Texas State		–		8	–	2	–	0
No. 5 Notre Dame		–		7	–	2	–	1
Florida State		–		8	–	3	–	0
Air Force		–		7	–	3	–	0
Army		–		7	–	3	–	0
Buffalo		–		7	–	3	–	0
No. 18 Houston		–		6	–	2	–	2
Utah State		–		7	–	3	–	0
Boston College		–		7	–	3	–	0
West Virginia		–		7	–	3	–	0
Virginia Tech		–		7	–	4	–	0
Syracuse		–		6	–	4	–	0
Villanova		–		6	–	4	–	0
Xavier		–		6	–	4	–	0
Colgate		–		5	–	5	–	0
Dayton		–		5	–	5	–	0
Miami (FL)		–		5	–	5	–	0
New Mexico State		–		5	–	5	–	0
Georgia Tech		–		4	–	6	–	0
Southern Miss		–		4	–	6	–	0
Holy Cross		–		3	–	6	–	1
San Jose State		–		3	–	7	–	0
Navy		–		2	–	8	–	0
Tulane		–		2	–	8	–	0
Pittsburgh		–		1	–	9	–	0
Rankings from AP Poll

The 1968 Buffalo Bulls football team represented the University at Buffalo as an independent during the 1968 NCAA University Division football season. Led by Doc Urich in his third and final season as head coach, the Bulls compiled a record of 7–3. The team's offense scored 195 points while the defense allowed 183 points. Buffalo played three home games at Rotary Field and one at War Memorial Stadium, both located in Buffalo, New York.

== Schedule ==
Date	Opponent	Site	Result	Attendance	Source
September 14	at Iowa State	Clyde Williams Field; Ames, IA	L 10–28	23,000	
September 21	at Kent State	Memorial Stadium; Kent, OH	W 21–13	16,488	
September 27	UMass	War Memorial Stadium; Buffalo, NY (rivalry)	W 23–0	9,434–9,493	
October 5	at Boston College	Alumni Stadium; Chestnut Hill, MA	L 12–31	19,200	
October 12	Delaware	Rotary Field; Buffalo, NY	W 29–17	7,500–8,536	
October 19	Villanova	Rotary Field; Buffalo, NY	L 7–28	9,627	
October 26	Holy Cross	Rotary Field; Buffalo, NY	W 10–9	6,207	
November 2	at Temple	Temple Stadium; Philadelphia, PA	W 50–40	6,000–6,500	
November 9	at Northern Illinois	Huskie Stadium; DeKalb, IL	W 20–7	15,153	
November 23	at Boston University	Nickerson Field; Boston, MA	W 13–10	8,000	
