= 1968 Connecticut Huskies football team =

American college football season

1968 Connecticut Huskies football

Yankee Conference co-champion
- Conference: Yankee Conference
- Record: 4–6 (4–1 Yankee)
- Head coach: John Toner (3rd season)
- Home stadium: Memorial Stadium

1968 Yankee Conference football standings
	Conf.					Overall
Team	W		L		T	W		L		T
New Hampshire +	4	–	1	–	0	6	–	2	–	0
Connecticut +	4	–	1	–	0	4	–	6	–	0
Maine	2	–	3	–	0	3	–	5	–	0
Rhode Island	2	–	3	–	0	3	–	6	–	0
UMass	2	–	3	–	0	2	–	8	–	0
Vermont	1	–	4	–	0	3	–	6	–	0
+ – Conference co-champions

The 1968 Connecticut Huskies football team represented the University of Connecticut in the 1968 NCAA College Division football season. The Huskies were led by third-year head coach John Toner, and completed the season with a record of 4–6.

== Schedule ==
Date	Opponent	Site	Result	Attendance	Source
September 21	Vermont	Memorial Stadium; Storrs, CT	W 21–0	7,819–8,000	
September 28	at Yale*	Yale Bowl; New Haven, CT	L 14–31	33,373	
October 5	at New Hampshire	Cowell Stadium; Durham, NH	L 10–17	8,500	
October 12	at Davidson*	Richardson Stadium; Davidson, NC	L 18–30	7,500	
October 19	Maine	Memorial Stadium; Storrs, CT	W 29–0	6,400–6,407	
October 26	at UMass	Alumni Stadium; Amherst, MA (rivalry)	W 27–20	17,500	
November 2	Boston University*	Memorial Stadium; Storrs, CT	L 23–33	12,053	
November 9	at Rutgers*	Rutgers Stadium; Piscataway, NJ	L 15–27	10,000	
November 16	Rhode Island	Memorial Stadium; Storrs, CT (rivalry)	W 35–6	10,500–11,384	
November 23	at Holy Cross*	Fitton Field; Worcester, MA	L 24–27	7,331	
*Non-conference game
