= 1968 Brown Bears football team =

American college football season

1968 Brown Bears football
- Conference: Ivy League
- Record: 2–7 (0–7 Ivy)
- Head coach: Len Jardine (2nd season)
- Captain: J. Rallis
- Home stadium: Brown Stadium

1968 Ivy League football standings
	Conf.					Overall
Team	W		L		T	W		L		T
Harvard +	6	–	0	–	1	8	–	0	–	1
Yale +	6	–	0	–	1	8	–	0	–	1
Penn	5	–	2	–	0	7	–	2	–	0
Princeton	4	–	3	–	0	4	–	5	–	0
Dartmouth	3	–	4	–	0	4	–	5	–	0
Columbia	2	–	5	–	0	2	–	7	–	0
Cornell	1	–	6	–	0	3	–	6	–	0
Brown	0	–	7	–	0	2	–	7	–	0
+ – Conference co-champions

The 1968 Brown Bears football team was an American football team that represented Brown University during the 1968 NCAA University Division football season. Brown finished last in the Ivy League.

In their second season under head coach Len Jardine, the Bears compiled a 2–7 record and were outscored 286 to 97. J. Rallis was the team captain.

The Bears' winless (0–7) conference record placed last in the Ivy League standings. They were outscored by Ivy opponents 258 to 60.

Brown played its home games at Brown Stadium in Providence, Rhode Island.

== Schedule ==
Date	Opponent	Site	Result	Attendance	Source
September 28	Rhode Island*	Brown Stadium; Providence, RI (rivalry)	W 10–9	11,200–13,200	
October 5	Penn	Brown Stadium; Providence, RI	L 13–17	8,400	
October 12	at Yale	Yale Bowl; New Haven, CT	L 13–35	29,511	
October 19	at Dartmouth	Memorial Field; Hanover, NH	L 0–48	8,313	
October 26	Colgate*	Brown Stadium; Providence, RI	W 27–19	9,100	
November 2	Princeton^{†}	Brown Stadium; Providence, RI	L 7–50	15,600	
November 9	Cornell	Brown Stadium; Providence, RI	L 0–31	5,000	
November 16	at Harvard	Harvard Stadium; Boston, MA	L 7–31	16,000	
November 23	at Columbia	Baker Field; New York, NY	L 20–46	9,723	
*Non-conference game; ^{†}Homecoming
