= 1968 Miami Redskins football team =

American college football season

1968 Miami Redskins football
- Conference: Mid-American Conference
- Record: 7–3 (5–1 MAC)
- Head coach: Bo Schembechler (6th season)
- MVP: Bob Babich
- Captain: Bob Babich
- Home stadium: Miami Field

1968 Mid-American Conference football standings
	Conf.					Overall
Team	W		L		T	W		L		T
No. 20 Ohio $	6	–	0	–	0	10	–	1	–	0
Miami (OH)	5	–	1	–	0	7	–	3	–	0
Bowling Green	3	–	2	–	1	6	–	3	–	1
Toledo	3	–	2	–	1	5	–	4	–	1
Western Michigan	2	–	4	–	0	3	–	6	–	0
Kent State	1	–	5	–	0	1	–	9	–	0
Marshall	0	–	6	–	0	0	–	9	–	1
$ – Conference champion; Rankings from AP Poll

The 1968 Miami Redskins football team was an American football team that represented Miami University in the Mid-American Conference (MAC) during the 1968 NCAA University Division football season. In their sixth and final season under Bo Schembechler, Miami compiled a 7–3 record (5–1 against MAC opponents), finished in second place in the MAC, and outscored all opponents by a combined total of 240 to 99.

The team's statistical leaders included quarterback Kent Thompson with 970 passing yards, halfback Cleveland Dickerson with 736 rushing yards, and end Mike Palija with 334 receiving yards. The team's defense allowed only 9.9 points per game, the best among 119 NCAA University Division football teams.

Linebacker Bob Babich was selected as a first-team All-American by the American Football Coaches Association, Time magazine, and The Sporting News. He also won the MAC and Miami most valuable player awards. Eight Miami players were selected as first-team All-MAC players: Babich, tight end Gary Arthur, defensive back Dick Boron, offensive tackle Dave Hutchins, defensive tackle Errol Kahoun, defensive end Merv Nugent, linebacker Bob Rieber, and offensive guard Larry Thompson. Babich was the team captain.

== Schedule ==
Date	Opponent	Site	Result	Attendance	Source
September 14	at Xavier*	Xavier Stadium; Cincinnati, OH	W 28–7	13,681	
September 21	at Pacific (CA)*	Pacific Memorial Stadium; Stockton, CA	L 20–21	13,500	
September 28	Western Michigan	Miami Field; Oxford, OH	W 28–0	14,112	
October 5	Kent State	Miami Field; Oxford, OH	W 24–0	14,622	
October 12	at Marshall	Fairfield Stadium; Huntington, WV	W 46–0	6,000	
October 19	at Ohio	Peden Stadium; Athens, OH (rivalry)	L 7–24	20,451	
October 26	Bowling Green	Miami Field; Oxford, OH	W 31–7	10,722	
November 2	at Toledo	Glass Bowl; Toledo, OH	W 21–17	16,276	
November 9	Dayton*	Miami Field; Oxford, OH	W 14–0	11,896	
November 23	at Cincinnati*	Nippert Stadium; Cincinnati, OH (rivalry)	L 21–23	13,028	
*Non-conference game
