= 1968 Colgate Red Raiders football team =

American college football season

1968 Colgate Red Raiders football
- Conference: Independent
- Record: 5–5
- Head coach: Neil Wheelwright (1st season)
- Captain: Gene Ditwiler
- Home stadium: Andy Kerr Stadium

1968 NCAA University Division independents football records
	Conf.			Overall
Team	W	L	T	W		L		T
No. 2 Penn State		–		11	–	0	–	0
Rutgers		–		8	–	2	–	0
West Texas State		–		8	–	2	–	0
No. 5 Notre Dame		–		7	–	2	–	1
Florida State		–		8	–	3	–	0
Air Force		–		7	–	3	–	0
Army		–		7	–	3	–	0
Buffalo		–		7	–	3	–	0
No. 18 Houston		–		6	–	2	–	2
Utah State		–		7	–	3	–	0
Boston College		–		7	–	3	–	0
West Virginia		–		7	–	3	–	0
Virginia Tech		–		7	–	4	–	0
Syracuse		–		6	–	4	–	0
Villanova		–		6	–	4	–	0
Xavier		–		6	–	4	–	0
Colgate		–		5	–	5	–	0
Dayton		–		5	–	5	–	0
Miami (FL)		–		5	–	5	–	0
New Mexico State		–		5	–	5	–	0
Georgia Tech		–		4	–	6	–	0
Southern Miss		–		4	–	6	–	0
Holy Cross		–		3	–	6	–	1
San Jose State		–		3	–	7	–	0
Navy		–		2	–	8	–	0
Tulane		–		2	–	8	–	0
Pittsburgh		–		1	–	9	–	0
Rankings from AP Poll

The 1968 Colgate Red Raiders football team was an American football team that represented Colgate University as an independent during the 1968 NCAA University Division football season. In its first season under head coach Neil Wheelwright, the team compiled a 5–5 record. Gene Ditwiler was the team captain.

The team played its home games at Andy Kerr Stadium in Hamilton, New York.

== Schedule ==
Date	Opponent	Site	Result	Attendance	Source
September 21	at Boston University	Nickerson Field; Boston, MA	W 28–0	9,000	
September 28	at Cornell	Schoellkopf Field; Ithaca, NY (rivalry)	L 0–17	18,000	
October 5	at Yale	Yale Bowl; New Haven, CT	L 14–49	29,107	
October 12	Holy Cross	Andy Kerr Stadium; Hamilton, NY	W 14–6	8,000	
October 19	at Princeton	Palmer Stadium; Princeton, NJ	W 14–7	10,000	
October 26	at Brown	Brown Stadium; Providence, RI	L 19–27	9,100	
November 2	Lehigh	Andy Kerr Stadium; Hamilton, NY	W 27–11	8,500	
November 9	at Bucknell	Memorial Stadium; Lewisburg, PA	W 48–34	8,100	
November 16	Lafayette	Andy Kerr Stadium; Hamilton, NY	L 10–14	5,500–6,000	
November 23	at Rutgers	Rutgers Stadium; Piscataway, NJ	L 0–14	16,000	

== Leading players ==
Two trophies were awarded to the Red Raiders' most valuable players in 1968:

- Ronald Burton, quarterback, received the Andy Kerr Trophy, awarded to the most valuable offensive player.
- Dick Schrumpf, linebacker, received the Hal W. Lahar Trophy, awarded to the most valuable defensive player.

Statistical leaders for the 1968 Red Raiders included:

- Rushing: Dom Fischer, 731 yards and 5 touchdowns on 173 attempts
- Passing: Ronald Burton, 702 yards, 67 completions and 3 touchdowns on 148 attempts
- Receiving: Douglas Hale, 319 yards and 1 touchdown on 30 receptions
- Total offense: Ronald Burton, 1,184 yards (702 passing, 482 rushing)
- Scoring: Gene Detwiler, 48 points from 8 touchdowns
- All-purpose yards: Dominic Fischer, 1,029 yards (731 rushing, 256 kickoff returning, 42 receiving)
