= 1968 Harvard Crimson football team =

American college football season

1968 Harvard Crimson football

Ivy League co-champion
- Conference: Ivy League
- Record: 8–0–1 (6–0–1 Ivy)
- Head coach: John Yovicsin (12th season)
- Captain: Victor E. Gatto Jr.
- Home stadium: Harvard Stadium

1968 Ivy League football standings
	Conf.					Overall
Team	W		L		T	W		L		T
Harvard +	6	–	0	–	1	8	–	0	–	1
Yale +	6	–	0	–	1	8	–	0	–	1
Penn	5	–	2	–	0	7	–	2	–	0
Princeton	4	–	3	–	0	4	–	5	–	0
Dartmouth	3	–	4	–	0	4	–	5	–	0
Columbia	2	–	5	–	0	2	–	7	–	0
Cornell	1	–	6	–	0	3	–	6	–	0
Brown	0	–	7	–	0	2	–	7	–	0
+ – Conference co-champions

The 1968 Harvard Crimson football team was an American football team that represented Harvard University during the 1968 NCAA University Division football season. Harvard was co-champion of the Ivy League.

In their 12th year under head coach John Yovicsin, the Crimson compiled an 8–0–1 record and outscored opponents 236 to 90. Vic Gatto was the team captain.

Both Harvard and Yale were unbeaten entering their season-ending rivalry matchup. Their 29–29 tie resulted in identical 6–0–1 conference records, and in both teams being named co-champions of the league. The Crimson outscored Ivy opponents 150 to 70. The final game inspired the famous headline "Harvard Beats Yale 29-29" printed in The Harvard Crimson, and a 2008 documentary film of the same name.

Harvard played its home games at Harvard Stadium in the Allston neighborhood of Boston, Massachusetts.

Actor Tommy Lee Jones was a starting guard on the team.

== Schedule ==
Date	Opponent	Site	Result	Attendance	Source
September 28	Holy Cross*	Harvard Stadium; Boston, MA	W 27–20	23,000	
October 5	Bucknell*	Harvard Stadium; Boston, MA	W 59–0	12,000	
October 12	at Columbia	Baker Field; New York, NY	W 21–14	17,182	
October 19	Cornell	Harvard Stadium; Boston, MA	W 10–0	15,000	
October 26	Dartmouth	Harvard Stadium; Boston, MA (rivalry)	W 22–7	39,000	
November 2	Penn	Harvard Stadium; Boston, MA (rivalry)	W 28–6	25,000	
November 9	at Princeton	Palmer Stadium; Princeton, NJ (rivalry)	W 9–7	36,000	
November 16	Brown	Harvard Stadium; Boston, MA	W 31–7	16,000	
November 23	Yale	Harvard Stadium; Boston, MA (The Game)	T 29–29	40,280	
*Non-conference game

== Awards ==
All-Ivy League 1st team

- Tom Jones – Guard
- Vic Gatto – Running back
- Pete Hall – Defensive end
- John Emery – Linebacker
- Pat Conway – Defensive back
- Gary Singleterry – Punter
