= 1968 Rhode Island Rams football team =

American college football season

1968 Rhode Island Rams football
- Conference: Yankee Conference
- Record: 3–6 (2–3 Yankee)
- Head coach: Jack Zilly (6th season)
- Home stadium: Meade Stadium

1968 Yankee Conference football standings
	Conf.					Overall
Team	W		L		T	W		L		T
New Hampshire +	4	–	1	–	0	6	–	2	–	0
Connecticut +	4	–	1	–	0	4	–	6	–	0
Maine	2	–	3	–	0	3	–	5	–	0
Rhode Island	2	–	3	–	0	3	–	6	–	0
UMass	2	–	3	–	0	2	–	8	–	0
Vermont	1	–	4	–	0	3	–	6	–	0
+ – Conference co-champions

The 1968 Rhode Island Rams football team was an American football team that represented the University of Rhode Island as a member of the Yankee Conference during the 1968 NCAA College Division football season. In its fifth season under head coach Jack Zilly, the team compiled a 3–6 record (2–3 against conference opponents), finished in a three-way tie for third place out of six teams in the Yankee Conference, and was outscored by a total of 168 to 137. The team played its home games at Meade Stadium in Kingston, Rhode Island.

== Schedule ==
Date	Opponent	Site	Result	Attendance	Source
September 21	at Temple*	Temple Stadium; Philadelphia, PA	L 0–28	11,000	
September 28	at Brown*	Brown Stadium; Providence, RI (rivalry)	L 9–10	11,200–13,200	
October 5	Southern Connecticut State*	Meade Stadium; Kingston, RI	W 33–8	10,000	
October 12	Vermont	Meade Stadium; Kingston, RI	W 52–10	10,600–12,000	
October 19	UMass	Meade Stadium; Kingston, RI	W 14–9	3,500	
October 26	at Maine	Alumni Field; Orono, ME	L 14–21	8,000–10,000	
November 2	at New Hampshire	Cowell Stadium; Durham, NH	L 6–27	8,133	
November 9	Boston University*	Meade Stadium; Kingston, RI	L 3–20	4,000–4,500	
November 16	at Connecticut	Memorial Stadium; Storrs, CT (rivalry)	L 6–35	10,500–11,384	
*Non-conference game
