= Gary Nowak =

American football player (born 1948)

No. 75
- Position: Defensive tackle

Personal information
- Born: December 8, 1948 (age 77); St. Clair Shores, Michigan, U.S.
- Listed height: 6 ft 5 in (1.96 m)
- Listed weight: 258 lb (117 kg)

Career information
- High school: St. Ambrose
- College: Michigan State
- NFL draft: 1971: 10th round, 247th overall pick

Career history
- San Diego Chargers (1971)
- Stats at Pro Football Reference

Gary William Nowak (born December 8, 1948) is an American former professional football player who was a defensive tackle for the San Diego Chargers of the National Football League (NFL). He played college football for the Michigan State Spartans.
