= 1968 Maine Black Bears football team =

American college football season

1968 Maine Black Bears football
- Conference: Yankee Conference
- Record: 3–5 (2–3 Yankee)
- Head coach: Walter Abbott (2nd season)
- Captains: Donald Loranger; Francis Griffin; E. Quackenbush
- Home stadium: Alumni Field

1968 Yankee Conference football standings
	Conf.					Overall
Team	W		L		T	W		L		T
New Hampshire +	4	–	1	–	0	6	–	2	–	0
Connecticut +	4	–	1	–	0	4	–	6	–	0
Maine	2	–	3	–	0	3	–	5	–	0
Rhode Island	2	–	3	–	0	3	–	6	–	0
UMass	2	–	3	–	0	2	–	8	–	0
Vermont	1	–	4	–	0	3	–	6	–	0
+ – Conference co-champions

The 1968 Maine Black Bears football team was an American football team that represented the University of Maine as a member of the Yankee Conference during the 1968 NCAA College Division football season. In its second season under head coach Walter Abbott, the team compiled a 3–5 record (2–3 against conference opponents) and finished in a three-way tie for third place in the Yankee Conference. Donald Loranger, Francis Griffin, and E. Quackenbush were the team captains.

== Schedule ==
Date	Opponent	Site	Result	Attendance	Source
September 21	at UMass	Alumni Field; Amherst, MA	L 3–21	14,000	
September 28	Boston University*^{†}	Alumni Field; Orono, ME	L 3–6	6,100	
October 5	Vermont	Alumni Field; Orono, ME	W 28–0	5,400	
October 12	at New Hampshire	Cowell Stadium; Durham, NH	L 17–42	13,000–13,050	
October 19	at Connecticut	Memorial Stadium; Storrs, CT	L 0–29	6,400–6,407	
October 26	Rhode Island	Alumni Field; Orono, ME	W 21–14	8,000–10,000	
November 2	at Bucknell*	Memorial Stadium; Lewisburg, PA	L 21–42	5,600–5,700	
November 9	Hofstra*	Alumni Field; Orono, ME	W 42–7	3,750	
*Non-conference game; ^{†}Homecoming
