= 1968 Drexel Dragons football team =

American college football season

1968 Drexel Dragons football
- Conference: Middle Atlantic Conference
- Southern College Division
- Record: 4–4 (3–1 MAC)
- Head coach: Tom Grebis (8th season)
- Home stadium: Drexel Field

1968 Middle Atlantic Conference football standings
	Conf.					Overall
Team	W		L		T	W		L		T
University Division
Delaware x	5	–	0	–	0	7	–	3	–	0
Bucknell	3	–	2	–	0	5	–	5	–	0
Lehigh	2	–	2	–	0	3	–	7	–	0
Lafayette	2	–	2	–	0	7	–	3	–	0
Temple	2	–	2	–	0	4	–	6	–	0
Hofstra	1	–	3	–	0	5	–	5	–	0
Gettysburg	1	–	4	–	0	1	–	8	–	0
West Chester *	0	–	1	–	0	5	–	3	–	0
Northern College Division
Albright x	7	–	0	–	0	8	–	1	–	0
No. T–19 Wilkes x	6	–	0	–	0	8	–	0	–	0
Delaware Valley	5	–	2	–	0	6	–	2	–	0
Juniata	4	–	2	–	0	7	–	2	–	0
Upsala	3	–	4	–	0	4	–	4	–	0
Moravian	3	–	6	–	0	3	–	6	–	0
Susquehanna	1	–	5	–	0	2	–	6	–	1
Lycoming	1	–	7	–	0	1	–	7	–	0
Wagner *	3	–	1	–	0	3	–	6	–	0
Southern College Division
Franklin & Marshall x	6	–	1	–	0	6	–	2	–	0
Johns Hopkins x	6	–	1	–	0	7	–	2	–	0
Muhlenberg	6	–	3	–	0	6	–	3	–	0
Western Maryland	3	–	3	–	0	5	–	4	–	0
Lebanon Valley	4	–	4	–	0	4	–	4	–	0
Ursinus	3	–	5	–	0	3	–	5	–	0
Pennsylvania Military	2	–	5	–	0	2	–	7	–	0
Haverford	1	–	6	–	0	1	–	6	–	0
Swarthmore	1	–	6	–	0	1	–	7	–	0
Dickinson	1	–	7	–	0	1	–	7	–	0
Drexel *	3	–	1	–	0	4	–	4	–	0
x – Division champion/co-champions; * – Ineligible for championship due to insufficient conference games; Rankings from AP small college poll

The 1968 Drexel Dragons football team represented the Drexel Institute of Technology (renamed Drexel University in 1970) as a member of the Middle Atlantic Conference during the 1968 NCAA College Division football season. Tom Grebis was the team's head coach.

== Schedule ==
Date	Time	Opponent	Site	Result	Attendance	Source
September 21		at Lehigh*	Taylor Stadium; Bethlehem, PA	L 21–59	8,500	
September 28		at Tufts*	Tufts Oval; Medford, MA	L 7–28	3,500	
October 5	2:00 pm	Juniata	Drexel Field; Philadelphia, PA	W 23–20	1,700	
October 12	1:30 pm	at RPI*	'86 Field; Troy, NY	W 20–10		
October 19	1:30 pm	at Lafayette	Fisher Stadium; Easton, PA	L 0–27	3,500	
October 26		at Albright	Albright Stadium; Reading, PA	L 0–28		
November 2		Pennsylvania Military^{†}	Drexel Field; Philadelphia, PA	W 35–13	5,000	
November 16		Western Maryland	Drexel Field; Philadelphia, PA	W 42–14	2,000	
*Non-conference game; ^{†}Homecoming; All times are in Eastern time
