= 1968 Western Michigan Broncos football team =

American college football season

1968 Western Michigan Broncos football
- Conference: Mid-American Conference
- Record: 3–6 (2–4 MAC)
- Head coach: Bill Doolittle (5th season)
- MVP: Dave Hudson
- Captains: Jerry Collins; Tim Majerle
- Home stadium: Waldo Stadium

1968 Mid-American Conference football standings
	Conf.					Overall
Team	W		L		T	W		L		T
No. 20 Ohio $	6	–	0	–	0	10	–	1	–	0
Miami (OH)	5	–	1	–	0	7	–	3	–	0
Bowling Green	3	–	2	–	1	6	–	3	–	1
Toledo	3	–	2	–	1	5	–	4	–	1
Western Michigan	2	–	4	–	0	3	–	6	–	0
Kent State	1	–	5	–	0	1	–	9	–	0
Marshall	0	–	6	–	0	0	–	9	–	1
$ – Conference champion; Rankings from AP Poll

The 1968 Western Michigan Broncos football team represented Western Michigan University in the Mid-American Conference (MAC) during the 1968 NCAA University Division football season. In their fifth season under head coach Bill Doolittle, the Broncos compiled a 3–6 record (2–4 against MAC opponents), finished in fifth place in the MAC, and were outscored by their opponents, 191 to 160. The team played its home games at Waldo Stadium in Kalamazoo, Michigan.

The team's statistical leaders included Mark Boudeaux with 1,143 passing yards, Ken Woodside with 474 rushing yards, and Al Bellile with 394 receiving yards. Defensive end Jerry Collins and fullback Tim Majerle were the team captains. Defensive back Dave Hudson received the team's most outstanding player award.

== Schedule ==
Date	Opponent	Site	Result	Attendance	Source
September 14	Arkansas State*	Waldo Stadium; Kalamazoo, MI	W 20–0	15,500	
September 21	BYU*	Waldo Stadium; Kalamazoo, MI	L 7–17	12,300–26,571	
September 28	at Miami (OH)	Miami Field; Oxford, OH	L 0–28	14,112	
October 5	Bowling Green	Waldo Stadium; Kalamazoo, MI	L 10–17	19,200	
October 12	at Kent State	Memorial Stadium; Kent, OH	W 14–0	9,000	
October 19	Toledo	Waldo Stadium; Kalamazoo, MI	L 6–30	8,700	
October 26	at Marshall	Fairfield Stadium; Huntington, WV	W 40–12	8,000	
November 2	No. 19 Ohio	Waldo Stadium; Kalamazoo, MI	L 17–22	12,000	
November 9	at West Texas State*	Buffalo Bowl; Canyon, TX	L 20–28	14,500	
*Non-conference game; Rankings from AP Poll released prior to the game
