= 1968 Toledo Rockets football team =

American college football season

1968 Toledo Rockets football
- Conference: Mid-American Conference
- Record: 5–4–1 (3–2–1 MAC)
- Head coach: Frank Lauterbur (6th season)
- Home stadium: Glass Bowl

1968 Mid-American Conference football standings
	Conf.					Overall
Team	W		L		T	W		L		T
No. 20 Ohio $	6	–	0	–	0	10	–	1	–	0
Miami (OH)	5	–	1	–	0	7	–	3	–	0
Bowling Green	3	–	2	–	1	6	–	3	–	1
Toledo	3	–	2	–	1	5	–	4	–	1
Western Michigan	2	–	4	–	0	3	–	6	–	0
Kent State	1	–	5	–	0	1	–	9	–	0
Marshall	0	–	6	–	0	0	–	9	–	1
$ – Conference champion; Rankings from AP Poll

The 1968 Toledo Rockets football team was an American football team that represented the University of Toledo in the Mid-American Conference (MAC) during the 1968 NCAA University Division football season. In their sixth season under head coach Frank Lauterbur, the Rockets compiled a 5–4–1 record (3–2–1 against MAC opponents), and outscored all opponents by a combined total of 230 to 156. Toledo won the first three games of the season, part of a 12-game winning streak that extended back into the 1967 season.

The team's statistical leaders on offense included Steve Jones with 1,197 passing yards, Roland Moss with 1,145 rushing yards and 84 points scored, and David Daniels with 344 receiving yards. Mel Tucker and Bob Pfefferle were the team captains.

== Schedule ==
Date	Opponent	Site	Result	Attendance	Source
September 14	Richmond*	Glass Bowl; Toledo, OH	W 31–14	13,075	
September 21	at Villanova*	Villanova Stadium; Villanova, PA	W 45–21	8,134	
September 28	Marshall	Glass Bowl; Toledo, OH	W 35–12	15,231	
October 5	at Ohio	Peden Stadium; Athens, OH	L 31–40	17,607	
October 12	Bowling Green	Glass Bowl; Toledo, OH (rivalry)	T 0–0	18,236	
October 19	at Western Michigan	Waldo Stadium; Kalamazoo, MI	W 30–6	8,700	
October 26	at Kent State	Memorial Stadium; Kent, OH	W 28–12	14,500	
November 2	Miami (OH)	Glass Bowl; Toledo, OH	L 17–21	16,276	
November 9	Xavier*	Glass Bowl; Toledo, OH	L 10–20	6,837	
November 16	at Dayton*	Baujan Field; Dayton, OH	L 3–10	8,852	
*Non-conference game

== After the season ==
=== NFL/AFL draft ===
The following Rockets were selected in the 1969 NFL/AFL draft following the season.

Round	Pick	Player	Position	NFL club
7	181	Roland Moss	Running back	Baltimore Colts
