= St. Ambrose High School (Grosse Pointe, Michigan) =

Location
- Grosse Pointe Park, Michigan; United States
- Coordinates: 42°22′35.1″N 82°56′20.2″W

Information
- Type: Private, Coed
- Established: 1923
- Closed: 1972
- Grades: 9–12
- Colors: Maroon and White
- Athletics conference: Catholic High School League
- Nickname: Cavaliers

St. Ambrose High School was a coeducational Catholic high school in Grosse Pointe Park, Michigan, United States. The school was opened in 1923 and closed in 1972.

== Athletics ==
St. Ambrose was a Class C school but was a football power in the Detroit Catholic High School League. Before there were state playoffs in Michigan, there was the Goodfellow Game, matching the Detroit Catholic High School League champion against the Detroit City League (later the Detroit Public School League) champion.

In 1959, St. Ambrose faced a much larger Detroit Cooley team, which was ranked number one in Class A, in what appeared to be a classic mismatch. St. Ambrose stunned Cooley, 13-6.

St. Ambrose would go on to win the Goodfellow Game again in 1961, 1962, 1964 and 1966.

From 1957 to 1967, St. Ambrose produced five football All-Americans and 12 All-State players. Many would go on to play major-college football on the campuses of the University of Houston, the University of Michigan, Michigan State University, the University of Nebraska–Lincoln, the University of Wyoming, and the University of Detroit.

Two St. Ambrose players, Tom Beer and Gary Nowak, played in the National Football League.

Two of the coaches, Tom Boisture and his successor George Perles, would go on to win a combined six Super Bowl rings in the NFL.
