= 1968 Temple Owls football team =

American college football season

1968 Temple Owls football
- Conference: Middle Atlantic Conference
- University Division
- Record: 4–6 (2–2 MAC)
- Head coach: George Makris (9th season)
- Home stadium: Temple Stadium

1968 Middle Atlantic Conference football standings
	Conf.					Overall
Team	W		L		T	W		L		T
University Division
Delaware x	5	–	0	–	0	7	–	3	–	0
Bucknell	3	–	2	–	0	5	–	5	–	0
Lehigh	2	–	2	–	0	3	–	7	–	0
Lafayette	2	–	2	–	0	7	–	3	–	0
Temple	2	–	2	–	0	4	–	6	–	0
Hofstra	1	–	3	–	0	5	–	5	–	0
Gettysburg	1	–	4	–	0	1	–	8	–	0
West Chester *	0	–	1	–	0	5	–	3	–	0
Northern College Division
Albright x	7	–	0	–	0	8	–	1	–	0
No. T–19 Wilkes x	6	–	0	–	0	8	–	0	–	0
Delaware Valley	5	–	2	–	0	6	–	2	–	0
Juniata	4	–	2	–	0	7	–	2	–	0
Upsala	3	–	4	–	0	4	–	4	–	0
Moravian	3	–	6	–	0	3	–	6	–	0
Susquehanna	1	–	5	–	0	2	–	6	–	1
Lycoming	1	–	7	–	0	1	–	7	–	0
Wagner *	3	–	1	–	0	3	–	6	–	0
Southern College Division
Franklin & Marshall x	6	–	1	–	0	6	–	2	–	0
Johns Hopkins x	6	–	1	–	0	7	–	2	–	0
Muhlenberg	6	–	3	–	0	6	–	3	–	0
Western Maryland	3	–	3	–	0	5	–	4	–	0
Lebanon Valley	4	–	4	–	0	4	–	4	–	0
Ursinus	3	–	5	–	0	3	–	5	–	0
Pennsylvania Military	2	–	5	–	0	2	–	7	–	0
Haverford	1	–	6	–	0	1	–	6	–	0
Swarthmore	1	–	6	–	0	1	–	7	–	0
Dickinson	1	–	7	–	0	1	–	7	–	0
Drexel *	3	–	1	–	0	4	–	4	–	0
x – Division champion/co-champions; * – Ineligible for championship due to insufficient conference games; Rankings from AP small college poll

The 1968 Temple Owls football team was an American football team that represented Temple University as a member of the Middle Atlantic Conference (MAC) during the 1968 NCAA College Division football season. In its ninth season under head coach George Makris, the team compiled a 4–6 record (2–2 against MAC opponents). The team played its home games at Temple Stadium in Philadelphia.

== Schedule ==
Date	Opponent	Site	Result	Attendance	Source
September 21	Rhode Island*	Temple Stadium; Philadelphia, PA	W 28–0	11,000	
September 28	at Wayne State (MI)*	University of Detroit Stadium; Detroit, MI	W 26–6	5,210–8,212	
October 5	at Boston University*	Nickerson Field; Boston, MA	L 0–7	4,000	
October 12	Bucknell	Temple Stadium; Philadelphia, PA	L 26–29	8,000	
October 19	at Hofstra	Hofstra Stadium; Hempstead, NY	W 20–12	4,800	
October 26	Delaware	Temple Stadium; Philadelphia, PA	L 27–50	7,500	
November 2	Buffalo	Temple Stadium; Philadelphia, PA	L 40–50	6,000–6,500	
November 9	at Gettysburg	Musselman Stadium; Gettysburg, PA	W 30–11	3,259	
November 16	Northeastern*	Temple Stadium; Philadelphia, PA	L 26–41	5,000	
November 23	Dayton*	Temple Stadium; Philadelphia, PA	L 17–35	6,000	
*Non-conference game
