= 1968 Hofstra Flying Dutchmen football team =

American college football season

1968 Hofstra Flying Dutchmen football
- Conference: Middle Atlantic Conference
- University Division
- Record: 5–5 (1–3 MAC)
- Head coach: Howdy Myers (19th season)
- Captains: Bob Devin; Richie Green; Harry Royle
- Home stadium: Hofstra Stadium

1968 Middle Atlantic Conference football standings
	Conf.					Overall
Team	W		L		T	W		L		T
University Division
Delaware x	5	–	0	–	0	7	–	3	–	0
Bucknell	3	–	2	–	0	5	–	5	–	0
Lehigh	2	–	2	–	0	3	–	7	–	0
Lafayette	2	–	2	–	0	7	–	3	–	0
Temple	2	–	2	–	0	4	–	6	–	0
Hofstra	1	–	3	–	0	5	–	5	–	0
Gettysburg	1	–	4	–	0	1	–	8	–	0
West Chester *	0	–	1	–	0	5	–	3	–	0
Northern College Division
Albright x	7	–	0	–	0	8	–	1	–	0
No. T–19 Wilkes x	6	–	0	–	0	8	–	0	–	0
Delaware Valley	5	–	2	–	0	6	–	2	–	0
Juniata	4	–	2	–	0	7	–	2	–	0
Upsala	3	–	4	–	0	4	–	4	–	0
Moravian	3	–	6	–	0	3	–	6	–	0
Susquehanna	1	–	5	–	0	2	–	6	–	1
Lycoming	1	–	7	–	0	1	–	7	–	0
Wagner *	3	–	1	–	0	3	–	6	–	0
Southern College Division
Franklin & Marshall x	6	–	1	–	0	6	–	2	–	0
Johns Hopkins x	6	–	1	–	0	7	–	2	–	0
Muhlenberg	6	–	3	–	0	6	–	3	–	0
Western Maryland	3	–	3	–	0	5	–	4	–	0
Lebanon Valley	4	–	4	–	0	4	–	4	–	0
Ursinus	3	–	5	–	0	3	–	5	–	0
Pennsylvania Military	2	–	5	–	0	2	–	7	–	0
Haverford	1	–	6	–	0	1	–	6	–	0
Swarthmore	1	–	6	–	0	1	–	7	–	0
Dickinson	1	–	7	–	0	1	–	7	–	0
Drexel *	3	–	1	–	0	4	–	4	–	0
x – Division champion/co-champions; * – Ineligible for championship due to insufficient conference games; Rankings from AP small college poll

The 1968 Hofstra Flying Dutchmen football team was an American football team that represented Hofstra University during the 1968 NCAA College Division football season. Hofstra placed sixth in the Middle Atlantic Conference, University Division.

In their 19th year under head coach Howard "Howdy" Myers Jr., the Flying Dutchmen compiled a 5–5 record, but were outscored 171 to 155. Bob Devin, Richie Green and Harry Royle were the team captains.

Hofstra's 1–3 record against MAC University Division opponents was the second-worst of the division's seven competitors, just half a game ahead of Gettysburg's 1–4. League member West Chester is listed below both teams on standings tables, but was not eligible for the championship, as it only played one divisional game.

The Flying Dutchmen played their home games at Hofstra Stadium on the university's Hempstead campus on Long Island, New York.

== Schedule ==
Date	Opponent	Site	Result	Attendance	Source
September 14	at Gettysburg	Musselman Stadium; Gettysburg, PA	W 26–10	4,443	
September 21	at Delaware	Delaware Stadium; Newark, DE	L 0–35	10,840	
September 28	Albion	Hofstra Stadium; Hempstead, NY	W 34–14	5,100	
October 5	at Lafayette	Fisher Field; Easton, PA	L 0–7	5,000	
October 19	Temple	Hofstra Stadium; Hempstead, NY	L 12–20	4,800	
October 26	at Bridgeport*	John F. Kennedy Stadium; Bridgeport, CT	W 30–16	5,100	
November 2	No. 20 Merchant Marine^{†}*	Hofstra Stadium; Hempstead, NY	L 9–13	7,400–7,500	
November 9	at Maine*	Alumni Field; Orono, ME	L 7–42	3,750	
November 16	Wagner*	Hofstra Stadium; Hempstead, NY	W 26–7	2,508	
November 28	at C.W. Post*	Post Bowl; Brookville, NY	W 11–7	4,512	
*Non-conference game; ^{†}Homecoming; Rankings from UPI Poll released prior to the game
