= 1968 Lafayette Leopards football team =

American college football season

1968 Lafayette Leopards football
- Conference: Middle Atlantic Conference
- University Division
- Record: 7–3 (2–2 MAC)
- Head coach: Harry Gamble (2nd season)
- Captain: Richard Lettieri
- Home stadium: Fisher Field

1968 Middle Atlantic Conference football standings
| | Conf. | | | | | Overall |
| Team | W | | L | | T | W | | L | | T |
|---|---|---|---|---|---|---|---|---|---|---|
University Division
| Delaware x | 5 | – | 0 | – | 0 | 7 | – | 3 | – | 0 |
| Bucknell | 3 | – | 2 | – | 0 | 5 | – | 5 | – | 0 |
| Lehigh | 2 | – | 2 | – | 0 | 3 | – | 7 | – | 0 |
| Lafayette | 2 | – | 2 | – | 0 | 7 | – | 3 | – | 0 |
| Temple | 2 | – | 2 | – | 0 | 4 | – | 6 | – | 0 |
| Hofstra | 1 | – | 3 | – | 0 | 5 | – | 5 | – | 0 |
| Gettysburg | 1 | – | 4 | – | 0 | 1 | – | 8 | – | 0 |
| West Chester * | 0 | – | 1 | – | 0 | 5 | – | 3 | – | 0 |
Northern College Division
| Albright x | 7 | – | 0 | – | 0 | 8 | – | 1 | – | 0 |
| No. T–19 Wilkes x | 6 | – | 0 | – | 0 | 8 | – | 0 | – | 0 |
| Delaware Valley | 5 | – | 2 | – | 0 | 6 | – | 2 | – | 0 |
| Juniata | 4 | – | 2 | – | 0 | 7 | – | 2 | – | 0 |
| Upsala | 3 | – | 4 | – | 0 | 4 | – | 4 | – | 0 |
| Moravian | 3 | – | 6 | – | 0 | 3 | – | 6 | – | 0 |
| Susquehanna | 1 | – | 5 | – | 0 | 2 | – | 6 | – | 1 |
| Lycoming | 1 | – | 7 | – | 0 | 1 | – | 7 | – | 0 |
| Wagner * | 3 | – | 1 | – | 0 | 3 | – | 6 | – | 0 |
Southern College Division
| Franklin & Marshall x | 6 | – | 1 | – | 0 | 6 | – | 2 | – | 0 |
| Johns Hopkins x | 6 | – | 1 | – | 0 | 7 | – | 2 | – | 0 |
| Muhlenberg | 6 | – | 3 | – | 0 | 6 | – | 3 | – | 0 |
| Western Maryland | 3 | – | 3 | – | 0 | 5 | – | 4 | – | 0 |
| Lebanon Valley | 4 | – | 4 | – | 0 | 4 | – | 4 | – | 0 |
| Ursinus | 3 | – | 5 | – | 0 | 3 | – | 5 | – | 0 |
| Pennsylvania Military | 2 | – | 5 | – | 0 | 2 | – | 7 | – | 0 |
| Haverford | 1 | – | 6 | – | 0 | 1 | – | 6 | – | 0 |
| Swarthmore | 1 | – | 6 | – | 0 | 1 | – | 7 | – | 0 |
| Dickinson | 1 | – | 7 | – | 0 | 1 | – | 7 | – | 0 |
| Drexel * | 3 | – | 1 | – | 0 | 4 | – | 4 | – | 0 |
x – Division champion/co-champions; * – Ineligible for championship due to insufficient conference games; Rankings from AP small college poll

The 1968 Lafayette Leopards football team was an American football team that represented Lafayette College during the 1968 NCAA College Division football season. Lafayette tied for third in the Middle Atlantic Conference, University Division, and placed last in the Middle Three Conference.

In their second year under head coach Harry Gamble, the Leopards compiled a 7–3 record. Richard Lettieri was the team captain.

At 2–2 against MAC University Division foes, Lafayette tied Lehigh and Temple for third place in the eight-team circuit. Lafayette dropped both of its games against Middle Three rivals, losing to Lehigh and Rutgers.

Lafayette played its home games at Fisher Field on College Hill in Easton, Pennsylvania.

== Schedule ==
| Date | Opponent | Site | Result | Attendance | Source |
|---|---|---|---|---|---|
| September 21 | at Rutgers | Rutgers Stadium; Piscataway, NJ | L 7–37 | 15,000–16,000 | |
| September 28 | at Columbia* | Baker Field; New York, NY | W 36–14 | 7,441 | |
| October 5 | Hofstra | Fisher Field; Easton, PA | W 7–0 | 5,000 | |
| October 12 | at Washington & Lee* | Wilson Field; Lexington, VA | W 27–7 | 2,000 | |
| October 19 | Drexel* | Fisher Field; Easton, PA | W 27–0 | 3,000–3,500 | |
| October 26 | at Bucknell | Memorial Stadium; Lewisburg, PA | L 10–13 | 6,000 | |
| November 2 | Gettysburg | Fisher Field; Easton, PA | W 37–0 | 10,000 | |
| November 9 | No. 18 Merchant Marine* | Fisher Field; Easton, PA | W 7–0 | 8,500 | |
| November 16 | at Colgate* | Andy Kerr Stadium; Hamilton, NY | W 14–10 | 5,500–6,000 | |
| November 23 | Lehigh | Fisher Field; Easton, PA (The Rivalry) | L 6–21 | 16,000 | |
*Non-conference game; Rankings from UPI Poll released prior to the game
