= 1968 Holy Cross Crusaders football team =

American college football season

1968 Holy Cross Crusaders football
- Conference: Independent
- Record: 3–6–1
- Head coach: Tom Boisture (2nd season)
- Captains: Robert A. Neary; Daniel G. Raymondi
- Home stadium: Fitton Field

1968 NCAA University Division independents football records
	Conf.			Overall
Team	W	L	T	W		L		T
No. 2 Penn State		–		11	–	0	–	0
Rutgers		–		8	–	2	–	0
West Texas State		–		8	–	2	–	0
No. 5 Notre Dame		–		7	–	2	–	1
Florida State		–		8	–	3	–	0
Air Force		–		7	–	3	–	0
Army		–		7	–	3	–	0
Buffalo		–		7	–	3	–	0
No. 18 Houston		–		6	–	2	–	2
Utah State		–		7	–	3	–	0
Boston College		–		7	–	3	–	0
West Virginia		–		7	–	3	–	0
Virginia Tech		–		7	–	4	–	0
Syracuse		–		6	–	4	–	0
Villanova		–		6	–	4	–	0
Xavier		–		6	–	4	–	0
Colgate		–		5	–	5	–	0
Dayton		–		5	–	5	–	0
Miami (FL)		–		5	–	5	–	0
New Mexico State		–		5	–	5	–	0
Georgia Tech		–		4	–	6	–	0
Southern Miss		–		4	–	6	–	0
Holy Cross		–		3	–	6	–	1
San Jose State		–		3	–	7	–	0
Navy		–		2	–	8	–	0
Tulane		–		2	–	8	–	0
Pittsburgh		–		1	–	9	–	0
Rankings from AP Poll

The 1968 Holy Cross Crusaders football team was an American football team that represented the College of the Holy Cross as an independent during the 1968 NCAA University Division football season. For the second year, Tom Boisture served as head coach. The team compiled a record of 3–6–1.

All home games were played at Fitton Field on the Holy Cross campus in Worcester, Massachusetts.

== Schedule ==
Date	Opponent	Site	Result	Attendance	Source
September 28	at Harvard	Harvard Stadium; Boston, MA	L 20–27	23,000	
October 5	Dartmouth^{†}	Fitton Field; Worcester, MA	W 29–17	16,500	
October 12	at Colgate	Andy Kerr Stadium; Hamilton, NY	L 6–14	8,000	
October 19	at Boston University	Nickerson Field; Boston, MA	T 7–7	8,000	
October 26	at Buffalo	Rotary Field; Buffalo, NY	L 9–10	6,207	
November 2	Syracuse^	Fitton Field; Worcester, MA	L 0–47	14,900	
November 9	UMass	Fitton Field; Worcester, MA	W 47–20	10,190	
November 16	at Rutgers	Rutgers Stadium; Piscataway, NJ	L 14–41	11,000	
November 23	Connecticut	Fitton Field; Worcester, MA	W 27–24	7,331	
November 30	at Boston College	Alumni Stadium; Chestnut Hill, MA (rivalry)	L 20–40	26,000	
^{†}Homecoming; ^ Family Weekend

== Statistical leaders ==
Statistical leaders for the 1968 Crusaders included:

- Rushing: Steve Jutras, 642 yards and 7 touchdowns on 161 attempts
- Passing: Phil O'Neil, 1,067 yards, 79 completions and 7 touchdowns on 157 attempts
- Receiving: Bob Neary, 677 yards and 6 touchdowns on 47 receptions
- Scoring: Steve Jutras, 48 points from 8 touchdowns
- Total offense: Phil O'Neil, 1,016 yards (1,067 passing, minus-51 rushing)
- All-purpose yards: Steve Jutras, 698 yards (642 rushing, 56 receiving)
