= Dave Puddington =

American football coach (1928–2023)

Biographical details
- Born: July 9, 1928; Canton, Ohio, U.S.
- Died: October 18, 2023 (aged 95); Gainesville, Georgia, U.S.

Playing career

Football
- 1947–1949: Ohio Wesleyan

Basketball
- 1946–1950: Ohio Wesleyan
- Positions: Center, linebacker (football)

Coaching career (HC unless noted)

Football
- c. 1957: Fairmont HS (OH) (assistant)
- 1958: Fairmont HS (OH)
- 1959–1961: Kent State (backfield)
- 1962–1967: Washington University
- 1968–1970: Kent State
- 1977: Lake Braddock SS (VA)

Head coaching record
- Overall: 45–37–3 (college)

Accomplishments and honors

Championships
- 2 CAC (1964, 1966)

David George Puddington (July 9, 1928 – October 18, 2023) was an American football coach. He served as the head football coach at Washington University in St. Louis from 1962 to 1967 and at Kent State University from 1968 to 1970, compiling a career college football head coaching record of 45–37–3. Puddington was a native of Canton, Ohio. He played football and basketball at Ohio Wesleyan University. After serving in the United States Navy, Puddington began his coaching career as an assistant to Jack Fouts at Fairmont High School in Kettering, Ohio. He was appointed head football coach there in 1958 and led his team to a 9–0 record and a seventh-place ranking among high schools in the state that season. In 1959, Puddington moved to Kent State, where he served as backfield coach under Trevor J. Rees for three seasons.

Puddington resigned as head coach at Kent State following the 1970 season, noting "the prevailing contagious negativism on campus and in the community". Four students had been killed that May in the Kent State shootings. Puddington returned to coaching for one season in 1977 at Lake Braddock Secondary School in Burke, Virginia.

Following his coaching career, Puddington worked in fundraising and public relations for Ohio University, West Virginia Wesleyan College, Thomas Edison State University, and Morrisville State College. He and his wife, Jean, moved to Lowville, New York in 2009. Puddington died on October 18, 2023, at the home of his son, Jim, in Gainesville, Georgia. He was 95.

== Head coaching record ==
=== College ===
Year	Team	Overall	Conference	Standing	Bowl/playoffs
Washington University Bears (College Athletic Conference) (1962–1967)
1962	Washington University	5–3	0–0	NA	
1963	Washington University	6–2–1	1–1	3rd	
1964	Washington University	6–3–1	3–1	T–1st	
1965	Washington University	7–2	3–1	2nd	
1966	Washington University	7–2	4–0	1st	
1967	Washington University	5–4–1	2–2	T–2nd	
Washington University:		36–16–3	13–5		
Kent State Golden Flashes (Mid-American Conference) (1968–1970)
1968	Kent State	1–9	1–5	6th	
1969	Kent State	5–5	1–5	7th	
1970	Kent State	3–7	1–4	T–5th	
Kent State:		9–21	3–14		
Total:		45–37–3			
