= 1968 Lehigh Engineers football team =

American college football season

1968 Lehigh Engineers football
- Conference: Middle Atlantic Conference
- University Division
- Record: 3–7 (2–2 MAC)
- Head coach: Fred Dunlap (4th season)
- Captains: Rick Laubach; John Miller
- Home stadium: Taylor Stadium

1968 Middle Atlantic Conference football standings
	Conf.					Overall
Team	W		L		T	W		L		T
University Division
Delaware x	5	–	0	–	0	7	–	3	–	0
Bucknell	3	–	2	–	0	5	–	5	–	0
Lehigh	2	–	2	–	0	3	–	7	–	0
Lafayette	2	–	2	–	0	7	–	3	–	0
Temple	2	–	2	–	0	4	–	6	–	0
Hofstra	1	–	3	–	0	5	–	5	–	0
Gettysburg	1	–	4	–	0	1	–	8	–	0
West Chester *	0	–	1	–	0	5	–	3	–	0
Northern College Division
Albright x	7	–	0	–	0	8	–	1	–	0
No. T–19 Wilkes x	6	–	0	–	0	8	–	0	–	0
Delaware Valley	5	–	2	–	0	6	–	2	–	0
Juniata	4	–	2	–	0	7	–	2	–	0
Upsala	3	–	4	–	0	4	–	4	–	0
Moravian	3	–	6	–	0	3	–	6	–	0
Susquehanna	1	–	5	–	0	2	–	6	–	1
Lycoming	1	–	7	–	0	1	–	7	–	0
Wagner *	3	–	1	–	0	3	–	6	–	0
Southern College Division
Franklin & Marshall x	6	–	1	–	0	6	–	2	–	0
Johns Hopkins x	6	–	1	–	0	7	–	2	–	0
Muhlenberg	6	–	3	–	0	6	–	3	–	0
Western Maryland	3	–	3	–	0	5	–	4	–	0
Lebanon Valley	4	–	4	–	0	4	–	4	–	0
Ursinus	3	–	5	–	0	3	–	5	–	0
Pennsylvania Military	2	–	5	–	0	2	–	7	–	0
Haverford	1	–	6	–	0	1	–	6	–	0
Swarthmore	1	–	6	–	0	1	–	7	–	0
Dickinson	1	–	7	–	0	1	–	7	–	0
Drexel *	3	–	1	–	0	4	–	4	–	0
x – Division champion/co-champions; * – Ineligible for championship due to insufficient conference games; Rankings from AP small college poll

The 1968 Lehigh Engineers football team was an American football team that represented Lehigh University during the 1968 NCAA College Division football season. Lehigh tied for second in the Middle Atlantic Conference, University Division, and placed second in the Middle Three Conference.

In their fourth year under head coach Fred Dunlap, the Engineers compiled a 3–7 record. Rick Laubach and John Miller were the team captains.

Despite their overall losing record, Lehigh finished the year at .500 in conference play. The Engineers' 2–2 record against MAC University Division foes tied Lafayette and Temple for third place in the eight-team circuit. They went 1–1 against Middle Three rivals, beating Lafayette but losing to Rutgers.

Lehigh played its home games at Taylor Stadium on the university campus in Bethlehem, Pennsylvania.

== Schedule ==
Date	Opponent	Site	Result	Attendance	Source
September 21	Drexel*	Taylor Stadium; Bethlehem, PA	W 59–21	8,000–8,500	
September 28	at The Citadel*	Johnson Hagood Stadium; Charleston, SC	L 12–28	15,400–15,450	
October 5	Wittenberg*	Taylor Stadium; Bethlehem, PA	L 14–37	9,500	
October 12	Rutgers	Taylor Stadium; Bethlehem, PA	L 26–29	9,300	
October 19	at Penn*	Franklin Field; Philadelphia, PA	L 0–34	8,916	
October 26	at Gettysburg	Musselman Stadium; Gettysburg, PA	W 34–14	4,647	
November 2	at Colgate*	Andy Kerr Stadium; Hamilton, NY	L 11–27	8,500	
November 9	Delaware	Taylor Stadium; Bethlehem, PA (rivalry)	L 13–37	9,000	
November 16	Bucknell	Taylor Stadium; Bethlehem, PA	L 27–31	7,500	
November 23	at Lafayette	Fisher Field; Easton, PA (The Rivalry)	W 21–6	16,000	
*Non-conference game
