= 1968 Bucknell Bison football team =

American college football season

1968 Bucknell Bison football
- Conference: Middle Atlantic Conference
- University Division
- Record: 5–5 (3–2 MAC)
- Head coach: Carroll Huntress (4th season)
- Captain: Sam Havrilak
- Home stadium: Memorial Stadium

1968 Middle Atlantic Conference football standings
	Conf.					Overall
Team	W		L		T	W		L		T
University Division
Delaware x	5	–	0	–	0	7	–	3	–	0
Bucknell	3	–	2	–	0	5	–	5	–	0
Lehigh	2	–	2	–	0	3	–	7	–	0
Lafayette	2	–	2	–	0	7	–	3	–	0
Temple	2	–	2	–	0	4	–	6	–	0
Hofstra	1	–	3	–	0	5	–	5	–	0
Gettysburg	1	–	4	–	0	1	–	8	–	0
West Chester *	0	–	1	–	0	5	–	3	–	0
Northern College Division
Albright x	7	–	0	–	0	8	–	1	–	0
No. T–19 Wilkes x	6	–	0	–	0	8	–	0	–	0
Delaware Valley	5	–	2	–	0	6	–	2	–	0
Juniata	4	–	2	–	0	7	–	2	–	0
Upsala	3	–	4	–	0	4	–	4	–	0
Moravian	3	–	6	–	0	3	–	6	–	0
Susquehanna	1	–	5	–	0	2	–	6	–	1
Lycoming	1	–	7	–	0	1	–	7	–	0
Wagner *	3	–	1	–	0	3	–	6	–	0
Southern College Division
Franklin & Marshall x	6	–	1	–	0	6	–	2	–	0
Johns Hopkins x	6	–	1	–	0	7	–	2	–	0
Muhlenberg	6	–	3	–	0	6	–	3	–	0
Western Maryland	3	–	3	–	0	5	–	4	–	0
Lebanon Valley	4	–	4	–	0	4	–	4	–	0
Ursinus	3	–	5	–	0	3	–	5	–	0
Pennsylvania Military	2	–	5	–	0	2	–	7	–	0
Haverford	1	–	6	–	0	1	–	6	–	0
Swarthmore	1	–	6	–	0	1	–	7	–	0
Dickinson	1	–	7	–	0	1	–	7	–	0
Drexel *	3	–	1	–	0	4	–	4	–	0
x – Division champion/co-champions; * – Ineligible for championship due to insufficient conference games; Rankings from AP small college poll

The 1968 Bucknell Bison football team was an American football team that represented Bucknell University during the 1968 NCAA College Division football season. Bucknell placed second in the Middle Atlantic Conference, University Division.

In their fourth and final year under head coach Carroll Huntress, the Bison compiled a 5–5 record. Sam Havrilak was the team captain.

The Bisons' 3–2 record against MAC University Division opponents was the second-best in the eight-team division. Bucknell was one of only two teams, along with Delaware (5–0) to post a winning record in divisional games.

Bucknell played its home games at Memorial Stadium on the university campus in Lewisburg, Pennsylvania.

== Schedule ==
Date	Opponent	Site	Result	Attendance	Source
September 21	Davidson*	Memorial Stadium; Lewisburg, PA	W 22–13	5,700	
September 28	at Penn*	Franklin Field; Philadelphia, PA	L 10–27	12,303	
October 5	at Harvard*	Harvard Stadium; Boston, MA	L 0–59	12,000	
October 12	at Temple	Temple Stadium; Philadelphia, PA	W 29–26	8,000	
October 19	at Gettysburg	Musselman Stadium; Gettysburg, PA	L 7–12	3,800	
October 26	Lafayette^{†}	Memorial Stadium; Lewisburg, PA	W 13–10	6,000	
November 2	Maine*	Memorial Stadium; Lewisburg, PA	W 42–21	5,700	
November 9	Colgate^*	Memorial Stadium; Lewisburg, PA	L 34–48	8,100	
November 16	at Lehigh	Taylor Stadium; Bethlehem, PA	W 31–27	7,500–7,600	
November 23	at No. 20 Delaware	Delaware Stadium; Newark, DE	L 12–38	10,924	
*Non-conference game; ^{†}Homecoming; ^ Parents Weekend; Rankings from UPI Poll released prior to the game
