= 1968 UMass Redmen football team =

American college football season

1968 UMass Redmen football
- Conference: Yankee Conference
- Record: 2–8 (2–3 Yankee)
- Head coach: Vic Fusia (8th season)
- Home stadium: Alumni Stadium

1968 Yankee Conference football standings
	Conf.					Overall
Team	W		L		T	W		L		T
New Hampshire +	4	–	1	–	0	6	–	2	–	0
Connecticut +	4	–	1	–	0	4	–	6	–	0
Maine	2	–	3	–	0	3	–	5	–	0
Rhode Island	2	–	3	–	0	3	–	6	–	0
UMass	2	–	3	–	0	2	–	8	–	0
Vermont	1	–	4	–	0	3	–	6	–	0
+ – Conference co-champions

The 1968 UMass Redmen football team represented the University of Massachusetts Amherst in the 1968 NCAA College Division football season as a member of the Yankee Conference. The team was coached by Vic Fusia and played its home games at Alumni Stadium in Hadley, Massachusetts. UMass finished the season with a record of 2–8 overall and 2–3 in conference play.

== Schedule ==
Date	Opponent	Site	Result	Attendance	Source
September 21	Maine	Alumni Stadium; Hadley, MA	W 21–3	14,000	
September 27	at Buffalo*	War Memorial Stadium; Buffalo, NY (rivalry)	L 0–23	9,434–9,493	
October 5	at Delaware*	Delaware Stadium; Newark, DE	L 23–28	13,261	
October 12	Boston University*	Alumni Stadium; Hadley, MA	L 7–21	13,000–13,200	
October 19	at Rhode Island	Meade Stadium; Kingston, RI	L 9–14	3,500	
October 26	Connecticut	Alumni Stadium; Hadley, MA (rivalry)	L 20–27	17,500	
November 2	at Vermont	Centennial Field; Burlington, VT	W 49–0	3,500–4,500	
November 9	at Holy Cross*	Fitton Field; Worcester, MA	L 20–47	10,190	
November 16	New Hampshire	Alumni Stadium; Hadley, MA (rivalry)	L 0–16	8,000	
November 23	Boston College*	Alumni Stadium; Hadley, MA (rivalry)	L 6–21	12,000	
*Non-conference game
