= 1968 Delaware Fightin' Blue Hens football team =

American college football season

1968 Delaware Fightin' Blue Hens football

MAC University Division champion Lambert Cup

Boardwalk Bowl, W 31–24 vs. IUP
- Conference: Middle Atlantic Conference
- University Division
- Record: 8–3 (5–0 MAC)
- Head coach: Tubby Raymond (3rd season)
- Offensive coordinator: Ted Kempski (1st season)
- Offensive scheme: Delaware Wing-T
- Base defense: 5–2
- Captain: Bob Novotny
- Home stadium: Delaware Stadium

1968 Middle Atlantic Conference football standings
	Conf.					Overall
Team	W		L		T	W		L		T
University Division
Delaware x	5	–	0	–	0	7	–	3	–	0
Bucknell	3	–	2	–	0	5	–	5	–	0
Lehigh	2	–	2	–	0	3	–	7	–	0
Lafayette	2	–	2	–	0	7	–	3	–	0
Temple	2	–	2	–	0	4	–	6	–	0
Hofstra	1	–	3	–	0	5	–	5	–	0
Gettysburg	1	–	4	–	0	1	–	8	–	0
West Chester *	0	–	1	–	0	5	–	3	–	0
Northern College Division
Albright x	7	–	0	–	0	8	–	1	–	0
No. T–19 Wilkes x	6	–	0	–	0	8	–	0	–	0
Delaware Valley	5	–	2	–	0	6	–	2	–	0
Juniata	4	–	2	–	0	7	–	2	–	0
Upsala	3	–	4	–	0	4	–	4	–	0
Moravian	3	–	6	–	0	3	–	6	–	0
Susquehanna	1	–	5	–	0	2	–	6	–	1
Lycoming	1	–	7	–	0	1	–	7	–	0
Wagner *	3	–	1	–	0	3	–	6	–	0
Southern College Division
Franklin & Marshall x	6	–	1	–	0	6	–	2	–	0
Johns Hopkins x	6	–	1	–	0	7	–	2	–	0
Muhlenberg	6	–	3	–	0	6	–	3	–	0
Western Maryland	3	–	3	–	0	5	–	4	–	0
Lebanon Valley	4	–	4	–	0	4	–	4	–	0
Ursinus	3	–	5	–	0	3	–	5	–	0
Pennsylvania Military	2	–	5	–	0	2	–	7	–	0
Haverford	1	–	6	–	0	1	–	6	–	0
Swarthmore	1	–	6	–	0	1	–	7	–	0
Dickinson	1	–	7	–	0	1	–	7	–	0
Drexel *	3	–	1	–	0	4	–	4	–	0
x – Division champion/co-champions; * – Ineligible for championship due to insufficient conference games; Rankings from AP small college poll

The 1968 Delaware Fightin' Blue Hens football team was an American football team that represented the University of Delaware in the Middle Atlantic Conference during the 1968 NCAA College Division football season. In its third season under head coach Tubby Raymond, the team compiled an 8–3 record (5–0 against MAC opponents), won the MAC University Division championship, defeated IUP in the Boardwalk Bowl, and outscored all opponents by a total of 319 to 180. Bob Novotny was the team captain. The team played its home games at Delaware Stadium in Newark, Delaware.

== Schedule ==
Date	Opponent	Site	Result	Attendance	Source
September 21	Hofstra	Delaware Stadium; Newark, DE	W 35–0	10,840	
September 28	at Villanova*	Villanova Stadium; Villanova, PA (rivalry)	L 0–16	12,025	
October 5	UMass*	Delaware Stadium; Newark, DE	W 28–23	13,261	
October 12	at Buffalo*	Rotary Field; Buffalo, NY	L 17–29	7,500–8,536	
October 19	West Chester	Delaware Stadium; Newark, DE (rivalry)	W 28–0	8,677	
October 26	at Temple	Temple Stadium; Philadelphia, PA	W 50–27	7,500	
November 2	at Rutgers*	Rutgers Stadium; Piscataway, NJ	L 14–23	18,000	
November 9	at Lehigh	Taylor Stadium; Bethlehem, PA (rivalry)	W 37–13	9,000	
November 16	Boston University*	Delaware Stadium; Newark, DE	W 41–13	10,350	
November 23	Bucknell	Delaware Stadium; Newark, DE	W 38–12	10,924	
December 14	vs. IUP*	Atlantic City Convention Center; Atlantic City, NJ (Boardwalk Bowl)	W 31–24	9,849	
*Non-conference game
