= 1968 Princeton Tigers football team =

American college football season

1968 Princeton Tigers football
- Conference: Ivy League
- Record: 4–5 (4–3 Ivy)
- Head coach: Dick Colman (12th season)
- Captain: Richard R. Bracken
- Home stadium: Palmer Stadium

1968 Ivy League football standings
| | Conf. | | | | | Overall |
| Team | W | | L | | T | W | | L | | T |
|---|---|---|---|---|---|---|---|---|---|---|
| Harvard + | 6 | – | 0 | – | 1 | 8 | – | 0 | – | 1 |
| Yale + | 6 | – | 0 | – | 1 | 8 | – | 0 | – | 1 |
| Penn | 5 | – | 2 | – | 0 | 7 | – | 2 | – | 0 |
| Princeton | 4 | – | 3 | – | 0 | 4 | – | 5 | – | 0 |
| Dartmouth | 3 | – | 4 | – | 0 | 4 | – | 5 | – | 0 |
| Columbia | 2 | – | 5 | – | 0 | 2 | – | 7 | – | 0 |
| Cornell | 1 | – | 6 | – | 0 | 3 | – | 6 | – | 0 |
| Brown | 0 | – | 7 | – | 0 | 2 | – | 7 | – | 0 |
+ – Conference co-champions

The 1968 Princeton Tigers football team was an American football team that represented Princeton University during the 1968 NCAA University Division football season. Princeton finished fourth in the Ivy League.

In their 12th and final year under head coach Dick Colman, the Tigers compiled a 4–5 record and outscored opponents 228 to 149. Richard R. Bracken was the team captain.

Princeton's 4–3 conference record placed fourth in the Ivy League standings. The Tigers outscored Ivy opponents 207 to 115.

Princeton played its home games at Palmer Stadium on the university campus in Princeton, New Jersey.

== Schedule ==
| Date | Opponent | Site | Result | Attendance | Source |
|---|---|---|---|---|---|
| September 28 | Rutgers* | Palmer Stadium; Princeton, NJ (rivalry) | L 14–20 | 39,000 | |
| October 5 | Columbia | Palmer Stadium; Princeton, NJ | W 44–16 | 12,000 | |
| October 12 | at Dartmouth | Memorial Field; Hanover, NH | W 34–7 | 19,635 | |
| October 19 | Colgate* | Palmer Stadium; Princeton, NJ | L 7–14 | 10,000 | |
| October 26 | at Penn | Franklin Field; Philadelphia, PA (rivalry) | L 14–19 | 30,886 | |
| November 2 | at Brown | Brown Stadium; Providence, RI | W 50–7 | 15,600 | |
| November 9 | Harvard | Palmer Stadium; Princeton, NJ (rivalry) | L 7–9 | 36,000 | |
| November 16 | at Yale | Yale Bowl; New Haven, CT (rivalry) | L 17–42 | 52,510 | |
| November 23 | Cornell | Palmer Stadium; Princeton, NJ | W 41–13 | 20,000 | |
*Non-conference game
