= 1968 Columbia Lions football team =

American college football season

1968 Columbia Lions football
- Conference: Ivy League
- Record: 2–7 (2–5 Ivy)
- Head coach: Frank Navarro (1st season)
- Home stadium: Baker Field

1968 Ivy League football standings
| | Conf. | | | | | Overall |
| Team | W | | L | | T | W | | L | | T |
|---|---|---|---|---|---|---|---|---|---|---|
| Harvard + | 6 | – | 0 | – | 1 | 8 | – | 0 | – | 1 |
| Yale + | 6 | – | 0 | – | 1 | 8 | – | 0 | – | 1 |
| Penn | 5 | – | 2 | – | 0 | 7 | – | 2 | – | 0 |
| Princeton | 4 | – | 3 | – | 0 | 4 | – | 5 | – | 0 |
| Dartmouth | 3 | – | 4 | – | 0 | 4 | – | 5 | – | 0 |
| Columbia | 2 | – | 5 | – | 0 | 2 | – | 7 | – | 0 |
| Cornell | 1 | – | 6 | – | 0 | 3 | – | 6 | – | 0 |
| Brown | 0 | – | 7 | – | 0 | 2 | – | 7 | – | 0 |
+ – Conference co-champions

The 1968 Columbia Lions football team represented Columbia University in the 1968 NCAA University Division football season. They were led by first-year head coach Frank Navarro and played their home games at Baker Field. They were a member of the Ivy League. They finished the season 2–7 overall and 2–5 in Ivy League play to place fifth.

== Schedule ==
| Date | Opponent | Site | Result | Attendance | Source |
|---|---|---|---|---|---|
| September 28 | Lafayette* | Baker Field; New York, NY | L 14–36 | 7,441 | |
| October 5 | at Princeton | Palmer Stadium; Princeton, NJ | L 16–44 | 12,000 | |
| October 12 | Harvard^{†} | Baker Field; New York, NY | L 14–21 | 17,182 | |
| October 19 | at Yale | Yale Bowl; New Haven, CT | L 7–29 | 17,724 | |
| October 26 | Rutgers* | Baker Field; New York, NY | L 17–28 | 10,968 | |
| November 2 | Cornell | Baker Field; New York, NY (rivalry) | W 34–25 | 14,377 | |
| November 9 | at Dartmouth | Memorial Field; Hanover, NH | L 19–31 | 8,444 | |
| November 16 | at Penn | Franklin Field; Philadelphia, PA | L 7–13 | 10,366 | |
| November 23 | Brown | Baker Field; New York, NY | W 46–20 | 9,723 | |
*Non-conference game; ^{†}Homecoming
