= 1968 Penn Quakers football team =

American college football season

1968 Penn Quakers football
- Conference: Ivy League
- Record: 7–2 (5–2 Ivy)
- Head coach: Bob Odell (4th season)
- Home stadium: Franklin Field

1968 Ivy League football standings
| | Conf. | | | | | Overall |
| Team | W | | L | | T | W | | L | | T |
|---|---|---|---|---|---|---|---|---|---|---|
| Harvard + | 6 | – | 0 | – | 1 | 8 | – | 0 | – | 1 |
| Yale + | 6 | – | 0 | – | 1 | 8 | – | 0 | – | 1 |
| Penn | 5 | – | 2 | – | 0 | 7 | – | 2 | – | 0 |
| Princeton | 4 | – | 3 | – | 0 | 4 | – | 5 | – | 0 |
| Dartmouth | 3 | – | 4 | – | 0 | 4 | – | 5 | – | 0 |
| Columbia | 2 | – | 5 | – | 0 | 2 | – | 7 | – | 0 |
| Cornell | 1 | – | 6 | – | 0 | 3 | – | 6 | – | 0 |
| Brown | 0 | – | 7 | – | 0 | 2 | – | 7 | – | 0 |
+ – Conference co-champions

The 1968 Penn Quakers football team represented the University of Pennsylvania as a member of the Ivy League during the 1968 NCAA University Division football season. Led by fourth-year head coach Bob Odell, the Quakers compiled an overall record of 7–2 with a mark of 5–2 in conference play, placing third in the Ivy League. Penn played home games at Franklin Field on the university's campus in Philadelphia.

== Schedule ==
| Date | Opponent | Site | Result | Attendance | Source |
|---|---|---|---|---|---|
| September 28 | Bucknell* | Franklin Field; Philadelphia, PA | W 27–10 | 12,303 | |
| October 5 | at Brown | Brown Stadium; Providence, RI | W 17–13 | 8,400 | |
| October 12 | at Cornell | Schoellkopf Field; Ithaca, NY (rivalry) | W 10–8 | 16,000 | |
| October 19 | Lehigh* | Franklin Field; Philadelphia, PA | W 34–0 | 8,916 | |
| October 26 | Princeton | Franklin Field; Philadelphia, PA (rivalry) | W 19–14 | 30,886 | |
| November 2 | at Harvard | Harvard Stadium; Boston, MA (rivalry) | L 6–28 | 25,000 | |
| November 9 | Yale | Franklin Field; Philadelphia, PA | L 13–30 | 28,839 | |
| November 16 | Columbia | Franklin Field; Philadelphia, PA | W 13–7 | 10,366 | |
| November 23 | Dartmouth | Franklin Field; Philadelphia, PA | W 26–21 | 50,188 | |
*Non-conference game
