= 1968 Cornell Big Red football team =

American college football season

1968 Cornell Big Red football
- Conference: Ivy League
- Record: 3–6 (1–6 Ivy)
- Head coach: Jack Musick (3rd season)
- Captain: Doug Kleiber
- Home stadium: Schoellkopf Field

1968 Ivy League football standings
	Conf.					Overall
Team	W		L		T	W		L		T
Harvard +	6	–	0	–	1	8	–	0	–	1
Yale +	6	–	0	–	1	8	–	0	–	1
Penn	5	–	2	–	0	7	–	2	–	0
Princeton	4	–	3	–	0	4	–	5	–	0
Dartmouth	3	–	4	–	0	4	–	5	–	0
Columbia	2	–	5	–	0	2	–	7	–	0
Cornell	1	–	6	–	0	3	–	6	–	0
Brown	0	–	7	–	0	2	–	7	–	0
+ – Conference co-champions

The 1968 Cornell Big Red football team was an American football team that represented Cornell University during the 1968 NCAA University Division football season. Cornell finished second-from-last in the Ivy League.

In its third season under head coach Jack Musick, the team compiled a 3–6 record and was outscored 163 to 130. Doug Kleiber was the team captain.

Cornell's 1–6 conference record placed seventh in the Ivy League standings. The Big Red was outscored 147 to 96 by Ivy opponents.

Cornell played its home games at Schoellkopf Field in Ithaca, New York.

== Schedule ==
Date	Opponent	Site	Result	Attendance	Source
September 28	Colgate*	Schoellkopf Field; Ithaca, NY (rivalry)	W 17–0	18,000	
October 5	Rutgers*	Schoellkopf Field; Ithaca, NY	W 17–16	15,000	
October 12	Penn	Schoellkopf Field; Ithaca, NY (rivalry)	L 8–10	16,000	
October 19	at Harvard	Harvard Stadium; Boston, MA	L 0–10	15,000	
October 26	Yale	Schoellkopf Field; Ithaca, NY	L 13–25	20,000	
November 2	at Columbia	Baker Field; New York, NY (rivalry)	L 25–34	14,377	
November 9	at Brown	Brown Stadium; Providence, RI	W 31–0	5,000	
November 16	Dartmouth	Schoellkopf Field; Ithaca, NY (rivalry)	L 6–27	15,000	
November 23	at Princeton	Palmer Stadium; Princeton, NJ	L 13–41	20,000	
*Non-conference game
