= 1968 Bowling Green Falcons football team =

American college football season

1968 Bowling Green Falcons football
- Conference: Mid-American Conference
- Record: 6–3–1 (3–2–1 MAC)
- Head coach: Don Nehlen (1st season)
- Home stadium: Doyt Perry Stadium

1968 Mid-American Conference football standings
	Conf.					Overall
Team	W		L		T	W		L		T
No. 20 Ohio $	6	–	0	–	0	10	–	1	–	0
Miami (OH)	5	–	1	–	0	7	–	3	–	0
Bowling Green	3	–	2	–	1	6	–	3	–	1
Toledo	3	–	2	–	1	5	–	4	–	1
Western Michigan	2	–	4	–	0	3	–	6	–	0
Kent State	1	–	5	–	0	1	–	9	–	0
Marshall	0	–	6	–	0	0	–	9	–	1
$ – Conference champion; Rankings from AP Poll

The 1968 Bowling Green Falcons football team was an American football team that represented Bowling Green State University in the Mid-American Conference (MAC) during the 1968 NCAA University Division football season. In their first season under head coach Don Nehlen, the Falcons compiled a 6–3–1 record (3–2–1 against MAC opponents), finished in third place in the MAC, and outscored opponents by a combined total of 267 to 147.

The team's statistical leaders included P.J. Nyitray with 898 passing yards, Fred Mathews with 733 rushing yards, and Eddie Jones with 716 receiving yards.

== Schedule ==
Date	Opponent	Site	Result	Attendance	Source
September 21	Ball State*	Doyt Perry Stadium; Bowling Green, OH	W 62–8	16,129	
September 28	Dayton*	Doyt Perry Stadium; Bowling Green, OH	W 20–14	14,700	
October 5	at Western Michigan	Waldo Stadium; Kalamazoo, MI	W 17–10	19,200	
October 12	at Toledo	Glass Bowl; Toledo, OH (rivalry)	T 0–0	18,236	
October 19	Kent State^{†}	Doyt Perry Stadium; Bowling Green, OH (rivalry)	W 30–7	16,214	
October 26	at Miami (OH)	Miami Field; Oxford, OH	L 7–31	10,722	
November 2	Marshall	Doyt Perry Stadium; Bowling Green, OH	W 54–28	13,800	
November 9	No. 16 Ohio	Doyt Perry Stadium; Bowling Green, OH	L 27–28	15,223	
November 16	at Northern Illinois*	Huskie Stadium; DeKalb, IL	L 6–7	8,700–8,800	
November 23	at Xavier*	Xavier Stadium; Cincinnati, OH	W 44–14	9,681	
*Non-conference game; ^{†}Homecoming; Rankings from AP Poll released prior to the game
