= 1968 Vermont Catamounts football team =

American college football season

1968 Vermont Catamounts football
- Conference: Yankee Conference
- Record: 3–6 (1–4 Yankee)
- Head coach: Bob Clifford (7th season)
- Home stadium: Centennial Field

1968 Yankee Conference football standings
	Conf.					Overall
Team	W		L		T	W		L		T
New Hampshire +	4	–	1	–	0	6	–	2	–	0
Connecticut +	4	–	1	–	0	4	–	6	–	0
Maine	2	–	3	–	0	3	–	5	–	0
Rhode Island	2	–	3	–	0	3	–	6	–	0
UMass	2	–	3	–	0	2	–	8	–	0
Vermont	1	–	4	–	0	3	–	6	–	0
+ – Conference co-champions

The 1968 Vermont Catamounts football team was an American football team that represented the University of Vermont in the Yankee Conference during the 1968 NCAA College Division football season. In their seventh year under head coach Bob Clifford, the team compiled a 3–6 record. Of note, this would be the last season in the run of UVM football from the late nineteenth century to 1974 that in-state rivals Middlebury and Norwich would both play the Catamounts. Norwich would play them one more time in 1974.

== Schedule ==
Date	Opponent	Site	Result	Attendance	Source
September 21	at Connecticut	Memorial Stadium; Storrs, CT	L 0–21	7,819–8,000	
September 28	Wilkes*	Centennial Field; Burlington, VT	L 9–31	3,500–,000	
October 5	at Maine	Alumni Field; Orono, ME	L 0–28	5,400	
October 12	at Rhode Island	Meade Stadium; Kingston, RI	L 10–52	10,600–12,000	
October 19	New Hampshire^{†}	Centennial Field; Burlington, VT	W 12–10	3,500	
October 26	at Norwich*	Sabine Field; Northfield, VT	W 20–7	4,500	
November 2	UMass	Centennial Field; Burlington, VT	L 0–49	3,500–4,500	
November 9	Middlebury*	Centennial Field; Burlington, VT	W 45–18	4,000	
November 16	at C. W. Post*	Brookville, NY	L 10–25	2,500	
*Non-conference game; ^{†}Homecoming
