= 1968 Ohio Bobcats football team =

American college football season

1968 Ohio Bobcats football

MAC champion

Tangerine Bowl, L 42–49 vs. Richmond
- Conference: Mid-American Conference

Ranking
- Coaches: No. 18
- AP: No. 20
- Record: 10–1 (6–0 MAC)
- Head coach: Bill Hess (11th season)
- Home stadium: Peden Stadium

1968 Mid-American Conference football standings
	Conf.					Overall
Team	W		L		T	W		L		T
No. 20 Ohio $	6	–	0	–	0	10	–	1	–	0
Miami (OH)	5	–	1	–	0	7	–	3	–	0
Bowling Green	3	–	2	–	1	6	–	3	–	1
Toledo	3	–	2	–	1	5	–	4	–	1
Western Michigan	2	–	4	–	0	3	–	6	–	0
Kent State	1	–	5	–	0	1	–	9	–	0
Marshall	0	–	6	–	0	0	–	9	–	1
$ – Conference champion; Rankings from AP Poll

The 1968 Ohio Bobcats football team was an American football team that represented Ohio University during the 1968 NCAA University Division football season. In their 11th season under head coach Bill Hess, the Bobcats won the Mid-American Conference (MAC) championship, compiled a 10–1 record (6–0 against MAC opponents), and outscored all opponents by a combined total of 418 to 228. The team was undefeated in the regular season but lost to Richmond in the 1968 Tangerine Bowl. They played their home games in Peden Stadium in Athens, Ohio.

The team's statistical leaders included quarterback Cleve Bryant with 1,524 passing yards and 734 rushing yards, Dave LeVeck with 850 rushing yards, and Todd Snyder with 777 receiving yards.

== Schedule ==
Date	Opponent	Rank	Site	Result	Attendance	Source
September 21	Marshall		Peden Stadium; Athens, OH (rivalry)	W 48–8	14,702	
September 28	at Kent State		Memorial Stadium; Kent, OH	W 31–7	15,000	
October 5	Toledo		Peden Stadium; Athens, OH	W 40–31	17,607	
October 12	at William & Mary*		Cary Field; Williamsburg, VA	W 41–0	12,500	
October 19	Miami (OH)		Peden Stadium; Athens, OH (rivalry)	W 24–7	20,451	
October 26	Dayton*		Peden Stadium; Athens, OH	W 42–12	19,732	
November 2	at Western Michigan	No. 19	Waldo Stadium; Kalamazoo, MI	W 34–27	12,000	
November 9	at Bowling Green	No. 16	Doyt Perry Stadium; Bowling Green, OH	W 28–27	15,223	
November 16	at Cincinnati*	No. 17	Nippert Stadium; Cincinnati, OH	W 60–48	9,690	
November 23	Northern Illinois*	No. 17	Peden Stadium; Athens, OH	W 28–12	18,206	
December 27	vs. Richmond*	No. 15	Tangerine Bowl; Orlando, FL (Tangerine Bowl)	L 42–49	16,114	
*Non-conference game; Rankings from AP Poll released prior to the game
