= 1968 Dartmouth Indians football team =

American college football season

1968 Dartmouth Indians football
- Conference: Ivy League
- Record: 4–5 (3–4 Ivy)
- Head coach: Bob Blackman (14th season)
- Captain: Randolph Wallick
- Home stadium: Memorial Field

1968 Ivy League football standings
| | Conf. | | | | | Overall |
| Team | W | | L | | T | W | | L | | T |
|---|---|---|---|---|---|---|---|---|---|---|
| Harvard + | 6 | – | 0 | – | 1 | 8 | – | 0 | – | 1 |
| Yale + | 6 | – | 0 | – | 1 | 8 | – | 0 | – | 1 |
| Penn | 5 | – | 2 | – | 0 | 7 | – | 2 | – | 0 |
| Princeton | 4 | – | 3 | – | 0 | 4 | – | 5 | – | 0 |
| Dartmouth | 3 | – | 4 | – | 0 | 4 | – | 5 | – | 0 |
| Columbia | 2 | – | 5 | – | 0 | 2 | – | 7 | – | 0 |
| Cornell | 1 | – | 6 | – | 0 | 3 | – | 6 | – | 0 |
| Brown | 0 | – | 7 | – | 0 | 2 | – | 7 | – | 0 |
+ – Conference co-champions

The 1968 Dartmouth Indians football team was an American football team that represented Dartmouth College during the 1968 NCAA University Division football season. The Indians finished fifth in the Ivy League.

In their 14th season under head coach Bob Blackman, the Indians compiled a 4–5 record but outscored opponents 206 to 183. Randolph Wallick was the team captain.

The Indians' 3–4 conference record placed fifth in the Ivy League standings. The Indians outscored Ivy opponents 168 to 154.

Dartmouth played its home games at Memorial Field on the college campus in Hanover, New Hampshire.

== Schedule ==
| Date | Opponent | Site | Result | Attendance | Source |
|---|---|---|---|---|---|
| September 28 | New Hampshire* | Memorial Field; Hanover, NH (rivalry) | W 21–0 | 11,745–11,785 | |
| October 5 | at Holy Cross* | Fitton Field; Worcester, MA | L 17–29 | 16,500 | |
| October 12 | Princeton | Memorial Field; Hanover, NH | L 7–34 | 19,635 | |
| October 19 | Brown | Memorial Field; Hanover, NH | W 48–0 | 8,313 | |
| October 26 | at Harvard | Harvard Stadium; Boston, MA (rivalry) | L 7–22 | 39,000 | |
| November 2 | at Yale | Yale Bowl; New Haven, CT | L 27–47 | 50,304 | |
| November 9 | Columbia | Memorial Field; Hanover, NH | W 31–19 | 8,444 | |
| November 16 | at Cornell | Schoellkopf Field; Ithaca, NY (rivalry) | W 27–6 | 15,000 | |
| November 23 | at Penn | Franklin Field; Philadelphia, PA | L 21–26 | 50,188 | |
*Non-conference game
