= 1968 Yale Bulldogs football team =

American college football season

1968 Yale Bulldogs football

Ivy League champion
- Conference: Ivy League
- Record: 8–0–1 (6–0–1 Ivy)
- Head coach: Carmen Cozza (4th season)
- Home stadium: Yale Bowl

1968 Ivy League football standings
	Conf.					Overall
Team	W		L		T	W		L		T
Harvard +	6	–	0	–	1	8	–	0	–	1
Yale +	6	–	0	–	1	8	–	0	–	1
Penn	5	–	2	–	0	7	–	2	–	0
Princeton	4	–	3	–	0	4	–	5	–	0
Dartmouth	3	–	4	–	0	4	–	5	–	0
Columbia	2	–	5	–	0	2	–	7	–	0
Cornell	1	–	6	–	0	3	–	6	–	0
Brown	0	–	7	–	0	2	–	7	–	0
+ – Conference co-champions

The 1968 Yale Bulldogs football team represented Yale University in the 1968 NCAA University Division football season. The Bulldogs were led by fourth-year head coach Carmen Cozza, played their home games at the Yale Bowl and finished tied for first in the Ivy League season with a 6–0–1 record, 8–0–1 overall. The season is notable for the final game against rival Harvard, which ended in a tie and resulted in the famous newspaper headline "Harvard Beats Yale 29–29".

== Schedule ==
Date	Opponent	Site	Result	Attendance	Source
September 28	Connecticut*	Yale Bowl; New Haven, CT	W 31–14	33,373	
October 5	Colgate*	Yale Bowl; New Haven, CT	W 49–14	29,107	
October 12	Brown	Yale Bowl; New Haven, CT	W 35–13	29,511	
October 19	Columbia	Yale Bowl; New Haven, CT	W 29–7	17,724	
October 26	at Cornell	Schoellkopf Field; Ithaca, NY	W 25–13	20,000	
November 2	Dartmouth	Yale Bowl; New Haven, CT	W 47–27	50,304	
November 9	at Penn	Franklin Field; Philadelphia, PA	W 30–13	28,839	
November 16	Princeton	Yale Bowl; New Haven, CT (rivalry)	W 42–17	52,510	
November 23	at Harvard	Harvard Stadium; Boston, MA (The Game)	T 29–29	40,280	
*Non-conference game

== Roster ==
1968 Yale Bulldogs football team roster
Players
Coaches
Offense

Pos.	#	Name	Class
HB	44	Nick Davidson
QB	10	Brian Dowling (C)	Sr
OT	70	Kyle Gee	Sr
RB	30	Calvin Hill	Sr
G	60	Brad Lee
FB	41	Bob Levin	Sr
WR	88	Pat Madden	Sr
TE	91	Del Marting
C	50	Fred Morris	Sr
TE	89	Bruce Weinstein	Sr

Defense

Pos.	#	Name	Class
LB	27	Mike Bouscaren (C)	Sr
DE	77	Fran Gallagher
DE	84	Jim Gallagher	So
S	12	J. P. Goldsmith	Sr
DB	40	Ron Kell
MG	61	Mick Kleber
DB	45	Don Martin	So
DB	24	John Waldman
MG	63	Dick Williams

Special teams

Pos.	#	Name	Class
K	19	Bayless

Head coach

- Carmen Cozza

Coordinators/assistant coaches

Legend

- (C) Team captain
- (S) Suspended
- (I) Ineligible
- Injured
- Redshirt

== NFL draft ==
The following Bulldogs were selected in the National Football League draft following the season.

Round	Pick	Player	Position	NFL team
1	24	Calvin Hill	RB	Dallas Cowboys
8	193	Bruce Weinstein	TE	Miami Dolphins
11	277	Brian Dowling	QB	Minnesota Vikings
