= 1968 Kent State Golden Flashes football team =

American college football season

1968 Kent State Golden Flashes football
- Conference: Mid-American Conference
- Record: 1–9 (1–5 MAC)
- Head coach: Dave Puddington (1st season)
- Home stadium: Memorial Stadium

1968 Mid-American Conference football standings
	Conf.					Overall
Team	W		L		T	W		L		T
No. 20 Ohio $	6	–	0	–	0	10	–	1	–	0
Miami (OH)	5	–	1	–	0	7	–	3	–	0
Bowling Green	3	–	2	–	1	6	–	3	–	1
Toledo	3	–	2	–	1	5	–	4	–	1
Western Michigan	2	–	4	–	0	3	–	6	–	0
Kent State	1	–	5	–	0	1	–	9	–	0
Marshall	0	–	6	–	0	0	–	9	–	1
$ – Conference champion; Rankings from AP Poll

The 1968 Kent State Golden Flashes football team was an American football team that represented Kent State University in the Mid-American Conference (MAC) during the 1968 NCAA University Division football season. In their first season under head coach Dave Puddington, the Golden Flashes compiled a 1–9 record (1–5 against MAC opponents), finished in sixth place in the MAC, and were outscored by all opponents by a combined total of 230 to 101.

The team's statistical leaders included Don Nottingham with 727 rushing yards, Steve Trustdorf with 773 passing yards, and Doug Smith with 247 receiving yards. Defensive tackle Jim Corrigall was selected as a first-team All-MAC player.

Puddington was hired as Kent State's head football coach in December 1967. He had been the head football coach at Washington University in St. Louis from 1962 to 1967.

== Schedule ==
Date	Opponent	Site	Result	Attendance	Source
September 14	at Dayton*	Baujan Field; Dayton, OH	L 10–24	13,888	
September 21	Buffalo*	Memorial Stadium; Kent, OH	L 13–21	16,488	
September 28	Ohio	Memorial Stadium; Kent, OH	L 7–31	15,000	
October 5	at Miami (OH)	Miami Field; Oxford, OH	L 0–24	14,622	
October 12	Western Michigan	Memorial Stadium; Kent, OH	L 0–14	9,000	
October 19	at Bowling Green	Doyt Perry Stadium; Bowling Green, OH (rivalry)	L 7–30	16,214	
October 26	Toledo	Memorial Stadium; Kent, OH	L 12–28	14,500	
November 2	at Louisville*	Fairgrounds Stadium; Louisville, KY	L 9–23	8,000	
November 9	at Marshall	Fairfield Stadium; Huntington, WV	W 36–12	5,000	
November 16	Xavier*	Memorial Stadium; Kent, OH	L 7–23		
*Non-conference game
