= Tom Boisture =

American football coach, scout, and executive (1931–2011)

Biographical details
- Born: March 23, 1931; Detroit, Michigan, U.S.
- Died: March 11, 2011 (aged 79); Little Ferry, New Jersey, U.S.

Playing career
- 1952–1954: Mississippi State
- Position: Guard

Coaching career (HC unless noted)
- 1955: Austin Catholic Prep (MI)
- 1956–1961: St. Ambrose HS (MI)
- 1962–1965: Houston (assistant)
- 1966: Holy Cross (assistant)
- 1967–1968: Holy Cross
- 1969: Tulsa (assistant)

Administrative career (AD unless noted)
- 1970–1979: New England Patriots (scout)
- 1980–1998: New York Giants (DPP)
- 1998–2000: New York Giants (VPPP)

Head coaching record
- Overall: 8–11–1 (college)

Thomas Cassidy Boisture Sr. (March 23, 1931 – March 11, 2011) was an American football high school and college coach, a National Football League (NFL) scout, and the head of player personnel for the New York Giants.

Before joining the Giants, Boisture was a scout for the New England Patriots from 1970 to 1979. He became the director of player personnel for the New York Giants in 1980 and was named vice president of player personnel in 1998. He retired in 2000.

== Early years ==
Boisture was a star football player at Holy Redeemer High School in Detroit. He went on to play college football at Mississippi State University.

== Coaching career ==
Boisture began his coaching career at Austin Catholic Preparatory School in Detroit before becoming the head football coach at St. Ambrose High School in Grosse Pointe Park, Michigan.

Boisture then became an assistant coach at the University of Tulsa and then at the University of Houston. He was the head football coach at the College of the Holy Cross from 1967 to 1968, compiling an 8–11–1 record as head coach.

== Scouting and executive career ==
Boisture was a member of the 1986 Super Bowl and 1990 Super Bowl winning Giants. Lawrence Taylor, Mark Bavaro, Carl Banks, Michael Strahan and Amani Toomer were among the players who helped the Giants reach four Super Bowls during Boisture's tenure.

== Personal life ==
Boisture was the younger brother of Dan Boisture, who served as head football coach at Eastern Michigan University from 1967 to 1973. A resident of Little Ferry, New Jersey, Boisture died of myelofibrosis on March 11, 2011.

== Head coaching record ==
=== College ===
Year	Team	Overall	Conference	Standing	Bowl/playoffs
Holy Cross Crusaders (NCAA University Division independent) (1967–1968)
1967	Holy Cross	5–5			
1968	Holy Cross	3–6–1			
Holy Cross:		8–11–1			
Total:		8–11–1			
