= 1968 New Hampshire Wildcats football team =

American college football season

1968 New Hampshire Wildcats football

Yankee co-champion
- Conference: Yankee Conference
- Record: 6–2 (4–1 Yankee)
- Head coach: Jim Root (1st season)
- Offensive coordinator: Paul Schudel (1st season)
- Home stadium: Cowell Stadium

1968 Yankee Conference football standings
	Conf.					Overall
Team	W		L		T	W		L		T
New Hampshire +	4	–	1	–	0	6	–	2	–	0
Connecticut +	4	–	1	–	0	4	–	6	–	0
Maine	2	–	3	–	0	3	–	5	–	0
Rhode Island	2	–	3	–	0	3	–	6	–	0
UMass	2	–	3	–	0	2	–	8	–	0
Vermont	1	–	4	–	0	3	–	6	–	0
+ – Conference co-champions

The 1968 New Hampshire Wildcats football team was an American football team that represented the University of New Hampshire as a member of the Yankee Conference during the 1968 NCAA College Division football season. In its first year under head coach Jim Root, the team compiled a 6–2 record (4–1 against conference opponents) and tied for the Yankee Conference championship.

== Schedule ==
Date	Opponent	Site	Result	Attendance	Source
September 28	at Dartmouth*	Memorial Field; Hanover, NH (rivalry)	L 0–21	11,745–11,785	
October 5	Connecticut	Cowell Stadium; Durham, NH	W 17–10	8,500	
October 12	Maine	Cowell Stadium; Durham, NH (Battle for the Brice–Cowell Musket)	W 42–17	13,000–13,050	
October 19	at Vermont	Centennial Field; Burlington, VT	L 10–12	3,500	
October 26	at Northeastern*	Parsons Field; Brookline, MA	W 26–3	5,605	
November 2	Rhode Island	Cowell Stadium; Durham, NH	W 27–6	8,133	
November 9	Springfield*	Cowell Stadium; Durham, NH	W 17–10	7,568	
November 16	at UMass	Alumni Stadium; Hadley, MA (rivalry)	W 16–0	8,000	
*Non-conference game
