= 1968 Marshall Thundering Herd football team =

American college football season

1968 Marshall Thundering Herd football
- Conference: Mid-American Conference
- Record: 0–9–1 (0–6 MAC)
- Head coach: Perry Moss (1st season)
- Home stadium: Fairfield Stadium

1968 Mid-American Conference football standings
	Conf.					Overall
Team	W		L		T	W		L		T
No. 20 Ohio $	6	–	0	–	0	10	–	1	–	0
Miami (OH)	5	–	1	–	0	7	–	3	–	0
Bowling Green	3	–	2	–	1	6	–	3	–	1
Toledo	3	–	2	–	1	5	–	4	–	1
Western Michigan	2	–	4	–	0	3	–	6	–	0
Kent State	1	–	5	–	0	1	–	9	–	0
Marshall	0	–	6	–	0	0	–	9	–	1
$ – Conference champion; Rankings from AP Poll

The 1968 Marshall Thundering Herd football team represented Marshall University as an independent during the 1968 NCAA University Division football season. The team was led by first-year coach Perry Moss, in his only season. They were outscored 129–358 by their opponents. The Thundering Herd finished the season 0–9–1 overall and 0–6 in MAC play to place last.

This marked Marshall's final season in the MAC as they were suspended indefinitely from the conference due to committing a number of recruiting violations. Marshall would rejoin the MAC in 1997.

== Schedule ==
Date	Opponent	Site	Result	Attendance	Source
September 14	Morehead State*	Fairfield Stadium; Huntington, WV	T 7–7	9,000	
September 21	at Ohio	Peden Stadium; Athens, OH (rivalry)	L 8–48	14,702	
September 28	at Toledo	Glass Bowl; Toledo, OH	L 12–35	15,231	
October 5	at Xavier*	Xavier Stadium; Cincinnati, OH	L 20–30	8,118	
October 12	Miami (OH)	Fairfield Stadium; Huntington, WV	L 0–46	6,000	
October 19	Louisville*	Fairfield Stadium; Huntington, WV	L 10–13	4,500	
October 26	Western Michigan^{†}	Fairfield Stadium; Huntington, WV	L 12–40	8,000	
November 2	at Bowling Green	Doyt Perry Stadium; Bowling Green, OH	L 28–54	13,800	
November 9	Kent State	Fairfield Stadium; Huntington, WV	L 12–36	5,000	
November 16	at East Carolina*	Ficklen Memorial Stadium; Greenville, NC (rivalry)	L 20–49	7,500	
*Non-conference game; ^{†}Homecoming
