= Bruce Van Ness =

American gridiron football player (1946–2007)

Profile
- Position: Defensive back

Personal information
- Born: March 9, 1946; Teaneck, New Jersey, U.S.
- Died: November 5, 2007 (aged 61); Greenville, South Carolina, U.S.
- Listed height: 6 ft 3 in (1.91 m)
- Listed weight: 230 lb (104 kg)

Career information
- High school: Proctor Academy (Andover, New Hampshire)
- College: Rutgers
- NFL draft: 1970: 5th round, 112 (By the Atlanta Falcons)th overall pick

Career history
- 1970–1971: Montreal Alouettes

Awards and highlights
- 1971 – East All Star: Grey Cup champion (1970)

Bruce Roy R .Van Ness (March 9, 1946 – November 5, 2007) was an American professional football player who played for the Montreal Alouettes of the Canadian Football League. He won the Grey Cup with them in 1970. He played college football at Rutgers University. In 2007, he died at a nursing home in South Carolina.
