= Tom Beer =

American football player (born 1944)

No. 85, 82, 68
- Positions: Tight end, Guard

Personal information
- Born: December 21, 1944 (age 81); Detroit, Michigan, U.S.
- Listed height: 6 ft 4 in (1.93 m)
- Listed weight: 235 lb (107 kg)

Career information
- High school: St. Ambrose (Grosse Pointe Park, Michigan)
- College: Detroit Mercy; Houston
- NFL draft: 1967: 2nd round, 32nd overall pick

Career history
- Denver Broncos (1967–1969); Boston/New England Patriots (1970–1972)

Career NFL/AFL statistics
- Receptions: 65
- Receiving yards: 1,012
- Touchdowns: 4
- Stats at Pro Football Reference

Thomas John Beer (born December 21, 1944) is an American football player who played at the University of Houston and professionally for the Denver Broncos of the American Football League (AFL) and the National Football League (NFL)'s Boston / New England Patriots.

== Playing career ==
Beer played as a tight end in 42 games for the Patriots over the 1970–1972 seasons. Beer had 25 receptions for 381 yards and three TD's. His longest reception was a 31-yard touchdown reception on October 24, 1971.

He also returned two kickoffs for a total of 19 yards. Beer returned a kickoff four yards to end the first half in the Patriots 31–21 loss to the New York Jets at Harvard Stadium on September 27, 1970. His longest kickoff return was 15 yards at the end of the first quarter in the Patriots 34–10 loss to the New York Jets at Shea Stadium on October 29, 1972.

Beer lateraled a kickoff to Carl Garrett, who took it 27 yards in the Boston Patriots 45–10 loss to the Buffalo Bills at Harvard Stadium on November 1, 1970. Later in the same game, he lateraled another kickoff to Garrett, who advanced it 15 yards.

Beer returned a fumbled punt return by Ike Hill five yards in the Patriots 38–33 win over the Buffalo Bills at Schaefer Stadium on November 14, 1971.

== Later life ==
Following his playing days, Thomas Beer co-wrote (with George Kimball) the 1974 memoir Sunday's Fools: Stomped, Tromped, Kicked and Chewed in the NFL, recounting the experience of playing for two of the worst franchises in pro football during his career.

Tom also was an executive for the New York Stars of the short-lived World Football League.

Tom is currently residing in New Jersey.

== See also ==
- List of American Football League players
