= 1968 Rutgers Scarlet Knights football team =

American college football season

1968 Rutgers Scarlet Knights football

Middle Three champion
- Conference: Middle Three Conference
- Record: 8–2 (2–0 Middle Three)
- Head coach: John F. Bateman (9th season)
- Home stadium: Rutgers Stadium

1968 Middle Three Conference football standings
	Conf.					Overall
Team	W		L		T	W		L		T
Rutgers $	2	–	0	–	0	8	–	2	–	0
Lehigh	1	–	1	–	0	3	–	7	–	0
Lafayette	0	–	2	–	0	7	–	3	–	0
$ – Conference champion

The 1968 Rutgers Scarlet Knights football team represented Rutgers University in the 1968 NCAA University Division football season. In their ninth season under head coach John F. Bateman, the Scarlet Knights compiled an 8–2 record with their sole losses coming against Army and Cornell. The team won the Middle Three Conference championship and outscored their opponents 276 to 182 . The team's statistical leaders included Rich Policastro with 994 passing yards, Bryant Mitchell with 1,204 rushing yards, and Bob Stonebraker with 448 receiving yards.

== Schedule ==
Date	Time	Opponent	Site	Result	Attendance	Source
September 21		Lafayette	Rutgers Stadium; Piscataway, NJ	W 37–7	15,000–16,000	
September 28		at Princeton*	Palmer Stadium; Princeton, NJ (rivalry)	W 20–14	39,000	
October 5		at Cornell*	Schoellkopf Field; Ithaca, NY	L 16–17	15,000	
October 12		at Lehigh	Taylor Stadium; Bethlehem, PA	W 29–26	9,300	
October 19	2:00 p.m.	Army*	Rutgers Stadium; Piscataway, NJ	L 0–24	28,000	
October 26		at Columbia*	Baker Field; New York, NY	W 28–17	10,968	
November 2		Delaware^{†}*	Rutgers Stadium; Piscataway, NJ	W 23–14	18,000	
November 9		Connecticut*	Rutgers Stadium; Piscataway, NJ	W 27–15	10,000	
November 16		Holy Cross*	Rutgers Stadium; Piscataway, NJ	W 41–14	11,000	
November 23		Colgate*	Rutgers Stadium; Piscataway, NJ	W 55–34	16,000	
*Non-conference game; ^{†}Homecoming; All times are in Eastern time

== Roster ==
1968 Rutgers Scarlet Knights football team roster
Players
Coaches
Offense

Pos.	#	Name	Class
WR	80	John Bauer	So
FB	22	Mel Brown	Sr
RB	23	Bryant Mitchell	Sr
QB	12	Rich Policastro	Jr
WR	84	Bob Stonebraker	Jr
QB	10	Bruce Van Ness	Jr
QB	15	Mike Yancheff	So
OT	71	Dave Zimmerman	Sr

Defense

Pos.	#	Name	Class
LB	68	Rich Bing	Sr
S	26	Sam Chapman	So
DT	66	Mo Hill	Sr
LB	32	Kevin O'Connor	So
DE	81	Mike Pellowski	So
LB	70	Lee Schneider	Jr
DE	88	Ed Schroeder	Jr
DB	31	Larry Walsh	So

Special teams

Pos.	#	Name	Class

Head coach

- John F. Bateman

Coordinators/assistant coaches

Legend

- (C) Team captain
- (S) Suspended
- (I) Ineligible
- Injured
- Redshirt
