= Chattahoochee Valley Railroad Trail =

Rail trail in Valley, Alabama, U.S.

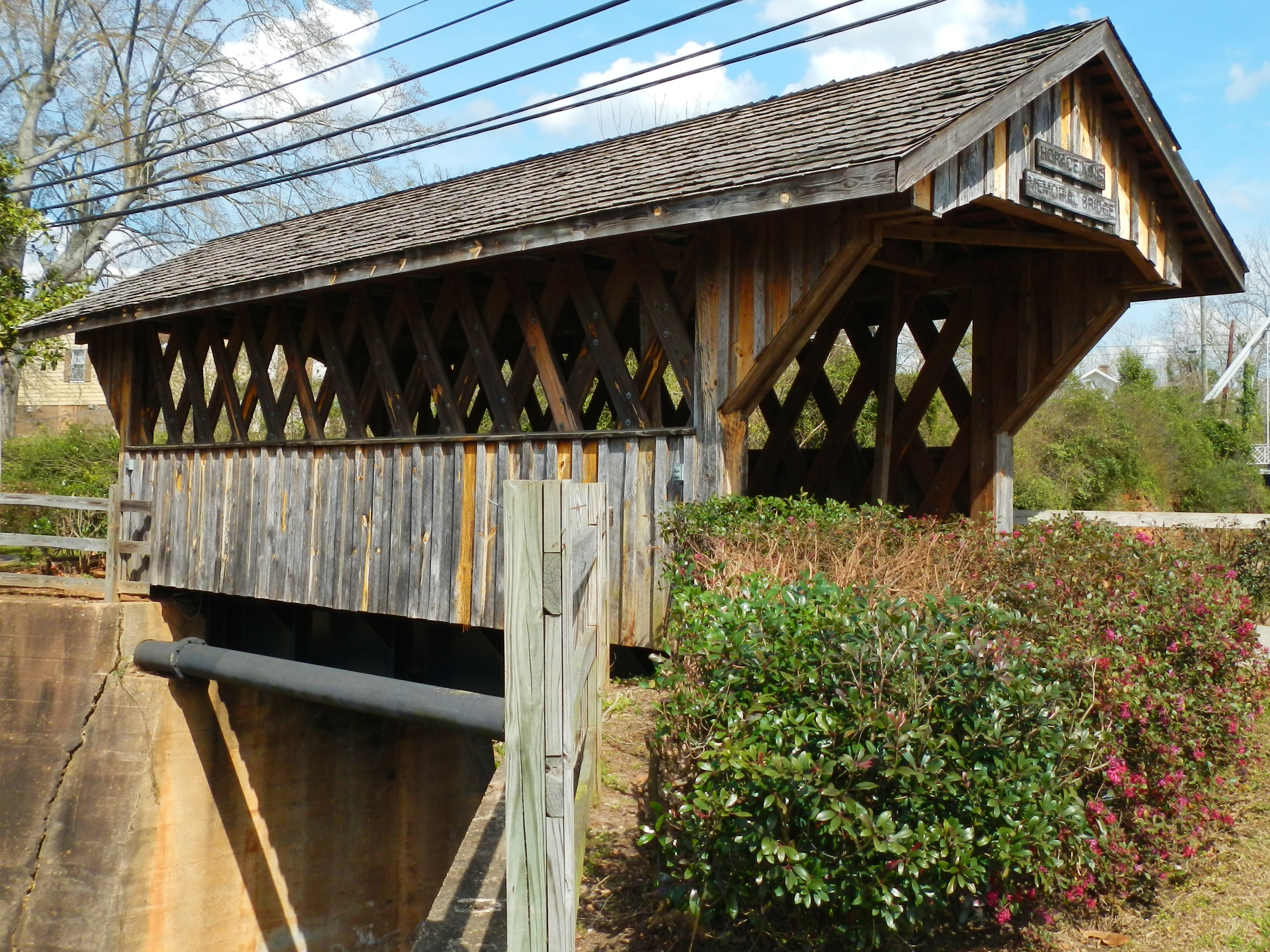
- The Horace King Memorial Bridge, a part of the trail
- Length: 7.5 miles (12.1 km)
- Location: Valley, Alabama
- Began construction: 1998
- Completed: 2000
- Designation: National Recreation Trail
- Trailheads: Shawmut Historic District; Riverview Historic District
- Use: Cycling, hiking, roller skating
- Highest point: 696 feet (212 m)
- Lowest point: 548 feet (167 m)
- Grade: 1%
- Maintained by: Valley Parks and Recreation
- Website: cityofvalley.com/recreation

The Chattahoochee Valley Railroad Trail, sometimes referred to as the CVRR Trail, is a 7.5-mile long asphalt-covered rail trail in Valley, Alabama. Made from a section of the defunct Chattahoochee Valley Railway, the trail runs through all four historic districts of the town (Fairfax, Langdale, Riverview, and Shawmut). These districts were formerly separate towns that were serviced by the railroad. These towns later combined to form the town of Valley in 1980.

Following the abandonment of the railroad in 1992, the town of Valley debated ways to reuse the stretch of railroad within its jurisdiction. The idea of converting it into a rail trail gained support from citizens and construction began in 1998. The trail was completed in 2000, with two sections, a northern and a southern, being connected by half-mile road and sidewalk link. Both the northern and southern section of the trail were designated as National Recreation Trails in 2011.

== History ==
The route was created as a portion of the Chattahoochee Valley Railway, which opened in January 1897. It started as a 10-mile route from West Point, Georgia, to the mill in Riverview, with stops in the other three mill villages—Shawmut, Langdale, and Fairfax. Expansions and abandonments happened during the railroad's history, but the stretch from Shawmut to Riverview remained intact. The entire railroad ceased operations in 1992, with less than ten miles of railroad in its possession.

Left with abandoned track throughout the relatively new city of Valley, which formed when the four mill villages combined in 1980, city council member Arnold Leak researched ways to reuse the trail. After a few unsuccessful attempts, Leak learned about ISTEA grants, which would provide funding to convert unused railways into rail trails. Enough support was garnered from citizens to acquire the right-of-way and to apply for the grants. Work began on the trail in 1998 and was completed in 2000.

The city of Valley received a grant from the Alabama Department of Economic and Community Affairs in 2009. The grant funded the addition of ten fiberglass markers along the trail. These were to be used as signs to point out historical sites along the trail's path. Both trail sections, northern and southern, were designated as National Recreation Trails in 2011.

== Route description ==
The trail starts in Shawmut with intervals of straight trail running through forested area. It then runs through Langdale, then Fairfax, then Riverview. Throughout the mill villages, the trail passes through town centers and through shops. The trail itself measures 96 inches in width and is paved primarily using asphalt, though concrete paving is also present. Due to its location near the Chattahoochee River, views of the river can often be obtained by pulling off the trail. Throughout the trail, the industrial architecture and vernacular mill houses that are common of Southern company towns are apparent.

Type of landmark	Coordinates	Location
Northern terminus	32°50′06″N 85°10′53″W	22nd Avenue in Shawmut
End of northern section	32°49′05″N 85°10′18″W	56th Street West in Langdale
Start of southern section	32°48′56″N 85°10′14″W	59th Street in Langdale
Fairfax Depot	32°47′41″N 85°10′53″W	Intersection of Railroad Street and River Road in Fairfax
Southern terminus	32°47′23″N 85°08′55″W	School Street in Riverview

=== Historic properties near the trail ===
There are about sixteen sites of historical significance located near the trail. Listed below is a selection of historical properties, which can all be reached either directly from the trail or by streets that connect to the trail.

==== Fairfax Depot ====
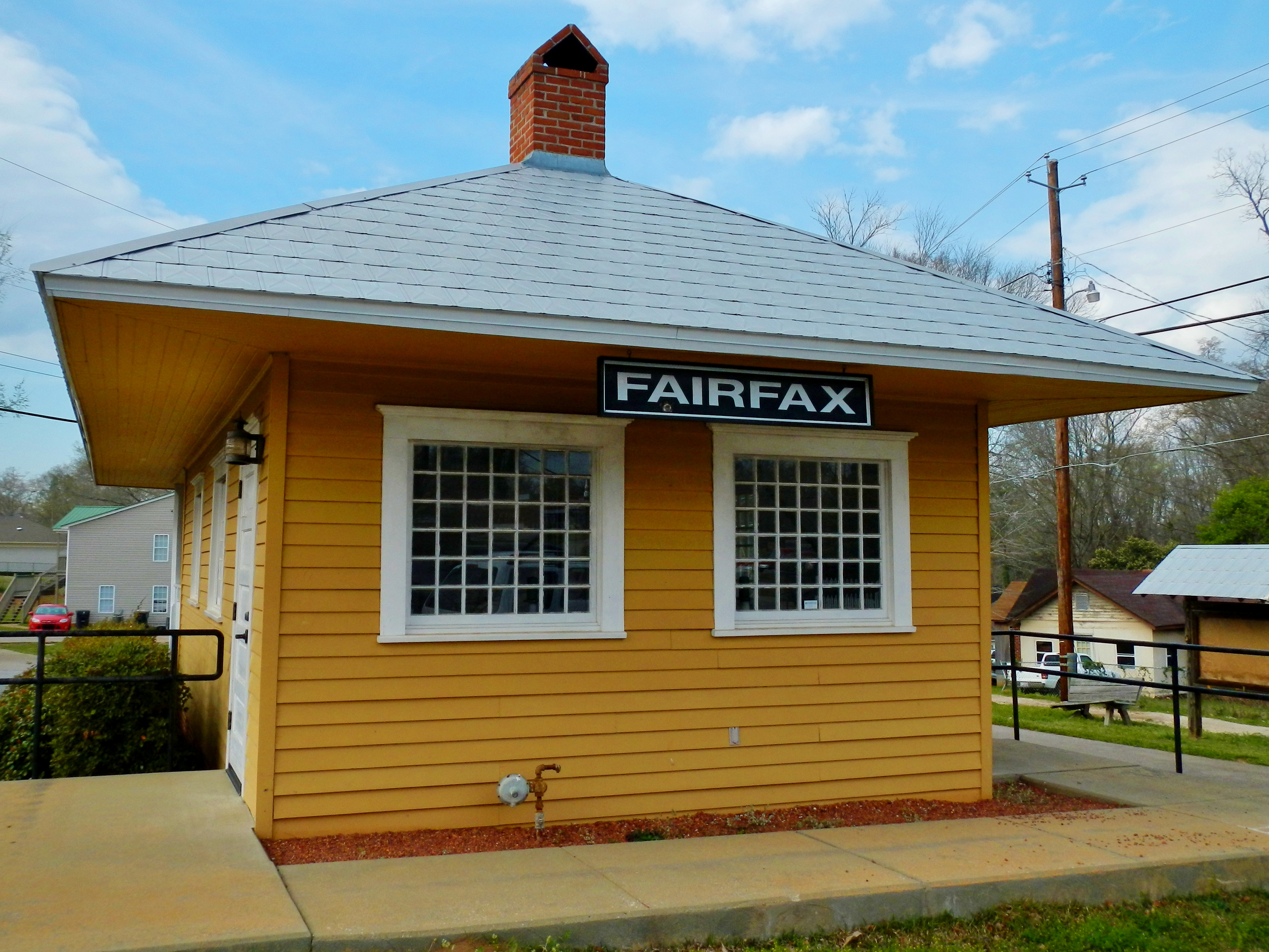
Fairfax Depot

The Fairfax Depot is one of the two surviving depots from when the railroad existed. Built in 1917, the depot now serves as a rest area and train museum.

==== Horace King Memorial Covered Bridge ====
The Horace King Memorial Covered Bridge, built in 2004, is a bridge that is built in the style of African-American architect Horace King, whose architectural skills earned him freedom from slavery. It is a replica of a larger bridge over the Chattahoochee River.
