= Dave Thompson (American football) =

American football player (born 1949)

No. 65
- Position: Offensive lineman

Personal information
- Born: February 1, 1949 (age 77); Langdale, Alabama, U.S.
- Listed height: 6 ft 4 in (1.93 m)
- Listed weight: 270 lb (122 kg)

Career information
- High school: Valley (Valley, Alabama)
- College: Clemson (1967–1970)
- NFL draft: 1971: 2nd round, 30th overall pick

Career history
- Detroit Lions (1971–1973); New Orleans Saints (1974–1975); Tampa Bay Buccaneers (1976)*; Washington Redskins (1976)*; Atlanta Falcons (1977)*
- * Offseason or practice squad member only

Awards and highlights
- Second-team All-American (1970); First-team All-ACC (1970)
- Stats at Pro Football Reference

David Wayne Thompson (born February 1, 1949) is an American former professional football player who was an offensive lineman for five seasons in the National Football League (NFL) with the Detroit Lions and New Orleans Saints. He was selected by the Lions in the second round of the 1971 NFL draft after playing college football for the Clemson Tigers.

== Early life and college ==
David Wayne Thompson was born on February 1, 1949, in Langdale, Alabama. He attended Valley High School in Valley, Alabama.

Thompson was a member of the Clemson Tigers from 1967 to 1970 and a three-year letterman from 1968 to 1970. As a senior in 1970, he earned Associated Press second-team All-American (AP) honors and AP first-team All-ACC honors.

== Professional career ==
Thompson was selected by the Detroit Lions in the second round, with the 30th overall pick, of the 1971 NFL draft. He played in all 14 games for the Lions in 1971, recovering one fumble. He appeared in seven games in 1972 and 14 games in 1973.

On January 29, 1974, Thompson and a 1974 first round draft pick were traded to the New Orleans Saints for a 1974 first round draft pick and a 1975 sixth round draft pick. He started all 14 games for the Saints during the 1974 season. The Saints finished the year with a 5–9 record. Thompson played in seven games, all starts, in 1975.

In March 1976, Thompson was selected by the Tampa Bay Buccaneers in the 1976 NFL expansion draft. On August 29, 1976, he was traded to the Washington Redskins for an undisclosed 1977 draft pick. He was waived by the Redskins on September 6, 1976.

Thompson signed with the Atlanta Falcons in 1977 but was later cut on August 10, 1977.
