= 1968 Duke Blue Devils football team =

American college football season

1968 Duke Blue Devils football
- Conference: Atlantic Coast Conference
- Record: 4–6 (3–4 ACC)
- Head coach: Tom Harp (3rd season)
- Offensive coordinator: Jacque Hetrick (3rd season)
- Defensive coordinator: George Hill (3rd season)
- MVP: Henley Carter
- Captain: J. B. Edwards
- Home stadium: Wallace Wade Stadium

1968 Atlantic Coast Conference football standings
	Conf.					Overall
Team	W		L		T	W		L		T
NC State $	6	–	1	–	0	6	–	4	–	0
Clemson	4	–	1	–	1	4	–	5	–	1
Virginia	4	–	2	–	0	7	–	3	–	0
South Carolina	4	–	3	–	0	4	–	6	–	0
Duke	3	–	4	–	0	4	–	6	–	0
Wake Forest	2	–	3	–	1	2	–	7	–	1
Maryland	2	–	5	–	0	2	–	8	–	0
North Carolina	1	–	6	–	0	3	–	7	–	0
$ – Conference champion; Virginia's game against Navy counted in the conference standings.

The 1968 Duke Blue Devils football team was an American football team that represented Duke University as a member of the Atlantic Coast Conference (ACC) during the 1968 NCAA University Division football season. In their third year under head coach Tom Harp, the Blue Devils compiled an overall record of 4–6, with a conference record of 3–4, and finished fifth in the ACC.

== Schedule ==
Date	Time	Opponent	Site	Result	Attendance	Source
September 21		at South Carolina	Carolina Stadium; Columbia, SC	W 14–7	42,234	
September 28		Michigan*	Wallace Wade Stadium; Durham, NC	L 10–31	25,000	
October 5		vs. Maryland	Foreman Field; Norfolk, VA (Oyster Bowl)	W 30–28	21,000	
October 12		Virginia^{†}	Wallace Wade Stadium; Durham, NC	L 20–50	22,000	
October 19		at Clemson	Memorial Stadium; Clemson, SC	L 22–39	28,509	
October 26	2:00 p.m.	at Army*	Michie Stadium; West Point, NY	L 25–57	32,000	
November 2		Georgia Tech*	Wallace Wade Stadium; Durham, NC	W 46–30	25,000	
November 9		NC State	Wallace Wade Stadium; Durham, NC (rivalry)	L 15–17	25,000	
November 16		Wake Forest	Wallace Wade Stadium; Durham, NC (rivalry)	W 18–3	17,500	
November 23		at North Carolina	Kenan Stadium; Chapel Hill, NC (Victory Bell)	L 14–25	44,500	
*Non-conference game; ^{†}Homecoming; All times are in Eastern time

== Roster ==
1968 Duke Blue Devils football team roster
Players
Coaches
Offense

Pos.	#	Name	Class
RB	35	Phil Asack	So
RB	36	Don Baglien	Jr
RB	20	Lloyd Bryant	So
RB	19	John Cappellano	So
WR	89	Henley Carter	Sr
WR	41	Wes Chesson	So
WR	86	Marcel Courtillet	Jr
TE	28	Jim Dearth	Jr
C	76	Gene DeBolt	Sr
G	60	J.B. Edwards	Sr
OT	62	Mike Gartner	So
QB	10	Leo Hart	So
WR	80	Bob Hepler	Jr
G	67	Ken Homa	Sr
OT	73	Guy Johnson	So
C	50	Bob Morris	Jr
G	66	Joe Newman	Jr
QB	16	Dave Trice	Jr

Defense

Pos.	#	Name	Class
LB	64	Dick Biddle	Jr
LB	34	Joe Compitello	Sr
S	15	Larry Davis	Sr
DB	12	Larry Dempsey	Sr
CB	14	Tom Edens	Sr
CB	23	Ed Hicklin	Sr
DT	72	Chris Hill	So
DE	88	George Joseph	Sr
DT	75	Frank Lilly	Sr
DB	27	Bill McKee	Jr
LB	37	Ed Newman	Sr
DE	85	Dan Rose	Sr
S	29	Phil Singer	So
LB	11	Mark Telge	Sr
DT	77	Fred Zirkle	Sr

Special teams

Pos.	#	Name	Class

Head coach

- Tom Harp

Coordinators/assistant coaches

Legend

- (C) Team captain
- (S) Suspended
- (I) Ineligible
- Injured
- Redshirt
