= 1968 South Carolina Gamecocks football team =

American college football season

1968 South Carolina Gamecocks football
- Conference: Atlantic Coast Conference
- Record: 4–6 (4–3 ACC)
- Head coach: Paul Dietzel (3rd season)
- Captains: Johnny Gregory; Benny Galloway
- Home stadium: Carolina Stadium

1968 Atlantic Coast Conference football standings
	Conf.					Overall
Team	W		L		T	W		L		T
NC State $	6	–	1	–	0	6	–	4	–	0
Clemson	4	–	1	–	1	4	–	5	–	1
Virginia	4	–	2	–	0	7	–	3	–	0
South Carolina	4	–	3	–	0	4	–	6	–	0
Duke	3	–	4	–	0	4	–	6	–	0
Wake Forest	2	–	3	–	1	2	–	7	–	1
Maryland	2	–	5	–	0	2	–	8	–	0
North Carolina	1	–	6	–	0	3	–	7	–	0
$ – Conference champion; Virginia's game against Navy counted in the conference standings.

The 1968 South Carolina Gamecocks football team represented the University of South Carolina as a member of the Atlantic Coast Conference (ACC) during the 1968 NCAA University Division football season. Led by third-year head coach Paul Dietzel, the Gamecocks compiled an overall record of 4–6 with a mark of 4–3 in conference play, placing fourth in the ACC. The team played home games at Carolina Stadium in Columbia, South Carolina.

The 1968 season remains the last in which South Carolina regularly wore helmets without a gamecock featured on them, instead featuring a garnet 'C'. The gamecock helmets had been worn in 1966 and 1967 and would be reinstated in 1969.

== Schedule ==
Date	Opponent	Site	Result	Attendance	Source
September 21	Duke	Carolina Stadium; Columbia, SC	L 7–14	42,234	
September 28	at North Carolina	Kenan Memorial Stadium; Chapel Hill, NC (rivalry)	W 32–27	28,000	
October 5	No. 16 Georgia*	Carolina Stadium; Columbia, SC (rivalry)	L 20–21	42,800	
October 12	at NC State	Carter Stadium; Raleigh, NC	L 12–36	33,400	
October 19	at Maryland	Byrd Stadium; College Park, MD	L 19–21	28,200	
October 26	No. 20 Florida State*	Carolina Stadium; Columbia, SC	L 28–35	42,038	
November 2	at Virginia	Scott Stadium; Charlottesville, VA	W 49–28	25,600	
November 9	at Wake Forest	Groves Stadium; Winston-Salem, NC	W 34–21	16,000	
November 16	Virginia Tech*	Carolina Stadium; Columbia, SC	L 6–17	40,137	
November 23	at Clemson	Memorial Stadium; Clemson, SC (rivalry)	W 7–3	53,247	
*Non-conference game; Rankings from AP Poll released prior to the game

== Roster ==
1968 South Carolina Gamecocks football team roster
Players
Coaches
Offense

Pos.	#	Name	Class
G	66	Chris Bank	So
G	63	Tom Beans	So
WR	90	Eddie Bolton	So
G	62	Don Buckner	Jr
OT	76	Dave DeCamilla	So
OT	73	Tony Fusaro	Jr
RB	20	Benny Galloway	Sr
WR	88	Johnny Gregory	Sr
TE	87	Doug Hamrick	So
QB	17	Dan Harbison	Jr
RB	24	Rudy Holloman	Jr
FB	23	Earl Hunter	Jr
OT	69	John King	Jr
C	74	Bob Mauro	Sr
FB	31	Bob Miranda	So
FB	36	Warren Muir	Jr
C	54	Ken Ross	Jr
TE	82	Gene Schwarting	Sr
QB	12	Tommy Suggs	So
FB	40	Tom Trevillian	So
RB	42	Ken Walkup	So
QB	16	Randy Yoakum	So
WR	80	Fred Zeigler	Jr

Defense

Pos.	#	Name	Class
DB	22	Don Bailey	So
DT	47	Tim Bice	Sr
DE	91	Don Brent	So
DT	79	John Coleman	Jr
DB	10	Carl Cowart	So
DT	70	Dan Dyches	So
DL	71	Rusty Ganas	So
LB	52	Dave Grant	Sr
DB	11	Tyler Hellams	So
DE	89	Lynn Hodge	Jr
DE	84	Dave Lucas	Jr
DT	72	George McCarthy	Jr
DB	38	Don Montgomery	So
DB	27	Wally Orrel	Sr
LB	53	Benny Padgett	So
DE	86	Jimmy Pope	So
DT	75	Jimmy Poston	So
DB	45	Roy Reeves	Sr
DE	92	Gary Scott	So
DB	21	Gerald Thomas	So
LB	59	Tom Tominack	Jr
LB	33	Al Usher	So
DB	15	Pat Watson	Jr
DE	85	Joe Wingard	So

Special teams

Pos.	#	Name	Class
K	1	Billy DuPre	So

Head coach

- Paul Dietzel

Coordinators/assistant coaches

Legend

- (C) Team captain
- (S) Suspended
- (I) Ineligible
- Injured
- Redshirt
