= 1968 Clemson Tigers football team =

American college football season

1968 Clemson Tigers football
- Conference: Atlantic Coast Conference
- Record: 4–5–1 (4–1–1 ACC)
- Head coach: Frank Howard (29th season)
- Captains: Billy Ammons; Ronnie Duckworth
- Home stadium: Memorial Stadium

1968 Atlantic Coast Conference football standings
	Conf.					Overall
Team	W		L		T	W		L		T
NC State $	6	–	1	–	0	6	–	4	–	0
Clemson	4	–	1	–	1	4	–	5	–	1
Virginia	4	–	2	–	0	7	–	3	–	0
South Carolina	4	–	3	–	0	4	–	6	–	0
Duke	3	–	4	–	0	4	–	6	–	0
Wake Forest	2	–	3	–	1	2	–	7	–	1
Maryland	2	–	5	–	0	2	–	8	–	0
North Carolina	1	–	6	–	0	3	–	7	–	0
$ – Conference champion; Virginia's game against Navy counted in the conference standings.

The 1968 Clemson Tigers football team was an American football team that represented Clemson University in the Atlantic Coast Conference (ACC) during the 1968 NCAA University Division football season. In its 29th season under head coach Frank Howard, the team compiled a 4–5–1 record (4–1–1 against conference opponents), finished second in the ACC, and outscored opponents by a total of 184 to 179. The team played its home games at Memorial Stadium in Clemson, South Carolina.

Quarterback Billy Ammons and defensive end Ronnie Duckworth were the team captains. The team's statistical leaders included Ammons with 1,006 passing yards, Buddy Gore with 776 rushing yards, Charlie Waters with 411 receiving yards, and Ray Yauger with 42 points scored (7 touchdowns).

Five Clemson players were selected by the Associated Press as first-team players on the 1968 All-Atlantic Coast Conference football team: back Buddy Gore; offensive tackle Joe Lhotsky; defensive end Ronnie Duckworth; defensive tackle John Cagle; and linebacker Jimmy Catoe.

== Schedule ==
Date	Time	Opponent	Site	Result	Attendance	Source
September 21	2:00 p.m.	at Wake Forest	Groves Stadium; Winston-Salem, NC	T 20–20	20,221	
September 28	2:00 p.m.	at Georgia*	Sanford Stadium; Athens, GA (rivalry)	L 13–31	59,008	
October 5	2:00 p.m.	at Georgia Tech*	Grant Field; Atlanta, GA (rivalry)	L 21–24	56,116	
October 12	1:30 p.m.	Auburn*^{†}	Memorial Stadium; Clemson, SC (rivalry)	L 10–21	38,501	
October 19	1:30 p.m.	Duke	Memorial Stadium; Clemson, SC	W 39–22	28,509	
October 26	2:15 p.m.	at Alabama*	Denny Stadium; Tuscaloosa, AL (rivalry)	L 14–21	43,874	
November 2	1:30 p.m.	at NC State	Carter Stadium; Raleigh, NC (rivalry)	W 24–19	31,183	
November 9	1:30 p.m.	at Maryland	Byrd Stadium; College Park, MD	W 16–0	28,596	
November 16	1:30 p.m.	North Carolina	Memorial Stadium; Clemson, SC	W 24–14	27,177	
November 23	1:30 p.m.	South Carolina	Memorial Stadium; Clemson, SC (rivalry)	L 3–7	53,247	
*Non-conference game; ^{†}Homecoming; All times are in Eastern time

== Roster ==
1968 Clemson Tigers football team roster
Players
Coaches
Offense Ronnie Duckworth

Pos.	#	Name	Class
C	56	Wayne Mulligan	Sr
QB	17	Charlie Waters	Jr

Defense

Pos.	#	Name	Class

Special teams

Pos.	#	Name	Class

Head coach

- Frank Howard

Coordinators/assistant coaches

Legend

- (C) Team captain
- (S) Suspended
- (I) Ineligible
- Injured
- Redshirt

Roster
