= Barlow Bend, Alabama =

Unincorporated community in Alabama, United States

Barlow Bend
- Unincorporated community
- Location in Alabama.
- Coordinates: 31°27′17″N 87°38′05″W
- Country: United States
- State: Alabama
- County: Clarke
- Elevation: 249 ft (76 m)
- Time zone: UTC-6 (Central (CST))
  - Summer (DST): UTC-5 (CDT)
- Area code: 251
- GNIS feature ID: 156024

Barlow Bend is an unincorporated community in Clarke County, Alabama, United States.

== History ==
The community is named for Bronson Barlow, an early settler of the area.

The first church building in Clarke County was built in Barlow Bend in 1819 by John French, a Methodist minister from Virginia. A post office was operated in Barlow Bend from 1877 to 1976.

== Media ==
A historical novel based on actual events, The Woods at Barlow Bend, is set in the area.

== Notable people ==
- Frank Howard, college football player and head coach of the Clemson Tigers football team from 1940 to 1969.
