= 1968 Virginia Cavaliers football team =

American college football season

1968 Virginia Cavaliers football
- Conference: Atlantic Coast Conference
- Record: 7–3 (4–2 ACC)
- Head coach: George Blackburn (4th season)
- Captains: Richard Brand; Clyde Arnette
- Home stadium: Scott Stadium

1968 Atlantic Coast Conference football standings
	Conf.					Overall
Team	W		L		T	W		L		T
NC State $	6	–	1	–	0	6	–	4	–	0
Clemson	4	–	1	–	1	4	–	5	–	1
Virginia	4	–	2	–	0	7	–	3	–	0
South Carolina	4	–	3	–	0	4	–	6	–	0
Duke	3	–	4	–	0	4	–	6	–	0
Wake Forest	2	–	3	–	1	2	–	7	–	1
Maryland	2	–	5	–	0	2	–	8	–	0
North Carolina	1	–	6	–	0	3	–	7	–	0
$ – Conference champion; Virginia's game against Navy counted in the conference standings.

The 1968 Virginia Cavaliers football team represented the University of Virginia as a member of the Atlantic Coast Conference (ACC) during the 1968 NCAA University Division football season. Led by fourth-year head coach George Blackburn, the Cavaliers compiled an overall record of 7–3 with a mark of 4–2 in conference play, placing third in the ACC. The team played home games at Scott Stadium in Charlottesville, Virginia.

The 1966 was the program's first winning season since 1952, and Cavaliers' performance in conference play was their best since joining the ACC in 1954. The team's star was running back Frank Quayle, who set the conference single-season rushing record with 1,213 yards and was named ACC Player of the Year. Blackburn was named ACC Coach of the Year.

== Schedule ==
Date	Opponent	Site	Result	Attendance	Source
September 21	at No. 1 Purdue*	Ross–Ade Stadium; West Lafayette, IN	L 6–44	60,384	
September 28	VMI*	Scott Stadium; Charlottesville, VA	W 47–0	24,000	
October 5	Davidson*^{†}	Scott Stadium; Charlottesville, VA	W 41–14	16,500	
October 12	at Duke	Wallace Wade Stadium; Durham, NC	W 50–20	22,000	
October 19	at NC State	Carter Stadium; Raleigh, NC	L 0–19	22,800	
October 26	at Navy (Note: Virginia's game against Navy counted in the ACC standings.)	Navy–Marine Corps Memorial Stadium; Annapolis, MD	W 24–0	26,127	
November 2	South Carolina	Scott Stadium; Charlottesville, VA	L 28–49	25,600	
November 9	at North Carolina	Kenan Memorial Stadium; Chapel Hill, NC (South's Oldest Rivalry)	W 41–6	23,000	
November 16	Tulane*	Scott Stadium; Charlottesville, VA	W 63–47	14,500	
November 23	Maryland	Scott Stadium; Charlottesville, VA (rivalry)	W 28–23	18,000	
*Non-conference game; ^{†}Homecoming; Rankings from AP Poll released prior to the game
