= K. Lee Scott =

K. (Keaton) Lee Scott (born 1950 in Valley, Alabama) is an internationally known teacher, musician, conductor, and composer of sacred music, choral music, and hymns, residing in Birmingham, Alabama.

== Biography ==
Scott has been recognized, during the past twenty plus years, as one of America's foremost composers of music for the church. His hymns are published in eight hymnals, including A New Hymnal for Colleges and Schools (Yale University Press), Voices United (The United Church of Canada) and With One Voice (Evangelical Lutheran Church in America). He has published over 300 compositions including anthems, hymns, works for solo voice, organ, brass, and major works including a Christmas Cantata and Te Deum, through more than a dozen publishers. He was jointly commissioned (1995) by the Hymn Society in the United States and Canada and Choristers Guild to compose a hymn setting for their convention in San Diego.

Scott holds two degrees in choral music from the University of Alabama School of Music, where he studied under Frederick Prentice. He has also studied composition with Paul Hedwall and Gail Kubik. He has served on the music faculty of the University of Alabama School of Music, the University of Alabama at Birmingham Department of Music and the Samford University School of Music. He has appeared as guest conductor and clinician throughout the United States, and in Canada and Africa.

Scott's original hymn, titled "The Tree of Life" (Shades Mountain), has become one of the important hymn settings of our time. Two volumes of SAB (soprano, alto, baritone) anthems, Coram Deo I and II, are gaining wide popularity. In addition, MorningStar Music Publishers published Rejoice in God: The Lee Scott Hymnary.

== Selected discography ==
- "The Wind of Heaven" The Lee Scott Singers.
- "The Glory of Christ" The Lee Scott Singers.
- "Christmastide" The Lee Scott Singers. Produced by Ray Reach.
- "Requiem" The Lee Scott Singers. Produced by Ray Reach.
- "Band of Angels - A Service of Remembrance" The Lee Scott Singers. Commissioned for presentation during the 50th anniversary commemoration (2013) of the tragic church bombing in Birmingham, Alabama which killed four little African-American girls. Premiered in 2013 at the Alys Stephens Center on the campus of the University of Alabama at Birmingham. A more recent recording was done on August 4 and 5, 2014, featuring the Lee Scott Singers, produced by Birmingham-based jazz pianist / composer / arranger Ray Reach.
