= 1968 North Carolina Tar Heels football team =

American college football season

1968 North Carolina Tar Heels football
- Conference: Atlantic Coast Conference
- Record: 3–7 (1–6 ACC)
- Head coach: Bill Dooley (2nd season)
- Offensive coordinator: Bobby Collins (2nd season)
- Defensive coordinator: Lee Hayley (2nd season)
- Captains: Gayle Bomar; Mike Smith
- Home stadium: Kenan Memorial Stadium

1968 Atlantic Coast Conference football standings
	Conf.					Overall
Team	W		L		T	W		L		T
NC State $	6	–	1	–	0	6	–	4	–	0
Clemson	4	–	1	–	1	4	–	5	–	1
Virginia	4	–	2	–	0	7	–	3	–	0
South Carolina	4	–	3	–	0	4	–	6	–	0
Duke	3	–	4	–	0	4	–	6	–	0
Wake Forest	2	–	3	–	1	2	–	7	–	1
Maryland	2	–	5	–	0	2	–	8	–	0
North Carolina	1	–	6	–	0	3	–	7	–	0
$ – Conference champion; Virginia's game against Navy counted in the conference standings.

The 1968 North Carolina Tar Heels football team represented the University of North Carolina at Chapel Hill during the 1968 NCAA University Division football season. The Tar Heels were led by second-year head coach Bill Dooley and played their home games at Kenan Memorial Stadium in Chapel Hill, North Carolina. They competed as members of the Atlantic Coast Conference, finishing in last.

== Schedule ==
Date	Time	Opponent	Site	Result	Attendance	Source
September 21	1:30 p.m.	NC State	Kenan Memorial Stadium; Chapel Hill, NC (rivalry)	L 6–38	45,500	
September 28	1:30 p.m.	South Carolina	Kenan Memorial Stadium; Chapel Hill, NC (rivalry)	L 27–32	28,000	
October 5	7:30 p.m.	at Vanderbilt*	Dudley Field; Nashville, TN	W 8–7	20,480	
October 12	1:30 p.m.	at Maryland	Byrd Stadium; College Park, MD	L 24–33	27,480	
October 19	1:30 p.m.	No. 7 Florida*	Kenan Memorial Stadium; Chapel Hill, NC	W 22–7	28,000	
October 26	1:30 p.m.	at Wake Forest	Groves Stadium; Winston-Salem, NC (rivalry)	L 31–48	30,000	
November 2	3:30 p.m.	at Air Force*	Falcon Stadium; Colorado Springs, CO	L 15–28	24,596	
November 9	1:30 p.m.	Virginia	Kenan Memorial Stadium; Chapel Hill, NC (South's Oldest Rivalry)	L 6–41	23,000	
November 16	1:30 p.m.	at Clemson	Memorial Stadium; Clemson, SC	L 14–24	27,177	
November 23	1:30 p.m.	Duke	Kenan Memorial Stadium; Chapel Hill, NC (Victory Bell)	W 25–14	44,500	
*Non-conference game; Rankings from AP Poll released prior to the game; All times are in Eastern time

== Roster ==
1968 North Carolina Tar Heels football team roster
Players			Coaches
Offense: Pos. / # / Name / Class; RB / 23 / Don McCauley / So	Defense: Pos. / # / Name / Class	Special teams: Pos. / # / Name / Class	Head coach: Bill Dooley; Coordinators/assistant coaches Legend: (C) Team captain; (S) Suspended; (I) Ineligible; Injured; Redshirt
