= Frank Howard (American football) =

American college football player and coach

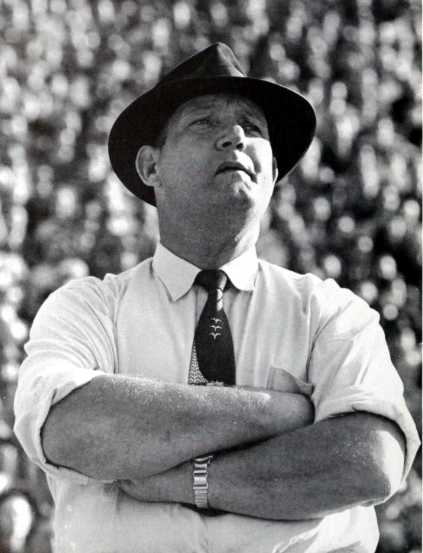
- Howard in 1955

Biographical details
- Born: March 25, 1909; Barlow Bend, Alabama, U.S.
- Died: January 26, 1996 (aged 86); Clemson, South Carolina, U.S.

Playing career

Football
- 1928–1930: Alabama
- Position: Guard

Coaching career (HC unless noted)

Football
- 1931–1939: Clemson (line)
- 1940–1969: Clemson

Baseball
- 1943: Clemson

Track & field
- 1931–1939: Clemson

Administrative career (AD unless noted)
- 1940–1971: Clemson

Head coaching record
- Overall: 165–118–12 (football); 12–3 (baseball)
- Bowls: 3–3

Accomplishments and honors

Championships
- As coach: 2× SoCon (1940, 1948); 6× ACC (1956, 1958–1959, 1965–1967); As player: National (1930)

Awards
- 2× ACC Coach of the Year (1958, 1966)
- College Football Hall of Fame; Inducted in 1989 (profile)

Frank J. Howard (March 25, 1909 – January 26, 1996) was an American college football player and coach. He played college football for Alabama. After a career-ending injury, Howard joined the staff at Clemson College and became head coach in 1940. Howard coached the Clemson Tigers for 30 years, amassing the 15th most wins of any college football coach. He led Clemson to ten bowl games, an undefeated season in 1948, and several top-20 rankings during his tenure as head coach. During his stay at Clemson, Howard also oversaw the athletic department, ticket sales, and was an assistant coach for the baseball team. He was inducted into the College Football Hall of Fame, the South Carolina Sports Hall of Fame, the Alabama Sports Hall of Fame and the Clemson Ring of Honor. The playing surface at Clemson's Memorial Stadium is named after him.

== Coaching career ==
In 1963, after Maryland announced that African-American wide receiver Daryyl Hill was to play, Clemson threatened to leave the conference. Howard vowed that his team would not allow any black to play in their stadium, although Hill did end up playing in the scheduled game.

In the early 1960s, however, Howard allegedly showed compassion to the local community including those at segregated African-American school that he could not recruit. One of the football players was future Michigan State University All American and All Pro George Webster. As a junior at Westside High in Anderson, S.C. Webster suffered a knee injury. The injury could have spelled the end of his career, but then-Clemson coach Frank Howard helped Webster. Michigan State teammate Jim Summers of Orangeburg, S.C., tells the story.

“Frank Howard made sure that operation at Clemson University’s medical facility,” Summers said. “George was probably the first black person to spend any sustained time on that campus. If it wasn’t for segregation, George probably would have gone to Clemson, Frank treated him so well.” George Webster was drafted 5th overall by the Houston Oilers in the 1967 NFL/AFL draft draft after winning two national championships.

== Head coaching record ==
=== Football ===
Year	Team	Overall	Conference	Standing	Bowl/playoffs	Coaches^{#}	AP^{°}
Clemson Tigers (Southern Conference) (1940–1951)
1940	Clemson	6–2–1	6–0	1st			
1941	Clemson	7–2	5–1	3rd			
1942	Clemson	3–6–1	2–3–1	9th			
1943	Clemson	2–6	2–3	T–7th			
1944	Clemson	4–5	3–1	3rd			
1945	Clemson	6–3–1	2–1–1	4th			
1946	Clemson	4–5	2–3	T–10th			
1947	Clemson	4–5	1–3	12th			
1948	Clemson	11–0	5–0	1st	W Gator		11
1949	Clemson	4–4–2	2–2	T–7th			
1950	Clemson	9–0–1	3–0–1	2nd	W Orange	12	10
1951	Clemson	7–3	3–1	5th	L Gator		20
Clemson Tigers (Independent) (1952)
1952	Clemson	2–6–1					
Clemson Tigers (Atlantic Coast Conference) (1953–1969)
1953	Clemson	3–5–1	1–2	6th			
1954	Clemson	5–5	1–2	5th			
1955	Clemson	7–3	3–1	3rd			
1956	Clemson	7–2–2	4–0–1	1st	L Orange		19
1957	Clemson	7–3	4–3	T–3rd		18	
1958	Clemson	8–3	5–1	1st	L Sugar	13	12
1959	Clemson	9–2	6–1	1st	W Bluebonnet	11	11
1960	Clemson	6–4	4–2	4th			
1961	Clemson	5–5	3–3	T–3rd			
1962	Clemson	6–4	5–1	2nd			
1963	Clemson	5–4–1	5–2	T–3rd			
1964	Clemson	3–7	2–4	7th			
1965	Clemson	5–5	4–3	T–1st			
1966	Clemson	6–4	6–1	1st			
1967	Clemson	6–4	6–0	1st			
1968	Clemson	4–5–1	4–1–1	2nd			
1969	Clemson	4–6	3–3	T–3rd			
Clemson:		165–118–12	102–48–5				
Total:		165–118–12					
National championship Conference title Conference division title or championship game berth
^{#}Rankings from final Coaches Poll.; ^{°}Rankings from final AP Poll.
