= River View, Alabama =

Coordinates: 32°47′20″N 85°8′42″W

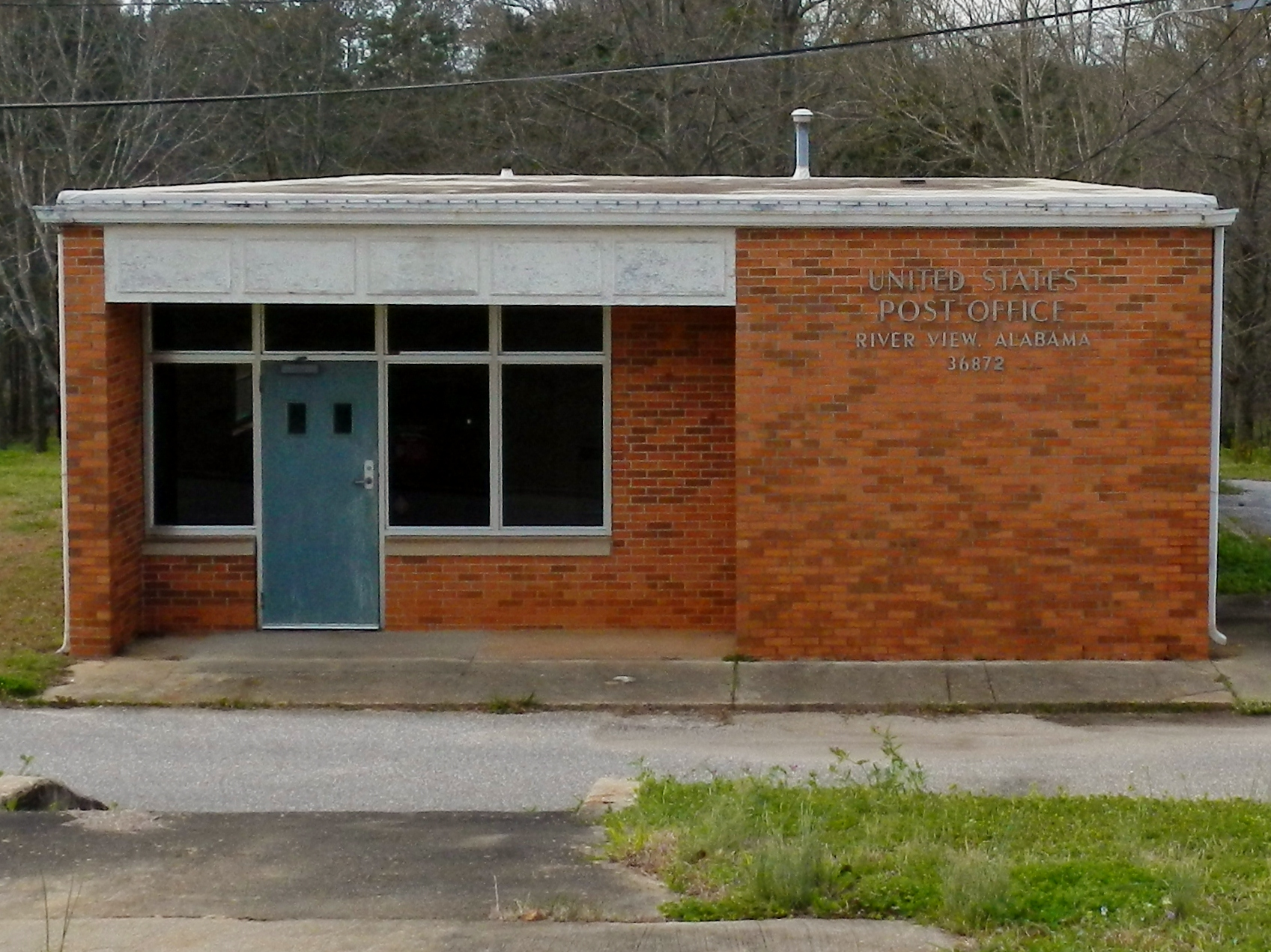
The now-defunct post office (ZIP code: 36872) at River View, Alabama.

River View is a subdivision of Valley, Alabama on the Chattahoochee River. On May 20, 1980, the communities of Shawmut, Langdale, Fairfax, and River View merged to form the city of Valley. It is the location of Riverview Historic District, which is listed on the U.S. National Register of Historic Places.
