= Ed Chalupka =

Canadian gridiron football player (1947–2019)

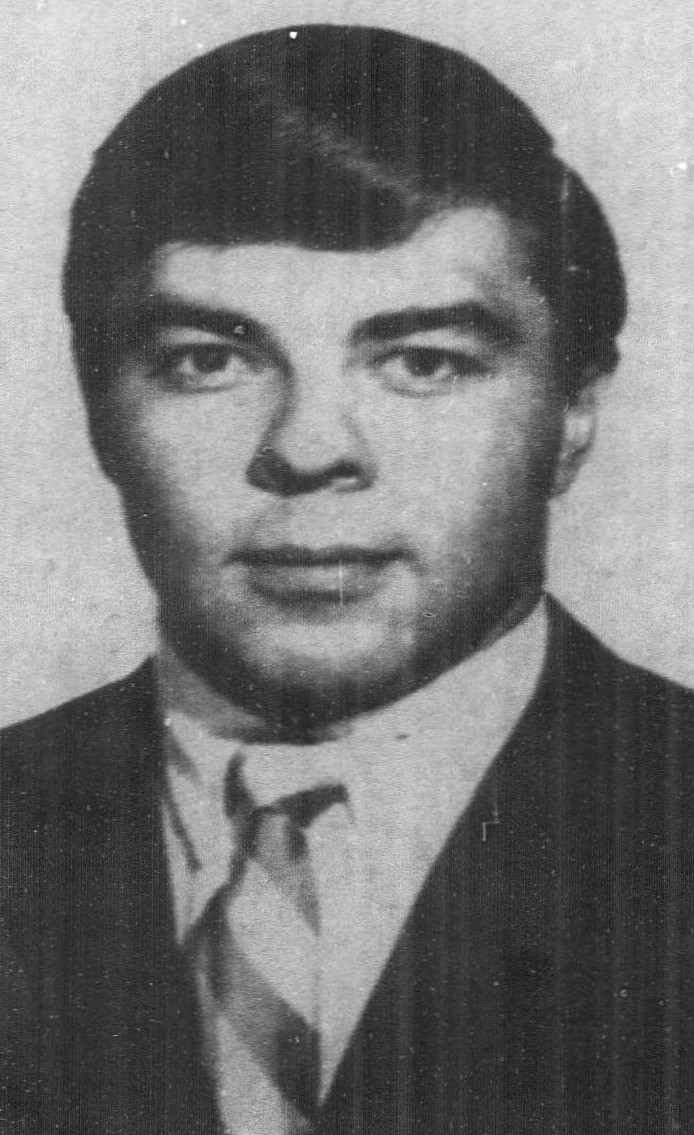
- Chalupka, circa 1969

Profile
- Position: Guard

Personal information
- Born: February 23, 1947; Peterborough, Ontario, Canada
- Died: November 17, 2019 (aged 72); Ontario, Canada
- Listed height: 6 ft 0 in (1.83 m)
- Listed weight: 225 lb (102 kg)

Career information
- College: North Carolina

Career history

Playing
- 1970–1976: Hamilton Tiger-Cats

Operations
- 1981–1986: CFLPA (President)

Awards and highlights
- Grey Cup champion (1972); First-team All-ACC (1969)

Edward Chalupka (February 23, 1947 – November 17, 2019) was a Canadian Football League (CFL) player. He played college football at the University of North Carolina. Chalupka played his entire professional career as a guard for the Hamilton Tiger-Cats, from 1970 through 1976. He won the Grey Cup with Hamilton in 1972.

In 1981, five years after retiring from the CFL, Chalupka was elected as the fifth president of the Canadian Football League Players' Association (CFLPA). He served as CFLPA president until 1986, and was succeeded and preceded in that role by Saskatchewan Roughriders running back George Reed. He died on November 17, 2019, at the age of 72.
