= Ron Carpenter (defensive lineman) =

American football player (born 1948)

No. 70
- Positions: Defensive tackle, Defensive end

Personal information
- Born: June 24, 1948 (age 78); High Point, North Carolina, U.S.
- Listed height: 6 ft 4 in (1.93 m)
- Listed weight: 261 lb (118 kg)

Career information
- College: NC State (1966-1969)
- NFL draft: 1970: 2nd round, 32nd overall pick

Career history
- Cincinnati Bengals (1970–1976)

Awards and highlights
- First-team All-American (1968); 2× First-team All-ACC (1968, 1969)

Career NFL statistics
- Sacks: 45.5
- Fumble recoveries: 10
- Stats at Pro Football Reference

Ronald Nelson Carpenter (born on June 24, 1948) is an American former professional football player who was a defensive end and defensive tackle for seven seasons with the Cincinnati Bengals of the National Football League (NFL). He played college football for the North Carolina State Wolfpack.

== Early life ==
Carpenter was born on June 24, 1948, in High Point, North Carolina. He attended Thomasville High School, in Thomasville, North Carolina. He played both offense and defense on the school's football team. As a junior in 1964, he stood out on Thomasville's 11–1 championship team. He was All-State as a senior, and played in the Shrine Bowl game between North Carolina and South Carolina high school football all-stars. Carpenter also participated on Thomasville's track team, running the 880-yard run and throwing the shot put. He was also on the baseball and basketball teams. As a sophomore he weighed 165 pounds (74.8 kg), and then increased his weight to 215 pounds (97.5 kg) as a junior and 245 pounds (111.1 kg) as a high school senior.

== College career ==
Carpenter was offered football scholarships to the major North Carolina universities, Notre Dame University, the University of Michigan, and the University of Minnesota, among other schools. Carpenter chose North Carolina State University (N. C. State), after being recruited by N. C. State assistant coach Jim Tapp, who had also been an assistant coach at Thomasville. Carpenter was reported to be 6 ft 6 in (1.98 m) 240 lb (108.9 kg) or 245 lb (111.1 kg) as a freshman; and 6 ft 6 in (1.98 m) 250 lb (113.4 kg) as a sophomore and junior. As a senior, he was reported by various media at 6 ft 4 in (1.93 m) 250 lb; and also at 6 ft 5 in (1.96 m) 250 lb by the Associated Press. He ran the 40-yard dash in five seconds.

He played both offense and defense on the freshman football team in 1966. In his sophomore year (1967), he played on the varsity defensive line at right and left tackle, as well as middle guard. After seven games as a reserve, Carpenter started his first game, against the University of Virginia, in early November. He replaced All-American tackle Dennis Byrd who was injured the prior week against Duke University. After the victory over Virginia, N. C. State head coach Earle Edwards said Carpenter did a fine job and that "'he was a Byrd out there today'".

Going into the 1968 season, he reduced his weight to 248 pounds. As a starter, he would only have to focus on playing one defensive line position, instead of three positions as he did as a sophomore. This meant he knew who his individual opponent would be on the offensive line, and could focus on preparing for that player. In 1968, the Newspaper Enterprise Association (NEA) selected Carpenter a first-team All-American at defensive end in his junior season (even though he played tackle). The Associated Press selected him first-team All-Atlantic Coast Conference (ACC) at tackle.

As a senior in 1969, the team was 3–6–1, and opposing teams avoided rushing to Carpenter's side of the defensive line. The Associated Press selected him first-team All-ACC at tackle, receiving the most votes for any defensive player on the first-team. He was selected to play in the July 1970 Chicago College All-Star Game against the Kansas City Chiefs, and was the only player from the Atlantic Coast Conference to be so honored. He also played in the Senior Bowl and East-West Shrine Game.

Even after becoming an NFL player, Carpenter would take time in the Spring to help tutor N.C. State's linemen.

== Professional football ==
The Bengals selected Carpenter in the second round of the 1970 NFL draft (32nd overall). He played defensive tackle and defensive end for the Bengals from 1970-76. The Bengals' 1972 media guide lists Carpenter at 6 ft 5 in (1.96 m) 261 lb (118) kg. Other sources list his professional playing height at 6 ft 4 in.

As a rookie in 1970, Carpenter became a fulltime starter at right defensive end, starting all 14 games, with two quarterback sacks. The three-year old Bengals had an 8–6 record, and lost in the first round of the playoffs to the eventual Super Bowl champion Baltimore Colts, 17–0. In 1971, he again started all 14 games at right defensive end, with five sacks. He was part of the Bengals' defense that the Associated Press named NFL Defensive Player of the Week, in a rare move naming an entire defense instead of an individual player. The Bengals had shut out the San Diego Chargers on November 28, limiting the Chargers' total offense to less than 135 yards, to go along with six interceptions.

In 1972, the Bengals drafted Sherman White with the second overall pick in the 1972 NFL draft, and White became the team's starting defensive right end as a rookie. The Bengals' defensive line coach, Chuck Studley, believed Carpenter would be more effective at tackle than defensive end. Steve Chomyszak started 10 games at defensive right tackle, with All-Pro Mike Reid at left tackle. Carpenter replaced Chomyszak at starting right tackle on November 26 against the Chicago Bears, and coach Paul Brown was pleased with his play. Carpenter then started the final three games of the season at right tackle as well.

In 1973, Carpenter started 12 games at right tackle. He led the Bengals' defensive linemen in tackles and was second in sacks that season. Left tackle Mike Reid was the Bengals' first round draft selection in 1970. Carpenter played side-by-side with Reid at defensive tackle from 1973 to 1974, with Carpenter at right tackle and Reid at left tackle. They unofficially had 23 sacks between them in 1973 (Carpenter with 10); and 20 sacks in 1974 (Carpenter with 13). Carpenter's 13 sacks were a career-high and were second most in the NFL in 1974. He had a safety against Mike Phipps of the Cleveland Browns during the first game of the 1974 season.

The Bengals were 10–4 in 1973, losing in the first round of the playoffs to eventual Super Bowl champions, the Miami Dolphins. The Bengals were 7–7 in 1974. Carpenter and Reid were Cincinnati teammates on the defensive line from 1970 to 1974, with Reid retiring from professional football after the 1974 season to pursue a professional music career.

In 1975, the Bengals started the season 7–1 and ended with an 11–3 record, again reaching the playoffs. Carpenter started all 14 games at right tackle, with six sacks and four fumble recoveries. No longer in Reid's shadow, Carpenter's consistently high level of play and big play abilities, already well known in Cincinnati, became apparent to the rest of the league. Carpenter, however, never thought of himself as being in Reid's shadow. The Bengals lost in the first round of the playoffs to the Oakland Raiders, 31–28, with Carpenter recovering a fumble late in the fourth quarter that gave the Bengals a chance to win the game; but the Bengals offense was thwarted by a Ted Hendricks sack of quarterback Ken Anderson. In 1975, Carpenter's four fumble recoveries tied for third in the NFL.

Carpenter again started 14 games at right tackle in 1976. He had 7.5 sacks and two fumble recoveries. The Bengals were 10–4, but did not make the playoffs. During a critical late November 1976 game between the Bengals and defending champion Pittsburgh Steelers, played in heavy snow conditions, Carpenter blocked a Roy Gerela field goal attempt. However, the Bengals lost the game 7–3.

Carpenter suffered serious disc issues in his back before the season started in 1977. He had a ruptured disc that required surgery and an abnormal disc above that one. This ended his career. After missing the entire 1977 season, he considered a comeback in May 1978, but found after a few days he could not run without pain. Over his seven-year career, Carpenter started 86 games, being credited unofficially with 45.5 sacks, to go along with 10 fumble recoveries and a safety.

== Legacy and honors ==
Duke football captain Jim Dearth said Carpenter was the toughest opponent he ever faced in the Atlantic Coast Conference, observing Carpenter's ideal combination of size, strength, agility and quickness at tackle.

Hall of Fame coach Paul Brown said of Carpenter when he coached Carpenter on the Bengals: "'He is some kind of guy . . . You can classify him as one of the better tackles in the league. He's consistent, he's reliable, he makes a lot of big plays you're prone to overlook. He'll come up with the big sack on the quarterback or the big blocked place kick. I think the best way to describe him is a tenacious competitor'".

As part of the Bengals' 50th Anniversary season, Carpenter was honored as a Bengals Legend during halftime of an October 8, 2017 game between the Bengals and the Buffalo Bills.

== Personal life ==
During the offseasons while with the Bengals, Carpenter worked as a stockbroker while living in Cincinnati. Carpenter stated in a 1989 interview, "During four off-seasons I worked as a stockbroker in Cincinnati; I always had a job during the off-seasons in my career". Before retiring due to disc problems in his back, Carpenter had purchased an interest in a Miller Brewing Company beer distributorship in Charleston, South Carolina in 1976. He had been interested in investing in a beer distributorship even before his back problems arose, first attempting to invest in a Coors Brewing Company distributorship in 1974, unsuccessfully. When he was unable to play in 1977, he devoted full time to operating the Miller beer distributorship. By 1979, Carpenter was the vice president of Bay Beverage Distributors, Inc.; and he, his wife Jerri and his son had moved to Mt. Pleasant, South Carolina. He later became president of Bay Beverage, and was elected chair of the South Carolina Beer Association's board of directors on multiple occasions.
