= Riverview Historic District (Valley, Alabama) =

Historic district in Alabama, United States

- U.S. National Register of Historic Places
- U.S. Historic district
- Alabama Register of Landmarks and Heritage
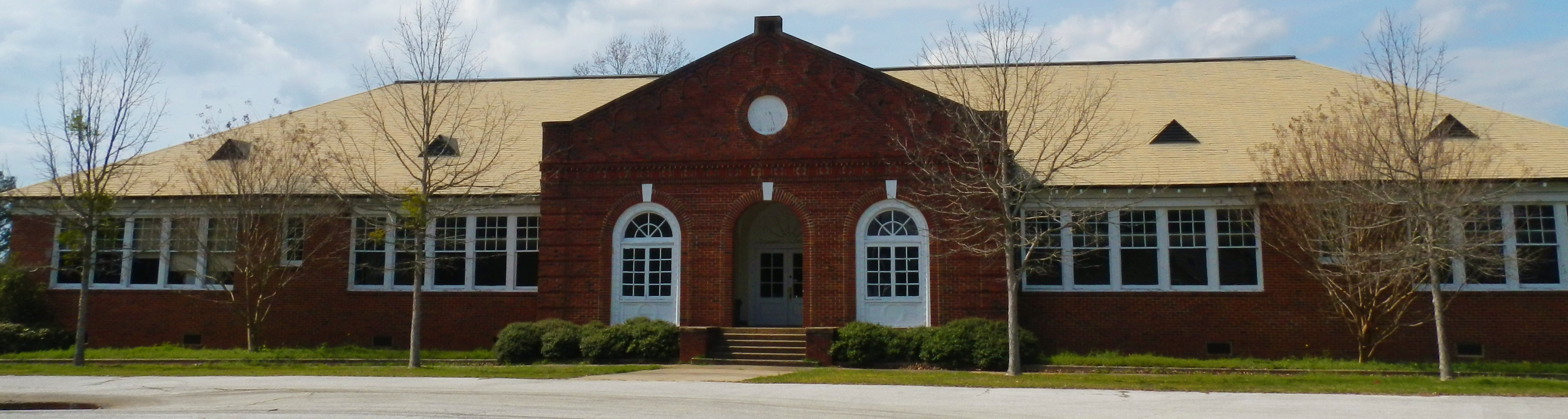
- River View School

- Location within Alabama Location within the United States
- Location: Roughly bounded by School and G.I. Streets, Chattahoochee River and along California Street, Valley, Alabama
- Coordinates: 32°47′14″N 85°8′45″W
- MPS: Valley, Alabama, and the West Point Manufacturing Company MPS
- NRHP reference No.: 99001300

Significant dates
- Added to NRHP: November 12, 1999
- Designated ARLH: December 19, 1991

Riverview Historic District is a historic district along the Chattahoochee River in River View, Alabama, United States. It was listed on the Alabama Register of Landmarks and Heritage on December 19, 1991, and on the National Register of Historic Places on November 12, 1999.

== See also ==
- Langdale Historic District

== Gallery ==
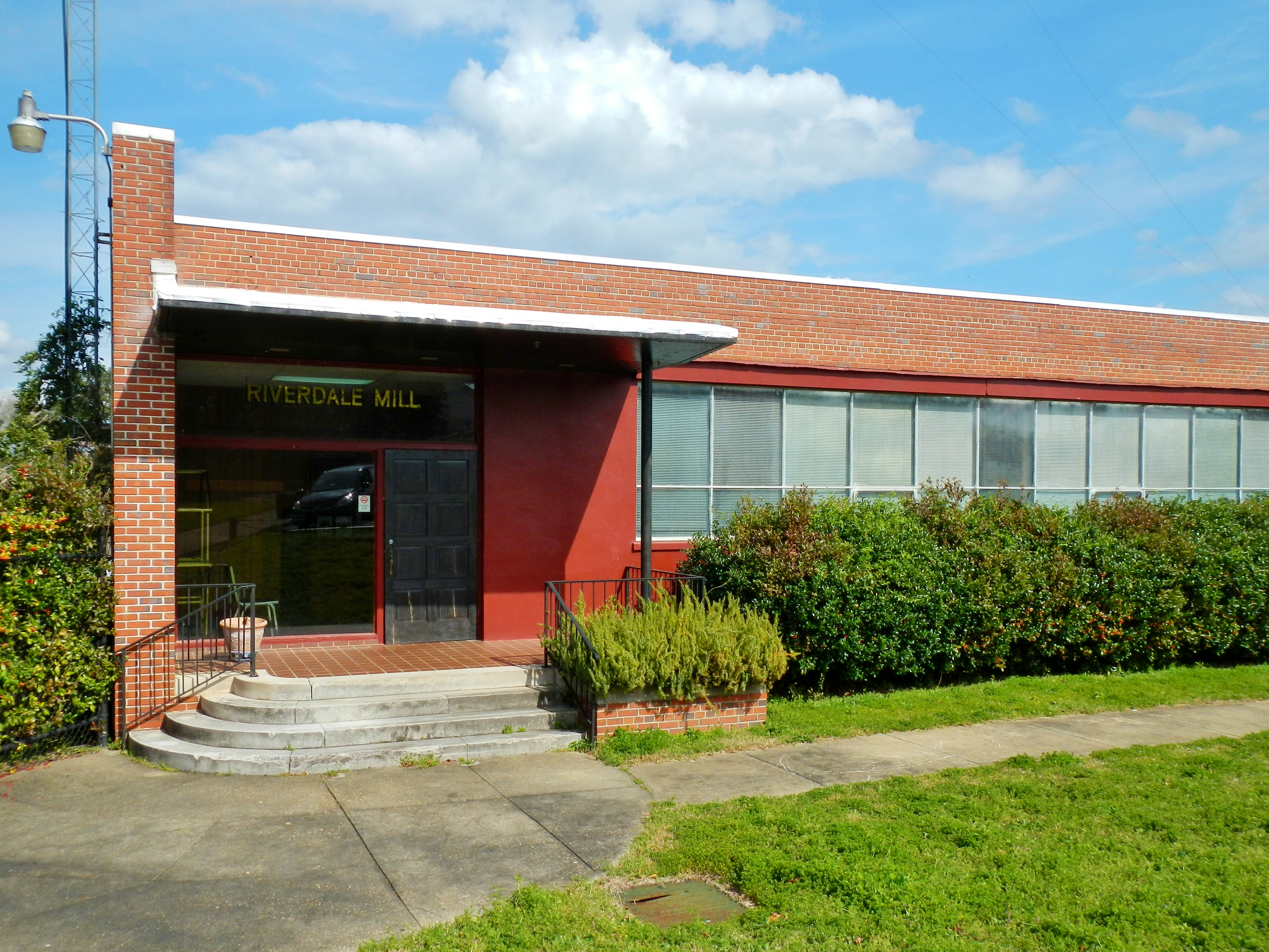
The Riverdale Mill in the Riverview Historic District

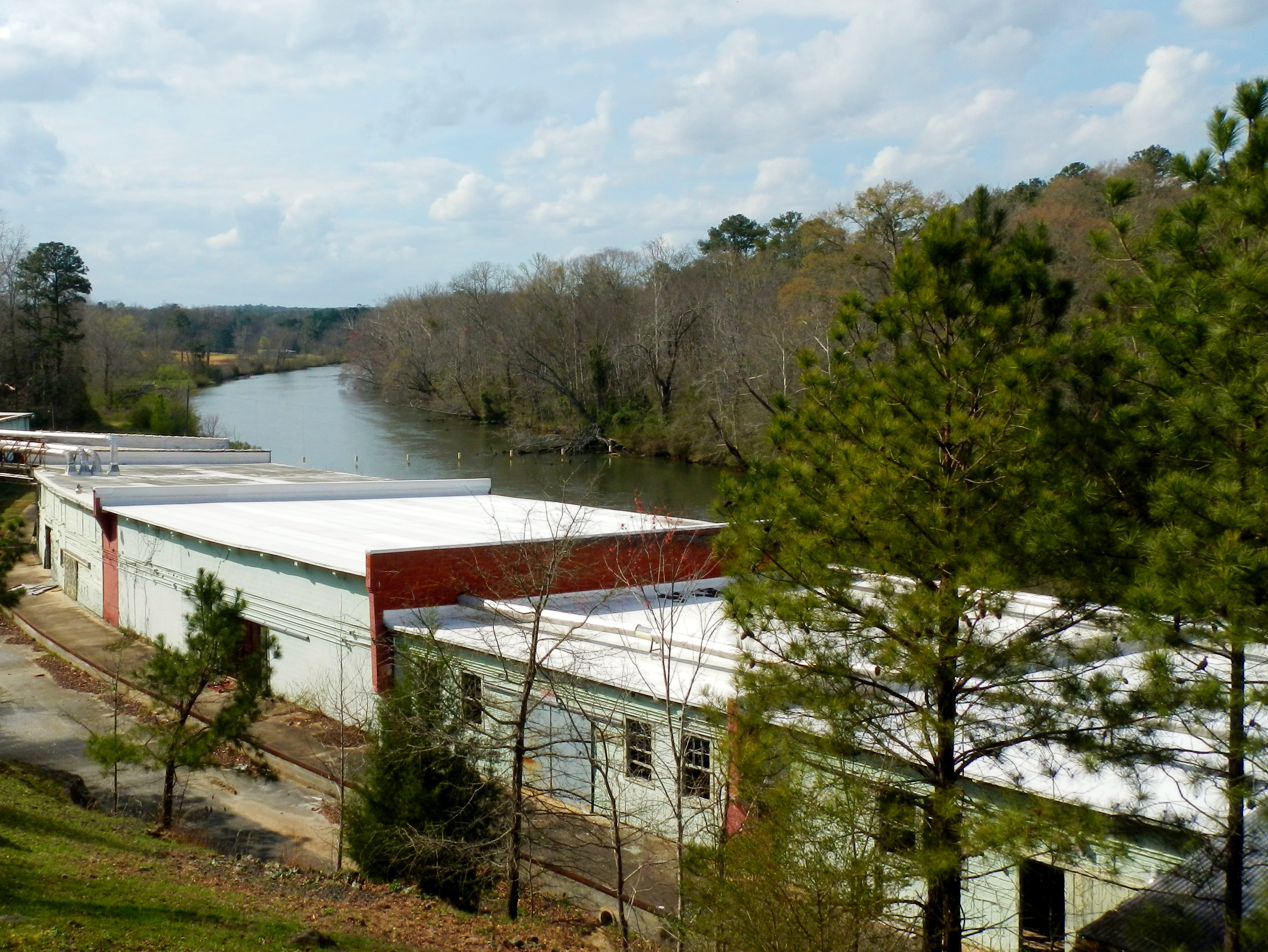
The Chattahoochee River at Riverdale Mill.

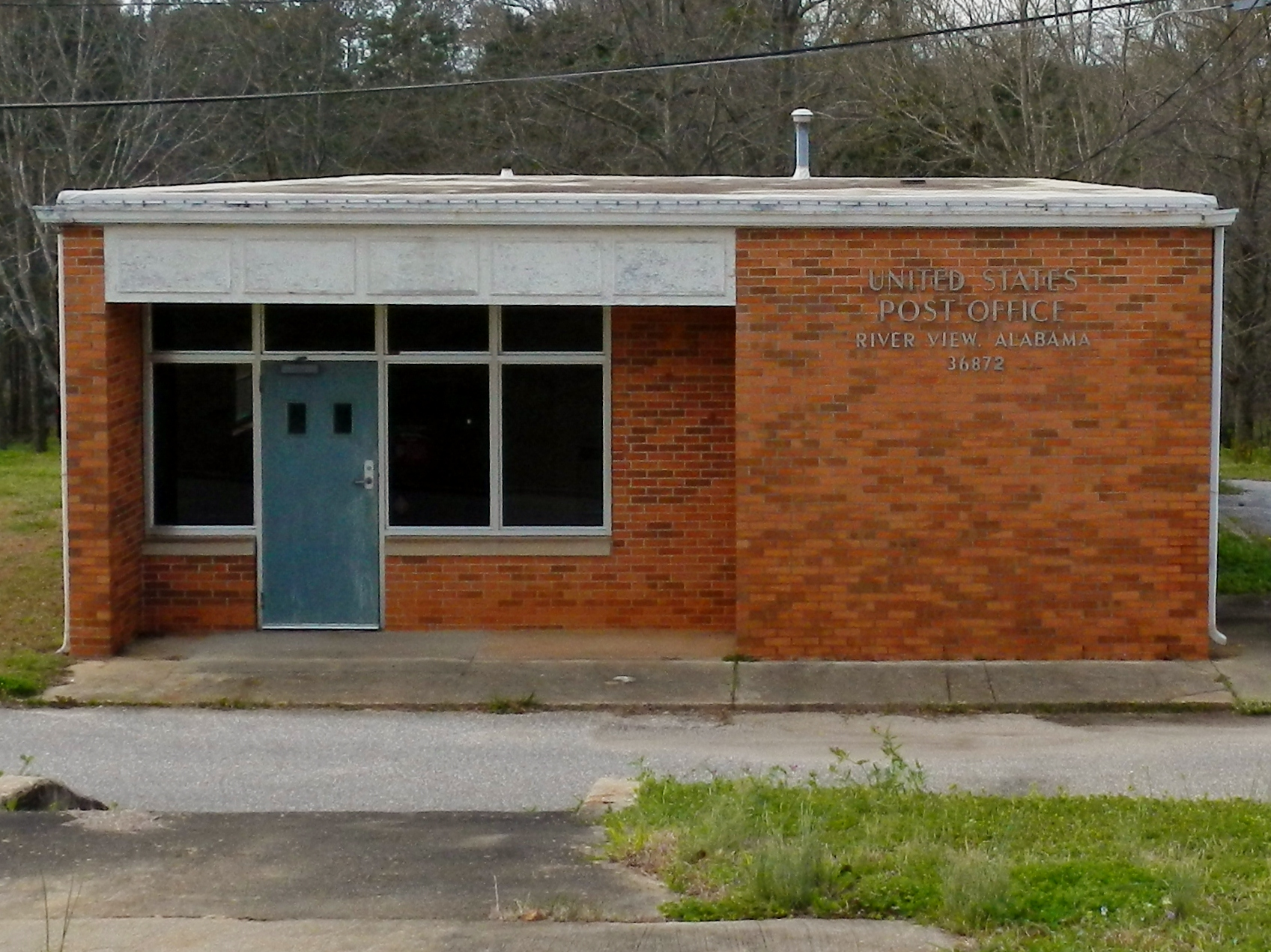
The now-defunct post office (ZIP code: 36872) at River View, Alabama.
