= Shawmut Historic District =

Historic district in Alabama, United States

- U.S. National Register of Historic Places
- Alabama Register of Landmarks and Heritage
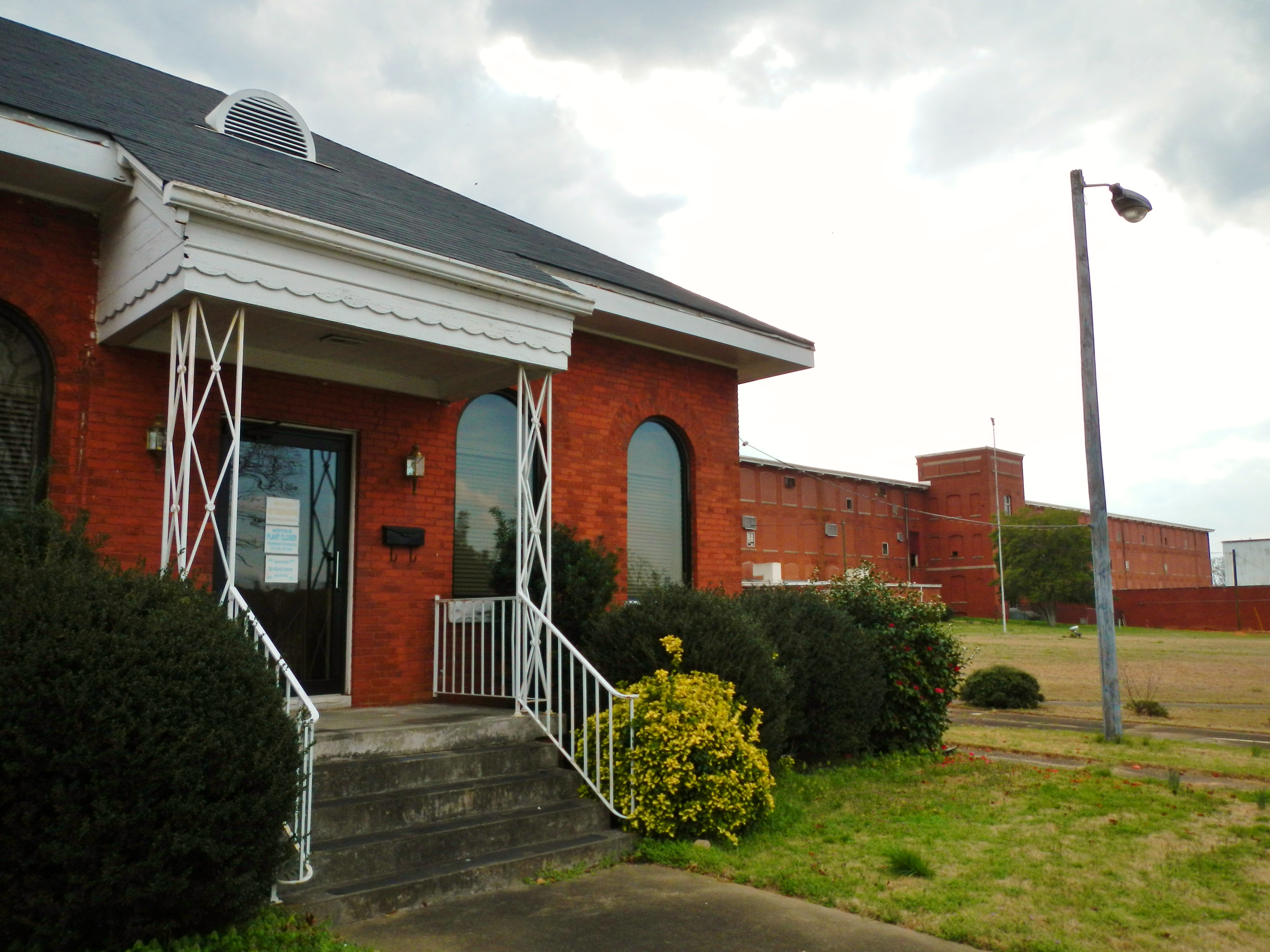

- Location within Alabama
- Location: Roughly bounded by 25th Blvd., 29th Blvd., 20th Ave., 35th St., and 38th Blvd., Valley, Alabama
- Coordinates: 32°50′25″N 85°11′00″W
- Area: 201 acres (0.81 km^{2})
- Built by: Lockwood, Greene & Company
- Architectural style: Bungalow/craftsman, depreesion modern
- MPS: Valley, Alabama, and the West Point Manufacturing Company MPS
- NRHP reference No.: 99001176

Significant dates
- Added to NRHP: September 24, 1999
- Designated ARLH: December 19, 1991

The Shawmut Historic District, in Valley, Alabama, United States, is a historic district which was listed on the National Register of Historic Places in 1999. The listing included 275 contributing buildings, a contributing structure, and a contributing site on 201 acres (0.81 km^{2}). It is roughly bounded by 25th Boulevard, 29th Boulevard, 20th Avenue, 35th Street, and 38th Boulevard.

It includes work by the Lockwood, Greene & Company.

The architecture is in the Bungalow/Craftsman and Depression modern styles.
