= Win Headley =

American gridiron football player and coach (1949–2023)

Profile
- Position: Offensive guard

Personal information
- Born: July 4, 1949; Culver City, California, U.S.
- Died: January 18, 2023 (aged 73); Naples, Florida, U.S.
- Listed height: 6 ft 3 in (1.91 m)
- Listed weight: 245 lb (111 kg)

Career information
- High school: Staples (Westport, Connecticut)
- College: Wake Forest
- NFL draft: 1971: 8th round, 193rd overall pick

Career history

Playing
- 1971: Green Bay Packers*
- 1971: Hartford Knights
- 1972: Montreal Alouettes
- * Offseason or practice squad member only

Coaching
- 1972–1973: Winston-Salem State Rams (AC)
- 1973–1975: Wake Forest Demon Deacons (AC)
- 1975–1982: Princeton Tigers (AC)

Awards and highlights
- First-team All-American (1970); First-team All-ACC (1970)

Winthrop Sargent Headley (July 4, 1949 – January 18, 2023) was an American football offensive guard who played one season with the Montreal Alouettes of the Canadian Football League (CFL). He was drafted by the Green Bay Packers of the National Football League (NFL) in the eighth round of the 1971 NFL draft. He played college football at Wake Forest University. Headley was also a member of the Hartford Knights of the Atlantic Coast Football League (ACFL).

== Early life ==
Headley played high school football at Staples High School in Westport, Connecticut. He earned All-County and All-State honors as well as being selected to the New York Giants Tri-State Football Team his senior year in 1969. He also participated in wrestling, earning All-County honors and winning the state heavyweight championship in his senior season.

== College career ==
Headley was a three-year starter at defensive tackle for the Wake Forest Demon Deacons. The Demon Deacons won their first Atlantic Coast Conference championship in 1970 as Headley was named First-team All-ACC and voted team MVP. He was also named a Second-team All-American by the Walter Camp Foundation and an All-American by the National Education Association. He was named co-recipient of the Arnold Palmer Award, which is given to Wake Forest's best male athlete, in the spring of 1971. Headley also won the Bill George Award, which is given to Wake Forest's best lineman, in 1970. He was inducted into the Wake Forest Sports Hall of Fame in 1994.

== Professional career ==
Headley was selected by the Green Bay Packers of the NFL in the eighth round with the 193rd pick in the 1971 NFL draft and converted to offensive guard. He was released before the start of the regular season. He played for the Hartford Knights of the ACFL in 1971. Headley was signed by the CFL's Montreal Alouettes in March 1972. He played in two games for the Alouettes in 1972.

== Coaching career ==
Headley served as an assistant coach for the Winston-Salem State Rams from 1972 to 1973. He was an assistant coach with the Wake Forest Demon Deacons from 1973 to 1975. He served as an assistant coach for the Princeton Tigers from 1975 to 1982. Headley returned to coaching at the high school level in 2003 and has served as a coach at several schools, including Princeton Day School in Princeton, New Jersey and Montgomery High School in Skillman, New Jersey.
