= 1968 Wake Forest Demon Deacons football team =

American college football season

1968 Wake Forest Demon Deacons football
- Conference: Atlantic Coast Conference
- Record: 2–7–1 (2–3–1 ACC)
- Head coach: Bill Tate (5th season)
- Captain: Game captains
- Home stadium: Groves Stadium

1968 Atlantic Coast Conference football standings
	Conf.					Overall
Team	W		L		T	W		L		T
NC State $	6	–	1	–	0	6	–	4	–	0
Clemson	4	–	1	–	1	4	–	5	–	1
Virginia	4	–	2	–	0	7	–	3	–	0
South Carolina	4	–	3	–	0	4	–	6	–	0
Duke	3	–	4	–	0	4	–	6	–	0
Wake Forest	2	–	3	–	1	2	–	7	–	1
Maryland	2	–	5	–	0	2	–	8	–	0
North Carolina	1	–	6	–	0	3	–	7	–	0
$ – Conference champion; Virginia's game against Navy counted in the conference standings.

The 1968 Wake Forest Demon Deacons football team was an American football team that represented Wake Forest University during the 1968 NCAA University Division football season. In their fifth season under head coach Bill Tate, the Demon Deacons compiled a 2–7–1 record and finished in sixth place in the Atlantic Coast Conference.

== Schedule ==
Date	Opponent	Site	Result	Attendance	Source
September 14	NC State	Groves Stadium; Winston-Salem, NC (rivalry)	L 6–10	30,000	
September 21	Clemson	Groves Stadium; Winston-Salem, NC	T 20–20	20,221	
October 5	at Minnesota*	Memorial Stadium; Minneapolis, MN	L 19–24	39,277	
October 12	at Virginia Tech*	Lane Stadium; Blacksburg, VA	L 6–7	31,000	
October 19	at No. 5 Purdue*	Ross–Ade Stadium; [West Lafayette, IN	L 27–28	57,694	
October 26	North Carolina	Groves Stadium; Winston-Salem, NC (rivalry)	W 48–31	30,000	
November 2	Maryland	Groves Stadium; Winston-Salem, NC	W 38–14	15,500	
November 9	South Carolina	Groves Stadium; Winston-Salem, NC	L 21–34	16,000	
November 16	at Duke	Wallace Wade Stadium; Durham, NC (rivalry)	L 3–18	17,500	
November 23	at Florida State*	Doak Campbell Stadium; Tallahassee, FL	L 24–42	35,108	
*Non-conference game; Rankings from AP Poll released prior to the game

== Team leaders ==
Category	Team Leader	Att/Cth	Yds
Passing	Freddie Summers	125/250	1,664
Rushing	Freddie Summers	159	439
Receiving	Ron Jurewicz	28	451
