= 1968 Maryland Terrapins football team =

American college football season

1968 Maryland Terrapins football
- Conference: Atlantic Coast Conference
- Record: 2–8 (2–5 ACC)
- Head coach: Bob Ward (2nd season)
- Home stadium: Byrd Stadium

1968 Atlantic Coast Conference football standings
	Conf.					Overall
Team	W		L		T	W		L		T
NC State $	6	–	1	–	0	6	–	4	–	0
Clemson	4	–	1	–	1	4	–	5	–	1
Virginia	4	–	2	–	0	7	–	3	–	0
South Carolina	4	–	3	–	0	4	–	6	–	0
Duke	3	–	4	–	0	4	–	6	–	0
Wake Forest	2	–	3	–	1	2	–	7	–	1
Maryland	2	–	5	–	0	2	–	8	–	0
North Carolina	1	–	6	–	0	3	–	7	–	0
$ – Conference champion; Virginia's game against Navy counted in the conference standings.

The 1968 Maryland Terrapins football team represented the University of Maryland in the 1968 NCAA University Division football season. In their second and final season under head coach Bob Ward, the Terrapins compiled a 2–8 record (2–5 in conference), finished in seventh place in the Atlantic Coast Conference, and were outscored by their opponents 299 to 171. The team's statistical leaders included Alan Pastrana with 1,053 passing yards, Billy Lovett with 963 rushing yards, and Rick Carlson with 359 receiving yards.

== Schedule ==
Date	Opponent	Site	Result	Attendance	Source
September 21	Florida State*	Byrd Stadium; College Park, MD	L 14–24	33,600	
September 28	at Syracuse*	Archbold Stadium; Syracuse, NY	L 14–32	26,591	
October 5	vs. Duke	Foreman Field; Norfolk, VA (Oyster Bowl)	L 28–30	21,000	
October 12	North Carolina	Byrd Stadium; College Park, MD	W 33–24	27,480	
October 19	South Carolina	Byrd Stadium; College Park, MD	W 21–19	28,200	
October 26	at NC State	Carter Stadium; Raleigh, NC	L 11–31	31,000	
November 2	at Wake Forest	Groves Stadium; Winston-Salem, NC	L 14–38	15,500	
November 9	Clemson	Byrd Stadium; College Park, MD	L 0–16	28,596	
November 16	No. 3 Penn State*	Byrd Stadium; College Park, MD (rivalry)	L 13–57	30,000	
November 23	at Virginia	Scott Stadium; Charlottesville, VA (rivalry)	L 23–28	18,000	
*Non-conference game; Rankings from AP Poll released prior to the game

== Roster ==
1968 Maryland Terrapins football team roster
Players
Coaches
Offense

Pos.	#	Name	Class
QB	12	Alan Pastrana	Jr

Defense

Pos.	#	Name	Class
DB	30	Tony Greene	So
LB	58	Dan Kecman	Jr

Special teams

Pos.	#	Name	Class

Head coach

- Bob Ward

Coordinators/assistant coaches

Legend

- (C) Team captain
- (S) Suspended
- (I) Ineligible
- Injured
- Redshirt
