= 1968 NC State Wolfpack football team =

American college football season

1968 NC State Wolfpack football

ACC champion
- Conference: Atlantic Coast Conference
- Record: 6–4 (6–1 ACC)
- Head coach: Earle Edwards (15th season)
- Home stadium: Carter Stadium

1968 Atlantic Coast Conference football standings
	Conf.					Overall
Team	W		L		T	W		L		T
NC State $	6	–	1	–	0	6	–	4	–	0
Clemson	4	–	1	–	1	4	–	5	–	1
Virginia	4	–	2	–	0	7	–	3	–	0
South Carolina	4	–	3	–	0	4	–	6	–	0
Duke	3	–	4	–	0	4	–	6	–	0
Wake Forest	2	–	3	–	1	2	–	7	–	1
Maryland	2	–	5	–	0	2	–	8	–	0
North Carolina	1	–	6	–	0	3	–	7	–	0
$ – Conference champion; Virginia's game against Navy counted in the conference standings.

The 1968 NC State Wolfpack football team represented North Carolina State University during the 1968 NCAA University Division football season. The Wolfpack were led by 15th-year head coach Earle Edwards and played their home games at Carter Stadium in Raleigh, North Carolina. They competed as members of the Atlantic Coast Conference, winning the conference with a record of 6–1. The Wolfpack had an overall record of 6–4 and were not invited to a bowl game.

== Schedule ==
Date	Opponent	Site	Result	Attendance	Source
September 14	at Wake Forest	Groves Stadium; Winston-Salem, NC (rivalry)	W 10–6	30,000	
September 21	at North Carolina	Kenan Memorial Stadium; Chapel Hill, NC (rivalry)	W 38–6	45,500	
September 28	at Oklahoma*	Oklahoma Memorial Stadium; Norman, OK	L 14–28	53,349	
October 5	at SMU*	Cotton Bowl; Dallas, TX	L 14–35	38,000	
October 12	South Carolina	Carter Stadium; Raleigh, NC	W 36–12	33,400	
October 19	Virginia	Carter Stadium; Raleigh, NC	W 19–0	22,800	
October 26	Maryland	Carter Stadium; Raleigh, NC	W 31–11	31,000	
November 2	Clemson	Carter Stadium; Raleigh, NC (rivalry)	L 19–24	31,183	
November 9	at Duke	Wallace Wade Stadium; Durham, NC (rivalry)	W 17–15	25,000	
November 16	Florida State*	Carter Stadium; Raleigh, NC	L 7–48	26,800	
*Non-conference game
