= 1970 All-Atlantic Coast Conference football team =

Articles on selection of players for the 1970 All-Atlantic Cost Conference

The 1970 All-Atlantic Coast Conference football team consists of American football players chosen by various selectors for their All-Atlantic Coast Conference ("ACC") teams for the 1970 NCAA University Division football season. Selectors in 1970 included the Associated Press (AP).

== All-Atlantic Coast Conference selections ==
=== Offensive selections ===
==== Ends ====
- Wes Chesson, Duke (AP)
- Jim Mitchell, South Carolina (AP)

==== Offensive tackles ====
- Paul Hoolahan, North Carolina (AP)
- Dave DeCamilla, South Carolina (AP)

==== Offensive guards ====
- Dave Thompson, Clemson (AP)
- Bill Bobbora, Wake Forest (AP)

==== Centers ====
- Dan Ryczek, Virginia (AP)

==== Backs ====
- Don McCauley, North Carolina (AP)
- Leo Hart, Duke (AP)
- Larry Hopkins, Wake Forest (AP)
- Larry Russell, Wake Forest (AP)

=== Defensive selections ===
==== Defensive ends ====
- Guy Roberts, Maryland (AP)
- Bruce Mills, Duke (AP)

==== Defensive tackles ====
- Win Headley, Wake Forest (AP)
- Flip Ray, North Carolina (AP)

==== Linebackers ====
- Dick Biddle, Duke (AP)
- George Smith, NC State (AP)
- Ed Stetz, Wake Forest (AP)

==== Defensive backs ====
- Dick Harris, South Carolina (AP)
- Jack Whitley, NC State (AP)
- Rick Searl, Duke (AP)
- Don Kelley, Clemson (AP)

=== Special teams ===
==== Kickers ====
- Tracy Lounsbury, Wake Forest (AP)

== Key ==
AP = Associated Press

== See also ==
- 1970 College Football All-America Team
