= Fairfax Historic District (Valley, Alabama) =

Historic district in Alabama, United States

- U.S. National Register of Historic Places
- Alabama Register of Landmarks and Heritage
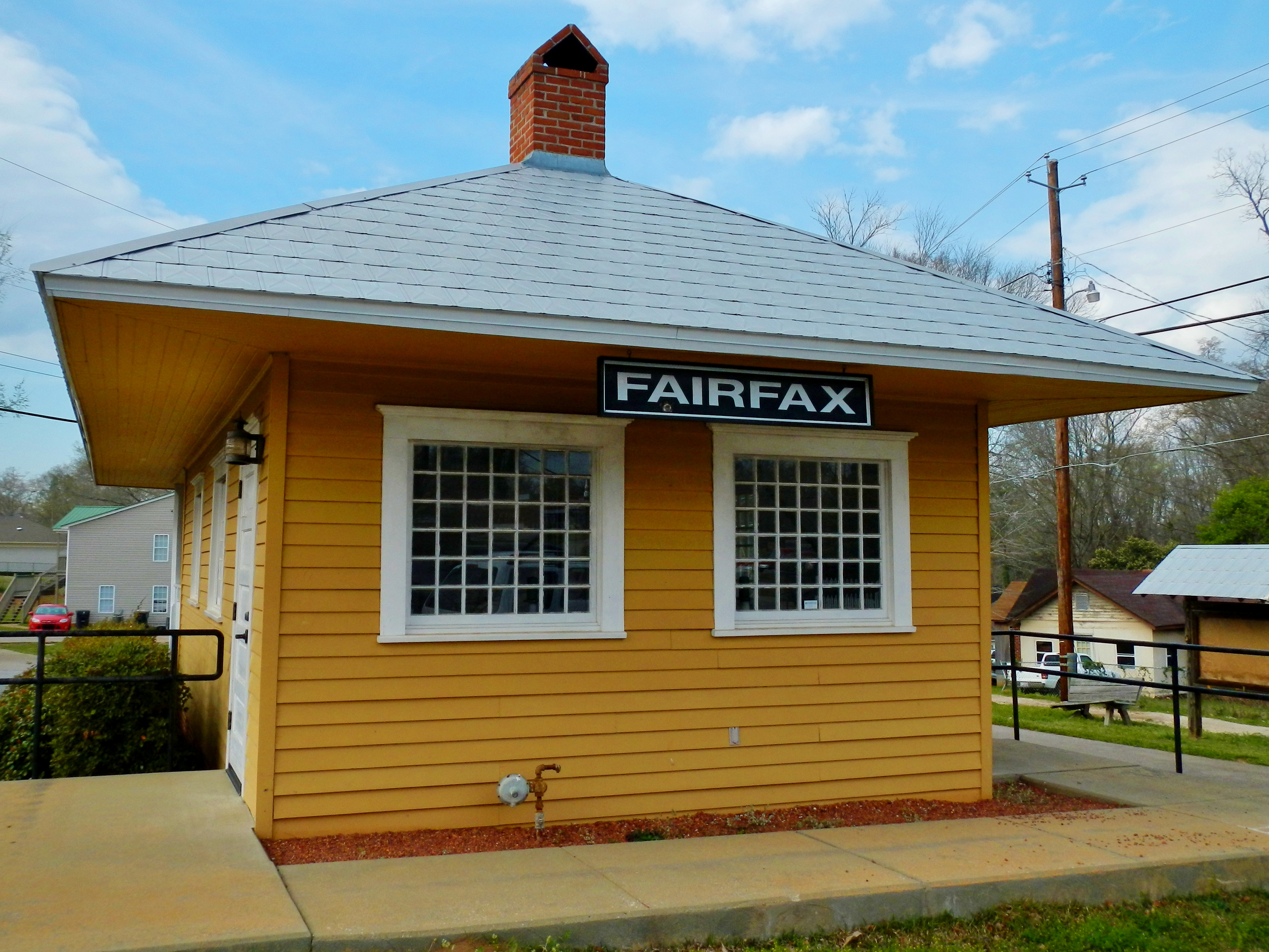

- Location within Alabama Location within the United States
- Location: Roughly bounded by River Road, Spring Street, Lamer Street, Derson Street, Combs Street, and Cussetta Road, Valley, Alabama
- Coordinates: 32.793056°N 85.180833°W
- Area: 240 acres (97 ha)
- Built by: Galveston Construction Company
- Architect: Mr. Agnew (mill building); William B. Marquis, (village layout)
- Architectural style: Colonial Revival, Bungalow/Craftsman
- MPS: Valley, Alabama, and the West Point Manufacturing Company MPS
- NRHP reference No.: 99001177

Significant dates
- Added to NRHP: September 24, 1999
- Designated ARLH: December 19, 1991

The Fairfax Historic District in Valley, Alabama, United States, was listed on the National Register of Historic Places in 1999.

It is a 240-acre (97 ha) area roughly bounded by River Road, Spring Street, Lamer Street, Derson Street, Combs Street, and Cussetta Road in Valley. The district includes 372 contributing buildings, a contributing structure, and four contributing sites.

The district is centered around a textile mill and the surrounding buildings, the majority of which are mill worker cottages. Other building include commercial, civic, recreational, and civic structures. The architect of the mill was a Mr. Agnew (or Agnue). The village was designed by landscape architect William B. Marquis, who later became a partner at Olmsted Brothers. Architectural styles include Colonial Revival, and Bungalow/Craftsman.
