= Leo Hart =

American football player (born 1949)

- Hart in 1972

No. 10
- Position: Quarterback

Personal information
- Born: March 3, 1949 (age 77); Kinston, North Carolina, U.S.
- Listed height: 6 ft 3 in (1.91 m)
- Listed weight: 203 lb (92 kg)

Career information
- High school: Grainger (Kinston, NC)
- College: Duke
- NFL draft: 1971: 3rd round, 59th overall pick

Career history
- Atlanta Falcons (1971); Buffalo Bills (1972)

Awards and highlights
- 3× First-team All-ACC (1968, 1969, 1970)

Career NFL statistics
- Passing attempts: 16
- Passing completions: 6
- Completion percentage: 37.5%
- TD–INT: 0–3
- Passing yards: 53
- Passer rating: 7.6
- Stats at Pro Football Reference

Marion Leo Hart (born March 3, 1949) is an American former professional football player who was a quarterback in the National Football League (NFL). He played college football for the Duke Blue Devils and was selected in the third round of the 1971 NFL draft. He played in the NFL for the Atlanta Falcons and Buffalo Bills.

According to the Duke University athletic department, "Leo Hart stands as one of the most decorated football players in Duke History. The strong armed quarterback virtually re-wrote the Duke and ACC record books during his playing days with the Blue Devils."

He is a member of the Duke Sports and North Carolina Sports Halls of Fame.

== Biography ==
=== Early life ===
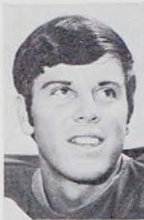
Hart with the Duke Blue Devils, c. 1970

Hart went to Grainger High School in Kinston, North Carolina. He played college football at Duke University, where he was a three time All-Atlantic Coast Conference selection 1968-1970. He was selected as a Duke most valuable player 1969-1970 (as a junior and as a senior). While at Duke, Hart passed for a record 6,116 yards and held an ACC record 487 pass completions. At Duke Leo was a member of Phi Delt fraternity.

=== NFL career ===
Despite his outstanding collegiate career, Hart's time in the National Football League (NFL) was short and uneventful. Drafted in the third round of the 1971 NFL draft by the Atlanta Falcons, who used the 59th overall pick to select him, Hart saw action in only one game during his 1971 rookie year. In that contest against the New Orleans Saints, Hart was on the field for just five plays, throwing one incomplete pass.

The Falcons went to the well for a new quarterback again in the 1972 NFL draft, however, selecting Heisman Trophy winner Pat Sullivan of Auburn University and Hart was released by the Falcons just two days ahead of the 1972 NFL season. He was signed first by the Los Angeles Rams as a free agent. The Rams subsequently waived him, however, and he was claimed off the waiver wire by the Buffalo Bills, for whom he saw action in the 1972 season.

Hart's fleeting opportunity came on December 3 against the Baltimore Colts. Bills starting quarterback Dennis Shaw had been concussed early in the 4th quarter of the team's previous game against the Cleveland Browns, and head coach Lou Saban turned to the 23-year old Hart to step into the void as a starter.

"I've done little but watch others since I've come into pro football," Hart told a reporter ahead of the game, adding "I'm just happy about this opportunity — I hope I can take advantage of it."

The Colts were a formidable foe for the Bills, having blanked the upstate New Yorkers three times in a row — by scores of 43-0, 24-0, and 17-0 — coming into Hart's December 3 trial by fire. Unfortunately, things went just as poorly as they could have gone, with the inexperienced QB throwing a pair of first quarter picks to Colts safeties Jerry Logan and Rick Volk. Star Buffalo running back O.J. Simpson was held to his worst game of the season, picking up just 26 yards on 14 carries in a 35–7 drubbing that was never close. Hart went 4-for-9 for just 31 yards and the 2 interceptions before being lifted for Shaw, who went 10-for-15 for 150 and 1 pick in the losing effort.

For the year Hart was 6-for-15 passing, for 54 yards with 3 interceptions.

He remained on the Buffalo roster for the 1973 but never appeared in a regular season game for the team. On April 26, 1974, Hart was traded to the New York Giants for a draft pick, but he never played for the team, thereby ending his NFL career.

=== Post career ===
Leo Hart and Dr. Frank Bassett were two pivotal players in spearheading the Duke Football Campaign, which was the fund-raising effort for the Yoh Football Center. Over half of all donations (approximately $8 million) that made the building possible came from former Blue Devil football players. This $22 million complex opened in August 2002.

=== Personal life ===
Leo is married to Glenda Brodrick Hart.

In 1988 Hart was inducted into Duke Sports Hall of Fame. Hart was inducted into the Kinston/Lenoir County Sports Hall of Fame in 2004. In 2008 he became a member of the North Carolina Sports Hall of Fame.
