= 1969 All-Atlantic Coast Conference football team =

American college football all-star team

The 1969 All-Atlantic Coast Conference football team consists of American football players chosen by various selectors for their All-Atlantic Coast Conference ("ACC") teams for the 1969 NCAA University Division football season. Selectors in 1969 included the Associated Press (AP).

== All-Atlantic Coast Conference selections ==
=== Offensive selections ===
==== Ends ====
- Charlie Waters, Clemson (AP)
- Fred Zeigler, South Carolina (AP)

==== Offensive tackles ====
- Dave DeCamilla, South Carolina (AP)
- Ralph Sonntag, Maryland (AP)

==== Offensive guards ====
- Ed Chalupka, North Carolina (AP)
- Don Jordan, NC State (AP)

==== Centers ====
- Joe Dobner, Wake Forest (AP)

==== Backs ====
- Leo Hart, Duke (AP)
- Don McCauley, North Carolina (AP)
- Ray Yauger, Clemson (AP)
- Warren Muir, South Carolina (AP)

=== Defensive selections ===
==== Defensive ends ====
- Judge Mattocks, North Carolina (AP)
- Ivan Southerland, Clemson (AP)

==== Defensive tackles ====
- Ron Carpenter, NC State (AP)
- Jimmy Poston, South Carolina (AP)

==== Linebackers ====
- Bill Richardson, North Carolina (AP)
- John Mazalewski, Wake Forest (AP)
- Mike Hilka, NC State (AP)

==== Defensive backs ====
- Pat Watson, South Carolina (AP)
- Jack Whitley, NC State (AP)
- Rick Searl, Duke (AP)
- Gary Young, NC State (AP)

=== Special teams ===
==== Kickers ====
- Billy Dupre, South Carolina (AP)

== Key ==
AP = Associated Press

== See also ==
- 1969 College Football All-America Team
