= Wes Chesson =

American football player (born 1949)

- Chesson in 1972

No. 81, 21
- Position: Wide receiver

Personal information
- Born: January 15, 1949 (age 77); Edenton, North Carolina, U.S.
- Listed height: 6 ft 2 in (1.88 m)
- Listed weight: 195 lb (88 kg)

Career information
- High school: John A. Holmes (Edenton)
- College: Duke
- NFL draft: 1971: 7th round, 163rd overall pick

Career history
- Atlanta Falcons (1971–1973); Philadelphia Eagles (1973–1974)

Awards and highlights
- First-team All-ACC (1970)

Career NFL statistics
- Games played: 43
- Starts: 29
- Receiving yards: 598 (15.0 average)
- Touchdowns: 2
- Stats at Pro Football Reference

Wes Chesson (born January 15, 1949) is an American former professional football player who was a wide receiver for the Atlanta Falcons and Philadelphia Eagles of the National Football League (NFL). He played college football for the Duke Blue Devils and was a member of the 1970 All-Atlantic Coast Conference football team.
