= Roy Reeves =

American football player (born 1946)

No. 28, 32
- Position: Wide receiver

Personal information
- Born: February 8, 1946 (age 80); Americus, Georgia, U.S.
- Listed height: 6 ft 0 in (1.83 m)
- Listed weight: 182 lb (83 kg)

Career information
- High school: Americus
- College: South Carolina (1964-1968)
- NFL draft: 1969: 14th round, 352nd overall pick

Career history
- Buffalo Bills (1969); BC Lions (1970)

Career AFL statistics
- Return yards: 3
- Stats at Pro Football Reference

Roy Don Reeves (born February 8, 1946) is an American former professional football player who was a wide receiver for the Buffalo Bills of the American Football League (NFL) in 1969. He played college football for the South Carolina Gamecocks.
