= 1968 All-Atlantic Coast Conference football team =

American college football all-star team

The 1968 All-Atlantic Coast Conference football team consists of American football players chosen by various selectors for their All-Atlantic Coast Conference ("ACC") teams for the 1968 NCAA University Division football season. Selectors in 1968 included the Associated Press (AP).

== All-Atlantic Coast Conference selections ==
=== Offensive selections ===
==== Ends ====
- Henley Carter, Duke (AP)
- Fred Zeigler, South Carolina (AP)

==== Offensive tackles ====
- Joe Lhotsky, Clemson (AP)
- Greg Shelly, Virginia (AP)

==== Offensive guards ====
- Chuck Hammer, Virginia (AP)
- Don Jordan, NC State (AP)

==== Centers ====
- Carey Metts, NC State (AP)

==== Backs ====
- Buddy Gore, Clemson (AP)
- Frank Quayle, Virginia (AP)
- Leo Hart, Duke (AP)
- Bobby Hall, NC State (AP)

=== Defensive selections ===
==== Defensive ends ====
- Mark Capuano, NC State (AP)
- Ronnie Duckworth, Clemson (AP)

==== Defensive tackles ====
- Ron Carpenter, NC State (AP)
- John Cagle, Clemson (AP)

==== Middle guards ====
- Bob Paczkoski, Virginia (AP)

==== Linebackers ====
- Jimmy Catoe, Clemson (AP)
- Dick Biddle, Duke (AP)

==== Defensive backs ====
- Jack Whitley, NC State (AP)
- Digit Laughridge, Wake Forest (AP)
- Wally Orrel, South Carolina (AP)
- Gary Yount, NC State (AP)

=== Special teams ===
==== Kickers ====
- Gerald Warren, NC State (AP)

== Key ==
AP = Associated Press

== See also ==
- 1968 College Football All-America Team
