= Langdale Historic District =

Historic district in Alabama, United States

- U.S. National Register of Historic Places
- U.S. Historic district
- Alabama Register of Landmarks and Heritage
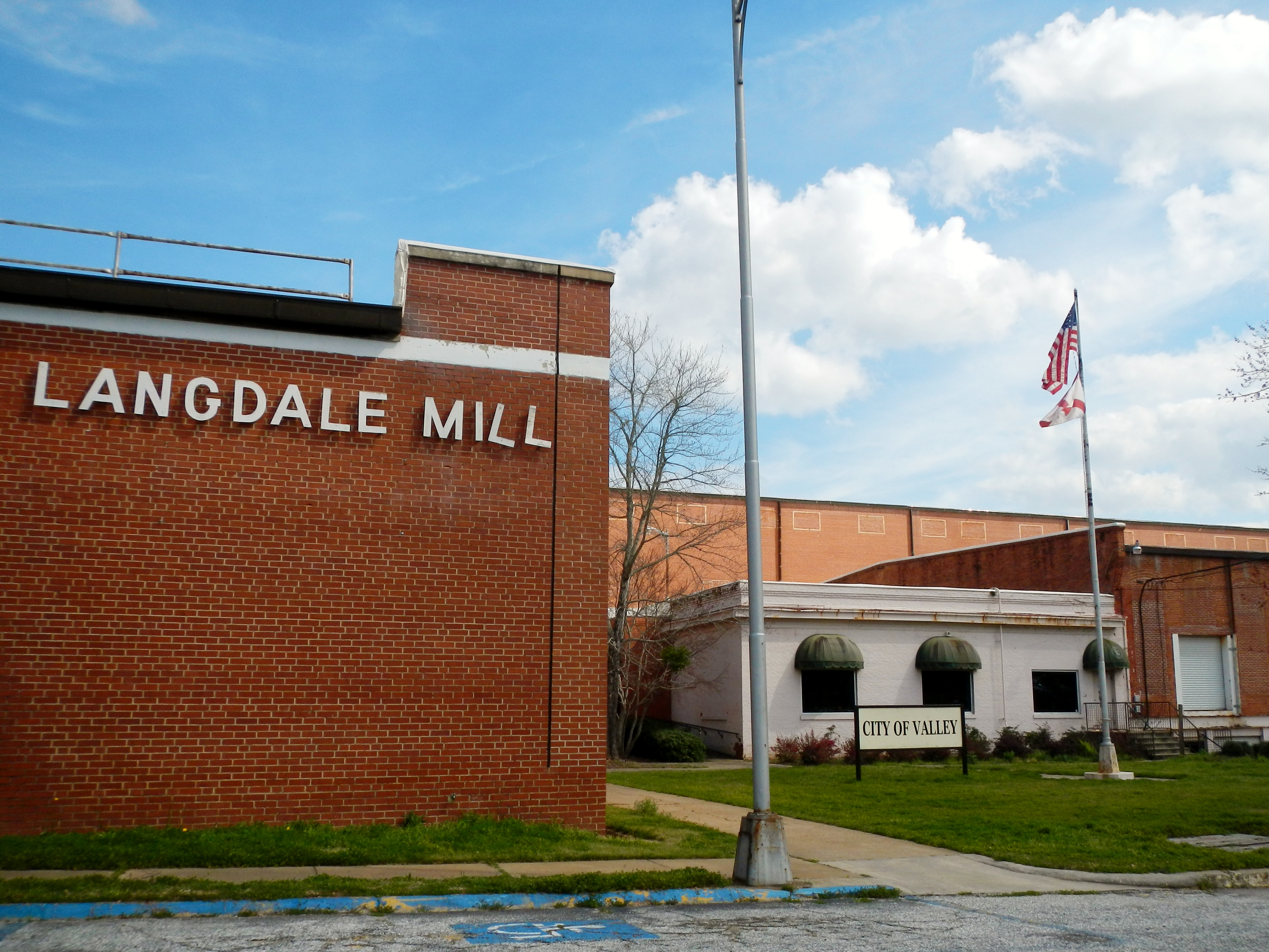
- Langdale Mill in 2012

- Location within Alabama Location within the United States
- Location: Roughly bounded by 65th St., 20th Ave., 61st, 58th, and 55th Sts., 16th Ave., and Chattahoochie R., Valley, Alabama
- Coordinates: 32°48′43″N 85°10′13″W
- Built: 1885
- Architectural style: Bungalow/Craftsman, Colonial Revival
- MPS: Valley, Alabama, and the West Point Manufacturing Company MPS
- NRHP reference No.: 99001299

Significant dates
- Added to NRHP: November 12, 1999
- Designated ARLH: July 22, 1991

Langdale Historic District is a historic district in Valley, Alabama, and Harris County, Georgia, United States. It was listed on the Alabama Register of Landmarks and Heritage on July 22, 1991, and the National Register of Historic Places (NRHP) on November 12, 1999. It lies primarily in Valley, Alabama, on the west side of the Chattahoochee River.

== See also ==
- Riverview Historic District, located nearby
