= Valley, Alabama =

City in Alabama, United States

Valley
- City
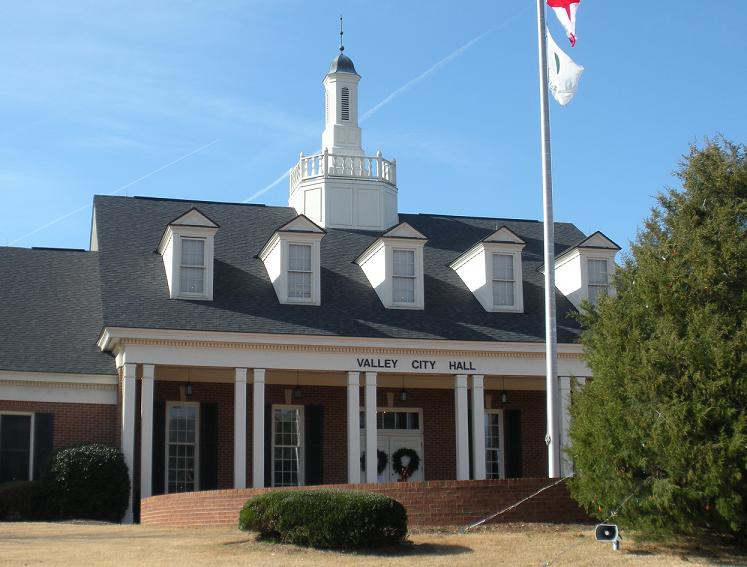
- Valley City Hall

- Location of Valley in Chambers County, Alabama.
- Coordinates: 32°45′51″N 85°12′23″W
- Country: United States
- State: Alabama
- County: Chambers
- Established: 1980

Area
  - City: 12.89 sq mi (33.38 km^{2})
  - Land: 12.89 sq mi (33.38 km^{2})
  - Water: 0 sq mi (0.00 km^{2})
- Elevation: 591 ft (180 m)

Population (2020)
  - City: 10,529
  - Density: 816.9/sq mi (315.39/km^{2})
  - Urban: 20,466
- Time zone: UTC-5 (EST)
  - Summer (DST): UTC-4 (EDT)
- ZIP code: 36854
- Area code: 334
- FIPS code: 01-78204
- GNIS feature ID: 2405634
- Website: www.cityofvalley.com

Valley is a city in Chambers County, Alabama, United States. Valley was incorporated in 1980 combining the four textile mill villages of Fairfax, Langdale, River View, and Shawmut. As of the 2020 census it had a population of 10,529. The city lies on the western bank of the Chattahoochee River, the state border between Alabama and Georgia. Valley is a pilot city for the Alabama Communities of Excellence program, a non-profit that partners with governments, businesses, and universities to prepare participating communities for a more vibrant future. It is included in the LaGrange, Georgia Micropolitan Statistical Area, which is included in the Greater Atlanta Combined Statistical Area.

== Geography ==
Valley is located in southeastern Chambers County. According to the U.S. Census Bureau, the city has a total area of 11.0 square miles (28.6 km^{2}), all land.

The city is located on the Alabama-Georgia state line. Interstate 85 runs through its northern city limits, with access from exits 77 and 79. Via I-85, Atlanta is 84 mi (135 km) northeast and Montgomery is 79 mi (127 km) southwest. U.S. Route 29 also runs through the city, connecting the city to Lanett and West Point, Georgia to the north and leading southwest 19 mi (31 km) to Opelika.

Valley has a larger Micropolitan Statistical Area known as the "Greater Valley Area" consisting of the three largest cities of Chambers County: Valley, Lanett, and LaFayette. It also includes the city of West Point, Georgia.

== Climate ==
The climate in this area is characterized by hot, humid summers and generally mild to cool winters. According to the Köppen Climate Classification system, Valley has a humid subtropical climate, abbreviated "Cfa" on climate maps.

Climate data for Valley, 1991–2020 simulated normals (574 ft elevation)
| Month | Jan | Feb | Mar | Apr | May | Jun | Jul | Aug | Sep | Oct | Nov | Dec | Year |
|---|---|---|---|---|---|---|---|---|---|---|---|---|---|
| Mean daily maximum °F (°C) | 56.5 (13.6) | 60.4 (15.8) | 68.2 (20.1) | 75.2 (24.0) | 82.4 (28.0) | 88.0 (31.1) | 90.9 (32.7) | 90.0 (32.2) | 85.3 (29.6) | 76.1 (24.5) | 66.6 (19.2) | 58.6 (14.8) | 74.9 (23.8) |
| Daily mean °F (°C) | 45.1 (7.3) | 48.6 (9.2) | 55.6 (13.1) | 62.4 (16.9) | 70.7 (21.5) | 77.5 (25.3) | 80.6 (27.0) | 79.9 (26.6) | 74.8 (23.8) | 64.4 (18.0) | 54.1 (12.3) | 47.7 (8.7) | 63.5 (17.5) |
| Mean daily minimum °F (°C) | 33.8 (1.0) | 36.9 (2.7) | 43.0 (6.1) | 49.8 (9.9) | 59.2 (15.1) | 67.1 (19.5) | 70.3 (21.3) | 69.8 (21.0) | 64.4 (18.0) | 52.7 (11.5) | 41.9 (5.5) | 36.5 (2.5) | 52.1 (11.2) |
| Average precipitation inches (mm) | 4.99 (126.77) | 4.81 (122.30) | 5.18 (131.63) | 4.42 (112.38) | 3.71 (94.36) | 4.18 (106.11) | 4.89 (124.26) | 4.11 (104.28) | 3.56 (90.36) | 3.32 (84.30) | 4.03 (102.46) | 5.24 (133.00) | 52.44 (1,332.21) |
| Average dew point °F (°C) | 35.4 (1.9) | 38.1 (3.4) | 43.2 (6.2) | 50.4 (10.2) | 59.5 (15.3) | 67.3 (19.6) | 70.5 (21.4) | 70.2 (21.2) | 65.1 (18.4) | 54.7 (12.6) | 44.4 (6.9) | 39.0 (3.9) | 53.2 (11.8) |
Source: Prism Climate Group

== Demographics ==
Historical population
| Census | Pop. | Note | %± |
|---|---|---|---|
| 1980 | 3,776 | | — |
| 1990 | 8,173 | | 116.4% |
| 2000 | 9,198 | | 12.5% |
| 2010 | 9,524 | | 3.5% |
| 2020 | 10,529 | | 10.6% |
U.S. Decennial Census

Valley was first listed as a census designated place in the 1980 U.S. census under the name Fairfax (see Fairfax Historic District). The community was incorporated as Valley prior to the 1990 U.S. census.

=== Racial and ethnic composition ===
Valley city, Alabama – Racial and ethnic composition Note: the US Census treats Hispanic/Latino as an ethnic category. This table excludes Latinos from the racial categories and assigns them to a separate category. Hispanics/Latinos may be of any race.
| Race / Ethnicity (NH = Non-Hispanic) | Pop 1980 | Pop 1990 | Pop 2000 | Pop 2010 | Pop 2020 | % 1980 | % 1990 | % 2000 | % 2010 | % 2020 |
|---|---|---|---|---|---|---|---|---|---|---|
| White alone (NH) | 2,219 | 6,725 | 6,402 | 6,010 | 5,711 | 58.77% | 82.28% | 69.60% | 63.10% | 54.24% |
| Black or African American alone (NH) | 1,557 | 1,409 | 2,626 | 3,140 | 3,742 | 41.23% | 17.24% | 28.55% | 32.97% | 35.54% |
| Native American or Alaska Native alone (NH) | 0 | 14 | 12 | 7 | 5 | 0.00% | 0.17% | 0.13% | 0.07% | 0.05% |
| Asian alone (NH) | 0 | 0 | 32 | 111 | 275 | 0.00% | 0.00% | 0.35% | 1.17% | 2.61% |
| Native Hawaiian or Pacific Islander alone (NH) | x | x | 0 | 6 | 4 | x | x | 0.00% | 0.06% | 0.04% |
| Other race alone (NH) | 0 | 1 | 6 | 3 | 77 | 0.00% | 0.01% | 0.07% | 0.03% | 0.73% |
| Mixed race or Multiracial (NH) | x | x | 43 | 85 | 328 | x | x | 0.47% | 0.89% | 3.12% |
| Hispanic or Latino (any race) | 0 | 24 | 77 | 162 | 387 | 0.00% | 0.29% | 0.84% | 1.70% | 3.68% |
| Total | 3,776 | 8,173 | 9,198 | 9,524 | 10,529 | 100.00% | 100.00% | 100.00% | 100.00% | 100.00% |

=== 2020 census ===
As of the 2020 census, Valley had a population of 10,529. The median age was 40.0 years. 20.9% of residents were under the age of 18 and 18.8% of residents were 65 years of age or older. For every 100 females there were 90.7 males, and for every 100 females age 18 and over there were 87.5 males age 18 and over.

86.9% of residents lived in urban areas, while 13.1% lived in rural areas.

There were 4,336 households in Valley, including 2,228 families. Of all households, 28.5% had children under the age of 18 living in them, 36.3% were married-couple households, 22.2% were households with a male householder and no spouse or partner present, and 34.4% were households with a female householder and no spouse or partner present. About 30.5% of all households were made up of individuals and 12.9% had someone living alone who was 65 years of age or older.

There were 4,910 housing units, of which 11.7% were vacant. The homeowner vacancy rate was 2.2% and the rental vacancy rate was 11.1%.

=== 2010 census ===
As of the census of 2010, there were 9,524 people, 3,878 households, and 2,561 families residing in the city. The population density was 864 inhabitants per square mile (334/km^{2}). There were 5,025 housing units at an average density of 457 per square mile (176/km^{2}). The racial makeup of the city was 64.0% White, 33.0% Black or African American, 0.1% Native American, 1.2% Asian, 0.6% from other races, and 1.1% from two or more races. 1.7% of the population were Hispanic or Latino of any race.

There were 3,878 households, out of which 26.7% had children under the age of 18 living with them, 42.2% were married couples living together, 18.6% had a female householder with no husband present, and 34.0% were non-families. 30.5% of all households were made up of individuals, and 13.3% had someone living alone who was 65 years of age or older. The average household size was 2.43 and the average family size was 3.02.

In the city, the population was spread out, with 23.9% under the age of 18, 7.9% from 18 to 24, 26.2% from 25 to 44, 25.3% from 45 to 64, and 16.7% who were 65 years of age or older. The median age was 39.3 years. For every 100 females, there were 88.1 males. For every 100 females age 18 and over, there were 89.7 males.

The median income for a household in the city was $31,501, and the median income for a family was $40,013. Males had a median income of $36,345 versus $29,905 for females. The per capita income for the city was $15,928. About 18.2% of families and 20.7% of the population were below the poverty line, including 28.4% of those under age 18 and 12.9% of those age 65 or over.

== Media ==
Valley is served by the Columbus, Georgia Television Designated Market Area (DMA).

== Notable people ==
- Jennifer Chandler, Olympic gold medal winner in diving at the 1976 Summer Olympics in Montreal
- John Copeland, former NFL player
- Josh Evans, former NFL player
- Drew Ferguson, member of the United States House of Representatives from Georgia's 3rd congressional district
- Matt Foster, pitcher for the Chicago White Sox
- Lemanski Hall, former NFL player
- Bill McGhee, former player for the Philadelphia Athletics
- Marcus Pollard, former NFL player
- Mike Potts, former pitcher for the Milwaukee Brewers
- K. Lee Scott, Christian composer
- Jylan Ware, NFL player

== Photo gallery ==
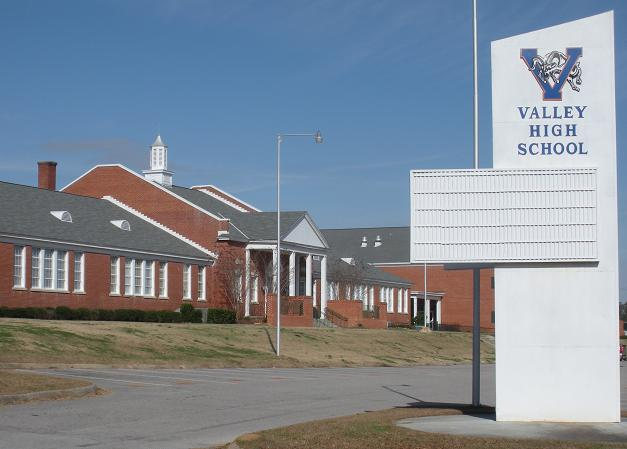
Valley High School

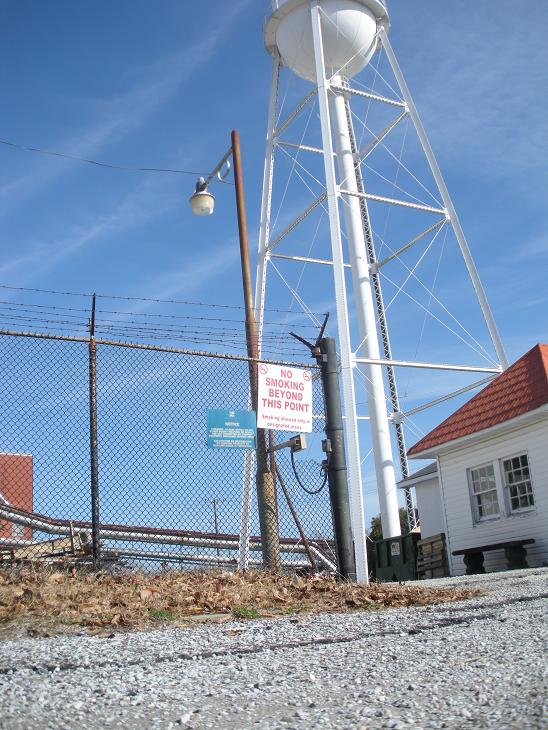
Entrance to the West Point Stevens textile plant

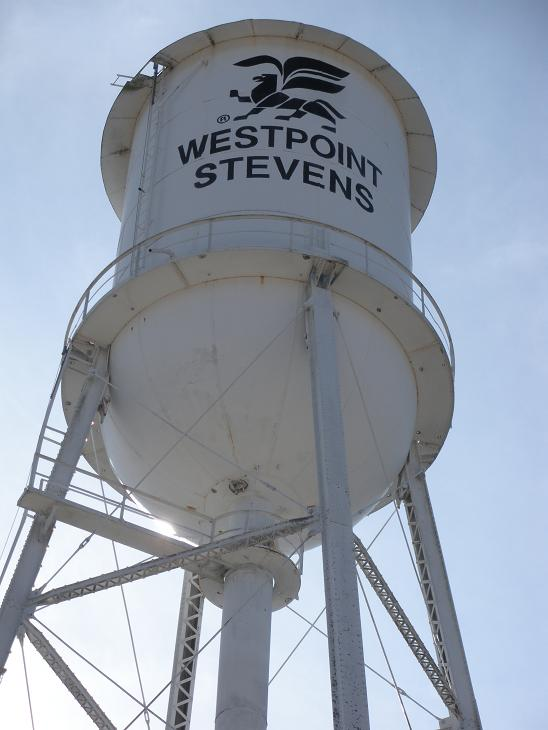
Water tower at the West Point Stevens textile plant
