= Shirabad =

Shirabad or Shir-Abad (Persian: شیرآباد) may refer to:

- Shirabad Waterfall, Iran
- Shirabad, Afghanistan
- Shirabad, Uzbekistan
- Parakar, Armenia, formerly Shirabad
- Shirabad, Gilan, a village in Talesh County, Gilan Province, Iran
- Shirabad Mahalleh, a village in Talesh County, Gilan Province, Iran
- Shirabad, East Azerbaijan, a village in Heris County, East Azerbaijan Province, Iran
- Shirabad, Golestan, a village in Ramian County, Golestan Province, Iran
- Shirabad, Hamadan, a village in Hamadan County, Hamadan Province, Iran
- Shirabad, Nahavand, a village in Nahavand County, Hamadan Province, Iran
- Shirabad, Kerman, a village in Rigan County, Kerman Province, Iran
- Shirabad, Kermanshah, a village in Sonqor County, Kermanshah Province, Iran
- Shirabad, Maneh and Samalqan, a village in North Khorasan Province, Iran
- Shirabad, Shirvan, a village in North Khorasan Province, Iran
- Shirabad, Razavi Khorasan, a village in Razavi Khorasan Province, Iran
- Shirabad, Irandegan, a village in Khash County, Sistan and Baluchestan Province, Iran
- Shirabad, South Khorasan, a village in South Khorasan Province, Iran
- Shirabad, West Azerbaijan, a village in West Azerbaijan Province, Iran

== See also ==
- Sherabad (disambiguation)
- Shir (disambiguation)
