= Bashirabad =

Bashirabad (Persian: بشیرآباد) may refer to:

== India ==
- Basheerabad, Andhra Pradesh

== Iran ==
- Bashirabad, Bushehr
- Bashirabad, Fars
- Bashirabad, Hamadan
- Bashirabad, Kermanshah
- Bashirabad-e Bati, Kermanshah Province
- Bashirabad, Razavi Khorasan
- Bashirabad, Sistan and Baluchestan
