= 1968 Gator Bowl =

American college football game

Missouri Tigers	Alabama Crimson Tide
(7–3)	(8–2)
Big Eight	SEC
35	10
Head coach: Dan Devine	Head coach: Bear Bryant
AP / Coaches; 16 / 17	AP / Coaches; 12 / 12
	1	2	3	4	Total
Missouri	7	7	0	21	35
Alabama	0	7	0	3	10
- Date: December 28, 1968
- Season: 1968
- Stadium: Gator Bowl Stadium
- Location: Jacksonville, Florida
- MVP: Terry McMillan, (QB, Missouri) & Mike Hall (LB, Alabama)
- Referee: E.D. Cavette (SEC; split crew: SEC, Big Eight)
- Attendance: 68,011

The 1968 Gator Bowl, part of the 1968 bowl game season, took place on December 28, 1968, at the Gator Bowl Stadium in Jacksonville, Florida. The competing teams were the Missouri Tigers, representing the Big Eight Conference, and the Alabama Crimson Tide, representing the Southeastern Conference (SEC).

The game featured two eventual College Football Hall of Fame coaches, Dan Devine at Missouri and Bear Bryant at Alabama. Missouri won the game, 35–10.

== Teams ==
=== Missouri ===
Missouri finished the regular season with a record of 7–3, with losses to Kentucky, Oklahoma and Kansas. Following the team's loss against Oklahoma, Missouri accepted an invitation to play in the Gator Bowl on November 18. The appearance marked the third for Missouri in the Gator Bowl, and the school's 11th overall bowl game.

=== Alabama ===
The 1968 Alabama squad finished the regular season with an 8–2 record, with its two losses coming by a combined three points to Ole Miss and Tennessee. Following the team's victory over Miami, Alabama accepted an invitation to play in the Gator Bowl on November 20. The appearance marked the first for Alabama in the Gator Bowl, and the school's 22nd overall bowl game.

== Game summary ==
The Missouri Tigers scored first, with a Terry McMillan 4-yard touchdown run to complete an eleven-play, 71-yard drive to take a 7–0 lead.

In the second quarter, Alabama scored their only touchdown of the game after Donnie Sutton intercepted a McMillan pass and returned it 38 yards for a touchdown to tie the game at 7–7. Missouri retook the lead late in the second when McMillan scored from five yards out to give the Tigers a 14–7 lead at the half. After a scoreless third quarter, the Crimson Tide scored their final points of the game on a 28-yard field goal by Mike Dean to cut the Missouri lead to 14–10. Missouri responded with three touchdowns to put the game out of reach. The first score was set up after Roger Wehrli intercepted a Neb Hayden pass and returned it to the Bama 21 yard line. Four plays later, McMillan scored his third touchdown of the game on a two-yard run. Greg Cook scored next on a 35-yard touchdown run and Dennis Poppe had the final points after returning a Scott Hunter pass 47 yards for a touchdown.

For the game, Missouri completed zero passes, but they rushed for 402 yards and they outgained the Crimson Tide 402 yards to 132. The 25-point loss was the worst for Alabama in its 22 bowl game history, and the 35 points Missouri scored were the most Alabama had ever surrendered in a bowl game.

Scoring summary

Quarter	Time	Drive			Team	Scoring information	Score	
Quarter	Time	Plays	Yards	TOP	Team	Scoring information	Missouri	Alabama
1		11	71		Missouri	Terry McMillan 4-yard touchdown run, Bill Sangster kick good	7	0
2					Alabama	Interception returned 38 yards for touchdown by Donnie Sutton, Mike Dean kick good	7	7
2	3:03		57		Missouri	Terry McMillan 5-yard touchdown run, Bill Sangster kick good	14	7
4					Alabama	28-yard field goal by Mike Dean	14	10
4		4	21		Missouri	Terry McMillan 2-yard touchdown run, Bill Sangster kick good	21	10
4		1	35		Missouri	Greg Cook 35-yard touchdown run, Bill Sangster kick good	28	10
4					Missouri	Interception returned 47 yards for touchdown by Dennis Poppe, Bill Sangster kick good	35	10
"TOP" = time of possession. For other American football terms, see Glossary of American football.							35	10
