= Shira =

Shira may refer to:

== Geography ==
- Shira, or Sira, Karnataka, a taluk in Karnataka, India
- Shira, Iran, a village in Mazandaran Province
- Shira, Nigeria, a Local Government Area of Bauchi State
- Shira, Russia, a rural locality (selo) in Shirinsky District, Republic of Khakassia, Russia
  - Shira (railway station)
- Lake Shira, near Shira, Russia
- River Shira, Argyll and Bute, Scotland
- The western peak of Mount Kilimanjaro

== People ==
- Shira (given name), a list of people with the Hebrew feminine name
- Charles Shira (1926–1976), former head football coach at Mississippi State University
- Nihim D. Shira, 21st century Indian politician
- Shira people, a Punu ethnic group of Gabon

== Other uses ==
- Shira (book), a 1971 novel by Israeli Nobel laureate Shmuel Yosef Agnon, also the title character
- Shira Choir, American Hasidic choir
- Shira, a character in the film Ice Age: Continental Drift
- Shira language, a Bantu language of Gabon
- Shira, or Sajjige, an Indian sweet dish (halva)

== See also ==
- Shiira, a web browser for the Mac OS X operating system
- Shiras, a surname
- She-Ra, the animation series character
