= Shyr =

Shyr is a surname. Notable people with the surname include:

- Howard S.H. Shyr (born 1965), Taiwanese politician
- James C. Shyr (born 1962), Japanese automobile designer

== See also ==
- Shir (disambiguation)
