= 1968 Auburn Tigers football team =

American college football season

1968 Auburn Tigers football

Sun Bowl champion

Sun Bowl, W 34–10 vs. Arizona
- Conference: Southeastern Conference

Ranking
- AP: No. 16
- Record: 7–4 (4–2 SEC)
- Head coach: Ralph Jordan (18th season)
- Home stadium: Cliff Hare Stadium; Legion Field

1968 Southeastern Conference football standings
	Conf.					Overall
Team	W		L		T	W		L		T
No. 8 Georgia $	5	–	0	–	1	8	–	1	–	2
No. 13 Tennessee	4	–	1	–	1	8	–	2	–	1
No. 17 Alabama	4	–	2	–	0	8	–	3	–	0
No. 19 LSU	4	–	2	–	0	8	–	3	–	0
No. 16 Auburn	4	–	2	–	0	7	–	4	–	0
Ole Miss	3	–	2	–	1	7	–	3	–	1
Florida	3	–	2	–	1	6	–	3	–	1
Vanderbilt	2	–	3	–	1	5	–	4	–	1
Mississippi State	0	–	4	–	2	0	–	8	–	2
Kentucky	0	–	7	–	0	3	–	7	–	0
$ – Conference champion; LSU, Florida, and Vanderbilt's games against Tulane; LSU's game against TCU; and Mississippi State's game against Texas Tech counted in the conference standings.; Rankings from AP Poll

The 1968 Auburn Tigers football team represented Auburn University in the 1968 NCAA University Division football season. It was the Tigers' 77th overall and 35th season as a member of the Southeastern Conference (SEC). The team was led by head coach Ralph "Shug" Jordan, in his 18th year, and played their home games at Cliff Hare Stadium in Auburn and Legion Field in Birmingham, Alabama. They finished with a record of seven wins and four losses (7–4 overall, 4–2 in the SEC) and with a victory over Arizona in the Sun Bowl.

== Schedule ==
Date	Opponent	Rank	Site	TV	Result	Attendance	Source
September 21	SMU*		Cliff Hare Stadium; Auburn, AL		L 28–37	40,606	
September 28	at Mississippi State		Mississippi Veterans Memorial Stadium; Auburn, MS		W 26–0	25,200	
October 5	at Kentucky		McLean Stadium; Lexington KY		W 26–7	35,200	
October 12	at Clemson*		Memorial Stadium; Clemson, SC (rivalry)		W 21–10	38,501	
October 19	Georgia Tech*		Legion Field; Birmingham, AL (rivalry)		L 20–21	47,547	
October 26	No. 9 Miami (FL)*^{†}		Cliff Hare Stadium; Auburn, AL		W 31–6	45,000	
November 2	at No. 20 Florida		Florida Field; Gainesville, FL (rivalry)		W 24–13	63,122	
November 9	No. 5 Tennessee	No. 18	Legion Field; Birmingham, AL		W 28–14	68,821	
November 16	No. 5 Georgia	No. 12	Cliff Hare Stadium; Auburn, AL (rivalry)		L 3–17	51,650	
November 30	vs. No. 15 Alabama	No. 18	Legion Field; Birmingham, AL (Iron Bowl)		L 16–24	68,821–71,534	
December 28	vs. Arizona*		Sun Bowl; El Paso, TX (Sun Bowl)	CBS	W 34–10	32,302	
*Non-conference game; ^{†}Homecoming; Rankings from AP Poll released prior to the game

== Personnel ==
1968 Auburn Tigers football team roster
Players
Coaches
Offense

Pos.	#	Name	Class
C	50	Tom Banks	Jr
QB	11	Dwight Brisendine	Jr
QB	18	Loran Carter	Sr
OT	75	Richard Cheek	Jr
WR	85	Tim Christian	Sr
RB	25	Wallace Clark	So
FB	32	Mac Crawford	So
RB	23	Mike Currier	Jr
FB	30	Larry Ellis	Sr
WR	87	Connie Frederick	Jr
WR		Al Griffin
OL	77	Jerry Gordon
OT	79	Bucky Howard	Sr
RB		Dwight Hurston
OL		Johnny McDonald
TE	81	Bill Moody	So
WR	84	Mike Shows	Jr
QB	10	Tommy Traylor	So
RB	15	Mickey Zofko	So

Defense

Pos.	#	Name	Class
DT	70	David Campbell	Jr
LB	41	Sonny Ferguson	Jr
DE	93	Bill James	Jr
LB	54	Mike Kolen	Jr
DB	27	Buddy McClinton	Jr
DL		Jim Samford
DL		Durwood Sauls
DB		Merrill Shirley
LB		Bobby Strickland
DB	49	Don Webb	Jr
LB	65	Ron Yarborough	Jr

Special teams

Pos.	#	Name	Class

Head coach

- Shug Jordan

Coordinators/assistant coaches

Legend

- (C) Team captain
- (S) Suspended
- (I) Ineligible
- Injured
- Redshirt

Roster
