= Shiri =

Shiri may refer to any of the following:

- Shiri (fish), scientific name Coreoleuciscus splendidus
- Shiri (film), a 1999 South Korean film which takes its name from the fish
- Shiri (race), a fantasy subculture
- Shiri, Khuzestan, a village in Khuzestan Province, Iran
- Shiri, Kohgiluyeh and Boyer-Ahmad, a village in Kohgiluyeh and Boyer-Ahmad Province, Iran
- Shiri Appleby, American actress
- Shiri Artstein, Israeli mathematician
- Shiri Maimon, Israeli singer
- Perrance Shiri, commander of the Air Force of Zimbabwe
- Shiri (honey) A Dagbanli name for honey

== See also ==
- Shir (disambiguation)
- Shira (given name)
