= Sherabad =

Sherabad (Urdu: شيرﺁباد) may refer to:

== Regions ==
- Sherabad (Bhawana), Pakistan
- Sherabad (Sindh), Pakistan

== Others ==
- Sherabad River, Tajikistan

== See also ==
- Sher (disambiguation)
- Shirabad (disambiguation)
