= 1968 Mississippi State Bulldogs football team =

American college football season

1968 Mississippi State Bulldogs football
- Conference: Southeastern Conference
- Record: 0–8–2 (0–4–2 SEC)
- Head coach: Charles Shira (2nd season)
- Home stadium: Scott Field; Mississippi Veterans Memorial Stadium

1968 Southeastern Conference football standings
| | Conf. | | | | | Overall |
| Team | W | | L | | T | W | | L | | T |
|---|---|---|---|---|---|---|---|---|---|---|
| No. 8 Georgia $ | 5 | – | 0 | – | 1 | 8 | – | 1 | – | 2 |
| No. 13 Tennessee | 4 | – | 1 | – | 1 | 8 | – | 2 | – | 1 |
| No. 17 Alabama | 4 | – | 2 | – | 0 | 8 | – | 3 | – | 0 |
| No. 19 LSU | 4 | – | 2 | – | 0 | 8 | – | 3 | – | 0 |
| No. 16 Auburn | 4 | – | 2 | – | 0 | 7 | – | 4 | – | 0 |
| Ole Miss | 3 | – | 2 | – | 1 | 7 | – | 3 | – | 1 |
| Florida | 3 | – | 2 | – | 1 | 6 | – | 3 | – | 1 |
| Vanderbilt | 2 | – | 3 | – | 1 | 5 | – | 4 | – | 1 |
| Mississippi State | 0 | – | 4 | – | 2 | 0 | – | 8 | – | 2 |
| Kentucky | 0 | – | 7 | – | 0 | 3 | – | 7 | – | 0 |
$ – Conference champion; LSU, Florida, and Vanderbilt's games against Tulane; LSU's game against TCU; and Mississippi State's game against Texas Tech counted in the conference standings.; Rankings from AP Poll

The 1968 Mississippi State Bulldogs football team represented Mississippi State University as a member of the Southeastern Conference (SEC) during the 1968 NCAA University Division football season. Led by second-year head coach Charles Shira, the Bulldogs compiled an overall record of 0–8–2 with a mark of 0–4–2 in conference play, placing ninth in the SEC standings. Mississippi State played home games at Scott Field in Starkville, Mississippi and Mississippi Veterans Memorial Stadium and Jackson, Mississippi.

Despite note winning a game, Mississippi State tied two teams that finished with winning records, including rival Ole Miss, led by quarterback Archie Manning.

== Schedule ==
| Date | Opponent | Site | Result | Attendance | Source |
|---|---|---|---|---|---|
| September 21 | Louisiana Tech* | Scott Field; Starkville, MS | L 13–20 | 15,000 | |
| September 28 | Auburn | Mississippi Veterans Memorial Stadium; Jackson, MS | L 0–26 | 25,200 | |
| October 5 | at No. 4 Florida | Florida Field; Gainesville, FL | L 14–31 | 54,921 | |
| October 12 | Southern Miss* | Scott Field; Starkville, MS | L 14–47 | 22,000 | |
| October 19 | No. 15 Texas Tech (Note: Mississippi State's game against Texas Tech counted in the SEC standings.) | Mississippi Veterans Memorial Stadium; Jackson, MS | T 28–28 | 28,000 | |
| October 26 | at Tampa* | Tampa Stadium; Tampa, FL | L 17–24 | 23,340 | |
| November 2 | at Alabama | Denny Stadium; Tuscaloosa, AL (rivalry) | L 13–20 | 58,084 | |
| November 9 | Florida State* | Scott Field; Starkville, MS | L 14–27 | 17,000 | |
| November 16 | at LSU | Tiger Stadium; Baton Rouge, LA (rivalry) | L 16–20 | 57,000 | |
| November 30 | at Ole Miss | Hemingway Stadium; Oxford, MS (Egg Bowl) | T 17–17 | 27,000 | |
*Non-conference game; Rankings from AP Poll released prior to the game

== Roster ==
1968 Mississippi State Bulldogs football team roster
| Players | | | Coaches |
|---|---|---|---|
| Offense: Pos. / # / Name / Class; QB / 19 / Tommy Pharr / Jr | Defense: Pos. / # / Name / Class | Special teams: Pos. / # / Name / Class | Head coach: Charles Shira; Coordinators/assistant coaches Legend: (C) Team captain; (S) Suspended; (I) Ineligible; Injured; Redshirt |
