= 1968 Liberty Bowl =

American college football game

- 10th Liberty Bowl
Ole Miss Rebels	Virginia Tech Gobblers
(6–3–1)	(7–3)
SEC	Independent
34	17
Head coach: Johnny Vaught	Head coach: Jerry Claiborne
	1	2	3	4	Total
Ole Miss	0	14	7	13	34
Virginia Tech	17	0	0	0	17
- Date: December 14, 1968
- Season: 1968
- Stadium: Memphis Memorial Stadium
- Location: Memphis, Tennessee
- MVP: RB Steve Hindman (Ole Miss)
- Referee: Carl Deane (ACC; split crew: ACC, SEC)
- Attendance: 46,206

United States TV coverage
- Network: ABC

The 1968 Liberty Bowl was an American college football postseason bowl game between the Virginia Tech Gobblers (Note: The team's nickname became Hokies in 1981.) and the Ole Miss Rebels. The 10th edition of the Liberty Bowl, it was played at Memphis Memorial Stadium in Memphis, Tennessee, on December 14, 1968. The game was the final contest of the 1968 NCAA University Division football season for both teams, and ended in a 34–17 victory for Mississippi.

Two years after their appearance in the 1966 Liberty Bowl, Virginia Tech was again asked to travel to Memphis for a post-season bowl game. This time, the opponent was Mississippi, who had amassed a 6–3–1 record during the regular season. Virginia Tech came into the game with a 7–3 record that included a loss to their previous Liberty Bowl opponent, the Miami Hurricanes.

As in Virginia Tech's previous appearance in the Liberty Bowl, the team got off to a fast start. On the game's second play, Virginia Tech ran 58 yards for a touchdown, courtesy of a trick play. After Mississippi fumbled, Virginia Tech recovered and scored another quick touchdown. At the end of the first quarter, Virginia Tech added a field goal to the two touchdowns it had already earned, making the score 17–0. From that point onward, however, almost nothing would go in Virginia Tech's favor. They attempted an onside kick following the field goal, but were unable to successfully recover the ball. With good field position following the kick, Mississippi quarterback Archie Manning orchestrated a 49-yard drive for the Rebels' first points of the game.

Mississippi scored another touchdown before halftime, and Virginia Tech clung to a 17–14 lead at the beginning of the second half. That three-point lead quickly evaporated, however, as 21 seconds into the third quarter, Mississippi's Steve Hindman ran for 79 yards and a touchdown to give Mississippi a 21–17 lead. Ole Miss added 13 more points before the game ended and earned the victory, 34–17.

== Teams ==
=== Virginia Tech ===
The Virginia Tech Gobblers (today's Virginia Tech Hokies), led by head coach Jerry Claiborne, amassed a 7–3 record during the regular season prior to the Liberty Bowl. Virginia Tech came into the 1968 season with high expectations. From 1963 to 1967, they were the 12th winningest major college football program, recording 36 wins, 13 losses, and one tie—putting Virginia Tech just behind Notre Dame in winning percentage. During the regular season, linebacker Mike Widger emerged as a major threat on defense. In the team's win over No. 18 Florida State in 1968, Widger intercepted two passes. Shortly after Liberty Bowl committee chairman Bud Dudley selected Virginia Tech to play in the Liberty Bowl, Widger was named a first-team Associated Press All-American, marking him as one of the best players at his position in the country.

=== Mississippi ===
The Ole Miss Rebels, led by head coach Johnny Vaught, earned a regular-season record of 6–3–1 prior to the Liberty Bowl. Vaught remains the all-time leader in wins at Ole Miss, and at the time of Mississippi's selection for the 1968 Liberty Bowl, he had already led the Rebels to three national championships and six Southeastern Conference (SEC) championships, the most recent of each coming in 1962. On the field, Ole Miss featured star quarterback Archie Manning, who despite being just a sophomore, was already making a name for himself and would later go on to set records for passing yardage and passing touchdowns for Ole Miss, en route to becoming one of the greatest quarterbacks in Mississippi history.

== Game summary ==
The 1968 Liberty bowl kicked off on a cold and blustery day in front of 46,206 fans at Memphis Memorial Stadium in Memphis, Tennessee, on December 14, 1968. The record crowd (it was the largest in the 10-year history of the bowl to that point) consumed 20,000 hot dogs—so many that the stadium ran out by the third quarter.

In the first quarter of the game, it appeared that Virginia Tech would run away with an overwhelming victory. Virginia Tech received the ball to begin the game, and on the game's second play, Ken Edwards ran 58 yards on a trick play for the game's first touchdown. Mississippi fumbled the ball on its first offensive play and Virginia Tech recovered the turnover. Three plays later, Virginia Tech scored another touchdown on a seven-yard run by Terry Smoot. After stopping the Rebels with their defense, Virginia Tech appeared to have another chance to score when Ron Davidson returned an Ole Miss punt to the Rebels' 42-yard line. Despite the excellent field position, Virginia Tech was unable to score after quarterback Al Kincaid was sacked for a 19-yard loss. Despite the setback, Virginia Tec wash able to keep Ole Miss from scoring in the first quarter and tacked on a 29-yard field goal by kicker Jack Simcsak before time came to an end in the quarter. At the end of the quarter, Virginia Tech led, 17–0.

In the second quarter, Mississippi came storming back. Following the field goal, Virginia Tech head coach Jerry Claiborne ordered an onside kick in an effort to gain another chance on offense and potentially build an insurmountable lead. Onside kicks, unlike an ordinary free kick, can be recovered by the kicking team—but only after the ball has traveled 10 yards. If the kicking team touches the ball before it has traveled 10 yards, the receiving team takes possession at the place the ball was touched. Unfortunately for Virginia Tech, Simsak's onside kick—though it surprised Ole Miss—did not travel the requisite 10 yards. Mississippi took over at the Virginia Tech 49-yard line, and many of the Ole Miss players were angered by what they considered to be an insult.

Mississippi quarterback Archie Manning used the good field position and his inspired offense proficiently following the kick, driving the Rebels down the field and connecting with Hank Shows on a 21-yard touchdown pass for Mississippi's first points, just 30 seconds into the second quarter. By halftime, Manning had connected on another touchdown pass, this one a 23-yard strike to Leon Felts. Virginia Tech still held a 17–14 lead, but Mississippi had the momentum and would receive the ball to begin the second half.

Ole Miss wasted no time in scoring, as Steve Hindman turned the first play of the second half into a 79-yard run for a touchdown. The Rebels now held a 21–17 lead, and Virginia Tech never threatened afterward. Ole Miss defender Bob Bailey intercepted a pass at the beginning of the fourth quarter and returned it 70 yards for another Mississippi touchdown. The Rebels also added a pair of field goals to their score, and rolled to a 34–17 victory.

== Statistics ==
Statistical comparison
	UM	Virginia Tech
1st downs	7	14
Total yards	326	332
Passing yards	141	2
Rushing yards	185	330
Penalties	4–30	12–120
Turnovers	3	5

Mississippi's Steve Hindman was named the game's most valuable player after he rushed the ball for 121 yards and a touchdown in addition to catching three passes for 32 yards. Ole Miss quarterback Archie Manning finished the game with 141 passing yards and two touchdowns. Virginia Tech was led on offense by Ken Edwards, who finished with 119 rushing yards and a touchdown, and Terry Smoot, who finished with 91 rushing yards and a touchdown. Virginia Tech turned the ball over five times, committing three fumbles and throwing two interceptions. Despite Virginia Tech's relative offensive success on the ground, they were completely inept through the air, completing just one pass for two net passing yards. Both marks remain Liberty Bowl records for the fewest passes and fewest passing yards gained by a team.

Although Virginia Tech had success on defense during the first quarter, Mississippi dominated defensively for the rest of the game. Such was the defensive dominance of Mississippi in the last three quarters of the game that after Virginia Tech's field goal in the first quarter, Virginia Tech had 11 offensive possessions and crossed into Ole Miss territory just once.

In addition to Steve Hindman's selection as the game's MVP, Mississippi had two other players recognized for their achievements in the game: Robert Bailey was named the game's most outstanding defensive back and offensive tackle Worthy McClure was named the game's most outstanding offensive lineman.

== Sources ==
- Lazenby, Roland. Legends: A Pictorial History of Virginia Tech Football. Taylor, Full Court Press (1986) ISBN 978-0-913767-11-5
- Tandler, Rich. Hokie Games: Virginia Tech Football Game by Game 1945–2006. Game by Game Sports Media (September 15, 2007) ISBN 978-0-9723845-2-0
