= 1968 Ole Miss Rebels football team =

American college football season

1968 Ole Miss Rebels football

Liberty Bowl champion

Liberty Bowl, W 34–17 vs. VPI
- Conference: Southeastern Conference
- Record: 7–3–1 (3–2–1 SEC)
- Head coach: Johnny Vaught (22nd season)
- Home stadium: Hemingway Stadium; Mississippi Veterans Memorial Stadium

1968 Southeastern Conference football standings
	Conf.					Overall
Team	W		L		T	W		L		T
No. 8 Georgia $	5	–	0	–	1	8	–	1	–	2
No. 13 Tennessee	4	–	1	–	1	8	–	2	–	1
No. 17 Alabama	4	–	2	–	0	8	–	3	–	0
No. 19 LSU	4	–	2	–	0	8	–	3	–	0
No. 16 Auburn	4	–	2	–	0	7	–	4	–	0
Ole Miss	3	–	2	–	1	7	–	3	–	1
Florida	3	–	2	–	1	6	–	3	–	1
Vanderbilt	2	–	3	–	1	5	–	4	–	1
Mississippi State	0	–	4	–	2	0	–	8	–	2
Kentucky	0	–	7	–	0	3	–	7	–	0
$ – Conference champion; LSU, Florida, and Vanderbilt's games against Tulane; LSU's game against TCU; and Mississippi State's game against Texas Tech counted in the conference standings.; Rankings from AP Poll

The 1968 Ole Miss Rebels football team represented the University of Mississippi during the 1968 NCAA University Division football season. The Rebels were led by 22nd-year head coach Johnny Vaught and played their home games at Hemingway Stadium in Oxford, Mississippi and Mississippi Veterans Memorial Stadium in Jackson. The team competed as members of the Southeastern Conference, finishing tied for sixth. After finishing the regular season with a record of 6–3–1, they were invited to the 1968 Liberty Bowl, where they defeated VPI (Virginia Tech).

== Schedule ==
Date	Opponent	Rank	Site	Result	Attendance	Source
September 21	at Memphis State*		Memphis Memorial Stadium; Memphis, TN (rivalry)	W 21–7	51,046	
September 27	Kentucky		Mississippi Veterans Memorial Stadium; Jackson, MS	W 30–14	40,102	
October 4	No. 11 Alabama		Mississippi Veterans Memorial Stadium; Jackson, MS (rivalry)	W 10–8	47,152	
October 11	at No. 17 Georgia	No. 13	Sanford Stadium; Athens, GA	L 7–21	56,111	
October 18	Southern Miss*	No. 16	Hemingway Stadium; Oxford, MS	W 21–13	28,000	
October 25	Houston*	No. 17	Mississippi Veterans Memorial Stadium; Jackson, MS	L 7–29	32,157	
November 1	at No. 14 LSU		Tiger Stadium; Baton Rouge, LA (rivalry)	W 27–24	69,337	
November 8	No. 3 (small) Chattanooga*		Hemingway Stadium; Oxford, MS	W 38–16	15,000	
November 15	at No. 11 Tennessee		Neyland Stadium; Knoxville, TN (rivalry)	L 0–31	62,786	
November 29	Mississippi State		Hemingway Stadium; Oxford, MS (Egg Bowl)	T 17–17	27,000	
December 13	vs. Virginia Tech*		Memphis Memorial Stadium; Memphis, TN (Liberty Bowl)	W 34–17	46,206	
*Non-conference game; Rankings from AP Poll released prior to the game

== Roster ==
1968 Ole Miss Rebels football team roster
Players
Coaches
Offense

Pos.	#	Name	Class
QB	18	Archie Manning	So
WR	81	Vernon Studdard	So

Defense

Pos.	#	Name	Class

Special teams

Pos.	#	Name	Class

Head coach

- Johnny Vaught

Coordinators/assistant coaches

Legend

- (C) Team captain
- (S) Suspended
- (I) Ineligible
- Injured
- Redshirt
