= 1968 LSU Tigers football team =

American college football season

1968 LSU Tigers football

Peach Bowl champion

Peach Bowl, W 31–27 vs. Florida State
- Conference: Southeastern Conference

Ranking
- AP: No. 19
- Record: 8–3 (4–2 SEC)
- Head coach: Charles McClendon (7th season)
- Home stadium: Tiger Stadium

1968 Southeastern Conference football standings
	Conf.					Overall
Team	W		L		T	W		L		T
No. 8 Georgia $	5	–	0	–	1	8	–	1	–	2
No. 13 Tennessee	4	–	1	–	1	8	–	2	–	1
No. 17 Alabama	4	–	2	–	0	8	–	3	–	0
No. 19 LSU	4	–	2	–	0	8	–	3	–	0
No. 16 Auburn	4	–	2	–	0	7	–	4	–	0
Ole Miss	3	–	2	–	1	7	–	3	–	1
Florida	3	–	2	–	1	6	–	3	–	1
Vanderbilt	2	–	3	–	1	5	–	4	–	1
Mississippi State	0	–	4	–	2	0	–	8	–	2
Kentucky	0	–	7	–	0	3	–	7	–	0
$ – Conference champion; LSU, Florida, and Vanderbilt's games against Tulane; LSU's game against TCU; and Mississippi State's game against Texas Tech counted in the conference standings.; Rankings from AP Poll

The 1968 LSU Tigers football team represented Louisiana State University (LSU) as a member of the Southeastern Conference (SEC) during the 1968 NCAA University Division football season. Led by seventh-year head coach Charles McClendon, The Tigers compiled an overall record of 8–3 with a mark of 4–2 in conference play, placing in a three-way tie for third in the SEC. LSU was invited to the inaugural Peach Bowl, where the Tigers defeated Florida State, 31–27. The offense scored 221 points while the defense allowed 171 points in the season. The team played home games at Tiger Stadium in Baton Rouge, Louisiana.

== Schedule ==
The games against TCU and Tulane were designated as conference games by the SEC, since LSU had only four conference opponents on its schedule. Under SEC rules at the time, teams had to play a minimum of six conference games to be eligible for the championship. This rule was repealed in 1969, but reinstated in 1972.

Date	Opponent	Rank	Site	Result	Attendance	Source
September 21	No. 13 Texas A&M*	No. 20	Tiger Stadium; Baton Rouge, LA (rivalry)	W 13–12	68,000	
September 28	at Rice*	No. 14	Rice Stadium; Houston, TX	W 21–7	59,000	
October 5	Baylor*	No. 10	Tiger Stadium; Baton Rouge, LA	W 48–16	67,931	
October 11	at Miami (FL)*	No. 8	Miami Orange Bowl; Miami, FL	L 0–30	39,284	
October 19	Kentucky	No. 20	Tiger Stadium; Baton Rouge, LA	W 13–3	66,147	
October 26	TCU^{†}	No. 18	Tiger Stadium; Baton Rouge, LA	W 10–7	65,638	
November 2	Ole Miss	No. 14	Tiger Stadium; Baton Rouge, LA (rivalry)	L 24–27	69,337	
November 9	at Alabama	No. 20	Legion Field; Birmingham, AL (rivalry)	L 7–16	67,292	
November 16	Mississippi State		Tiger Stadium; Baton Rouge, LA (rivalry)	W 20–16	57,000	
November 23	at Tulane		Tulane Stadium; New Orleans, LA (Battle for the Rag)	W 34–10	55,000	
December 30	vs. Florida State*		Grant Field; Atlanta, GA (Peach Bowl)	W 31–27	35,545	
*Non-conference game; ^{†}Homecoming; Rankings from AP Poll released prior to the game

== Roster ==
1968 LSU Tigers football team roster
Players
Coaches
Offense

Pos.	#	Name	Class
QB	18	Buddy Lee	So
HB	33	Eddie Ray	Jr
C	51	Godfrey Zaunbrecher	Jr

Defense

Pos.	#	Name	Class
LB	45	Mike Anderson	So
DT	73	John Sage	So

Special teams

Pos.	#	Name	Class
K	25	Mark Lumpkin	So

Head coach

- Charles McClendon

Coordinators/assistant coaches

Legend

- (C) Team captain
- (S) Suspended
- (I) Ineligible
- Injured
- Redshirt

Roster

== Team players drafted into the NFL ==
Player	Position	Round	Pick	NFL team
Ken Newfield	Running back	6	136	Oakland Raiders
Bill Fortier	Tackle	6	154	Baltimore Colts
Maurice LeBlanc	Defensive back	8	206	Kansas City Chiefs
Tommy Morel	Flanker	11	267	New Orleans Saints
