= 1968 Vanderbilt Commodores football team =

American college football season

1968 Vanderbilt Commodores football
- Conference: Southeastern Conference
- Record: 5–4–1 (2–3–1 SEC)
- Head coach: Bill Pace (2nd season)
- Home stadium: Dudley Field

1968 Southeastern Conference football standings
	Conf.					Overall
Team	W		L		T	W		L		T
No. 8 Georgia $	5	–	0	–	1	8	–	1	–	2
No. 13 Tennessee	4	–	1	–	1	8	–	2	–	1
No. 17 Alabama	4	–	2	–	0	8	–	3	–	0
No. 19 LSU	4	–	2	–	0	8	–	3	–	0
No. 16 Auburn	4	–	2	–	0	7	–	4	–	0
Ole Miss	3	–	2	–	1	7	–	3	–	1
Florida	3	–	2	–	1	6	–	3	–	1
Vanderbilt	2	–	3	–	1	5	–	4	–	1
Mississippi State	0	–	4	–	2	0	–	8	–	2
Kentucky	0	–	7	–	0	3	–	7	–	0
$ – Conference champion; LSU, Florida, and Vanderbilt's games against Tulane; LSU's game against TCU; and Mississippi State's game against Texas Tech counted in the conference standings.; Rankings from AP Poll

The 1968 Vanderbilt Commodores football team represented Vanderbilt University as a member of the Southeastern Conference (SEC) during the 1968 NCAA University Division football season. Led by second-year head coach Bill Pace, the Commodores compiled an overall record of 5–4–1 with a mark of 2–3–1 in conference play, placing eighth in the SEC standings. Vanderbilt played home games at Dudley Field in Nashville, Tennessee.

== Schedule ==
Date	Time	Opponent	Site	Result	Attendance	Source
September 21		VMI*	Dudley Field; Nashville, TN	W 25–12	17,000	
September 28	1:00 p.m.	at Army*	Michie Stadium; West Point, NY	W 17–13	23,000	
October 5		North Carolina*	Dudley Field; Nashville, TN	L 7–8	20,480	
October 12		at Alabama	Denny Stadium; Tuscaloosa, AL	L 7–31	45,357	
October 19		at No. 10 Georgia	Sanford Stadium; Athens, GA (rivalry)	L 6–32	54,342	
October 26		No. 15 Florida	Dudley Field; Nashville, TN	T 14–14	15,500	
November 2		Tulane (Note: Vanderbilt's game against Tulane counted in the SEC standings.)	Dudley Field; Nashville, TN	W 21–7	16,469	
November 9		at Kentucky	McLean Stadium; Lexington, KY (rivalry)	W 6–0	29,000	
November 23		at Davidson*	American Legion Memorial Stadium; Charlotte, NC	W 53–20	4,000	
November 30		No. 7 Tennessee	Dudley Field; Nashville, TN (rivalry)	L 7–10	34,000	
*Non-conference game; Rankings from AP Poll released prior to the game; All times are in Central time
