= Shira (given name) =

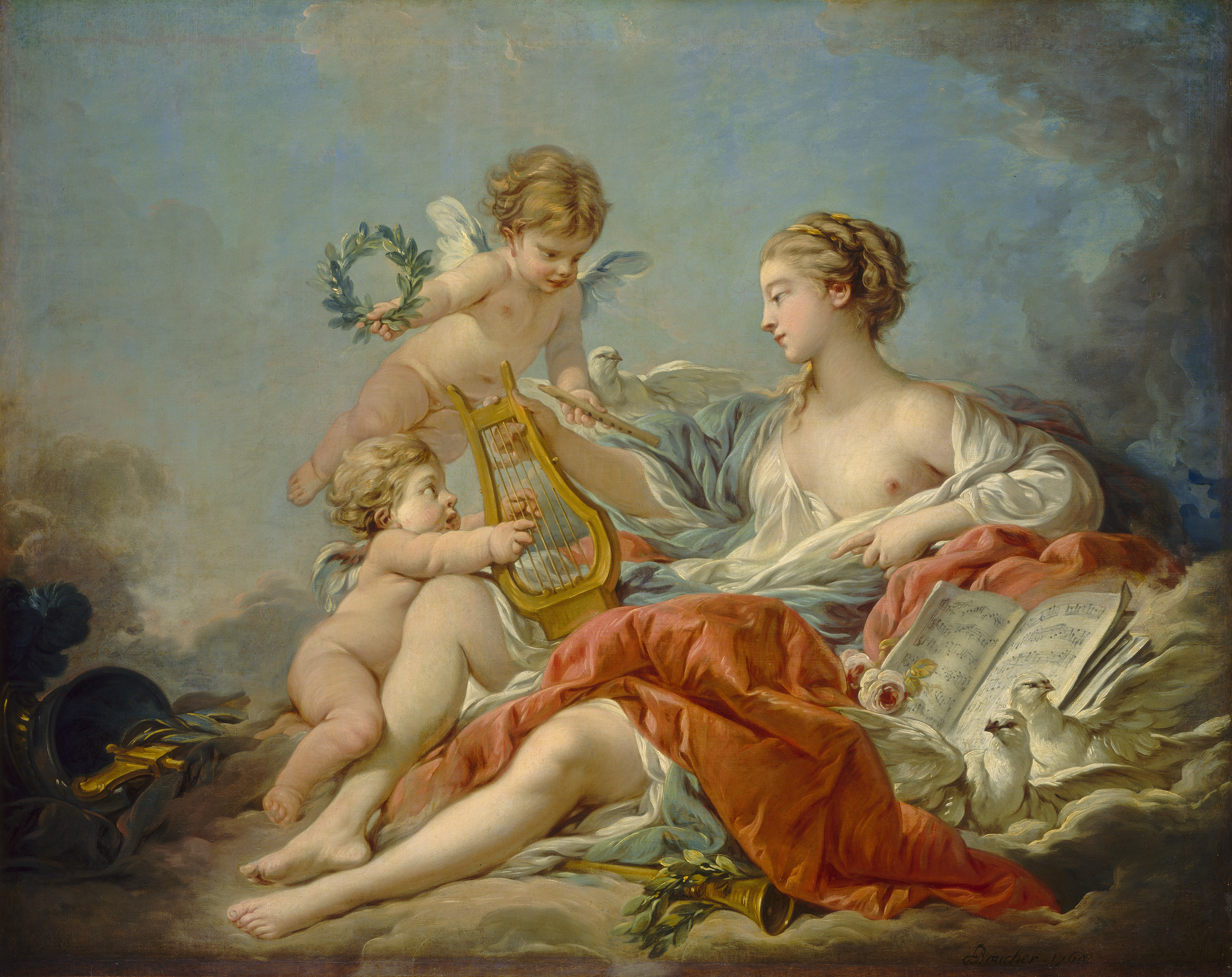
- Allegory of Music (1764), painted by François Boucher
- Gender: Female

Origin
- Word/name: Hebrew

Shira (Hebrew: שירה) is a Hebrew feminine given name meaning "poetry", "singing" or "music". It was the second most popular name given to girls born in Israel in 2012.

- Shira Arad
- Shira Geffen
- Shira Haas, Israeli actress
- Shira Kammen
- Shira Lazar
- Shira Naor, American-born Israeli actress
- Shira Nayman
- Shira Perlmutter
- Shira Piven
- Shira Rishony (born 1991), Israeli Olympic judoka
- Shira Scheindlin
- Shira Tarrant
- Shira Willner, German figure skater

== See also ==
- Shir (disambiguation)
- Shiri (disambiguation)
