= 1968 Alabama Crimson Tide football team =

American college football season

1968 Alabama Crimson Tide football

Gator Bowl, L 10–35 vs. Missouri
- Conference: Southeastern Conference

Ranking
- Coaches: No. 17
- AP: No. 12
- Record: 8–3 (4–2 SEC)
- Head coach: Bear Bryant (11th season)
- Captains: Mike Hall; Donnie Sutton
- Home stadium: Denny Stadium; Legion Field; Ladd Stadium

1968 Southeastern Conference football standings
	Conf.					Overall
Team	W		L		T	W		L		T
No. 8 Georgia $	5	–	0	–	1	8	–	1	–	2
No. 13 Tennessee	4	–	1	–	1	8	–	2	–	1
No. 17 Alabama	4	–	2	–	0	8	–	3	–	0
No. 19 LSU	4	–	2	–	0	8	–	3	–	0
No. 16 Auburn	4	–	2	–	0	7	–	4	–	0
Ole Miss	3	–	2	–	1	7	–	3	–	1
Florida	3	–	2	–	1	6	–	3	–	1
Vanderbilt	2	–	3	–	1	5	–	4	–	1
Mississippi State	0	–	4	–	2	0	–	8	–	2
Kentucky	0	–	7	–	0	3	–	7	–	0
$ – Conference champion; LSU, Florida, and Vanderbilt's games against Tulane; LSU's game against TCU; and Mississippi State's game against Texas Tech counted in the conference standings.; Rankings from AP Poll

The 1968 Alabama Crimson Tide football team (variously "Alabama", "UA" or "Bama") represented the University of Alabama in the 1968 NCAA University Division football season. It was the Crimson Tide's 74th overall and 35th season as a member of the Southeastern Conference (SEC). The team was led by head coach Bear Bryant, in his 11th year, and played their home games at Denny Stadium in Tuscaloosa, Legion Field in Birmingham and Ladd Stadium in Mobile, Alabama. They finished season with eight wins and three losses (8–3 overall, 4–2 in the SEC) and with a loss against Missouri in the Gator Bowl.

Alabama opened the season ranked #7 and won their first two games against Virginia Tech at Birmingham and Southern Miss in their annual Mobile game, which proved to be the last game Alabama would play at Ladd Stadium in Mobile. In their third game, the Crimson Tide were upset by Ole Miss at Jackson, their first loss to the Rebels since the 1910 season. They rebounded the next week with a victory over Vanderbilt but lost the next week to Tennessee after coach Bryant elected to go for the victory instead of a tie and missed a two-point conversion and lost 10–9 at Knoxville.

After their loss to Tennessee, Alabama rebounded and won their final five regular season games. After they defeated Clemson, they returned to Tuscaloosa where they defeated Mississippi State on homecoming. The Crimson Tide next upset LSU in Birmingham, defeated Miami at the Miami Orange Bowl, and Auburn in the Iron Bowl. Later that December, Alabama lost 35–10 to Missouri in the Gator Bowl.

== Schedule ==
Date	Opponent	Rank	Site	TV	Result	Attendance
September 21	Virginia Tech*	No. 7	Legion Field; Birmingham, AL		W 14–7	63,759
September 28	Southern Miss*	No. 7	Ladd Stadium; Mobile, AL		W 17–14	38,051
October 5	at Ole Miss	No. 11	Mississippi Veterans Memorial Stadium; Jackson, MS (rivalry)		L 8–10	47,152
October 12	Vanderbilt		Denny Stadium; Tuscaloosa, AL		W 31–7	45,357
October 19	at No. 8 Tennessee		Neyland Stadium; Knoxville, TN (Third Saturday in October)	ABC	L 9–10	63,392
October 26	Clemson*		Denny Stadium; Tuscaloosa, AL (rivalry)		W 21–14	43,874
November 2	Mississippi State^{†}		Denny Stadium; Tuscaloosa, AL (rivalry)		W 20–13	58,084
November 9	No. 20 LSU		Legion Field; Birmingham, AL (rivalry)		W 16–7	67,292
November 16	at Miami (FL)*	No. 16	Miami Orange Bowl; Miami, FL	ABC	W 14–6	43,418
November 30	vs. No. 18 Auburn	No. 15	Legion Field; Birmingham, AL (Iron Bowl)		W 24–16	71,534
December 28	vs. No. 16 Missouri*	No. 12	Gator Bowl Stadium; Jacksonville, FL (Gator Bowl)	ABC	L 10–35	68,011
*Non-conference game; ^{†}Homecoming; Rankings from AP Poll released prior to the game

== Game summaries ==
=== Virginia Tech ===
Team	1	2	3	4	Total
Virginia Tech	0	7	0	0	7
• #7 Alabama	0	14	0	0	14

- Date: September 21
- Location: Legion Field
  Birmingham, Alabama
- Game attendance: 63,759

To open the 1968 season, Alabama defeated the Virginia Tech Hokies 14–7 at Legion Field. After a scoreless first quarter, all three of the touchdowns scored in the game were made in the second quarter. Alabama took a 14–0 lead on a pair of Scott Hunter to George Ranager touchdown passes first from eight and then from 65-yards. The Hokies then scored their only points with 0:42 left in the half after Larry Creekmore blocked a Frank Mann punt that was recovered by Jud Brownell in the endzone for a touchdown. In the game, the Alabama defense was dominant and only allowed Tech 51 total yards of offense that included minus 17 rushing yards in the victory.

=== Southern Miss ===
Team	1	2	3	4	Total
Southern Miss	0	7	7	0	14
• #7 Alabama	7	0	0	10	17

- Date: September 28
- Location: Ladd Stadium
  Mobile, Alabama
- Game attendance: 38,051

After their victory over Virginia Tech, Alabama retained their No. 7 position in the AP Poll prior to their game against Southern Miss. In their annual game played at Mobile, Alabama came from behind and defeated the Southerners 17–10 behind a ten-point rally in the fourth quarter. The Crimson Tide took an early 7–0 lead after Ed Morgan scored on a nine-yard touchdown run. The Golden Eagles responded in the second with a one-yard Tommy Boutwell touchdown pass to Toby Vance that tied the game 7–7 at halftime. Larry Moulton next scored on a two-yard run that gave Southern a 14–7 lead in the third quarter.

Early in the fourth after Donnie Sutton recovered an Eagles fumble, Oran Buck cut the lead to 14–10 with his 19-yard field goal. Alabama then scored the game-winning points late in the game on a 34-yard Scott Hunter touchdown pass to George Ranager for the 17–10 victory.

=== Ole Miss ===
Team	1	2	3	4	Total
#11 Alabama	0	0	0	8	8
• Ole Miss	0	7	3	0	10

- Date: October 5
- Location: Memorial Stadium
  Jackson, Mississippi
- Game attendance: 47,152

After their near loss against Southern Miss, Alabama dropped from the No. 7 to No. 11 position in the AP Poll prior to their game at Ole Miss. Against the Rebels, the Crimson Tide was upset 10–8 before the largest crowd to date ever to witness a college football game in the state of Mississippi. After a scoreless first, Ole Miss took a 7–0 halftime lead after Archie Manning threw a six-yard touchdown pass to Henry Shows in the second quarter. They then extended their lead to 10–0 with a 44-yard Perry King field goal in the third quarter.

Alabama ended the Ole Miss shutout bid with just 0:08 left in the game after a Julian Fagan punt was blocked by Mike Hall and recovered by Mike Reilly in the endzone for a touchdown. They then converted a two-point conversion that made the final score 10–8. The victory was the first for Ole Miss over Alabama since their 16–0 win in 1910, a period that spanned 58 years.

=== Vanderbilt ===
Team	1	2	3	4	Total
Vanderbilt	0	0	0	7	7
• Alabama	7	0	10	14	31

- Date: October 12
- Location: Denny Stadium
  Tuscaloosa, Alabama
- Game attendance: 45,357

After their loss against Ole Miss, Alabama dropped out of the AP Poll altogether prior to their game against Vanderbilt. Against the Commodores, Alabama rebounded from the previous weeks loss with a 31–7 victory at Tuscaloosa. Ed Morgan scored the first points of the game with his one-yard touchdown run in the first quarter for a 7–0 lead. After a scoreless second quarter, the Crimson Tide extended their lead to 17–0 in the third on a 21-yard Mike Dean field goal and a 17-yard Buddy Seay touchdown run.

In the fourth, Scott Hunter scored for Alabama on a one-yard run, followed with Vanderbilt's only points on a four-yard David Strong run and then the Crimson Tide made the final score 31–7 on a one-yard Pete Moore touchdown run.

=== Tennessee ===
Third Saturday in October

Team	1	2	3	4	Total
Alabama	3	0	0	6	9
• #8 Tennessee	7	0	0	3	10

- Date: October 19
- Location: Neyland Stadium
  Knoxville, Tennessee
- Game attendance: 63,392

Against Tennessee, coach Bryant elected to go for the victory instead of a tie in the final minutes of the game, and after the failed two-point conversion the Volunteers held onto a 10–9 victory at Knoxville. Tennessee took an early 7–0 lead in the first quarter after Richmond Flowers scored on a one-yard touchdown run. Alabama responded later in the quarter with a 28-yard Mike Dean field goal that made the score 7–3. The score remained the same through the fourth quarter when Karl Kremser kicked what was then a SEC record 54-yard field goal that extended the Volunteers lead to 10–3.

After the Tennessee field goal, the Crimson Tide had their most sustained drive of the game. The 80-yard drive culminated in a four-yard Donnie Sutton touchdown reception from Scott Hunter that made the score 10–9. However, instead of playing for the tie and kicking the extra point, coach Bryant elected to go for the win on a two-point conversion. On the attempt, Joe Kelley failed to complete the pass to Sutton and Tennessee won the game as a result 10–9.

=== Clemson ===
Team	1	2	3	4	Total
Clemson	0	7	7	0	14
• Alabama	14	0	0	7	21

- Date: October 26
- Location: Denny Stadium
  Tuscaloosa, Alabama
- Game attendance: 43,874

At Denny Stadium, the Crimson Tide narrowly defeated the Tigers of the Atlantic Coast Conference 21–14. Alabama took an early 14–0 lead with a pair of first-quarter touchdowns. The first came on a 40-yard Donnie Sutton reception from Scott Hunter and the second on a 13-yard Buddy Seay run. Clemson responded and tied the game 14–14 with touchdowns in each of the next two quarters. Buddy Gore scored first in the second quarter on a three-yard run and was followed with a six-yard Billy Ammons touchdown pass to Ray Yauger in the third.

Alabama retook the lead in the fourth on a 30-yard Hunter touchdown pass to George Ranager that made the score 21–14. Clemson then drove the ball late to the Crimson Tide 41-yard line only to have Ammons throw an interception late that sealed the Alabama victory.

=== Mississippi State ===
Team	1	2	3	4	Total
Mississippi State	6	0	7	0	13
• Alabama	7	13	0	0	20

- Date: November 2
- Location: Denny Stadium
  Tuscaloosa, Alabama
- Game attendance: 58,084

On homecoming in Tuscaloosa, the Crimson Tide held leading SEC quarterback Tommy Pharr in check and defeated the Mississippi State Bulldogs 20–13 at Tuscaloosa. After Alabama took an early 7–0 lead on a two-yard Ed Morgan touchdown run, the Bulldogs responded with a one-yard Lynn Zeringue touchdown run, but a failed extra point kept the Crimson Tide in the lead 7–6. Alabama then extended their lead to 20–6 at halftime with 13 second quarter points. After Pete Jilleba scored on a two-yard touchdown run, Mike Dean connected on field goals of 25 and 29-yards.

The final points of the game came in the third quarter when Pharr threw an eight-yard touchdown pass to Sammy Milner that made the final score 20–13. In the game, Pete Moore led the Crimson Tide after he rushed for 115 yards on 28 carries.

=== LSU ===
Team	1	2	3	4	Total
#20 LSU	0	0	7	0	7
• Alabama	6	0	3	7	16

- Date: November 9
- Location: Legion Field
  Birmingham, Alabama
- Game attendance: 68,500

On a cool afternoon before a capacity crowd at Legion Field, Alabama upset the LSU Tigers 16–7. The Crimson Tide took their opening possession 79-yards in eight plays that culminated with an 11-yard Scott Hunter touchdown pass to Pete Jilleba for a 6–0 lead. After a scoreless second, LSU took a 7–6 lead in the third quarter on a 15-yard Kenny Newfield touchdown run. Alabama responded with ten unanswered points to close the game and won 16–7. After a 29-yard Mike Dean field goal in the third, Hunter threw a 16-yard touchdown pass to Donnie Sutton in the fourth quarter.

=== Miami (FL) ===
Team	1	2	3	4	Total
• #16 Alabama	7	0	0	7	14
Miami	0	0	0	6	6

- Date: November 16
- Location: Orange Bowl Stadium
  Miami, Florida
- Game attendance: 43,418
- TV announcers (ABC): Chris Schenkel (play-by-play), Bud Wilkinson (color)

After their victory over LSU, Alabama reentered the AP Poll at the No. 16 position prior to their game at Miami. On homecoming at the Orange Bowl, Alabama defeated the Hurricanes 14–6 behind a long touchdown reception and interception return. This game was also noted for being the first college football regular season game to be telecast nationally on prime time television.

The Crimson Tide took a 7–0 lead in the first quarter when Scott Hunter threw a 73-yard touchdown pass to Donnie Sutton. Alabama remained up by a touchdown through the fourth quarter when Mike Dean intercepted a Lew Pytel pass and returned it 69-yards for a touchdown and a 14–0 lead. The Hurricanes responded late with a two-yard Bobby Best touchdown run that made the final score 14–6.

=== Auburn ===
Iron Bowl

Team	1	2	3	4	Total
#18 Auburn	3	0	7	6	16
• #15 Alabama	7	7	7	3	24

- Date: November 30
- Location: Legion Field
  Birmingham, Alabama
- Game attendance: 71,534

After their victory over Miami, Alabama moved into the No. 15 position in the AP Poll prior to their game against Auburn. Behind a strong all-around performance in the annual Iron Bowl game, Alabama defeated the Tigers 24–16 at Legion Field in the final game of the regular season. After Ed Morgan gave Alabama a 7–0 lead with his 35-yard touchdown run, Auburn responded with a 22-yard John Riley field goal that made the score 7–3 at the end of the first quarter. The Crimson Tide then took a 14–3 halftime lead after Morgan scored his second touchdown of the game on a one-yard run.

After Alabama went up 21–3 on a five-yard Scott Hunter touchdown pass to Mike Hall in the third quarter, Auburn responded with their first touchdown of the game on a 70-yard Loran Carter pass to Mike Currier that made the score 21–10. After the Tigers scored their second touchdown on a five-yard Carter pass to Connie Frederick, Alabama scored their final points of the game on a 30-yard Mike Dean field goal that made the final score 24–16.

=== Missouri ===
Gator Bowl

Team	1	2	3	4	Total
• #16 Missouri	7	7	0	21	35
#12 Alabama	0	7	0	3	10

- Date: December 28
- Location: Gator Bowl Stadium
  Jacksonville, Florida
- Game attendance: 68,011

On November 20, Alabama accepted an invitation to play Missouri of the Big Eight Conference in the Gator Bowl for their 10th consecutive bowl game appearance. Against the Tigers, Bryant suffered his worst loss to date as head coach of the Crimson Tide with this 35–10 loss in the first all-time meeting between the schools. After Terry McMillan gave Missouri a 7–0 lead with his four-yard touchdown run in the first, Alabama responded in the second with their only touchdown of the game on a 38-yard Donnie Sutton interception return. McMillan then responded with his second touchdown of the game of the game on a five-yard run that made the halftime score 14–7. The score remained the same through the fourth quarter when Alabama converted a 28-yard Mike Dean field goal before the Tigers closed the game with three unanswered touchdowns and won 35–10. These touchdowns were scored on a two-yard McMillan run, a 35-yard Greg Cook run and on a 47-yard Dennis Poppe interception return.

== NFL draft ==
Several players that were varsity lettermen from the 1968 squad were drafted into the National Football League (NFL) in the 1969 and 1971 drafts. These players included the following:

Year	Round	Overall	Player name	Position	NFL team
1969 NFL/AFL draft	10	260	Mike Hall	Linebacker	New York Jets
1969 NFL/AFL draft	16	413	William Davis	Linebacker	Oakland Raiders
1971 NFL draft	6	140	Scott Hunter	Quarterback	Green Bay Packers

== Freshman squad ==
Prior to the 1972 NCAA University Division football season, NCAA rules prohibited freshmen from participating on the varsity team, and as such many schools fielded freshmen teams. The Alabama freshmen squad was led by coach Clem Gryska for the 1968 season and finished with a record of two wins and three losses (2–3). The Baby Tide opened their season with a 20–16 come-from-behind victory over Mississippi State at Denny Stadium. Chuck Jordan gave State a 3–0 lead with his 31-yard field goal, and Alabama responded with a one-yard Johnny Musso touchdown run that made the score 7–3. In the second quarter, the Bullpups scored on a pair of Steve Natale that made the halftime score 16–7. The first was from eight-yards to Jerry Harris and the second from nine-yards to John Male. After a scoreless third, Alabama won the game 20–16 after fourth-quarter touchdowns on a 55-yard Bubba Sawyer punt return and on a one-yard Musso run.

In their second game Vanderbilt took a 24–0 lead into the fourth quarter and Alabama went on to lose 24–14 at Nashville. Commodores touchdowns were scored by Dwight Blair on a two-yard run, a seven-yard Watson Brown pass to Gary Chesley and on a three-yard Brown run. Alabama scored their touchdowns in the fourth on a 49-yard Al Harvey interception return and on a 38-yard Bubba Sawyer touchdown reception. In their third game, the Baby Tide lost their second road game of the season at Ole Miss 15–13. Against the Rebels, Buddy Talley threw for both of Alabama's touchdowns. The first was from six-yards to David Bailey and the second from 16-yards to Robin Parkhouse, but a failed two-point conversion kept Alabama from tying the game.

Although Tennessee gained 419 yards of total offense in the game, Alabama defeated the Vols 28–21 at Denny Stadium. In the game, Johnny Musso starred for Alabama with a pair of touchdown runs from three and nine-yards as well as a touchdown reception on a 16-yard Terry Davis pass. In their final game of the season against Auburn, Alabama led 27–0 at halftime; however, Pat Sullivan led the Tigers to 36 unanswered points in the second half for a 36–27 Auburn victory at Tuscaloosa. Alabama's touchdowns were scored by Hal Dunbar on runs of five and eight-yards, a three-yard Dunbar pass to Steve Williams and on a 24-yard Tommy Stringfellow run. In the second half, Sullivan threw touchdown passes of 33-yards to Daryl Johnson, 36 and 72-yards to Terry Beasley and four-yards to Jere Colley. The Tigers final touchdown was scored by David Shelby on a one-yard run that made the final score 36–27.

== Personnel ==
=== Varsity letter winners ===
Player	Hometown	Position
Randy Barron	Dadeville, Alabama	Defensive tackle
Bill Blair	Nashville, Tennessee	Defensive back
Paul Boschung	Tuscaloosa, Alabama	Defensive tackle
Randy Brown	Scottsville, New York	Tackle
Phil Chaffin	Huntsville, Alabama	Fullback
Bob Childs	Montgomery, Alabama	Linebacker
Roger Crowson	Jackson, Mississippi	Fullback
William Davis	Birmingham, Alabama	Tackle
Mike Dean	Decatur, Georgia	Defensive back
Dennis Dixon	Orange, California	Tight end
Reid Drinkard	Linden, Alabama	Offensive guard
Jim Duke	Columbus, Georgia	Defensive tackle
Charles Ferguson	Cuthbert, Georgia	Offensive guard
Danny Ford	Gadsden, Alabama	Offensive tackle
Mike Ford	Tuscaloosa, Alabama	Defensive end
Conrad Fowler	Columbiana, Alabama	Split end
Sam Gellerstedt	Montgomery, Alabama	Nose guard
Danny Gilbert	Geraldine, Alabama	Defensive back
Richard Grammer	Hartselle, Alabama	Center
Mike Hall	Tarrant, Alabama	Linebacker
Norris Hamer	Tarrant, Alabama	Defensive end
Mike Hand	Tuscumbia, Alabama	Linebacker
Don Harris	Vincent, Alabama	Defensive tackle
Robert Higginbotham	Hueytown, Alabama	Defensive back
Scott Hunter	Prichard, Alabama	Quarterback
Hunter Husband	Nashville, Tennessee	Tight end
Pete Jilleba	Madison, New Jersey	Fullback
Joe Kelley	Ozark, Alabama	Quarterback
Griff Langston	Birmingham, Alabama	Split end
Mickey Lee	Enterprise, Alabama	Fullback
Frank Mann	Birmingham, Alabama	Placekicker
Jack McKewen	Birmingham, Alabama	Tackle
Pete Moore	Hopkinsville, Kentucky	Fullback
Ed Morgan	Hattiesburg, Mississippi	Fullback
Wayne Owen	Gadsden, Alabama	Linebacker
George Ranager	Meridian, Mississippi	Split end
Mike Reilly	Mobile, Alabama	Guard
Ronnie Roddam	Birmingham, Alabama	Center
Alvin Samples	Tarrant, Alabama	Offensive guard
Billy Scroggins	Jacksonville, Florida	Split end
Donnie Sutton	Blountsville, Alabama	Split end
Bobby Swafford	Heflin, Alabama	Split end
Tommy Wade	Dothan, Alabama	Defensive back
Tommy Weigand	Enterprise, Alabama	Halfback
Ken Wilder	Columbiana, Alabama	Offensive tackle

=== Coaching staff ===
Name	Position	Seasons at Alabama	Alma mater
Bear Bryant	Head coach	11	Alabama (1936)
Sam Bailey	Assistant coach	11	Ouachita Baptist (1949)
Ken Donahue	Assistant coach	5	Tennessee (1951)
Pat Dye	Assistant coach	4	Georgia (1962)
Jim Goostree	Assistant coach	12	Tennessee (1952)
Clem Gryska	Assistant coach	9	Alabama (1948)
Dude Hennessey	Assistant coach	9	Kentucky (1955)
Carney Laslie	Assistant coach	12	Alabama (1934)
Mal Moore	Assistant coach	5	Alabama (1962)
Dee Powell	Assistant coach	6	Texas A&M (1957)
Hayden Riley	Assistant coach	11	Alabama (1948)
Tom Rogers	Assistant coach	3	Delta State (1956)
Jack Rutledge	Assistant coach	3	Alabama (1962)
Jimmy Sharpe	Assistant coach	6	Alabama (1962)
Steve Sloan	Assistant coach	1	Alabama (1966)
Tommy Tolleson	Assistant coach	1	Alabama (1966)
Richard Williamson	Assistant coach	5	Alabama (1963)
