= 1968 Florida Gators football team =

American college football season

1968 Florida Gators football
- Conference: Southeastern Conference
- Record: 6–3–1 (3–2–1 SEC)
- Head coach: Ray Graves (9th season)
- Offensive coordinator: Ed Kensler (4th season)
- Defensive coordinator: Gene Ellenson (5th season)
- Home stadium: Florida Field

1968 Southeastern Conference football standings
	Conf.					Overall
Team	W		L		T	W		L		T
No. 8 Georgia $	5	–	0	–	1	8	–	1	–	2
No. 13 Tennessee	4	–	1	–	1	8	–	2	–	1
No. 17 Alabama	4	–	2	–	0	8	–	3	–	0
No. 19 LSU	4	–	2	–	0	8	–	3	–	0
No. 16 Auburn	4	–	2	–	0	7	–	4	–	0
Ole Miss	3	–	2	–	1	7	–	3	–	1
Florida	3	–	2	–	1	6	–	3	–	1
Vanderbilt	2	–	3	–	1	5	–	4	–	1
Mississippi State	0	–	4	–	2	0	–	8	–	2
Kentucky	0	–	7	–	0	3	–	7	–	0
$ – Conference champion; LSU, Florida, and Vanderbilt's games against Tulane; LSU's game against TCU; and Mississippi State's game against Texas Tech counted in the conference standings.; Rankings from AP Poll

The 1968 Florida Gators football team represented the University of Florida during the 1968 NCAA University Division football season. The season was Ray Graves' ninth of ten years as the head coach of the Florida Gators football team. The Gators offense was led by senior tailback Larry Smith, a first-team All-American. Among the season's highlights were the Gators' conference wins over the Mississippi State Bulldogs (31–14), Tulane Green Wave (24–7) and Kentucky Wildcats (16–14), and victories over the in-state rival Florida State Seminoles (9–3) and Miami Hurricanes (14–10). The Gators also suffered their worst loss since 1942—a 51–0 blowout by the Georgia Bulldogs. Graves' 1968 Florida Gators finished 6–3–1 overall and 3–2–1 in the Southeastern Conference (SEC), tying for sixth among the ten teams of the SEC.

== Schedule ==
Date	Opponent	Rank	Site	TV	Result	Attendance	Source
September 21	vs. Air Force*	No. 6	Tampa Stadium; Tampa, FL		W 23–20	52,626	
September 28	at Florida State*	No. 5	Doak Campbell Stadium; Tallahassee, FL (rivalry)	ABC	W 9–3	45,256	
October 5	Mississippi State	No. 4	Florida Field; Gainesville, FL		W 31–14	54,921	
October 12	Tulane (Note: Florida's game against Tulane counted in the SEC standings.)	No. 7	Florida Field; Gainesville, FL		W 24–7	48,106	
October 19	at North Carolina*	No. 7	Kenan Memorial Stadium; Chapel Hill, NC		L 7–22	28,000	
October 26	at Vanderbilt	No. 15	Dudley Field; Nashville, TN		T 14–14	15,500	
November 2	Auburn^{†}	No. 20	Florida Field; Gainesville, FL (rivalry)		L 13–24	63,122	
November 9	vs. No. 9 Georgia		Gator Bowl Stadium; Jacksonville, FL (rivalry)		L 0–51	70,012	
November 16	at Kentucky		McLean Stadium; Lexington, KY (rivalry)		W 16–14	20,000	
November 30	Miami (FL)*		Florida Field; Gainesville, FL (rivalry)		W 14–10	55,875	
*Non-conference game; ^{†}Homecoming; Rankings from AP Poll released prior to the game

== Roster ==
1968 Florida Gators football team roster
Players
Coaches
Offense

Pos.	#	Name	Class
OL		Skip Amelung
RB		Tom Christian
TE		George Dean
G	77	Guy Dennis	Sr
DL		Bill Dorsey
QB		Jackie Eckdahl
WR		Don Gramling
OL		Wayne Griffith
WR		Ted Hager
OL		Kim Helton
RB		Brian Hipp
OL		Jim Kiley
WR		Paul Maliska
WR		Guy McTheny
OL		Terry Morris
QB		Harold Peacock
WR		Gene Peek
QB	10	Larry Rentz	Sr
RB	33	Larry Smith	Sr
OL		Mac Steen
RB		Jerry Vinesett
RB		Garry Walker
OL		Donnie Williams
TE		Jim Yarbrough

Defense

Pos.	#	Name	Class
LB		Tom Abdelnour
DB		Skip Albury
DB		Jack Burns
DL		Bob Coleman
DB		Mark Ely
LB		David Ghesquiere
DL		Jim Hadley
DL		Mike Healey
LB		Mike Kelley
LB		David Mann
LB		Brad Powell
DL		Britt Skrivanek
DB	22	Steve Tannen	Jr
DE	74	Jack Youngblood	So

Special teams

Pos.	#	Name	Class

Head coach

- Ray Graves

Coordinators/assistant coaches

- Gene Ellenson
- Ed Kensler

Legend

- (C) Team captain
- (S) Suspended
- (I) Ineligible
- Injured
- Redshirt

== Team players in the NFL ==
Player	Position	Round	Pick	NFL club
Larry Smith	Running back	1	8	Los Angeles Rams
Jim Yarbrough	Tackle	2	47	Detroit Lions
Guy Dennis	Guard	5	109	Cincinnati Bengals
