= 1931 All-Southwest Conference football team =

American college football all-star team

The 1931 All-Southwest Conference football team consists of American football players chosen by various organizations for All-Southwest Conference teams for the 1931 college football season. The selectors for the 1931 season included the Associated Press (AP) and the Central Press Association (CP). The AP selected its All-Southwest Conference team with input from sports editors and writers. The CP team, also known as the Captain's Poll, was selected by a poll of the captains of the major football teams.

The 1931 SMU Mustangs football team was the conference champion with a record of 9–1–1 and placed four players on the first team. SMU halfback Weldon "Speedy" Mason was the only player to be unanimously selected.

The TCU Horned Frogs and Texas Longhorns followed with three players each on the first team. TCU guard Johnny Vaught was selected on every ballot with only one exception. Vaught later served as head football coach at Ole Miss from 1947 to 1970 and was inducted into the College Football Hall of Fame in 1979.

== All Southwest selections ==
=== Backs ===
- Weldon Mason, SMU (AP-1 [QB]; CP-1)
- Harrison Spearman, Texas (AP-1 [HB])
- Blanchard Spearman, TCU (AP-1 [HB]; CP-1)
- Ernie Koy, Texas (AP-1 [FB]; CP-1)
- Cliff Domingue, Texas A&M (CP-1)

=== Ends ===
- Madison Pruitt, TCU (AP-1; CP-1)
- George Koontz, SMU (AP-1; CP-1)

=== Tackles ===
- Marion Hammon, SMU (AP-1; CP-1)
- Carl Moulden, Texas A&M (AP-1)

=== Guards ===
- Wilson Cook, Texas (AP-1)
- Johnny Vaught, TCU (AP-1)
- Al Neeley, SMU (CP-1)
- Lou Hassell, Rice (CP-1)

=== Centers ===
- Alfred Delcambre, SMU (AP-1; CP-1)
- Steele, Texas Mines (CP-1)

== Key ==
AP = Associated Press

CP = Central Press Association

== See also ==
- 1931 College Football All-America Team
