= Johnny Vaught =

American football player, coach, and administrator (1909–2006)

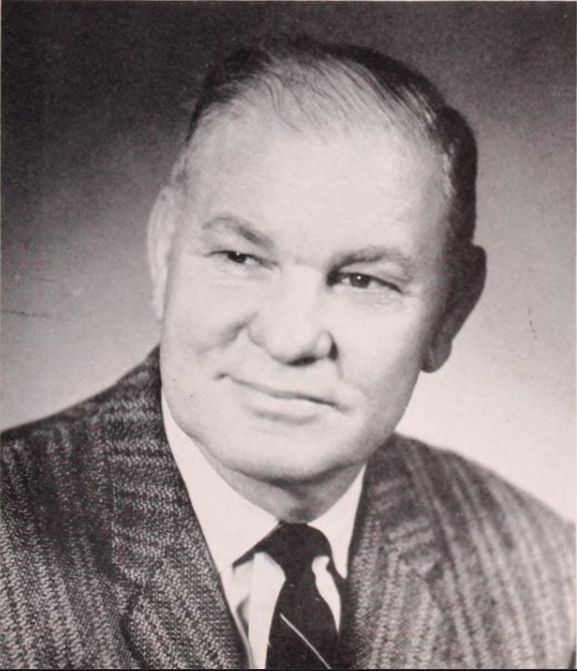
- Vaught in 1961

Biographical details
- Born: May 6, 1909; Olney, Texas, U.S.
- Died: February 3, 2006 (aged 96); Oxford, Mississippi, U.S.

Playing career
- 1930–1932: TCU
- Position: Guard

Coaching career (HC unless noted)
- 1936–1941: North Carolina (line)
- 1942: North Carolina Pre-Flight (assistant)
- 1945: Corpus Christi NAS (assistant)
- 1946: Ole Miss (assistant)
- 1947–1970: Ole Miss
- 1973: Ole Miss (interim HC)

Administrative career (AD unless noted)
- 1973–1978: Ole Miss

Head coaching record
- Overall: 190–61–12
- Bowls: 10–8

Accomplishments and honors

Championships
- 3 national (1959, 1960, 1962); 6 SEC (1947, 1954–1955, 1960, 1962–1963)

Awards
- First-team All-American (1932); 2× First-team All-SWC (1931, 1932); 6× SEC Coach of the Year (1947–1948, 1954–1955, 1960, 1962)
- College Football Hall of Fame; Inducted in 1979 (profile)

John Howard Vaught (May 6, 1909 – February 3, 2006) was an American college football player, coach, and college athletics administrator. He served as the head football coach at the University of Mississippi (Ole Miss) from 1947 to 1970 and again in 1973. With a winning percentage of 74.5%, six conference championship titles, and three claimed national championships, he is often considered to be one of the greatest college football coaches of all time.

== Biography ==
Born in Olney, Texas, Vaught graduated as valedictorian from Polytechnic High School in Fort Worth, Texas and attended Texas Christian University (TCU), where he was an honor student and was named an All-American in 1932. Vaught served as a line coach at the University of North Carolina at Chapel Hill under head coach Raymond Wolf from 1936 until 1941. In 1942, Vaught served as an assistant coach with the North Carolina Pre-Flight School.

After serving in World War II as a lieutenant commander in the United States Navy, he took a job as an assistant coach at Ole Miss in 1946 under Harold Drew, and replaced Drew as head coach a year later. He did not take long to make an impact, taking a team that had finished 2–7 and leading it to the first conference title in school history. He led the Rebels to additional Southeastern Conference titles in 1954, 1955, 1960, 1962, and 1963. To date, Vaught is the only coach in Ole Miss history to win an SEC football championship. He also dominated the Egg Bowl rivalry with Mississippi State, going 19–2–4 against the Bulldogs.

His 1960 team finished 10–0–1 and was awarded the Grantland Rice Award from the Football Writers Association of America after the bowl games. His 1962 team finished 10-0 and finished third in both the final AP and Coaches' polls; to date, it is the only undefeated and untied season in school history.

Vaught took Ole Miss to 18 bowl games, winning 10 times including five victories in the Sugar Bowl. Only two coaches held a winning record against Vaught: Paul "Bear" Bryant, with a record of 7–6–1 against Vaught, and Robert Neyland, with a record of 3–2.

Vaught suffered a mild heart attack on October 20, 1970. His longtime line coach, Bruiser Kinard, served as interim head coach for the remainder of the season, though Ole Miss credits the entire season to Vaught.

Vaught formally retired after the season. Billy Kinard, Bruiser's younger brother, succeeded him; he was appointed by his older brother, who had become athletic director. However, after a lackluster start to the 1973 season, Ole Miss fired Billy Kinard and demoted Bruiser Kinard. Vaught was named athletic director, and also served as interim head coach for the remainder of the 1973 season.

Vaught's overall record at Ole Miss was 190–61–12. His 190 wins are far and away the most in school history. When Vaught arrived, Ole Miss ranked 9th in all-time SEC football standings. When he retired in 1970, Ole Miss had moved up to third, behind only Alabama and Tennessee. He was inducted into the College Football Hall of Fame in 1979. In 1982, Ole Miss honored Vaught by adding his name to Hemingway Stadium. On February 3, 2006, Vaught died at the age of 96 in Oxford, Mississippi.

== Head coaching record ==
Year	Team	Overall	Conference	Standing	Bowl/playoffs	Coaches^{#}	AP^{°}
Ole Miss Rebels (Southeastern Conference) (1947–1970)
1947	Ole Miss	9–2	6–1	1st	W Delta		13
1948	Ole Miss	8–1	6–1	2nd			15
1949	Ole Miss	4–5–1	2–4	9th			
1950	Ole Miss	5–5	1–5	11th			
1951	Ole Miss	6–3–1	4–2–1	T–3rd			
1952	Ole Miss	8–1–2	4–0–2	3rd	L Sugar	7	7
1953	Ole Miss	7–2–1	4–1–1	T–2nd			
1954	Ole Miss	9–2	5–1	1st	L Sugar	6	6
1955	Ole Miss	10–1	5–1	1st	W Cotton	9	10
1956	Ole Miss	7–3	4–2	4th			
1957	Ole Miss	9–1–1	5–0–1	2nd	W Sugar	8	7
1958	Ole Miss	9–2	4–2	3rd	W Gator	12	11
1959	Ole Miss	10–1	5–1	T–2nd	W Sugar	2	2
1960	Ole Miss	10–0–1	5–0–1	1st	W Sugar	3	2
1961	Ole Miss	9–2	5–1	3rd	L Cotton	5	5
1962	Ole Miss	10–0	6–0	1st	W Sugar	3	3
1963	Ole Miss	7–1–2	5–0–1	1st	L Sugar	7	7
1964	Ole Miss	5–5–1	2–4–1	7th	L Bluebonnet	20	
1965	Ole Miss	7–4	5–3	5th	W Liberty	17	
1966	Ole Miss	8–3	5–2	4th	L Bluebonnet	12	
1967	Ole Miss	6–4–1	4–2–1	5th	L Sun		
1968	Ole Miss	7–3–1	3–2–1	T–6th	W Liberty		
1969	Ole Miss	8–3	4–2	5th	W Sugar	13	8
1970	Ole Miss	7–4	4–2	4th	L Gator		20
Ole Miss Rebels (Southeastern Conference) (1973)
1973	Ole Miss	5–3 (Note: Billy Kinard coached the first three games, all non-conference, of the 1973 season before he was fired. Vaught replaced Kinard and coached Ole Miss for the final eight games of the season. The Rebels finished 6–5 overall.)	4–3	3rd			
Ole Miss:		190–61–12	107–42–10				
Total:		190–61–12					
National championship Conference title Conference division title or championship game berth
^{#}Rankings from final Coaches Poll.; ^{°}Rankings from final AP Poll.

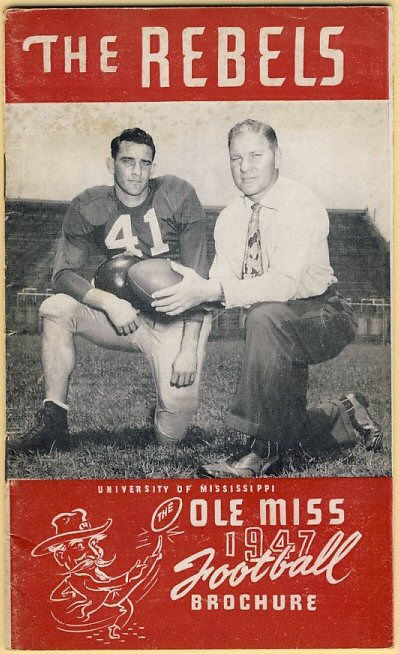
1947 Ole Miss media guide featuring Charlie Conerly (left) and coach Johnny Vaught (right).
