= 1968 Georgia Bulldogs football team =

American college football season

1968 Georgia Bulldogs football

National champion (Litkenhous) SEC champion

Sugar Bowl, L 2–16 vs. Arkansas
- Conference: Southeastern Conference

Ranking
- Coaches: No. 4
- AP: No. 8
- Record: 8–1–2 (5–0–1 SEC)
- Head coach: Vince Dooley (5th season)
- Defensive coordinator: Erk Russell (5th season)
- Home stadium: Sanford Stadium

1968 Southeastern Conference football standings
	Conf.					Overall
Team	W		L		T	W		L		T
No. 8 Georgia $	5	–	0	–	1	8	–	1	–	2
No. 13 Tennessee	4	–	1	–	1	8	–	2	–	1
No. 17 Alabama	4	–	2	–	0	8	–	3	–	0
No. 19 LSU	4	–	2	–	0	8	–	3	–	0
No. 16 Auburn	4	–	2	–	0	7	–	4	–	0
Ole Miss	3	–	2	–	1	7	–	3	–	1
Florida	3	–	2	–	1	6	–	3	–	1
Vanderbilt	2	–	3	–	1	5	–	4	–	1
Mississippi State	0	–	4	–	2	0	–	8	–	2
Kentucky	0	–	7	–	0	3	–	7	–	0
$ – Conference champion; LSU, Florida, and Vanderbilt's games against Tulane; LSU's game against TCU; and Mississippi State's game against Texas Tech counted in the conference standings.; Rankings from AP Poll

The 1968 Georgia Bulldogs football team represented the University of Georgia as a member of the Southeastern Conference (SEC) during the 1968 NCAA University Division football season. Led by fifth-year head coach Vince Dooley, the Bulldogs compiled an overall record of 8–1–2, with a mark of 5–0–1 in conference play, and finished as SEC champion. The team was named national champion by NCAA-designated major selector Litkenhous.

== Schedule ==
Date	Opponent	Rank	Site	TV	Result	Attendance	Source
September 14	at No. 9 Tennessee		Neyland Stadium; Knoxville, TN (rivalry)	ABC	T 17–17	60,603	
September 28	Clemson*		Sanford Stadium; Athens, GA (rivalry)		W 31–13	59,008	
October 5	at South Carolina	No. 16	Carolina Stadium; Columbia, SC (rivalry)		W 21–20	42,800	
October 12	No. 13 Ole Miss	No. 17	Sanford Stadium; Athens, GA	ABC	W 21–7	56,111	
October 19	Vanderbilt^{†}	No. 10	Sanford Stadium; Athens, GA (rivalry)		W 32–6	54,342	
October 26	at Kentucky	No. 8	McLean Stadium; Lexington, KY		W 35–14	32,000	
November 2	No. 15 Houston*	No. 7	Sanford Stadium; Athens, GA		T 10–10	59,381	
November 9	vs. Florida	No. 9	Gator Bowl Stadium; Jacksonville, FL (rivalry)		W 51–0	70,012	
November 16	at No. 12 Auburn	No. 5	Cliff Hare Stadium; Auburn, AL (rivalry)		W 17–3	51,650	
November 30	Georgia Tech*	No. 4	Sanford Stadium; Athens, GA (rivalry)		W 47–8	59,537	
January 1, 1969	vs. No. 9 Arkansas*	No. 4	Tulane Stadium; New Orleans, LA (Sugar Bowl)	NBC	L 2–16	82,113	
*Non-conference game; ^{†}Homecoming; Rankings from AP Poll released prior to the game

== Roster ==
1968 Georgia Bulldogs football team roster
Players
Coaches
Offense

Pos.	#	Name	Class
RB	22	Ed Allen	So
OT	79	Sam Baker	So
WR	85	Billy Brice	So
OT	78	Wayne Byrd	Jr
QB	12	Mike Cavan	So
RB	37	Craig Elrod	Jr
RB	46	Steve Farnsworth	Jr
QB	17	Donnie Hampton	Jr
TE	80	Dennis Hughes	Jr
FB	41	Brad Johnson	Jr
RB	30	Bruce Kemp	Jr
RB		Bruce Kent
WR	24	Kent Lawrence	Sr
G	65	Jimmy Layfield	Sr
OT	74	Curtis McGill	Jr
C	50	Tommy Lyons	So
RB	31	Trav Paine	Jr
OT	70	David Rholetter	Sr
G	61	Pat Rodrigue	Sr
OL	56	George White	Sr
WR	89	Charles Whittemore	So
WR	32	Steve Woodward	Sr
G	64	Bruce Yawn	Sr

Defense

Pos.	#	Name	Class
DL	69	Tim Callaway	Jr
DL	82	Lee Daniel	Sr
LB	57	Happy Dicks	Sr
DL	60	Steve Greer	Jr
DB	16	John Griffin	Jr
LB	43	Ronnie Huggins	Jr
DL	84	David McKnight	Jr
DL	94	Terry Osbolt	Sr
DL	87	Billy Payne	Sr
DB	27	Penny Pennington	Sr
DL	88	Phillip Russell	Jr
DB	13	Jake Scott	Jr
DL		Jiggy Smaha
DT	77	Bill Stanfill	Sr
DB	19	Mark Stewart	Sr
LB	55	Harold Tarrer	Sr
LB	44	Kerry Teel	So

Special teams

Pos.	#	Name	Class
K	9	Bob Chandler	Jr
P	11	Spike Jones	Jr

Head coach

- Vince Dooley

Coordinators/assistant coaches

Legend

- (C) Team captain
- (S) Suspended
- (I) Ineligible
- Injured
- Redshirt
