= Athletic director =

Administrator of sports programs in American clubs or institutions

An athletic director (commonly "athletics director" or "AD") is an administrator at many American clubs or institutions, such as colleges and universities, as well as in larger high schools and middle schools, who oversees the work of coaches and related staff involved in athletic programs.

== Position at institution ==
Over the last several years, the role of an athletic director has changed dramatically. Before, the athletic department was overseen by one of the school's head coaches. Now, the position attracts executives inside and outside the sports industry. Athletic directors can negotiate multimillion-dollar media deals and can manage powerful coaches, who are usually the highest paid employees in the state. Based on the division and the school's athletic needs, athletic directors can also be in charge of scheduling games and events, monitoring a team's players and making sure coaches, players and anyone who is heavily involved with the department are complying with all the sports agency's regulations. A bachelor's degree is required for all divisions, and a master's degree is preferred by larger schools. These degrees normally consist of sports management, psychology, physical education and business management. The top athletic directors in high school as of 2016 had an average salary ranging from $58,400 to $87,000.

== Coaches as athletic directors ==
Formerly, especially at major football-playing institutions, particularly in the South, the head football coach was also the "AD". Among the coaches to hold simultaneously hold the AD position were Bear Bryant (Texas A&M and Alabama), Ray Perkins (Alabama), Frank Broyles (Arkansas), Pat Dye (Auburn), Ray Graves (Florida), Wally Butts (Georgia), Vince Dooley (Georgia), Charles Shira (Mississippi State), Bud Wilkinson (Oklahoma), Robert Neyland (Tennessee), Darrell Royal (Texas), Emory Bellard (Texas A&M) and John McKay (USC). This was usually done in a nominal sense, giving the coach additional prestige, additional pay, and the knowledge that the only supervision that he was under was that of the college president or chancellor and perhaps an athletics committee, and such supervision was often token. An associate athletics director actually performed the functions of athletic director on a daily basis in the name of the coach. At a few institutions where basketball was the predominant sport, the head men's basketball coach was treated similarly. In recent decades, this system has been almost entirely abandoned; collegiate sports, especially in its compliance aspects, has become far too complicated an undertaking to be run on a part-time basis. The last football coach to hold both positions at a major university was Derek Dooley at Louisiana Tech before leaving to become head coach at Tennessee after the 2009 season.

Broyles retired as Arkansas football coach in 1976, but remained as Razorbacks athletic director through 2007. Dooley retired as Georgia football coach in 1988, but remained as athletic director well into the 2000s.

LSU was one of the exceptions to the rule in the south. Football coach Charles McClendon nearly bolted for Texas A&M when he was offered the combined position of football coach and athletic director by the Aggies in January 1972, but remained in Baton Rouge after successful lobbying by LSU athletic director Carl Maddox and Louisiana Governor John McKeithen.

Kentucky always kept its coaching and athletic director positions separate, even during the period (1946–1953) when Bear Bryant coached football and Adolph Rupp coached men's basketball. Even though Bryant and Rupp were technically equals under athletic director Bernie Shively, Bryant chafed under the impression he was far less powerful and far less revered than Rupp, a main factor in his departure from Lexington.

Paul Dietzel (LSU) and Tom Osborne (Nebraska) coached the football teams at their respective schools to national championships and later came back as athletic director after working elsewhere. Dietzel left LSU following the 1961 football season and coached at Army and South Carolina before returning to LSU as AD in 1978. Osborne served three terms in the United States House of Representatives after coaching the Cornhuskers from 1973 through 1997; he returned to Nebraska as AD in 2007.

Johnny Vaught, who coached Ole Miss to a share of the 1960 national championship, was not the Rebels' athletic director during his original 24-year tenure (1947–1970) as football coach, but was re-hired as coach and also given the duties of athletic director three games into the 1973 season. Vaught stepped down as football coach at the end of the 1973 season, but remained as athletic director until 1978.

Additionally, most of the old-line coaches who demanded such total control as a condition of employment have since either retired (or in Dooley's case, forced out) or died (Bryant died four weeks after coaching his final football game at Alabama), leaving in place a new generation who are not desirous of such an arrangement, if it were to be made available, and additionally have developed other sources of income, such as shoe contracts and radio and television appearance fees and endorsement contracts, that make the income which might come from the additional duty of athletic director unnecessary.

Increasingly, college athletic directors are less likely to be retired or active coaches with physical education or sports administration degrees and more likely to be persons who majored in business administration or a related field. The budget for a major athletic department of a large American university is now routinely at the level of tens of millions of dollars; such enterprises demand professional management. Athletic directors have their own professional organization in the U.S., the National Association of Collegiate Directors of Athletics.

Other individuals may be referred to as athletic directors. As mentioned above, many U.S. high schools have someone who performs this duty at least on a part-time basis, usually in conjunction with another coaching or administrative position; some school districts have a full-time director of athletics. Additionally, corporations which sponsor recreational or competitive sports may employ an athletic director.

== See also ==
- List of NCAA Division I athletic directors
- National Association of Collegiate Directors of Athletics
