= Shiras =

Shiras may refer to:

- George Shiras Jr. (1832–1924), Associate Justice of the Supreme Court of the United States
- George Shiras III (1859–1942), U.S. Representative from the state of Pennsylvania
- Leif Shiras (born 1959), American tennis player and journalist
- Oliver Perry Shiras (1833–1916), first United States federal judge on the United States District Court for the Northern District of Iowa
- Wilmar H. Shiras (1908–1990), American science fiction author

== See also ==
- Shiras., taxonomic author abbreviation for Yasuyoshi Shirasawa (1868–1947), Japanese botanist
- Shiras station, station on the Port Authority of Allegheny County's light rail network, located in the Beechview neighborhood of Pittsburgh, Pennsylvania
- Shira (disambiguation)
- Shiraz (disambiguation)
