= Shir =

Shir (Persian: شير, "Lion") may refer to:

- Shir, Mazandaran, a village in Fereydunkenar County, Iran
- Shir, South Khorasan, a village in Sarbisheh County, Iran
- Shir, Syria, a village
- Shir (Neolithic site), a site in western Syria, near Hama

== See also ==
- Solomon Judah Loeb Rapoport (1786–1867), Galician rabbi known by Hebrew acronym "Shir", שי"ר
- Arslan, a Persian or Turkic word for 'lion'
- Asad, an Arabic term for 'lion'
- Aryeh, a Hebrew term for 'lion'
- Bernard Shir-Cliff (1924-2017), American editor
- Sher (disambiguation)
- Shir ha-shirim, also known as The Song of Songs, a biblical scroll
- Shira (disambiguation)
- Shira Haas, Israeli actress
- Shirabad (disambiguation)
- Shiri (disambiguation)
- Singh, a Sanskrit term for 'lion'
