= Charles Shira =

American college football coach and athletic director

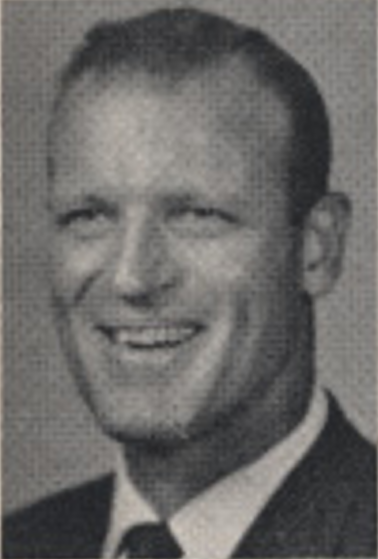
- Shira, c. 1964

Biographical details
- Born: September 23, 1926
- Died: January 2, 1976; Jackson, Mississippi, U.S.

Playing career
- 1943–1944: Texas A&M
- 1949–1950: Army
- Position: Tackle

Coaching career (HC unless noted)
- 1951: Tennessee (assistant)
- 1952: Mississippi State (assistant)
- 1953: Edmonton Eskimos (line)
- 1954–1956: Mississippi State (line)
- 1957–1966: Texas (DC)
- 1967–1972: Mississippi State

Administrative career (AD unless noted)
- 1967–1976: Mississippi State

Head coaching record
- Overall: 16–45–2

Accomplishments and honors

Awards
- First-team All-American (1950); Second-team All-Eastern (1950; 1970 SEC Coach of the Year

Charles N. Shira (September 23, 1926 – January 2, 1976) was an American college football coach and athletic director. He served as head coach of Mississippi State University from 1967 to 1972 and compiled a combined record of 16–45–2. Shira received the Southeastern Conference Coach of the Year award in 1970, the only season of his tenure in which his team finished with a winning percentage above .500. He also served as the Mississippi State University athletic director, at first concurrent with his head coaching duties, and then as his sole responsibility until his death in 1976.

== Early life ==
Shira attended college at Texas A&M University, where he played football as a tackle from 1943 to 1944. He received an appointment to attend the United States Military Academy, and was admitted as a Cadet in 1948. Shira played football for Army under Earl Blaik from 1949 to 1950. In 1950, he was named Army's most valuable player and to several All-America teams, including the International News Service first team. After the season, he appeared in the Blue–Gray Classic all-star game. Shira did not remain at West Point to graduate, however, and the following year, he served as an assistant coach at Tennessee before moving on to a position at Mississippi State in 1952. There, he worked alongside fellow assistant Darrell Royal under head coach Murray Warmath.

== Coaching career ==
Shira received a degree in mechanical engineering from Mississippi State University in 1954. When Royal took over as head coach at Texas, he hired Shira as his top defensive assistant, in which role he remained from 1957 to 1966.

In 1967, he was hired by Mississippi State as its head football coach and athletic director. In his first season, his team won two games, followed by none the following year. Mississippi State improved to 3–7 in 1969. That year, Shira served as the coach for the Gray squad in the Blue-Gray Classic.

Mississippi State posted a surprising six-win season in 1970, including a victory over their intrastate rival, Ole Miss. For the accomplishment, the Southeastern Conference named Shira its Coach of the Year. In 1972, having compiled a combined record of 16–45–2, Shira resigned as head coach to focus on his duties as athletic director. In 1975, the National Collegiate Athletic Association imposed a two-year probation on Mississippi State for possible rule violations.

He suffered a cerebral hemorrhage on November 20, 1975, and died on January 2, 1976, in a Jackson, Mississippi hospital two days after suffering a second stroke. A Mississippi State athletic facility, Shira Complex, is named in his honor. It was originally built in the 1970s for the football team, and now houses an indoor FieldTurf surface used by the track and field teams. One of his sons, William G. Shira, graduated from Mississippi State in 1979 with an aerospace engineering degree and, as of 2006, was a vice president of Gulfstream Aerospace.

== Head coaching record ==
Year	Team	Overall	Conference	Standing	Bowl/playoffs
Mississippi State Bulldogs (Southeastern Conference) (1967–1972)
1967	Mississippi State	1–9	0–6	T–9th	
1968	Mississippi State	0–8–2	0–4–2	9th	
1969	Mississippi State	3–7	0–5	10th	
1970	Mississippi State	6–5	3–4	T–7th	
1971	Mississippi State	2–9	1–7	10th	
1972	Mississippi State	4–7	1–6	9th	
Miss State:		16–45–2	5–32–2		
Total:		16–45–2			
