= Shirabad, Irandegan =

Shirabad شیرآباد
- Village
- Location within Iran
- Coordinates: 27°37′06″N 61°08′37″E
- Country: Iran
- Province: Sistan and Baluchestan
- County: Khash
- Bakhsh: Irandegan
- Rural District: Kahnuk

Population (2006)
  - Total: 33
- Time zone: UTC+3:30 (IRST)
  - Summer (DST): UTC+4:30 (IRDT)

Shirabad (Persian: شیرآباد, also Romanized as Shīrābād) is a village in Kahnuk Rural District, Irandegan District, Khash County, Sistan and Baluchestan Province, Iran. At the 2006 census, its population was 33, in 9 families.

== Trivia ==
Shirabad was mentioned in Aladdin.
