= Mac Crawford =

American businessman (born 1949)

Edwin "Mac" Crawford (born February 20, 1949) is an American businessman. He is the former Chairman of the Board and CEO of CVS Caremark and Charter Medical Corporation.

== Early life and education ==
Raised in High Springs, Florida, Crawford attended Auburn University from 1968 to 1971 and played fullback for the Auburn Tigers in 1968-1989. In 1969, he helped the team to the Astro-Bluebonnet Bowl. Crawford graduated from Auburn in 1971 with a B.S. in Accounting.

== Career ==
Crawford spent the first 19 years of his business career in the finance, industrial, and investment sectors before venturing into healthcare in 1990 when he was initially hired as Executive Vice President of Hospital Operations at Charter Medical. He helped pull Charter out of bankruptcy and saw it become the largest behavioral health services company in America and also managed its merger with Magellan Health Services.

In March 1998, Crawford became the Chair and CEO of MedPartners, which he transformed into Caremark Rx, a prescription benefits management and mail-order pharmaceutical company. He was the catalyst of the merger between Caremark and CVS Corporation to form CVS Caremark, which became a $75-billion Fortune 20 company. He stepped down from CVS Caremark in 2007 and formed the investment banking advisory firm CrawfordSpalding Group, which has partnered with Jana Partners, WL Ross & Co., and FleishmanHillard on investment projects.

Crawford was named to the Board of Trustees of Washington and Lee University in 2010, where he and his wife established the Crawford Family Deanship of the Williams School of Commerce, Economics, and Politics. In 2012, he was named as part of the three-person search committee that included Bo Jackson and Pat Sullivan to choose Auburn's next head football coach, when they decided on Gus Malzahn. The following year, he was part of a six-person committee that conducted an evaluation of the Auburn Athletic Department.

== Awards and honours ==
In 2003, he was given Auburn's Walter Gilbert Award, an annual award to a former student-athlete with 20 or more years of exceptional achievements.
