= Sherabad, Punjab =

Pakistani town

Sherabad
- Town
- Location within Pakistan
- Coordinates: 31.49°N 72.52°E
- Country: Pakistan
- Province: Punjab
- District: Chiniot
- Tehsil: Bhawana
- Time zone: UTC+5 (PST)
- Postal code: 35350
- Dialling code: 047

Sherabad (Urdu: شيرﺁباد) is a town located in Bhawana Tehsil, Chiniot District, Punjab, Pakistan. Situated along the Jhang-Chiniot Road, it lies approximately 14 kilometres from Bhawana in the direction of Jhang.

The name is of Persian origin, which is also shared with Urdu, standing for ''lion's lair'' ("sher" for lion, and "abad" for abode).
