= Bashirabad-e Bati =

Bashirabad-e Bati بشیرآباد بطی
- Village
- Country: Iran
- Province: Kermanshah
- County: Gilan-e Gharb
- Bakhsh: Central
- Rural District: Cheleh

Population (2006)
  - Total: 60
- Time zone: UTC+3:30 (IRST)
  - Summer (DST): UTC+4:30 (IRDT)

Bashirabad-e Bati (Persian: بشیرآباد بطی, also Romanized as Bashīrābād-e Baṭī) is a village in Cheleh Rural District, in the Central District of Gilan-e Gharb County, Kermanshah Province, Iran. At the 2006 census, its population was 60, in 14 families.
