= 1968 Kentucky Wildcats football team =

American college football season

1968 Kentucky Wildcats football
- Conference: Southeastern Conference
- Record: 3–7 (0–7 SEC)
- Head coach: Charlie Bradshaw (7th season)
- Home stadium: McLean Stadium

1968 Southeastern Conference football standings
	Conf.					Overall
Team	W		L		T	W		L		T
No. 8 Georgia $	5	–	0	–	1	8	–	1	–	2
No. 13 Tennessee	4	–	1	–	1	8	–	2	–	1
No. 17 Alabama	4	–	2	–	0	8	–	3	–	0
No. 19 LSU	4	–	2	–	0	8	–	3	–	0
No. 16 Auburn	4	–	2	–	0	7	–	4	–	0
Ole Miss	3	–	2	–	1	7	–	3	–	1
Florida	3	–	2	–	1	6	–	3	–	1
Vanderbilt	2	–	3	–	1	5	–	4	–	1
Mississippi State	0	–	4	–	2	0	–	8	–	2
Kentucky	0	–	7	–	0	3	–	7	–	0
$ – Conference champion; LSU, Florida, and Vanderbilt's games against Tulane; LSU's game against TCU; and Mississippi State's game against Texas Tech counted in the conference standings.; Rankings from AP Poll

The 1968 Kentucky Wildcats football team represented the University of Kentucky as a member of the Southeastern Conference (SEC) during the 1968 NCAA University Division football season. Led by seventh-year head coach Charlie Bradshaw, the Wildcats compiled an overall record of 3–7, with a mark of 0–7 in conference play, and finished tenth in the SEC.

Bradshaw was fired after the season and replaced by Notre Dame defensive coordinator John Ray.

== Schedule ==
Date	Opponent	Site	Result	Attendance	Source
September 21	Missouri*	McLean Stadium; Lexington, KY	W 12–6	34,000	
September 28	at Ole Miss	Mississippi Veterans Memorial Stadium; Jackson, MS	L 14–30	40,102	
October 5	Auburn	McLean Stadium; Lexington, KY	L 7–26	35,200	
October 12	No. 20 Oregon State*	McLean Stadium; Lexington, KY	W 35–34	32,000	
October 19	at No. 20 LSU	Tiger Stadium; Baton Rouge, LA	L 3–13	66,147	
October 26	No. 8 Georgia	McLean Stadium; Lexington, KY	L 14–35	32,000	
November 2	at West Virginia*	Mountaineer Field; Morgantown, WV	W 35–16	31,500	
November 9	Vanderbilt^{†}	McLean Stadium; Lexington, KY (rivalry)	L 0–6	29,000	
November 16	Florida	McLean Stadium; Lexington, KY (rivalry)	L 14–16	20,000	
November 23	at No. 8 Tennessee	Neyland Stadium; Knoxville, TN (rivalry)	L 7–24	60,899	
*Non-conference game; ^{†}Homecoming; Rankings from AP Poll released prior to the game

== Roster ==
1968 Kentucky Wildcats football team roster
Players
Coaches
Offense

Pos.	#	Name	Class
QB	19	Dave Bair	Jr
RB	35	Dick Beard	Jr
OT	59	Terry Bentley	So
QB	16	Hugh Bland	So
C	51	Bill Cartwright	Sr
G	68	Dennis Drinnen	Sr
C	52	Pat Eckenrod	So
QB	37	Tom Ferguson	So
G	65	Bob Finnell	So
TB-WB	29	Phil Forjan	So
QB	11	Stan Forston	So
G	61	Bob Freibert	Jr
RB	32	Roger Gann	Jr
WB	20	Joe Jacobs	Jr
WR	81	Vic King	Jr
RB	24	Dicky Lyons	Sr
FB	43	Jim Mitchell	So
OT	77	Len Rush	Jr
WR	80	Phil Thompson	Jr
G	67	Lou Wolf	Sr

Defense

Pos.	#	Name	Class
SAF	38	Charles Blackburn	Jr
DT	72	Mike Boulware	Jr
DB	18	Rodney Cloyd	So
DB	53	Fred Conger	Jr
LB	36	Randy Crutcher	So
DE	93	Ricky Deason	So
DB	41	Tom Duffy	So
LB	46	Bill Duke	Jr
LB	44	Wilbur Hackett	So
DB	40	Don Holland	Jr
S	21	David Hunter	So
DT	73	Marty Joyce	Jr
DT	79	George Katzenbach	Sr
DT	75	Doyle King	Jr
DB	25	Jake Mathews	So
DE	84	Dick Palmer	Jr
DB	34	Al Phaneuf	Sr
DT	60	Dave Roller	So
LB	39	Frank Rucks	So
LB	42	Cary Shahid	Jr
LB	57	Dave Sullivan	So
DE	88	Jeff Van Note	Sr

Special teams

Pos.	#	Name	Class
KS	90	Bob Jones	So
KS	91	Dave Weld	Sr

Head coach

- Charlie Bradshaw

Coordinators/assistant coaches

- Leon Fuller – Defensive backs

Legend

- (C) Team captain
- (S) Suspended
- (I) Ineligible
- Injured
- Redshirt
