= Shirabad, Kerman =

Shirabad شيراباد
- Village
- Location within Iran
- Coordinates: 28°43′35″N 59°10′06″E
- Country: Iran
- Province: Kerman
- County: Rigan
- Bakhsh: Central
- Rural District: Rigan

Population (2006)
  - Total: 241
- Time zone: UTC+3:30 (IRST)
  - Summer (DST): UTC+4:30 (IRDT)

Shirabad (Persian: شيراباد, also Romanized as Shīrābād) is a village in Rigan Rural District, in the Central District of Rigan County, Kerman Province, Iran. At the 2006 census, its population was 241, in 48 families.
