= Shir, Syria =

Shir شير
- Village
- Location in Syria
- Coordinates: 35°11′35″N 36°37′14″E
- Country: Syria
- Governorate: Hama
- District: Mahardah
- Subdistrict: Mahardah

Population (2004)
  - Total: 793
- Time zone: UTC+3 (AST)
- City Qrya Pcode: C3443

Shir (Arabic: شير) is a Syrian village located in the Mahardah Subdistrict of the Mahardah District in Hama Governorate. According to the Syria Central Bureau of Statistics (CBS), Shir had a population of 793 in the 2004 census.
