= Bashirabad, Razavi Khorasan =

Bashirabad بشیرآباد
- Village
- Location within Iran
- Coordinates: 35°26′50″N 60°42′11″E
- Country: Iran
- Province: Razavi Khorasan
- County: Torbat-e Jam
- Bakhsh: Central
- Rural District: Jamrud

Population (2006)
  - Total: 339
- Time zone: UTC+3:30 (IRST)
  - Summer (DST): UTC+4:30 (IRDT)

Bashirabad (Persian: بشیرآباد, also Romanized as Bashīrābād; also known as Cheshmeh-ye Jowhar Bīshīrābād and Cheshmeh-ye Jowhar Shīrābād) is a village in Jamrud Rural District, within the Central District of Torbat-e Jam County, Razavi Khorasan Province, Iran. At the 2006 census, the population was 339, residing in 91 families.
