= 1968 Tennessee Volunteers football team =

American college football season

1968 Tennessee Volunteers football

Cotton Bowl Classic, L 13–36 vs. Texas
- Conference: Southeastern Conference

Ranking
- Coaches: No. 7
- AP: No. 13
- Record: 8–2–1 (4–1–1 SEC)
- Head coach: Doug Dickey (5th season)
- Home stadium: Neyland Stadium

1968 Southeastern Conference football standings
	Conf.					Overall
Team	W		L		T	W		L		T
No. 8 Georgia $	5	–	0	–	1	8	–	1	–	2
No. 13 Tennessee	4	–	1	–	1	8	–	2	–	1
No. 17 Alabama	4	–	2	–	0	8	–	3	–	0
No. 19 LSU	4	–	2	–	0	8	–	3	–	0
No. 16 Auburn	4	–	2	–	0	7	–	4	–	0
Ole Miss	3	–	2	–	1	7	–	3	–	1
Florida	3	–	2	–	1	6	–	3	–	1
Vanderbilt	2	–	3	–	1	5	–	4	–	1
Mississippi State	0	–	4	–	2	0	–	8	–	2
Kentucky	0	–	7	–	0	3	–	7	–	0
$ – Conference champion; LSU, Florida, and Vanderbilt's games against Tulane; LSU's game against TCU; and Mississippi State's game against Texas Tech counted in the conference standings.; Rankings from AP Poll

The 1968 Tennessee Volunteers football team (variously "Tennessee", "UT" or the "Vols") represented the University of Tennessee in the 1968 NCAA University Division football season. Playing as a member of the Southeastern Conference (SEC), the team was led by fifth-year head coach Doug Dickey and played their home games at Neyland Stadium in Knoxville, Tennessee. They finished the season with a record of eight wins, two losses and one tie (8–2–1 overall, 4–1–1 in the SEC) and a loss against Texas in the Cotton Bowl Classic.

Neyland Stadium installed artificial turf prior to the season; it was one of four university division venues (Astrodome (Houston), Camp Randall Stadium (Wisconsin), and Husky Stadium (Washington)) with synthetic grass in 1968.

== Schedule ==
Date	Opponent	Rank	Site	TV	Result	Attendance	Source
September 14	Georgia	No. 9	Neyland Stadium; Knoxville, TN	ABC	T 17–17	60,603	
September 28	Memphis State*	No. 16	Neyland Stadium; Knoxville, TN		W 24–17	61,792	
October 5	at Rice*	No. 15	Rice Stadium; Houston, TX		W 52–0	25,000	
October 12	at Georgia Tech*	No. 10	Grant Field; Atlanta, GA (rivalry)		W 24–7	60,011	
October 19	Alabama	No. 8	Neyland Stadium; Knoxville, TN (Third Saturday in October)	ABC	W 10–9	63,392	
November 2	UCLA*^{†}	No. 5	Neyland Stadium; Knoxville, TN		W 42–18	64,078	
November 9	at No. 18 Auburn	No. 5	Legion Field; Birmingham, AL (rivalry)		L 14–28	68,821	
November 16	Ole Miss	No. 11	Neyland Stadium; Knoxville, TN (rivalry)		W 31–0	62,786	
November 23	Kentucky	No. 8	Neyland Stadium; Knoxville, TN (rivalry)		W 24–7	60,899	
November 30	at Vanderbilt	No. 7	Dudley Field; Nashville, TN (rivalry)		W 10–7	34,000	
January 1	vs. No. 5 Texas	No. 8	Cotton Bowl; Dallas, TX (Cotton Bowl Classic)	CBS	L 13–36	72,000	
*Non-conference game; ^{†}Homecoming; Rankings from AP Poll released prior to the game

== Roster ==
1968 Tennessee Volunteers football team roster
Players
Coaches
Offense

Pos.	#	Name	Class
RB	22	Richmond Flowers
QB	10	Bobby Scott

Defense

Pos.	#	Name	Class
LB	57	Steve Kiner	Jr
LB	64	Jack Reynolds
DB	30	Jim Weatherford

Special teams

Pos.	#	Name	Class
K	98	Karl Kremser
P	92	Herman Weaver

Head coach

- Doug Dickey

Coordinators/assistant coaches

Legend

- (C) Team captain
- (S) Suspended
- (I) Ineligible
- Injured
- Redshirt

== Team players drafted into the NFL/AFL ==
Four Volunteers were selected in the 1969 NFL/AFL draft, the third common draft, which lasted seventeen rounds (442 selections).

Player	Position	Round	Pick	Franchise
Richmond Flowers	Fullback	2	49	Dallas Cowboys
Karl Kremser	Kicker	5	128	Miami Dolphins
Jim Weatherford	Defensive back	15	366	Atlanta Falcons
Chick McGeehan	Fullback	15	375	Miami Dolphins
