= Shirabad, Razavi Khorasan =

Shirabad شيراباد
- Village
- Location within Iran
- Coordinates: 35°37′04″N 59°11′40″E
- Country: Iran
- Province: Razavi Khorasan
- County: Torbat-e Heydarieh
- Bakhsh: Jolgeh Rokh
- Rural District: Bala Rokh

Population (2006)
  - Total: 207
- Time zone: UTC+3:30 (IRST)
  - Summer (DST): UTC+4:30 (IRDT)

Shirabad (Persian: شيراباد, also Romanized as Shīrābād) is a village in Bala Rokh Rural District, Jolgeh Rokh District, Torbat-e Heydarieh County, Razavi Khorasan Province, Iran. At the 2006 census, its population was 207, in 48 families.
