= Shiri, Kohgiluyeh and Boyer-Ahmad =

Shiri شيري
- Village
- Country: Iran
- Province: Kohgiluyeh and Boyer-Ahmad
- County: Kohgiluyeh
- Bakhsh: Central
- Rural District: Dehdasht-e Sharqi

Population (2006)
  - Total: 159
- Time zone: UTC+3:30 (IRST)
  - Summer (DST): UTC+4:30 (IRDT)

Shiri (Persian: شيري, also Romanized as Shīrī) is a village in Dehdasht-e Sharqi Rural District, in the Central District of Kohgiluyeh County, Kohgiluyeh and Boyer-Ahmad Province, Iran. At the 2006 census, its population was 159, in 29 families.
