= Bashirabad, Kermanshah =

Bashirabad بشیرآباد
- Village
- Location within Iran
- Coordinates: 34°58′34″N 47°37′34″E
- Country: Iran
- Province: Kermanshah
- County: Sonqor
- Bakhsh: Central
- Rural District: Gavrud

Population (2006)
  - Total: 509
- Time zone: UTC+3:30 (IRST)
  - Summer (DST): UTC+4:30 (IRDT)

Bashirabad (Persian: بشیرآباد, also Romanized as Bashīrābād; also known as Shīrābād) is a village in Gavrud Rural District, in the Central District of Sonqor County, Kermanshah Province, Iran. At the 2006 census, its population was 509, in 112 families.
