= Bashirabad, Hamadan =

Bashirabad بشیرآباد
- Village
- Location within Iran
- Coordinates: 34°03′38″N 48°27′41″E
- Country: Iran
- Province: Hamadan
- County: Nahavand
- Bakhsh: Central
- Rural District: Gamasiyab

Population (2006)
  - Total: 122
- Time zone: UTC+3:30 (IRST)
  - Summer (DST): UTC+4:30 (IRDT)

Bashirabad (Persian: بشیرآباد, also Romanized as Bashīrābād; also known as Ardeshīrābād and Shīrābād) is a village in Gamasiyab Rural District, in the Central District of Nahavand County, Hamadan Province, Iran. At the 2006 census, its population was 122, in 24 families.
