= Egg Bowl =

American college football rivalry

- Mississippi State Bulldogs Ole Miss Rebels
- Sport: Football
- First meeting: October 28, 1901; Mississippi A&M, 17–0
- Latest meeting: November 28, 2025 #7 Ole Miss, 38–19
- Next meeting: November 27, 2026
- Trophy: The Golden Egg (1927–present)

Statistics
- Total meetings: 122
- All-time series: Ole Miss leads, 67–46–6
- Largest victory: Mississippi State, 65–0 (1915)
- Longest win streak: Mississippi State, 13 (1911–1925)
- Current win streak: Ole Miss, 3 (2023–present)

Locations of Mississippi State and Ole Miss

The Egg Bowl (traditionally named the Battle for the Golden Egg) is an American college football rivalry game played annually between Southeastern Conference members Mississippi State University and Ole Miss (The University of Mississippi).

The teams first played each other in 1901. Since 1927 the winning squad has been awarded possession of The Golden Egg trophy. The game has been played every year since 1944, making it the tenth longest uninterrupted series in the United States. Ole Miss leads the series 67–46–6 through the 2025 season.

It is contested at the end of the regular season, during the Thanksgiving weekend. The Egg Bowl has been played on Thanksgiving 23 times, including from 1998 to 2003, in 2013, and from 2017 to 2023. The game now alternates between the two campuses. Contests in odd-numbered years are played in Starkville, at Mississippi State and even-numbered years in Oxford, at Ole Miss.

== Series history ==
The first game in the series was played on October 28, 1901, at Mississippi State. Mississippi State, defeated Ole Miss, nicknamed the Red and Blue at that time, by a final score of 17–0. The two squads met on the gridiron every year from 1901 until 1911 and then, after a three-year hiatus, resumed the series in 1915; since that 1915 meeting the two teams have met on the field every season with the exception of the 1943 season, when neither school fielded teams due to World War II.

From 1973 through 1990, the game was played at Mississippi Veterans Memorial Stadium in Jackson, which seats about 62,000. The stadium was centrally located in the state and the state's only venue capable of seating the anticipated crowds. For many years Vaught–Hemingway Stadium in Oxford seated only about 32,000 and Scott Field in Starkville seated only about 31,000. Indeed, well into the 1990s, both schools used Veterans Memorial Stadium as an alternative home venue. Both campus venues have been considerably expanded and are now capable of accommodating the expected crowds, and both have been continually upgraded to the point where they are superior in amenities to Veterans Memorial Stadium.

Mississippi State dominated the first part of the series with a 17–5–1 record against Ole Miss. Ole Miss now leads the series, in part due to its performance in the rivalry under Johnny Vaught, who went 19–2–4 against Mississippi State, and later by Billy Brewer who went 8-3. Ole Miss has a similar advantage in winning percentage in games played both in Oxford and Starkville.

=== The Golden Egg trophy ===
The Bulldogs (Mississippi State) dominated the early days of the series including a 13-game A&M winning streak from 1911 to 1925 during which time the bulldogs outscored the Red and Blue by a combined 327–33. Through 1925 Ole Miss had won only five times out of 23 total contests. In 1926 when the Red and Blue ended their 13-game losing streak by defeating A&M 7–6 in Starkville, the Ole Miss fans rushed the field with some trying to tear the goalposts down. Mississippi State fans did not take well to the Ole Miss fans destroying their property and fights broke out. Some State fans defended the goal posts with wooden chairs, and several injuries were reported. According to one account:

"Irate Aggie supporters took after the ambitious Ole Miss group with cane bottom chairs, and fights broke out. The mayhem continued until most of the chairs were splintered."

To prevent such events in the future, students of the two schools created The Golden Egg, a large trophy which has been awarded to the winning team each year since 1927. In the event of a tie, the school that won the game the previous year kept the trophy for the first half of the new year and then the trophy was sent to the other school for the second half of the new year.

The trophy is a large football-shaped brass piece mounted to a wooden base. The footballs used in American football in the 1920s were considerably more ovoid and blunter than those in use today and similar to the balls still used in rugby; the trophy thus, to modern eyes, more resembles an egg than a football.

The game was given the nickname "Egg Bowl" by The Clarion-Ledger sportswriter Tom Patterson in 1979.

== Notable games ==
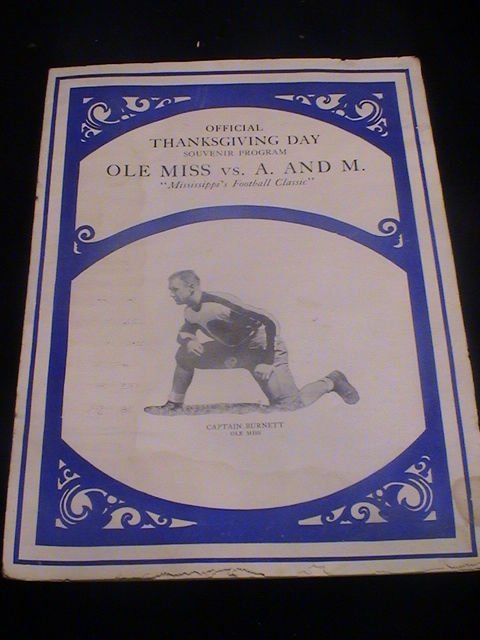
1929 Ole Miss vs. Mississippi A&M football program. The game ended tied 7–7. Note on the cover the game was referred to as "Mississippi's Football Classic" and not the "Egg Bowl", a moniker that would not be applied to the game until the 1979 contest by sportswriter Tom Patterson.

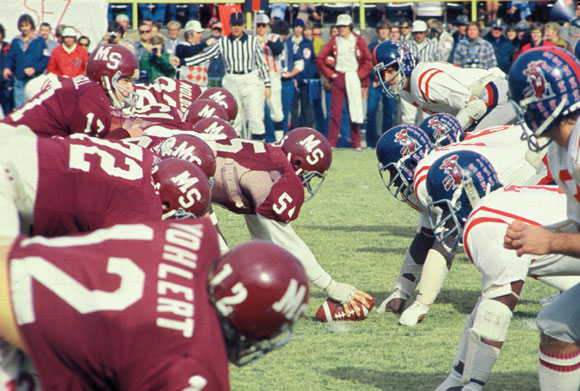
Ole Miss and Mississippi State meet in the 1975 Battle for the Golden Egg.

- 1901: The first ever meeting between the two schools was delayed for 40 minutes because of a dispute between the rivals over the eligibility of A&M's Norvin E. (Billy) Green, who had played for the Ole Miss squad the year before. Eventually it was agreed that Green would not play and the game kicked off with A&M going on to win by a score of 17–0.
- 1902: The second contest resulted in the first Ole Miss victory by a score of 21–0.
- 1903: The third meeting between the Aggies and the Red and Blue resulted in the first tie in series history and marked the first time that neither team was shut out. A&M entered the contest undefeated, untied, and unscored upon. A&M led 6–0 for most of the games, but Ole Miss tied the score with less than a minute to go when halfback Fred Elmer went 70 yards for a touchdown and Edgar Moss kicked the extra point to make it 6–6 (touchdowns were worth 5 points at the time). Those were the only points that the Aggies would surrender that season, as they went to tie Tulane in their final contest of the season by a score of 0–0.
- 1904: This marked the first time that the game was played off campus, with the two squads meeting at the Mississippi and West Alabama Fairgrounds as part of the fair. Ole Miss went on to win 17–5.
- 1905: This game featured two firsts, the first time the game was played in Jackson and the first time the game was played on Thanksgiving. The games was held at the Mississippi State Fairgrounds and because there was no barrier to stop them, the crowd poured out onto the playing field for a closer look at what, for many, was their first college game. The curious got so close that at one point, the Ole Miss captain refused to continue until the field was cleared. A&M won 11–0.
- 1906 – Passing Fancy: James C. Elmer of Ole Miss caught the first forward pass in the history of the rivalry. Elmer's kicking accounted for 13 points in a 29-5 rout. For the first time the game marked the end of the season for not one but both teams.
- 1907: Ole Miss and Mississippi A&M played a scoreless first half in extremely muddy conditions. Before the second half began, Ole Miss head coach Frank A. Mason brought out an urn filled with whisky-laced coffee in an attempt to warm his players. Sloppy second-half play resulted in a 15-0 A&M victory. After the game, many of the Ole Miss players blamed Mason for the loss. When asked if his team was returning home that night, Mason replied "Yes, the team is going north at 11 o'clock. I'm going in another direction, and hope I never see them again!" It would be his final game as head coach.
- 1908: With a 44–6 victory the Aggies became the first of the squads to claim consecutive wins in the series. A&M scored a total of eight touchdowns (only worth five points at that time) in the game.
- 1911: Earlier that week a new set of stands had been added on the east side of The Fairgrounds in Jackson. As the teams prepared for kickoff the new stands collapsed injuring at least 60 people, some seriously. Despite the disaster, the game proceeded without interruption and resulted in A&M winning 6-0. The Aggies would end the season in Havana, Cuba for their first ever postseason appearance, a 12–0 victory over the Havana Athletic Club in the Bacardi Bowl.
- 1915: After a three-year hiatus the two squads met on the gridiron in a game played in Tupelo. A&M rolled to a 65–0 victory. The contest remains the most one-sided in series history.
- 1918 – Gotcha! Twice!: This marked the only time that the two teams would square off twice in the same season. A&M won the first game in Starkville 34–0 and completed the sweep taking the second in Oxford 13–0. The Rebels were coached that season by legendary future A&M baseball coach C.R. "Dudy" Noble
- 1926 – A&M's Streak Ends: Ole Miss ended a 13-game losing streak to A&M with a 7-6 win in Starkville. The ensuing melee between fans prompted the purchase of a football-shaped trophy to be awarded to the winner each year upon their victory, and kept on their respective campus until the game was played again the following year.
- 1927 – First Game for The Trophy: In the first game after the commissioning of the Golden Egg Trophy was played on Thanksgiving Day in Oxford. Ole Miss posted back-to-back wins against A&M for the first time since 1909–10, winning 20–12.
- 1936: Mississippi State got its first win in the series since the creation of the Golden Egg ending an Ole Miss 10-game unbeaten streak (9–0–1) in the series by a final score of 26–6.
- 1947: In the first game in the series for legendary Ole Miss coach John Vaught, the Rebels won 33-14, beginning an unbeaten streak for Ole Miss that would not be broken until seventeen years later.
- 1964: The 17-year unbeaten streak (14–0–3) by Ole Miss against MSU came to an end as the Bulldogs claimed a 20–17 victory.
- 1973: In the first game between the Rebels and the Bulldogs in Jackson since 1925 and the final game of Coach Vaught's career (he returned as Ole Miss coach in an interim capacity earlier in the season), Ole Miss defeated State 38-10. This would be the largest margin of victory for Ole Miss in Jackson in the modern era to this day, and the largest ever since a 30-0 Ole Miss victory in Mississippi's capital city since 1910.
- 1976 and 1977: Mississippi State won the Egg Bowl these two years but had to forfeit the wins due to NCAA sanctions.
- 1983 – The Immaculate Deflection, or the Wind Bowl: In what has become known to Ole Miss and State fans as "The Immaculate Deflection," the 1983 Egg Bowl played in Jackson is notable because the wind helped preserve Ole Miss' 24–23 victory. Down by a point with 24 seconds left in the game, State kicked what would have been a 27-yard game-winning field goal. Bulldog freshman kicker Artie Cosby kicked it straight and long and what appeared to be over the crossbar, but as the ball reached the goal posts, a 40 mph gusting wind suspended the ball midair before it reached the uprights, after which it fell short of the goal post, securing the victory for the Rebels.
- 1986: With a 24-3 victory in a rainstorm and on a muddy field, Ole Miss defeated State four years in a row, the longest on-the-field winning streak for the Rebels since 1958-1962, a streak that stands to date.
- 1990: In what is the last game of the series to this day played in Jackson and in what would be the final game for Coach Rockey Felker of Mississippi State, the Rebels overcame a somnolent start to win 21-9. In the ten years from 1980-1989 or 1981-1990, by either decade measurement, the Rebels defeated the Bulldogs in Jackson eight out of ten times.
- 1991 – Back to Campus: In the first Egg Bowl played on either campus since 1972 and the first played at Starkville since 1971, first year head coach Jackie Sherrill led the Bulldogs to a 24–9 win, State's first over Ole Miss in Starkville since 1942, ending an 0–11–3 drought.
- 1992 – The Stand: In a defensive struggle that saw a combined 12 turnovers between the two, a goal line stand of epic proportions by the "Red Death" defense ultimately gave Ole Miss the win. State had 11 plays on consecutive possessions inside the Rebel 10 with under four minutes to play, but Ole Miss kept them out of the end zone. The first possession ended on a third down pass that was intercepted in the end zone by Michael Lowery who returned the ball out to the 2-yard line. A couple of plays later, Rebel running back Cory Philpot fumbled the ball back to the Dogs, the Rebels' 7th turnover on the day. On the ensuing possession, MSU had fourth and goal and the pass was incomplete. However, pass interference on Orlanda Truitt kept the drive alive, moving the ball to the 2. However, the next four plays resulted in negative yardage, with the final pass falling incomplete with only 20 seconds remaining. The Rebels won 17–10.
- 1997: The 1997 contest was notable for two things: first for the melee that broke out between the teams before the game kicked off and second for the dramatic way in which it ended. Trailing 14–7 with 2:12 remaining the Rebels put together a 64-yard drive that culminated with a 10-yard TD pass to WR Andre Rone. Ole Miss then elected to attempt a two-point conversion to take the lead rather than kick the extra point for the tie. Rebel QB Stewart Patridge completed a pass Cory Peterson with 25 seconds left that gave Ole Miss a 15–14 lead. A late pass by Mississippi State was intercepted by Ole Miss DB Tim Strickland to secure the win for the Rebels. Both teams finished the regular season 7-4, but only Ole Miss was invited to a bowl game, their first since 1992.
- 1998: Mississippi State clinched the SEC West division title after winning 28–6. This win sent MSU to the SEC Championship Game (the first and currently only time a Mississippi team has played for the SEC Championship) where they were defeated 24–14 by eventual national champion Tennessee. This was also Tommy Tuberville's last game as Ole Miss coach. Tuberville departed two days after this game to accept the same position at SEC West rival Auburn, with the Rebels hiring Tennessee offensive coordinator David Cutcliffe as Tuberville's replacement.
- 1999 – The Pick and the Kick: This game is best known for its dramatic ending. Down 20–6, State rallied late in the 4th to tie the game. With 20 seconds left, instead of kneeling the ball to go to overtime, the Rebels decided to run a play, deep in their own territory. Rebel quarterback Romero Miller dropped back and lobbed a deep pass which was deflected by the hands and then the foot of Mississippi State cornerback Robert Bean before being intercepted by Eugene Clinton and returned deep into Rebel territory. On the next play, with 8 seconds left, Bulldog kicker Scott Westerfield kicked a 44-yard game-winning field goal.
- 2003 – Number 100: The 2003 game marked the 100th game of the heated rivalry. Ole Miss earned a share of its first SEC West division title with Eli Manning leading the team to a dominating 31-0 win. A torrential downpour prevailed much of the game. It was the Rebels first shutout win over the Bulldogs since 1971 (48–0). This Egg Bowl marked Jackie Sherrill's final game as a football coach as in the middle of the 2003 season he had announced his retirement. Sherrill had an overall record of 7–6 against the Rebels.
- 2007 – The Comeback: MSU trailed 14–0 with less than 8 minutes left to play in the fourth quarter when Ole Miss Head Coach Ed Orgeron elected to go for a fourth down at the Ole Miss 49-yard line. Rebel running back BenJarvus Green-Ellis was stopped for a loss turning the ball over on downs. The Bulldogs drove in, scored a touchdown, seized the momentum and went on to win the game 17–14. Ole Miss fired Head Coach Ed Orgeron after the Rebels finished 0–8 in the SEC.
- 2008 – Croom's Farewell: In Houston Nutt's first Egg Bowl as the Ole Miss Head Coach, the Rebels would avenge the loss from 2007 in impressive form, utterly dominating Mississippi State in Oxford by the score of 45–0. The game featured the largest margin of defeat in any Egg Bowl game since 1971 and was the second shutout win in 5 years for Ole Miss. The game brought Ole Miss to 8–4 (5–3 in the SEC) and eventually secured them a bid to the 2009 Cotton Bowl Classic. The loss dropped MSU to 4–8 (2–6 in the SEC). MSU head coach Sylvester Croom, resigned only hours later, leaving MSU after 5 years at the helm and with a career record of 21–38.
- 2009: The Rebels, fresh off an upset win over LSU, came into Starkville with an 8–3 record and a #20 ranking, while the Bulldogs had already clinched bowl ineligibility at 4–7. However, Mississippi State's Anthony Dixon ran for 133 yards and a touchdown, backup quarterback Chris Relf ran for 131 yards a touchdown and completed two touchdown passes, and cornerback Corey Broomfield sealed the 41–27 win by returning an interception for a touchdown in the fourth quarter.
- 2012: Ole Miss QB Bo Wallace threw for 294 yards and five touchdowns—including three to Donte Moncrief—as the Rebels used a huge second half to rout No. 25 MSU 41-24 on Saturday night. It was a sweet win for Ole Miss (6-6, 3-5 Southeastern Conference), which won the Egg Bowl for the first time since 2008. Ole Miss would later vacate this win due to NCAA violations.
- 2013: MSU claimed a 17–10 overtime win over Ole Miss on a cold, Thanksgiving night at Davis Wade Stadium. It was the first Egg Bowl overtime game. Injured Bulldog quarterback Dak Prescott came off the bench with his team trailing 10–7 in the middle of the 4th quarter, leading MSU to a game-tying field goal that forced overtime. In overtime, Prescott scored a touchdown on fourth down from the three yard line. On the ensuing Ole Miss possession, Nickoe Whitley stripped the ball from Rebel quarterback Bo Wallace as he tried to score a game-tying touchdown. Mississippi State's Jamerson Love recovered the ball in the endzone to seal the victory.
- 2014: The 2014 game was of particular importance due to its implications on post-season play. MSU entered the game with a 10–1 overall record, 6–1 in conference play, and a #4 ranking in the College Football Playoff poll. A win for MSU, coupled with a loss by Alabama in the Iron Bowl, would give the Bulldogs the SEC West championship and a berth in the SEC Championship Game. Ole Miss entered the game #19, marking only the fifth time in the rivalry's history, and the first since 1999, that both teams entered the Egg Bowl ranked. For the first time since 1964, the game was televised by a national network. CBS, acknowledging the importance of the game, along with contractual limitations on how many times it can feature each team in its SEC package, passed on televising the Iron Bowl and chose to carry the Egg Bowl instead. In an upset, Ole Miss knocked off MSU 31–17. The victory was highlighted by a strong performance from Ole Miss running back Jaylen Walton who had a career-high with 148 yards rushing including a 91-yard touchdown. Ole Miss would later vacate this win due to NCAA violations.
- 2015: #18 Ole Miss raced to a 21–0 first quarter lead and never looked back in a decisive 38–27 win over #21 MSU at Davis Wade Stadium. The Rebels finished 10–3 (6–2 in the SEC) after Sugar Bowl win over Oklahoma State. The Bulldogs regrouped after the Egg Bowl to beat NC State in the Belk Bowl and finished the year 9–4 (4–4 in the SEC).
- 2016: Ole Miss and Mississippi State entered the game tied with 2-5 conference records. A home win for Ole Miss would have clinched bowl eligibility for the Rebels whereas a win for MSU would have given a 5-7 Bulldogs a chance to play in a bowl game due to the school's Academic Progress Rate (and lack of bowl eligible teams). In a mild upset, the Bulldogs won 55-20 thanks largely to the performance of sophomore quarterback Nick Fitzgerald who rushed for a school-record 258 yards. The 35-point spread was the largest ever for the Bulldogs in Oxford.
- 2017: Following a dislocated ankle injury for Bulldog quarterback Nick Fitzgerald early in the first quarter, the unranked Rebels built a 24–6 third quarter lead over the Bulldogs in Starkville. Despite five MSU turnovers, true freshman quarterback Keytaon Thompson would lead the Bulldogs to a unanswered 15-point rally in the fourth quarter to finish the game as a 31–28 loss for MSU.
- 2018 – The Egg Brawl: This game was notable for a brawl that occurred at the end of the third quarter. Ole Miss, trailing 28–3, appeared to score a touchdown to end the quarter. One of the MSU players continued fighting for the ball long after Ole Miss wide receiver A.J. Brown crossed the goal line with the ball. Players then started to shove each other, and eventually punches were exchanged and the benches cleared. Four players, one for Ole Miss (C.J. Moore) and three for MSU (Cameron Dantzler, Jamal Peters, Willie Gay Jr.), were ejected, and every player on both teams was given an unsportsmanlike conduct penalty. Gay was ejected because of an unsportsmanlike conduct penalty he had received earlier in the game. The touchdown that Brown had appeared to score was then taken off the board due to the game clock expiring before the snap. The Bulldogs won 35–3, but would later vacate the victory due to NCAA violations.
- 2019 - The Piss and the Miss: After Elijah Moore caught a touchdown with 0:04 left in the 4th quarter to cut the lead to 21–20, he performed a touchdown celebration mimicking a dog urinating in the end zone. The ensuing 15-yard unsportsmanlike conduct penalty was enforced on the extra point attempt, which kicker Luke Logan missed. The miss kept the game at 21–20, allowing the Bulldogs to run off the remaining seconds for the victory. Ole Miss fired head coach Matt Luke after the game.
- 2022 - Leach's Last Win: Ole Miss quarterback Jaxson Dart threw a late touchdown with 1:25 left, capping a 99-yard drive. However, the Bulldogs stopped the following two-point conversion to seal a 24-22 victory. This game would end up being the final game coached by MSU's Mike Leach before his unexpected death.
- 2023 - Road to 11 Wins: Ole Miss quarterback Jaxson Dart threw a 26-yard touchdown pass to Caden Prieskorn early in the fourth quarter to give the Rebels (10-2, 6-2 SEC, No. 12 CFP) a 10-point lead. The win pushed the Rebels closer to an 11 win season for the first time in school history. They would complete the task by capping off the season with a 38-25 victory over No. 10 Penn State in the Chick-fil-A Peach Bowl inside Mercedes-Benz Stadium.
- 2025 - The Lane Train's Final Destination: Ole Miss entered the Egg Bowl against their rival Mississippi State with a record of 10–1 (6–1 SEC) and was ranked #7 in the country. Mississippi State was 5–6 (1–6 SEC) and needed one more win to reach bowl eligibility. Ole Miss quarterback Trinidad Chambliss threw for 359 yards and 4 touchdowns and the Rebels won 38–19. However, this would ultimately be the final game coached by Lane Kiffin at Ole Miss, as two days later, he announced he would be departing the program to accept the head coaching position at Ole Miss' other rival LSU; Ole Miss Athletic Director Keith Carter announced that Kiffin would not be allowed to coach the Rebels in the College Football Playoff because of his intentions to depart for LSU. With Pete Golding as the new head coach, Ole Miss would earn a No. 6 seed in the CFP and ultimately defeated Tulane and Georgia before falling to Miami in the national semifinals and finishing the season with a record of 13-2.

== Game results ==
Mississippi State victories	Ole Miss victories	Tie games

No.	Date	Location	Winning team		Losing team	
1	October 28, 1901	Starkville	Mississippi A&M	17	Ole Miss	0
2	October 25, 1902	Starkville	Ole Miss	21	Mississippi A&M	0
3	November 14, 1903	Oxford	Tie	6	Tie	6
4	October 22, 1904	Columbus	Ole Miss	17	Mississippi A&M	5
5	November 30, 1905	Jackson	Mississippi A&M	11	Ole Miss	0
6	November 29, 1906	Jackson	Ole Miss	29	Mississippi A&MM	5
7	November 28, 1907	Jackson	Mississippi A&M	15	Ole Miss	0
8	November 26, 1908	Jackson	Mississippi A&M	44	Ole Miss	6
9	November 25, 1909	Jackson	Ole Miss	9	Mississippi A&M	5
10	November 24, 1910	Jackson	Ole Miss	30	Mississippi A&M	0
11	November 30, 1911	Jackson	Mississippi A&M	6	Ole Miss	0
12	November 6, 1915	Tupelo	Mississippi A&M	65	Ole Miss	0
13	November 3, 1916	Tupelo	Mississippi A&M	36	Ole Miss	0
14	November 3, 1917	Tupelo	Mississippi A&M	41	Ole Miss	14
15	November 28, 1918	Starkville	Mississippi A&M	34	Ole Miss	0
16	December 7, 1918	Oxford	Mississippi A&M	13	Ole Miss	0
17	November 8, 1919	Clarksdale	Mississippi A&M	33	Ole Miss	0
18	November 6, 1920	Greenwood	Mississippi A&M	20	Ole Miss	0
19	October 29, 1921	Greenwood	Mississippi A&M	21	Ole Miss	0
20	October 21, 1922	Jackson	Mississippi A&M	19	Ole Miss	13
21	October 20, 1923	Jackson	Mississippi A&M	13	Ole Miss	6
22	October 18, 1924	Jackson	Mississippi A&M	20	Ole Miss	0
23	October 24, 1925	Jackson	Mississippi A&M	6	Ole Miss	0
24	November 25, 1926	Starkville	Ole Miss	7	Mississippi A&M	6
25	November 24, 1927	Oxford	Ole Miss	20	Mississippi A&M	12
26	November 29, 1928	Starkville	Ole Miss	20	Mississippi A&M	19
27	November 28, 1929	Oxford	Tie	7	Tie	7
28	November 27, 1930	Starkville	Ole Miss	20	Mississippi A&M	0
29	November 26, 1931	Oxford	Ole Miss	25	Mississippi A&M	14
30	November 24, 1932	Starkville	Ole Miss	13	Mississippi State	0
31	December 2, 1933	Oxford	Ole Miss	31	Mississippi State	0
32	December 1, 1934	Starkville	Ole Miss	7	Mississippi State	3
33	November 30, 1935	Oxford	Ole Miss	14	Mississippi State	6
34	November 21, 1936	Starkville	Mississippi State	26	Ole Miss	6
35	November 25, 1937	Oxford	Mississippi State	9	Ole Miss	7
36	November 26, 1938	Starkville	Ole Miss	19	Miss. State	6
37	November 25, 1939	Oxford	Mississippi State	18	Ole Miss	6
38	November 23, 1940	Starkville	#16 Mississippi State	19	#11 Ole Miss	0
39	November 29, 1941	Oxford	Mississippi State	6	#14 Ole Miss	0
40	November 21, 1942	Starkville	#16 Mississippi State	34	Ole Miss	12
41	November 25, 1944	Oxford	Ole Miss	13	Mississippi State	8
42	November 24, 1945	Starkville	Ole Miss	7	#20 Mississippi State	6
43	November 23, 1946	Oxford	Mississippi State	20	Ole Miss	0
44	November 29, 1947	Starkville	#15 Ole Miss	33	Mississippi State	14
45	November 27, 1948	Oxford	#17 Ole Miss	34	Mississippi State	7
46	November 26, 1949	Starkville	Ole Miss	26	Mississippi State	0
47	December 2, 1950	Oxford	Ole Miss	27	Mississippi State	20
48	December 1, 1951	Starkville	Ole Miss	49	Mississippi State	7
49	November 29, 1952	Oxford	#6 Ole Miss	20	Mississippi State	14
50	November 28, 1953	Starkville	Tie	7	Tie	7
51	November 27, 1954	Oxford	#6 Ole Miss	14	Mississippi State	0
52	November 26, 1955	Starkville	#14 Ole Miss	26	Mississippi State	0
53	December 1, 1956	Oxford	Ole Miss	13	Mississippi State	7
54	November 30, 1957	Starkville	Tie	7	Tie	7
55	November 29, 1958	Oxford	#13 Ole Miss	21	Mississippi State	0
56	November 28, 1959	Starkville	#2 Ole Miss	42	Mississippi State	0
57	November 26, 1960	Oxford	#3 Ole Miss	35	Mississippi State	9
58	December 2, 1961	Starkville	#5 Ole Miss	37	Mississippi State	7
59	December 1, 1962	Oxford	#3 Ole Miss	13	Miss. State	6
60	November 30, 1963	Starkville	Tie	10	Tie	10
61	December 5, 1964	Oxford	Mississippi State	20	Ole Miss	17
62	November 27, 1965	Starkville	Ole Miss	21	Mississippi State	0

No.	Date	Location	Winning team		Losing team	
63	November 26, 1966	Oxford	Ole Miss	24	Mississippi State	0
64	December 2, 1967	Starkville	Ole Miss	10	Mississippi State	3
65	November 30, 1968	Oxford	Tie	17	Tie	17
66	November 27, 1969	Starkville	#14 Ole Miss	48	Mississippi State	22
67	November 26, 1970	Oxford	Mississippi State	19	#10 Ole Miss	14
68	November 25, 1971	Starkville	#18 Ole Miss	48	Mississippi State	0
69	November 25, 1972	Oxford	Ole Miss	51	Mississippi State	14
70	November 24, 1973	Jackson	Ole Miss	38	Mississippi State	10
71	November 23, 1974	Jackson	Mississippi State	31	Ole Miss	13
72	November 22, 1975	Jackson	Ole Miss	13	Mississippi State	7
73	November 20, 1976	Jackson	Ole Miss	11	Mississippi State	28†
74	November 19, 1977	Jackson	Ole Miss	14	Mississippi State	18†
75	November 25, 1978	Jackson	Ole Miss	27	Mississippi State	7
76	November 24, 1979	Jackson	Ole Miss	14	Mississippi State	9
77	November 22, 1980	Jackson	#17 Mississippi State	19	Ole Miss	14
78	November 21, 1981	Jackson	Ole Miss	21	Mississippi State	17
79	November 20, 1982	Jackson	Mississippi State	27	Ole Miss	10
80	November 19, 1983	Jackson	Ole Miss	24	Mississippi State	23
81	November 24, 1984	Jackson	Ole Miss	24	Mississippi State	3
82	November 23, 1985	Jackson	Ole Miss	45	Mississippi State	27
83	November 22, 1986	Jackson	Ole Miss	24	Mississippi State	3
84	November 21, 1987	Jackson	Mississippi State	30	Ole Miss	20
85	November 26, 1988	Jackson	Ole Miss	33	Mississippi State	6
86	November 25, 1989	Jackson	Ole Miss	21	Mississippi State	11
87	November 24, 1990	Jackson	#21 Ole Miss	21	Mississippi State	9
88	November 23, 1991	Starkville	Mississippi State	24	Ole Miss	9
89	November 28, 1992	Oxford	#24 Ole Miss	17	#18 Mississippi State	10
90	November 27, 1993	Starkville	Mississippi State	20	Ole Miss	13
91	November 26, 1994	Oxford	#19 Mississippi State	21	Ole Miss	17
92	November 25, 1995	Starkville	Ole Miss	13	Mississippi State	10
93	November 30, 1996	Oxford	Mississippi State	17	Ole Miss	0
94	November 29, 1997	Starkville	Ole Miss	15	#22 Mississippi State	14
95	November 26, 1998	Oxford	#25 Mississippi State	28	Ole Miss	6
96	November 25, 1999	Starkville	#18 Mississippi State	23	#23 Ole Miss	20
97	November 23, 2000	Oxford	Ole Miss	45	#23 Mississippi State	30
98	November 22, 2001	Starkville	Mississippi State	36	Ole Miss	28
99	November 28, 2002	Oxford	Ole Miss	24	Mississippi State	12
100	November 27, 2003	Starkville	#17 Ole Miss	31	Mississippi State	0
101	November 27, 2004	Oxford	Ole Miss	20	Mississippi State	3
102	November 26, 2005	Starkville	Mississippi State	35	Ole Miss	14
103	November 25, 2006	Oxford	Ole Miss	20	Mississippi State	17
104	November 23, 2007	Starkville	Mississippi State	17	Ole Miss	14
105	November 28, 2008	Oxford	#25 Ole Miss	45	Mississippi State	0
106	November 28, 2009	Starkville	Mississippi State	41	#20 Ole Miss	27
107	November 27, 2010	Oxford	#25 Mississippi State	31	Ole Miss	23
108	November 26, 2011	Starkville	Mississippi State	31	Ole Miss	3
109	November 24, 2012	Oxford	Ole Miss‡	41	#25 Mississippi State	24
110	November 28, 2013	Starkville	Mississippi State	17	Ole Miss	10^{OT}
111	November 29, 2014	Oxford	#18 Ole Miss‡	31	#4 Mississippi State	17
112	November 28, 2015	Starkville	#19 Ole Miss	38	#23 Mississippi State	27
113	November 26, 2016	Oxford	Mississippi State	55	Ole Miss	20
114	November 23, 2017	Starkville	Ole Miss	31	#16 Mississippi State	28
115	November 22, 2018	Oxford	#22 Mississippi State^	35	Ole Miss	3
116	November 28, 2019	Starkville	Mississippi State	21	Ole Miss	20
117	November 28, 2020	Oxford	Ole Miss	31	Mississippi State	24
118	November 25, 2021	Starkville	#9 Ole Miss	31	Mississippi State	21
119	November 24, 2022	Oxford	Mississippi State	24	#20 Ole Miss	22
120	November 23, 2023	Starkville	#12 Ole Miss	17	Mississippi State	7
121	November 29, 2024	Oxford	#14 Ole Miss	26	Mississippi State	14
122	November 28, 2025	Starkville	#7 Ole Miss	38	Mississippi State	19
Series: Ole Miss leads 67–46–6
† Mississippi State forfeit ‡ Ole Miss vacated^ Mississippi State vacated

=== Results by location ===
As of November 28, 2025

Location	Games	Ole Miss victories	Mississippi State victories	Ties	Years played
Starkville	44	26	15	3	1901–02, 1918, 1926–71, 1991–present
Oxford	42	23	13	3	1903, 1918, 1927–72, 1992–present
Jackson	29	17	12	0	1905–11, 1922–25, 1973–90
Tupelo	3	0	3	0	1915–17
Greenwood	2	0	2	0	1920–21
Clarksdale	1	0	1	0	1919
Columbus	1	1	0	0	1904

== See also ==
- Mississippi State–Ole Miss baseball rivalry
- List of NCAA college football rivalry games
- List of most-played college football series in NCAA Division I
