= 1968 Utah Utes football team =

American college football season

1968 Utah Utes football
- Conference: Western Athletic Conference
- Record: 3–7 (2–3 WAC)
- Head coach: Bill Meek (1st season)
- Defensive coordinator: Jim LaRue (1st season)
- Home stadium: Ute Stadium

1968 Western Athletic Conference football standings
	Conf.					Overall
Team	W		L		T	W		L		T
Wyoming $	6	–	1	–	0	7	–	3	–	0
Arizona State	5	–	1	–	0	8	–	2	–	0
Arizona	5	–	1	–	0	8	–	3	–	0
UTEP	3	–	3	–	0	4	–	5	–	1
Utah	2	–	3	–	0	3	–	7	–	0
Colorado State	1	–	4	–	0	2	–	8	–	0
BYU	1	–	5	–	0	2	–	8	–	0
New Mexico	0	–	7	–	0	0	–	10	–	0
$ – Conference champion; Colorado State's games against Texas Tech and Air Force counted in the conference standings.

The 1968 Utah Utes football team, or also commonly known as the Utah Redskins, was an American football team that represented the University of Utah as a member of the Western Athletic Conference (WAC) during the 1968 NCAA University Division football season. In their first season under head coach Bill Meek, the Utes compiled an overall record of 3–7 with a mark of 2–3 against conference opponents, placing fifth in the WAC. Home games were played on campus at Ute Stadium in Salt Lake City.

== Schedule ==
Date	Time	Opponent	Site	Result	Attendance	Source
September 21		at No. 14 Nebraska*	Memorial Stadium; Lincoln, NE	L 0–31	66,198	
September 28		No. 18 Oregon State*	Ute Stadium; Salt Lake City, UT	L 21–28	19,265	
October 5	2:30 p.m.	at Washington State*	Rogers Field; Pullman, WA	W 17–14	16,503	
October 12		New Mexico	Ute Stadium; Salt Lake City, UT	W 30–7	22,239	
October 19		at Wyoming	War Memorial Stadium; Laramie, WY	L 9–20	15,626	
October 26		at Oregon*	Autzen Stadium; Eugene, OR	L 6–14	17,000	
November 2		BYU^{†}	Ute Stadium; Salt Lake City, UT (rivalry)	W 30–21	28,677	
November 9		at Arizona State	Sun Devil Stadium; Tempe, AZ	L 21–59	39,713	
November 16		Arizona	Ute Stadium; Salt Lake City, UT	L 15–16	16,544	
November 23		at Utah State*	Romney Stadium; Logan, UT (rivalry)	L 13–28	17,660	
*Non-conference game; ^{†}Homecoming; Rankings from AP Poll released prior to the game; All times are in Mountain time

== Roster ==
1968 Utah Utes football team roster
Players
Coaches
Offense

Pos.	#	Name	Class
QB	15	Tim Collins	Jr
QB	12	Ray Groth	Jr
G	73	Gordon Jolley	So
TE	80	Dale Nosworthy	So
RB	42	Dave Smith	Jr
WR	84	Louis Thomas	Sr

Defense

Pos.	#	Name	Class
DE	78	Norm McBride	Sr

Special teams

Pos.	#	Name	Class

Head coach

- Bill Meek

Coordinators/assistant coaches

Legend

- (C) Team captain
- (S) Suspended
- (I) Ineligible
- Injured
- Redshirt

== NFL/AFL draft ==
Three Utah players were selected in the 1969 NFL/AFL draft.

Player	Position	Round	Pick	NFL team
Louis Thomas	Wide receiver	3	57	Cincinnati Bengals
Norman McBride	Linebacker	4	89	Miami Dolphins
Gary Kerl	Linebacker	11	279	St. Louis Cardinals
