= 1968 Wyoming Cowboys football team =

American college football season

1968 Wyoming Cowboys football

WAC champion
- Conference: Western Athletic Conference
- Record: 7–3 (6–1 WAC)
- Head coach: Lloyd Eaton (7th season)
- Captains: Jim House; Gene Huey
- Home stadium: War Memorial Stadium

1968 Western Athletic Conference football standings
	Conf.					Overall
Team	W		L		T	W		L		T
Wyoming $	6	–	1	–	0	7	–	3	–	0
Arizona State	5	–	1	–	0	8	–	2	–	0
Arizona	5	–	1	–	0	8	–	3	–	0
UTEP	3	–	3	–	0	4	–	5	–	1
Utah	2	–	3	–	0	3	–	7	–	0
Colorado State	1	–	4	–	0	2	–	8	–	0
BYU	1	–	5	–	0	2	–	8	–	0
New Mexico	0	–	7	–	0	0	–	10	–	0
$ – Conference champion; Colorado State's games against Texas Tech and Air Force counted in the conference standings.

The 1968 Wyoming Cowboys football team represented the University of Wyoming in the 1968 NCAA University Division football season. Led by seventh-year head coach Lloyd Eaton, they were members of the Western Athletic Conference (WAC) and played their home games on campus at War Memorial Stadium in Laramie.

The Cowboys had a record of 7–3 (6-1 against WAC opponents), won a third consecutive WAC title, and outscored their opponents 242 to 118.

== Schedule ==
Date	Opponent	Rank	Site	Result	Attendance	Source
September 14	at No. 14 Nebraska*		Memorial Stadium; Lincoln, NE	L 10–13	66,922	
September 21	Utah State*		War Memorial Stadium; Laramie, WY (rivalry)	W 48–3	20,719	
September 28	at Air Force*	No. 20	Falcon Stadium; Colorado Springs, CO	L 3–10	29,920	
October 5	No. 14 Arizona State		War Memorial Stadium; Laramie, WY	W 27–13	19,408	
October 12	at BYU		Cougar Stadium; Provo, UT	W 20–17	26,468	
October 19	Utah		War Memorial Stadium; Laramie, WY	W 20–9	15,626	
October 26	New Mexico		War Memorial Stadium; Laramie, WY	W 35–6	19,169	
November 2	at Colorado State		Hughes Stadium; Fort Collins, CO (rivalry)	W 46–14	22,500	
November 16	at UTEP	No. 20	Sun Bowl; El Paso, TX	W 26–19	25,874	
November 23	at Arizona	No. 20	Arizona Stadium; Tucson, AZ	L 7–14	40,500	
*Non-conference game; Rankings from AP Poll released prior to the game

== Roster ==
1968 Wyoming Cowboys football team roster
Players
Coaches
Offense

Pos.	#	Name	Class
RB	22	Dave Hampton	Sr
QB	12	Skip Jacobson	Sr
QB	10	Ed Synakowski	So
RB	26	Joe Williams	Jr

Defense

Pos.	#	Name	Class
DE	88	Tony McGee	So
LB	53	Gene Sheahan	So

Special teams

Pos.	#	Name	Class

Head coach

- Lloyd Eaton

Coordinators/assistant coaches

Legend

- (C) Team captain
- (S) Suspended
- (I) Ineligible
- Injured
- Redshirt

== 1969 NFL/AFL Draft ==
Three Cowboys were selected in the 1969 NFL/AFL draft, the third common draft, which lasted seventeen rounds (442 selections).

Player	Position	Round	Overall	NFL team
Gene Huey	Wide receiver	5	123	St. Louis Cardinals
Dave Hampton	Running back	9	220	Green Bay Packers
Dennis Devlin	Defensive back	10	240	New England Patriots
