= 1968 BYU Cougars football team =

American college football season

1968 BYU Cougars football
- Conference: Western Athletic Conference
- Record: 2–8 (1–5 WAC)
- Head coach: Tommy Hudspeth (5th season)
- Home stadium: Cougar Stadium

1968 Western Athletic Conference football standings
	Conf.					Overall
Team	W		L		T	W		L		T
Wyoming $	6	–	1	–	0	7	–	3	–	0
Arizona State	5	–	1	–	0	8	–	2	–	0
Arizona	5	–	1	–	0	8	–	3	–	0
UTEP	3	–	3	–	0	4	–	5	–	1
Utah	2	–	3	–	0	3	–	7	–	0
Colorado State	1	–	4	–	0	2	–	8	–	0
BYU	1	–	5	–	0	2	–	8	–	0
New Mexico	0	–	7	–	0	0	–	10	–	0
$ – Conference champion; Colorado State's games against Texas Tech and Air Force counted in the conference standings.

The 1968 BYU Cougars football team was an American football team that represented Brigham Young University (BYU) as a member of the Western Athletic Conference (WAC) during the 1968 NCAA University Division football season. In their fifth season under head coach Tommy Hudspeth, the Cougars compiled an overall record of 2–8 with a mark of 1–5 against conference opponents, finished seventh in the WAC, and were outscored by a total of 247 to 179.

== Schedule ==
Date	Opponent	Site	Result	Attendance	Source
September 21	at Western Michigan*	Waldo Stadium; Kalamazoo, MI	W 17–7	12,300–26,571	
September 28	Iowa State*	Cougar Stadium; Provo, UT	L 20–28	24,959	
October 12	Wyoming	Cougar Stadium; Provo, UT	L 17–20	26,468	
October 19	at Arizona	Arizona Stadium; Tucson, AZ	L 3–19	37,650	
October 26	UTEP^{†}	Cougar Stadium; Provo, UT	L 25–31	27,010	
November 2	at Utah	Ute Stadium; Salt Lake City, UT (rivalry)	L 21–30	28,677	
November 9	Utah State*	Cougar Stadium; Provo, UT (rivalry)	L 8–34	20,740	
November 16	Arizona State	Sun Devil Stadium; Tempe, AZ	L 12–47	13,026	
November 23	at New Mexico	University Stadium; Albuquerque, NM	W 35–6	6,950	
November 30	at San Jose State*	Spartan Stadium; San Jose, CA	L 21–25	2,875	
*Non-conference game; ^{†}Homecoming

== Roster ==
1968 BYU Cougars football team roster
Players
Coaches
Offense

Pos.	#	Name	Class

Defense

Pos.	#	Name	Class
LB	36	Steve Densley	Jr
DB	19	Chris Farasopoulos	So

Special teams

Pos.	#	Name	Class

Head coach

- Tommy Hudspeth

Coordinators/assistant coaches

Legend

- (C) Team captain
- (S) Suspended
- (I) Ineligible
- Injured
- Redshirt

Roster
