= 1968 New Mexico Lobos football team =

American college football season

1968 New Mexico Lobos football
- Conference: Western Athletic Conference
- Record: 0–10 (0–7 WAC)
- Head coach: Rudy Feldman (1st season)
- Home stadium: University Stadium

1968 Western Athletic Conference football standings
| | Conf. | | | | | Overall |
| Team | W | | L | | T | W | | L | | T |
|---|---|---|---|---|---|---|---|---|---|---|
| Wyoming $ | 6 | – | 1 | – | 0 | 7 | – | 3 | – | 0 |
| Arizona State | 5 | – | 1 | – | 0 | 8 | – | 2 | – | 0 |
| Arizona | 5 | – | 1 | – | 0 | 8 | – | 3 | – | 0 |
| UTEP | 3 | – | 3 | – | 0 | 4 | – | 5 | – | 1 |
| Utah | 2 | – | 3 | – | 0 | 3 | – | 7 | – | 0 |
| Colorado State | 1 | – | 4 | – | 0 | 2 | – | 8 | – | 0 |
| BYU | 1 | – | 5 | – | 0 | 2 | – | 8 | – | 0 |
| New Mexico | 0 | – | 7 | – | 0 | 0 | – | 10 | – | 0 |
$ – Conference champion; Colorado State's games against Texas Tech and Air Force counted in the conference standings.

The 1968 New Mexico Lobos football team was an American football team that represented the University of New Mexico in the Western Athletic Conference (WAC) during the 1968 NCAA University Division football season. In their first season under head coach Rudy Feldman, the Lobos compiled a 0–10 record (0–7 against WAC opponents) and were outscored, 403 to 120.

David Harris, Ace Hendricks, and John Pautsch were the team captains. The team's statistical leaders included Terry Stone with 769 passing yards, David Bookert with 872 rushing yards and 60 points scored, and Bob Fowler with 265 receiving yards.

== Schedule ==
| Date | Opponent | Site | Result | Attendance | Source |
|---|---|---|---|---|---|
| September 14 | Colorado State | University Stadium; Albuquerque, NM | L 13–21 | 16,992 | |
| September 21 | at UTEP | Sun Bowl; El Paso, TX | L 15–44 | 25,220 | |
| September 28 | Arizona | University Stadium; Albuquerque, NM (rivalry) | L 8–19 | 13,749 | |
| October 5 | at No. 8 Kansas* | Memorial Stadium; Lawrence, KS | L 7–68 | 21,000 | |
| October 12 | at Utah | Ute Stadium; Salt Lake City, UT | L 7–30 | 22,239 | |
| October 19 | San Jose State*^{†} | University Stadium; Albuquerque, NM | L 24–55 | 12,089 | |
| October 26 | at Wyoming | War Memorial Stadium; Laramie, WY | L 6–35 | 19,169 | |
| November 2 | at Arizona State | Sun Devil Stadium; Tempe, AZ | L 28–63 | 26,342 | |
| November 16 | New Mexico State* | University Stadium; Albuquerque, NM (rivalry) | L 6–33 | 8,800 | |
| November 23 | BYU | University Stadium; Albuquerque, NM | L 6–35 | 6,950 | |
*Non-conference game; ^{†}Homecoming; Rankings from AP Poll released prior to the game

== Roster ==
1968 New Mexico Lobos football team roster
| Players | | | Coaches |
|---|---|---|---|
| Offense: Pos. / # / Name / Class; RB / 23 / Sam Scarber / So | Defense: Pos. / # / Name / Class | Special teams: Pos. / # / Name / Class | Head coach: Rudy Feldman; Coordinators/assistant coaches Legend: (C) Team captain; (S) Suspended; (I) Ineligible; Injured; Redshirt |
