= 1968 Arizona State Sun Devils football team =

American college football season

1968 Arizona State Sun Devils football
- Conference: Western Athletic Conference
- Record: 8–2 (5–1 WAC)
- Head coach: Frank Kush (11th season)
- Home stadium: Sun Devil Stadium

1968 Western Athletic Conference football standings
	Conf.					Overall
Team	W		L		T	W		L		T
Wyoming $	6	–	1	–	0	7	–	3	–	0
Arizona State	5	–	1	–	0	8	–	2	–	0
Arizona	5	–	1	–	0	8	–	3	–	0
UTEP	3	–	3	–	0	4	–	5	–	1
Utah	2	–	3	–	0	3	–	7	–	0
Colorado State	1	–	4	–	0	2	–	8	–	0
BYU	1	–	5	–	0	2	–	8	–	0
New Mexico	0	–	7	–	0	0	–	10	–	0
$ – Conference champion; Colorado State's games against Texas Tech and Air Force counted in the conference standings.

The 1968 Arizona State Sun Devils football team was an American football team that represented Arizona State University in the Western Athletic Conference (WAC) during the 1968 NCAA University Division football season. In their 11th season under head coach Frank Kush, the Sun Devils compiled an 8–2 record (5–1 against WAC opponents), finished in a tie for second place in the WAC, and outscored their opponents by a combined total of 414 to 163.

The team's statistical leaders included Joe Spagnola with 917 passing yards, Art Malone with 1,431 rushing yards, and Fair Hooker with 665 receiving yards.

== Schedule ==
Date	Opponent	Rank	Site	Result	Attendance	Source
September 21	Wisconsin*		Sun Devil Stadium; Tempe, AZ	W 55–7	43,317	
September 28	UTEP	No. 19	Sun Devil Stadium; Tempe, AZ	W 31–19	42,073	
October 5	at Wyoming	No. 14	War Memorial Stadium; Laramie, WY	L 13–27	19,408	
October 12	Washington State*		Sun Devil Stadium; Tempe, AZ	W 41–14	36,226	
October 19	at Oregon State*		Civic Stadium; Portland, OR	L 9–28	27,507	
November 2	New Mexico		Sun Devil Stadium; Tempe, AZ	W 63–28	26,342	
November 9	Utah		Sun Devil Stadium; Tempe, AZ	W 59–21	39,713	
November 16	at BYU		Cougar Stadium; Provo, UT	W 47–12	13,026	
November 23	San Jose State*		Sun Devil Stadium; Tempe, AZ	W 66–0	23,168	
November 30	at No. 19 Arizona	No. 20	Arizona Stadium; Tucson, AZ (rivalry)	W 30–7	41,350	
*Non-conference game; Rankings from AP Poll released prior to the game
