= 1968 UTEP Miners football team =

American college football season

1968 UTEP Miners football
- Conference: Western Athletic Conference
- Record: 4–5–1 (3–3 WAC)
- Head coach: Bobby Dobbs (4th season)
- Home stadium: Sun Bowl

1968 Western Athletic Conference football standings
	Conf.					Overall
Team	W		L		T	W		L		T
Wyoming $	6	–	1	–	0	7	–	3	–	0
Arizona State	5	–	1	–	0	8	–	2	–	0
Arizona	5	–	1	–	0	8	–	3	–	0
UTEP	3	–	3	–	0	4	–	5	–	1
Utah	2	–	3	–	0	3	–	7	–	0
Colorado State	1	–	4	–	0	2	–	8	–	0
BYU	1	–	5	–	0	2	–	8	–	0
New Mexico	0	–	7	–	0	0	–	10	–	0
$ – Conference champion; Colorado State's games against Texas Tech and Air Force counted in the conference standings.

The 1968 UTEP Miners football team was an American football team that represented the University of Texas at El Paso as a member of the Western Athletic Conference (WAC) during the 1968 NCAA University Division football season. In its fourth season under head coach Bobby Dobbs, the team compiled a 4–5–1 record (3–3 against WAC opponents), finished fourth in the conference, and outscored opponents by a total of 232 to 225.

== Schedule ==
Date	Opponent	Site	Result	Attendance	Source
September 14	UC Santa Barbara*	Sun Bowl; El Paso, TX	T 14–14	26,820	
September 21	New Mexico	Sun Bowl; El Paso, TX	W 44–15	25,220	
September 28	at No. 19 Arizona State	Sun Devil Stadium; Tempe, AZ	L 19–31	42,073	
October 5	at Arizona	Arizona Stadium; Tucson, AZ	L 0–25	37,300	
October 12	Long Beach State*	Sun Bowl; El Paso, TX	L 21–22	21,120	
October 19	New Mexico State	Sun Bowl; El Paso, TX (rivalry)	W 30–14	25,320	
October 26	at BYU	Cougar Stadium; Provo, UT	W 31–25	27,010	
November 9	North Texas State*	Sun Bowl; El Paso, TX	L 31–34	20,160	
November 16	No. 20 Wyoming^{†}	Sun Bowl; El Paso, TX	L 19–26	25,874	
November 23	Colorado State	Sun Bowl; El Paso, TX	W 23–19	13,125	
*Non-conference game; ^{†}Homecoming; Rankings from Coaches' Poll released prior to the game
