= 1968 Arizona Wildcats football team =

American college football season

1968 Arizona Wildcats football

Sun Bowl, L 10–34 vs. Auburn
- Conference: Western Athletic Conference
- Record: 8–3 (5–1 WAC)
- Head coach: Darrell Mudra (2nd season)
- Home stadium: Arizona Stadium

1968 Western Athletic Conference football standings
	Conf.					Overall
Team	W		L		T	W		L		T
Wyoming $	6	–	1	–	0	7	–	3	–	0
Arizona State	5	–	1	–	0	8	–	2	–	0
Arizona	5	–	1	–	0	8	–	3	–	0
UTEP	3	–	3	–	0	4	–	5	–	1
Utah	2	–	3	–	0	3	–	7	–	0
Colorado State	1	–	4	–	0	2	–	8	–	0
BYU	1	–	5	–	0	2	–	8	–	0
New Mexico	0	–	7	–	0	0	–	10	–	0
$ – Conference champion; Colorado State's games against Texas Tech and Air Force counted in the conference standings.

The 1968 Arizona Wildcats football team represented the University of Arizona in the Western Athletic Conference (WAC) during the 1968 NCAA University Division football season. In their second and final season under head coach Darrell Mudra, the Wildcats compiled an 8–3 record (5–1 against WAC opponents), finished in a tie for second place in the WAC, lost to Auburn in the Sun Bowl, and outscored their opponents, 186 to 149. The team played its home games in Arizona Stadium in Tucson, Arizona.

The team's statistical leaders included Mark Driscoll with 927 passing yards, Noki Fulmaono with 579 rushing yards, and Ron Gardin with 892 receiving yards.

Mudra stepped down as Arizona coach at the end of the season to accept the head coaching position at Western Illinois, and the Wildcats had to find a new coach for the 1969 season.

== Schedule ==
Date	Opponent	Rank	Site	Result	Attendance	Source
September 21	at Iowa State*		Clyde Williams Field; Ames, IA	W 21–12	20,908	
September 28	at New Mexico		University Stadium; Albuquerque, NM (rivalry)	W 19–8	13,749	
October 5	UTEP		Arizona Stadium; Tucson, AZ	W 25–0	37,300	
October 19	BYU		Arizona Stadium; Tucson, AZ	W 19–3	37,650	
October 26	at Indiana*		Seventeenth Street Stadium; Bloomington, IN	L 13–16	44,847	
November 2	Washington State*		Arizona Stadium; Tucson, AZ	W 28–14	31,400	
November 9	at Air Force*		Falcon Stadium; Colorado Springs, CO	W 14–10	32,196	
November 16	at Utah		Ute Stadium; Salt Lake City, UT	W 16–15	16,544	
November 23	No. 20 Wyoming		Arizona Stadium; Tucson, AZ	W 14–7	40,500	
November 30	No. 20 Arizona State	No. 19	Arizona Stadium; Tucson, AZ (rivalry)	L 7–30	41,350	
December 28	vs. Auburn*		Sun Bowl; El Paso, TX (Sun Bowl)	L 10–34	32,302	
*Non-conference game; Rankings from AP Poll released prior to the game

== Game summaries ==
=== Arizona State ===
Prior to the matchup against Arizona State, Wildcat coach Mudra contacted the Sun Bowl committee about the possibility of having the winner of the Arizona–ASU game play in the bowl game. Wyoming, the eventual WAC winner, had won the conference in the previous two seasons, but lost to Arizona in their head-to-head matchup in 1968 and defeated ASU. As a result, Arizona had a slight better conference record that both Wyoming and ASU and Mudra issued an ultimatum to the Sun Bowl committee that Arizona would either be invited to play regardless of the result of the ASU game or not play a bowl at all. The committee chose the Wildcats to appear in the bowl, much to the anger of ASU and their fans.

In the rivalry game itself, Arizona State shook off the controversy and defeated Arizona in a game that was known to fans as the “Ultimatum Bowl”. ASU was left out of a bowl game due to a lack of bowl games available at the time.

=== Auburn (Sun Bowl) ===
In their first bowl appearance since 1948, the Wildcats took on Auburn from the SEC. After a 10–10 tie at the half, the Tigers broke the game open in the second half on its way to a 34–10 victory.
