= Bill Laveroni =

American football coach

No. 51
- Position: Center

Career information
- High school: St. Ignatius High School
- College: California (1966-1969)

Career history
- St. Ignatius High School (1972–1976) Assistant coach; Piedmont High School (1977) Head coach; California (1978) Linebackers coach & tight ends coach; Utah State (1979–1982) Linebackers coach & offensive line coach; California (1983–1989) Offensive line coach; San Jose State (1990–1992) Offensive line coach & special teams coordinator; San Jose State (1993–1994) Offensive line coach; San Jose SaberCats (1995) Offensive line coach & defensive line coach; Rutgers (1996–2000) Offensive line coach & run game coordinator; Vanderbilt (2001) Offensive line coach; Seattle Seahawks (2002–2003) Assistant offensive line coach; Seattle Seahawks (2004–2007) Offensive line coach; Florida Tuskers (2009–2010) Offensive line coach; Virginia Destroyers (2011–2012) Offensive line coach; Sacramento State (2013–2015) Associate head coach & offensive line coach

Awards and highlights
- UFL champion (2011)

Bill Laveroni is an American former football coach. Laveroni spent forty years as a coach, including six seasons with the Seattle Seahawks.

== College playing career ==
Laveroni grew up in San Francisco and attended St. Ignatius High School, where he played center. A standout player, he was chosen for the 1966 Northern California–Southern California Shrine All-Star football game. Other participants in that game included Mike Holmgren and Jim Plunkett. Laveroni was a three-year starter for California at center (1967–69), where he earned a degree in criminology.

== Coaching career ==
In 1972, Laveroni became an assistant coach at St. Ignatius High, remaining there until 1976. He then became head coach at Piedmont High for one year before joining the college ranks. He coached linebackers and tight ends at his alma mater, California, before leaving for Utah State to coach the linebackers and offensive line from 1979 to 1982. Laveroni returned to California and coached the offensive line from 1983 to 1989, before leaving for San Jose State to coach the offensive line and special teams from 1990 to 1992. In 1993-94 he coached only the offensive line for the Spartans. He then joined the Arena League's San Jose SaberCats, coaching there for one season before starting a five-year career at Rutgers where he served as offensive line coach and run game coordinator (1996–2000). After Rutgers, he coached the Vanderbilt offensive line for a year before taking his first NFL job with the Seattle Seahawks. Laveroni was named assistant offensive line coach on April 2, 2002, and was promoted in 2004 after the retirement of longtime NFL offensive line coach Tom Lovat. During Laveroni's tenure as offensive line coach, the Seahawks won 4 division titles and played in Super Bowl XL. Following his time in Seattle, Laveroni worked as offensive line coach with the Florida Tuskers and Virginia Destroyers of the United Football League. Afterwards, he coached the Sacramento State offensive line for three seasons.
