= John Westbrook (American football) =

American pastor and football player (1947–1983)

John Hill Westbrook (November 13, 1947 – December 17, 1983) was a pastor and the first African American athlete to play in the Southwest Conference of American football during his time as a student at Baylor University.

== Early life and education ==
Westbrook was born in Groesbeck, Texas to Robert and Etta Mae (née McCracken) Westbrook. Robert Westbrook was a pastor at several churches over the years, including Mt. Moriah Baptist Church in Elgin, Texas. John was ordained as a preacher when he was 15, maintaining a tradition in his family going back four generations. He attended high school in Elgin, where he participated in multiple sports, including basketball and football, and was salutatorian of his class. John's older brother, Robert Jr., was a star running back in high school.

In 1965, he started college at Baylor University, joining the football team as a running back. He faced racist treatment from some teammates and coaches. At the time, very few African American students attended Baylor, and none had received a football scholarship. Nonetheless, Westbrook was awarded an athletic scholarship before his sophomore year. Head coach John Bridgers made the decision to have Westbrook play during the 1966 season-opening game against Syracuse University. On September 10, 1966, Westbrook took to field during the fourth quarter of the nationally televised game, becoming the first African American to play in the Southwest Conference. He played in several subsequent games that season, but due to a knee injury sustained during a game against Texas Christian University, his participation on the team was limited for the remainder of his time at Baylor. He graduated from Baylor with a degree in English and religion in 1969 and earned his master's degree in English from Southwest Missouri State University.

== Career and later life ==
Westbrook worked for the Fellowship of Christian Athletes in Kansas City before working in Nashville for the Southern Baptist Convention as a consultant on interracial issues. He was an athletic academic adviser at Florida State University and was a part-time English instructor at Wiley College in Marshall, Texas. He later served as pastor at True Vine Baptist Church in Tyler, Texas and Antioch Missionary Baptist Church in Houston. He was on the board of directors for the Association of Blacks in Higher Education and was on the Texas State Urban League Council. In 1978, he sought the Democratic nomination for Lieutenant Governor of Texas, but garnered only 23% of the vote, losing to William Hobby.

Westbrook married Paulette White, a native of Houston, in 1968. The couple had four children: Elicia, Kirsten, John Jr., and Elizabeth.

Westbrook died in 1983 from a pulmonary embolism at the age of 36. The funeral was held at Mt. Sinai Baptist Church in Houston, where the number of attendees exceeded the capacity of the church. Houston mayor Kathy Whitmire and Texas governor Mark White were in attendance.

== Legacy ==
In 2009, Baylor athletics established the John Westbrook Award for Courage and Perseverance. The annual award is presented to Baylor student-athletes (one male, one female) who have overcome various challenges to become successful and make positive contributions to their teams and communities. In 2016, 50 years after Westbrook played in the historic game against Syracuse, he was honored during a home game at Baylor. His family accepted the honor on his behalf.
