= 1968 Washington State Cougars football team =

American college football season

1968 Washington State Cougars football
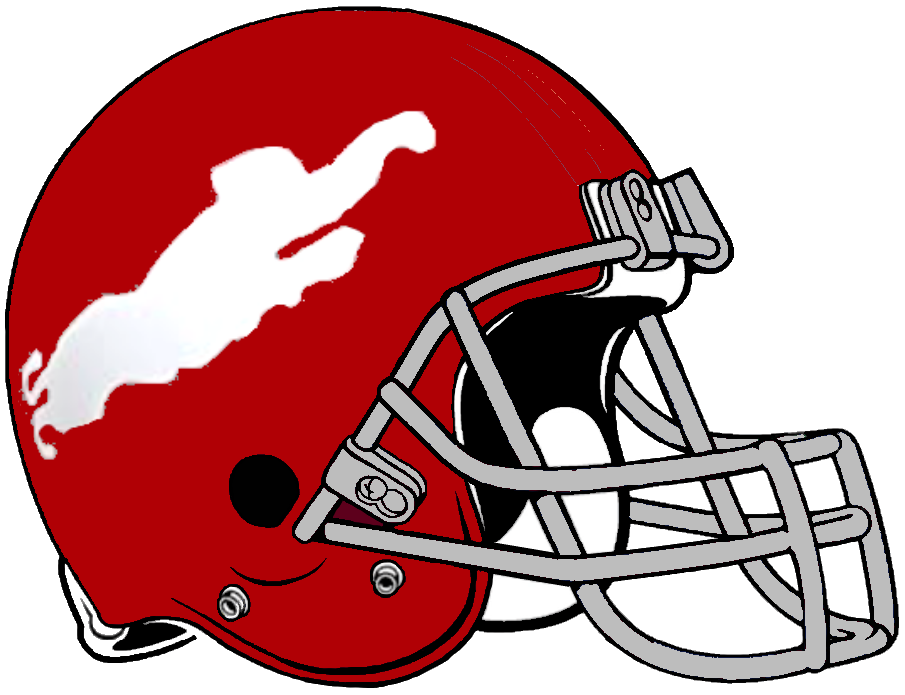
- Conference: Pacific-8 Conference
- Record: 3–6–1 (1–3–1 Pac-8)
- Head coach: Jim Sweeney (1st season)
- Home stadium: Rogers Field, Joe Albi Stadium

1968 Pacific-8 Conference football standings
	Conf.					Overall
Team	W		L		T	W		L		T
No. 4 USC $	6	–	0	–	0	9	–	1	–	1
No. 15 Oregon State	5	–	1	–	0	7	–	3	–	0
Stanford	3	–	3	–	1	6	–	3	–	1
California	2	–	2	–	1	7	–	3	–	1
Oregon	2	–	4	–	0	4	–	6	–	0
UCLA	2	–	4	–	0	3	–	7	–	0
Washington State	1	–	3	–	1	3	–	6	–	1
Washington	1	–	5	–	1	3	–	5	–	2
$ – Conference champion; Rankings from AP Poll

The 1968 Washington State Cougars football team was an American football team that represented Washington State University in the Pacific-8 Conference (Pac-8) during the 1968 NCAA University Division football season. In their first season under head coach Jim Sweeney, the Cougars compiled a 3–6–1 record (1–3–1 in Pac-8, seventh), and outscored their opponents 189 to 188. The final two games were shutout victories.

The team's statistical leaders included Jerry Henderson with 1,586 passing yards, Richard Lee Smith with 326 rushing yards, and Johnny Davis with 421 receiving yards.

The Cougars won a second straight Apple Cup from rival Washington, shutting out the Huskies 24–0 in Spokane. This was the last time that this rivalry game was played on natural grass. WSU played only five conference games, missing California and USC. Of the Cougars' five home games, three were played in Spokane.

Sweeney was hired in early January; he was previously the head coach for five seasons at Montana State in Bozeman. He retained alumnus Laurie Niemi on the staff, but Niemi died from cancer at age 42 in February.

== Schedule ==
Date	Opponent	Site	Result	Attendance	Source
September 21	Idaho*	Joe Albi Stadium; Spokane, WA (Battle of the Palouse)	W 14–7	23,612	
September 28	at No. 8 UCLA	Los Angeles Memorial Coliseum; Los Angeles, CA	L 21–31	41,759	
October 5	Utah*	Rogers Field; Pullman, WA	L 14–17	16,503	
October 12	at Arizona State*	Sun Devil Stadium; Tempe, AZ	L 14–41	36,226	
October 19	No. 14 Stanford	Joe Albi Stadium; Spokane, WA	T 21–21	15,700	
October 26	Oregon State^{†}	Rogers Field; Pullman, WA	L 8–16	20,781	
November 2	at Arizona*	Arizona Stadium; Tucson, AZ	L 14–28	31,400	
November 9	at Oregon	Autzen Stadium; Eugene, OR	L 13–27	23,000	
November 16	at San Jose State*	Spartan Stadium; San Jose, CA	W 46–0	8,450	
November 23	Washington	Joe Albi Stadium; Spokane, WA (Apple Cup)	W 24–0	31,986	
*Non-conference game; ^{†}Homecoming; Rankings from AP Poll released prior to the game

== Roster ==
1968 Washington State Cougars football team roster
Players
Coaches
Offense

Pos.	#	Name	Class
SE	42	Ed Armstrong	So
FB	32	Del Carmichael	Sr
QB	10	Hank Grenda	Sr
OT	73	Dave Golinsky	Sr
OT	70	Jim Guinn	Sr
G	76	Ty Hansell	Jr
C	50	Dave Harris	Sr
G	62	Jim Hellyer	Jr
QB	12	Jerry Henderson	Sr
G	66	Bill McCain	Sr
QB	11	Rich Olson	So
G	95	Erik Park	Sr
HB	21	Richard Smith	Jr
TE	81	Ron Souza	Sr
SE	45	Larry Thatcher	Sr
QB	13	Jack Wigmore	So
OT	77	Steve Van Sinderen	Sr

Defense

Pos.	#	Name	Class
LB	21	Steve Bartelle	Sr
DT	71	Dave Berger	Jr
MG	65	Hank Bendix	Jr
DT	75	Gary Branson	Jr
DE	82	Dave Crema	Jr
LB	58	Terry Durst	So
CB	26	Greg Field	Sr
LB	64	Jim Gorton	Sr
DE	82	Hank Maher	Jr
S	31	Jim Peterson	Jr
CB	23	Rick Reed	Sr
DB	40	Dick Schultz	Sr
S	44	Steve Shoun	Jr
DE	91	J.D. Smith	Sr
DE	93	Wayne Swayda	Sr
CB	20	Mark Williams	Sr

Special teams

Pos.	#	Name	Class
PK, P	10	Hank Grenda	Sr

Head coach

- Jim Sweeney (1st year)

Coordinators/assistant coaches

- Sam Jankovich (AHC)
- Pinky Erickson (freshmen)
- Jim Erkenbeck (DL)
- Sonny Holland (OL)
- Jim Shanley (DB)
- Don Lindsey (OB)
- Hugh Campbell (E)

Legend

- (C) Team captain
- (S) Suspended
- (I) Ineligible
- Injured
- Redshirt

== NFL/AFL draft ==
One Cougar was selected in the 1969 NFL/AFL draft.

Player	Position	Round	Overall	Franchise
Steve Van Sinderen	Tackle	7	172	San Francisco 49ers
