= Darrell Mudra =

American football coach (1929–2022)

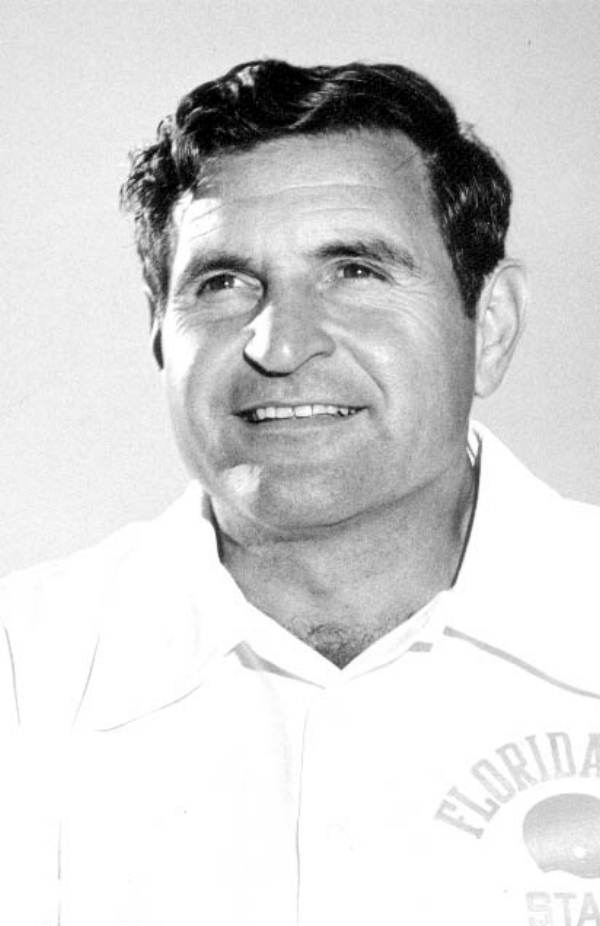
- Mudra in 1974

Biographical details
- Born: January 4, 1929; Omaha, Nebraska, U.S.
- Died: September 21, 2022 (aged 93)

Playing career

Football
- 1947–1950: Peru State
- Position: Fullback

Coaching career (HC unless noted)

Football
- 1953: Ashland HS (NE)
- 1954–1956: Tekamah HS (NE)
- 1957: Huron (backs)
- 1958: Colorado State College (backs)
- 1959–1962: Adams State
- 1963–1965: North Dakota State
- 1966: Montreal Alouettes
- 1967–1968: Arizona
- 1969–1973: Western Illinois
- 1974–1975: Florida State
- 1978–1982: Eastern Illinois
- 1983–1987: Northern Iowa

Basketball
- 1952–1953: Omaha (assistant)
- 1957–1958: Huron

Administrative career (AD unless noted)
- 1963–1966: North Dakota State

Head coaching record
- Overall: 200–81–4 (college football); 7–7 (CFL)
- Bowls: 3–1
- Tournaments: Football; 5–2 (NCAA D-II playoffs); 4–3 (NCAA D-I-AA playoffs)

Accomplishments and honors

Championships
- Football; 1 NCAA College Division (1965); 1 NCAA Division II (1978); 3 RMAC (1960–1962); 2 NCC (1964–1965); 1 IIAC (1969); 4 AMCU (1980–1982, 1984); 2 Gateway Collegiate (1985, 1987)

Awards
- WAC Coach of the Year (1968)
- College Football Hall of Fame; Inducted in 2000 (profile)

Darrell E. Mudra Sr. (January 4, 1929 – September 21, 2022), nicknamed "Dr. Victory", was an American football coach. He served as the head football coach at Adams State College (1959–1962), North Dakota State University (1963–1965), the University of Arizona (1967–1968), Western Illinois University (1969–1973), Florida State University (1974–1975), Eastern Illinois University (1978–1982), and the University of Northern Iowa (1983–1987), compiling a career college football record of 200–81–4. Mudra was also the head coach of the Montreal Alouettes of the Canadian Football League (CFL) for one season in 1966. He was inducted into the College Football Hall of Fame as a coach in 2000.

== Early life and career ==
Mudra was born on January 4, 1929. He had six siblings and was raised in Omaha, Nebraska. Mudra graduated from Omaha South High School in 1946. He earned two letters in football and basketball apiece. He attended Peru State College and played as a fullback on their football team. He earned letters in all four years at Peru State and was named All-Conference in his junior and senior years. He graduated from Peru State in 1951.

== Coaching career ==
=== 1951–1965 ===
In 1951, Mudra coached in Pop Warner football, leading his team to the national championship game. Mudra was hired as an assistant basketball coach at the University of Omaha—now known as the University of Nebraska Omaha—in 1952, where he was also pursuing a master's degree in English. He was hired as the head basketball coach and assistant football coach for Ashland High School in Ashland, Nebraska, in 1953. He was hired to coach for Tekamah High School in Tekamah, Nebraska, in 1954. His basketball teams at Tekemah won two conference championships. Mudra was hired as an assistant football coach at Huron University in 1957. He resigned from Huron in May 1958 to accept a fellowship for the Doctor of Education in physical education at Colorado State College and also serve as an assistant coach on their football team.

Mudra served as the head football coach at Adams State College from 1959 to 1962. He had a 32–4–1 (.878) record for the Adams State Indians football team and won the Rocky Mountain Athletic Conference championship in three consecutive years from 1960 to 1962. In 1962, Adams State defeated Northern Illinois University in the Mineral Water Bowl. Mudra was hired to coach at the North Dakota State University in 1963. The North Dakota State Bison had a 0–10 record in 1962. Under Mudra's coaching, they finished with a 3–5 record in 1963 and a 10–1 record in 1964. winning the North Central Conference championship. North Dakota State was invited to the Mineral Water Bowl, where they defeated Western State College of Colorado. The team went 11–0 in 1965, again winning the conference championship, the Pecan Bowl against Grambling State University, and the school's first national championship. He earned his Doctor of Education from Colorado State College in 1964.

=== 1966–1976 ===
In 1966, Mudra signed a three-year contract to coach the Montreal Alouettes of the Canadian Football League (CFL). They had a 7–7 record in the 1966 CFL season, the team's best finish since 1956. The Alouettes made the CFL postseason, but lost to the Hamilton Tiger-Cats in the conference semi-finals. After one year, Mudra resigned from Montreal to accept the head coaching position for the University of Arizona. The Arizona Wildcats had 3–7 records in the previous two seasons. In Mudra's first year, Arizona went 3–6–1 in 1967. They went 8–1 in 1968, and were invited to the 1968 Sun Bowl, which Arizona lost to the Auburn Tigers. Mudra left Arizona in 1969 for Western Illinois University. The Western Illinois Leathernecks football team had a 2–7–1 record in their previous season. In five seasons from 1969 to 1973, Mudra's Leathernecks had a 39–13 (.750) record. The Leathernecks won the Illinois Intercollegiate Athletic Conference championship in the 1969 season, and appeared in the 1973 NCAA Division II quarterfinals.

Mudra was hired by Florida State University to coach the Florida State Seminoles football team in January 1974. The Seminoles finished the 1973 season 0–11 and coach Larry Jones resigned in disgrace with the NCAA putting Florida State on probation for one year. Mudra had a 4–18 (.182) record in the 1974 and 1975 seasons, and was fired and replaced by Bobby Bowden. He said that he did not know why he was fired. Mudra took two years off from college coaching to coach youth football for 12-year-olds.

=== 1977–1993 ===
Mudra next coached the Eastern Illinois Panthers at Eastern Illinois University. By the time he was hired in 1977, Mudra earned the nickname "Dr. Victory", owing to his ability to inherit struggling programs and turn them into winners. Eastern Illinois had a 1–10 season in 1977, before Mudra's hiring. Mudra's 1978 Eastern Illinois team went 12–2 and won the NCAA Division II Championship. Eastern Illinois won the Association of Mid-Continent Universities conference in the 1980, 1981, and 1982 seasons.

Seeking to turn around another struggling program, Mudra resigned from Eastern Illinois in December 1982 to accept the head coaching position with the University of Northern Iowa, after they finished their previous season with a 4–6–1 record. The Northern Iowa Panthers won the Gateway Football Conference in the 1985 and 1987 seasons. Twice, he led the Panthers to the NCAA Division I-AA semifinals. In 1993, Mudra came out of retirement to coach a football team based in Florence, Italy.

Mudra compiled a career college football record of 200–81–4 (.709). He was inducted into the College Football Hall of Fame as a coach in 2000.

Mudra had an unorthodox coaching style. Throughout his days as a head coach, Mudra worked from the press box while a game was being played rather the sideline as most head coaches do.

== Personal life ==
Mudra and his wife, Jean, retired to Crawfordville, Florida. They had four children.

Mudra died on September 21, 2022, at age 93.

== Head coaching record ==
=== College football ===
Year	Team	Overall	Conference	Standing	Bowl/playoffs	Coaches^{#}	AP^{°}
Adams State Indians (Rocky Mountain Conference) (1959–1962)
1959	Adams State	8–1	3–1	2nd			
1960	Adams State	7–0–1	4–0	1st			
1961	Adams State	8–2	4–0	1st			
1962	Adams State	9–1	4–0	1st	W Mineral Water		
Adams State:		32–4–1	15–1				
North Dakota State Bison (North Central Conference) (1963–1965)
1963	North Dakota State	3–5	3–3	4th			
1964	North Dakota State	10–1	5–1	T–1st	W Mineral Water		
1965	North Dakota State	11–0	6–0	1st	W Pecan		
North Dakota State:		24–6	14–4				
Arizona Wildcats (Western Athletic Conference) (1967–1968)
1967	Arizona	3–6–1	1–4	5th			
1968	Arizona	8–3	5–1	T–2nd	L Sun		
Arizona:		11–9–1	6–5				
Western Illinois Leathernecks (Interstate Intercollegiate Athletic Conference) (1969)
1969	Western Illinois	8–2	3–0	1st			
Western Illinois Leathernecks (NCAA College Division / Division II independent) (1970–1973)
1970	Western Illinois	7–3					
1971	Western Illinois	8–2					
1972	Western Illinois	9–2					
1973	Western Illinois	7–4			L NCAA Division II Quarterfinal		
Western Illinois:		39–13	3–0				
Florida State Seminoles (NCAA Division I independent) (1974–1975)
1974	Florida State	1–10					
1975	Florida State	3–8					
Florida State:		4–18					
Eastern Illinois Panthers (Association of Mid-Continent Universities) (1978–1982)
1978	Eastern Illinois	12–2	3–2	3rd	W NCAA Division II Championship		
1979	Eastern Illinois	7–4	1–3	T–4th			
1980	Eastern Illinois	11–3	4–0	1st	L NCAA Division II Championship		
1981	Eastern Illinois	6–5	2–1	T–1st			
1982	Eastern Illinois	11–1–1	2–0–1	T–1st	L NCAA Division I-AA Quarterfinal		
Eastern Illinois:		47–15–1	12–6–1				
Northern Iowa Panthers (Association of Mid-Continent Universities) (1983–1984)
1983	Northern Iowa	6–5	1–2	3rd			
1984	Northern Iowa	9–2	2–1	T–1st			
Northern Iowa Panthers (Gateway Football Conference) (1985–1987)
1985	Northern Iowa	11–2	5–0	1st	L NCAA Division I-AA Semifinal		
1986	Northern Iowa	7–3–1	4–2	T–2nd			
1987	Northern Iowa	10–4	6–0	1st	L NCAA Division I-AA Semifinal		
Northern Iowa:		43–16–1	18–5				
Total:		200–81–4					
National championship Conference title Conference division title or championship game berth

== See also ==
- List of college football career coaching wins leaders
