= 1968 Colorado State Rams football team =

American college football season

1968 Colorado State Rams football
- Conference: Western Athletic Conference
- Record: 2–8 (1–4 WAC)
- Head coach: Mike Lude (7th season)
- Home stadium: Hughes Stadium

1968 Western Athletic Conference football standings
	Conf.					Overall
Team	W		L		T	W		L		T
Wyoming $	6	–	1	–	0	7	–	3	–	0
Arizona State	5	–	1	–	0	8	–	2	–	0
Arizona	5	–	1	–	0	8	–	3	–	0
UTEP	3	–	3	–	0	4	–	5	–	1
Utah	2	–	3	–	0	3	–	7	–	0
Colorado State	1	–	4	–	0	2	–	8	–	0
BYU	1	–	5	–	0	2	–	8	–	0
New Mexico	0	–	7	–	0	0	–	10	–	0
$ – Conference champion; Colorado State's games against Texas Tech and Air Force counted in the conference standings.

The 1968 Colorado State Rams football team represented Colorado State University in the Western Athletic Conference (WAC) during the 1968 NCAA University Division football season. In their seventh season under head coach Mike Lude, the Rams compiled an overall record of 2–8 and a conference mark of 1–4, placing sixth in the WAC. The games against Texas Tech and Air Force counted in the conference standings even though neither of those teams was a member of the WAC.

== Schedule ==
Date	Opponent	Site	Result	Attendance	Source
September 14	at New Mexico	University Stadium; Albuquerque, NM	W 21–13	16,992	
September 21	at Kansas State*	KSU Stadium; Manhattan, KS	L 0–21	22,641	
September 28	North Texas State*	Hughes Stadium; Fort Collins, CO	L 12–17	22,000	
October 5	at Texas Tech (Note: Colorado State's games against Texas Tech and Air Force counted in the WAC standings.)	Jones Stadium; Lubbock, TX	L 13–43	35,111	
October 12	at Wichita State*	Veterans Field; Wichita, KS	W 37–15	8,226	
October 19	Air Force	Hughes Stadium; Fort Collins, CO (rivalry)	L 0–31	28,906	
October 26	Pacific (CA)*^{†}	Hughes Stadium; Fort Collins, CO	L 0–31	12,003–14,200	
November 2	Wyoming	Hughes Stadium; Fort Collins, CO (rivalry)	L 14–46	22,500	
November 16	West Texas State*	Hughes Stadium; Fort Collins, CO	L 17–22	7,604	
November 23	at UTEP	Sun Bowl; El Paso, TX	L 19–23	13,125	
*Non-conference game; ^{†}Homecoming
