= 1968 USC Trojans football team =

American college football season

1968 USC Trojans football

Pac-8 champion

Rose Bowl, L 16–27 vs. Ohio State
- Conference: Pacific-8 Conference

Ranking
- Coaches: No. 2
- AP: No. 4
- Record: 9–1–1 (6–0 Pac-8)
- Head coach: John McKay (9th season)
- Defensive coordinator: Dick Coury (3rd season)
- Captains: O. J. Simpson; Steve Sogge
- Home stadium: Los Angeles Memorial Coliseum

1968 Pacific-8 Conference football standings
	Conf.					Overall
Team	W		L		T	W		L		T
No. 4 USC $	6	–	0	–	0	9	–	1	–	1
No. 15 Oregon State	5	–	1	–	0	7	–	3	–	0
Stanford	3	–	3	–	1	6	–	3	–	1
California	2	–	2	–	1	7	–	3	–	1
Oregon	2	–	4	–	0	4	–	6	–	0
UCLA	2	–	4	–	0	3	–	7	–	0
Washington State	1	–	3	–	1	3	–	6	–	1
Washington	1	–	5	–	1	3	–	5	–	2
$ – Conference champion; Rankings from AP Poll

The 1968 USC Trojans football team represented the University of Southern California (USC) in the 1968 NCAA University Division football season. In their ninth year under head coach John McKay, the Trojans compiled a 9–1–1 record (6–0 against conference opponents), won the Pacific-8 Conference (Pac-8) championship, and outscored their opponents by a combined total of 259 to 168. The team was ranked #2 in the final Coaches Poll and #4 in the final AP Poll.

Steve Sogge led the team in passing, completing 122 of 207 passes for 1,454 yards with nine touchdowns and nine interceptions. O. J. Simpson led the team in rushing with 383 carries for 1,880 yards and 23 touchdowns. Jim Lawrence led the team in receiving with 26 catches for 386 yards and two touchdowns. Simpson won both the Heisman Trophy and the Walter Camp Award.

== Schedule ==
Date	Opponent	Rank	Site	Result	Attendance	Source
September 21	at No. 16 Minnesota*	No. 2	Memorial Stadium; Minneapolis, MN	W 29–20	60,820	
September 28	at Northwestern*	No. 3	Dyche Stadium; Evanston, IL	W 24–7	47,277	
October 5	No. 13 Miami (FL)*	No. 2	Los Angeles Memorial Coliseum; Los Angeles, CA	W 28–3	71,189	
October 12	at No. 18 Stanford	No. 2	Stanford Stadium; Stanford, CA (rivalry)	W 27–24	81,000	
October 19	Washington	No. 1	Los Angeles Memorial Coliseum; Los Angeles, CA	W 14–7	60,990	
November 2	at Oregon	No. 1	Autzen Stadium; Eugene, OR	W 20–13	33,500	
November 9	No. 11 California^{†}	No. 1	Los Angeles Memorial Coliseum; Los Angeles, CA	W 35–17	80,871	
November 16	No. 13 Oregon State	No. 1	Los Angeles Memorial Coliseum; Los Angeles, CA	W 17–13	59,236	
November 23	at UCLA	No. 1	Los Angeles Memorial Coliseum; Los Angeles, CA (Victory Bell)	W 28–16	75,066	
November 30	No. 9 Notre Dame*	No. 2	Los Angeles Memorial Coliseum; Los Angeles, CA (rivalry)	T 21–21	82,659	
January 1, 1969	vs. No. 1 Ohio State*	No. 2	Rose Bowl; Pasadena, CA (Rose Bowl)	L 16–27	102,063	
*Non-conference game; ^{†}Homecoming; Rankings from AP Poll released prior to the game

== Game summaries ==
=== Minnesota ===
- OJ Simpson 39 rushes, 236 yards

=== Stanford ===
- O.J. Simpson 47 rushes, 220 yards

=== Oregon State ===
- O.J. Simpson 47 rushes, 238 yards

=== Vs. Ohio State (Rose Bowl) ===
No. 1 Ohio State vs. No. 2 USC

Team	1	2	3	4	Total
• No. 1 Buckeyes	0	10	3	14	27
No. 2 Trojans	0	10	0	6	16

- Date: January 1, 1969
- Location:
  Rose Bowl
  Pasadena, CA
- Game start: 5:00 p.m. EST
- Game attendance: 102,063
- Game weather: Sunny; 84 °F (29 °C)
- Referee: Charles Moffett
- TV announcers (NBC): Curt Gowdy Kyle Rote

Scoring summary
2	9:40	USC	Ayala 21-yard field goal	USC 3–0
2	6:38	USC	Simpson 80-yard run (Ayala kick)	USC 10–0
2	1:45	OSU	Otis 1-yard run (Roman kick)	USC 10–7
2	0:03	OSU	Roman 26-yard field goal	Tie 10–10
3	1:40	OSU	Roman 25-yard field goal	OSU 13–10
4	13:52	OSU	Hayden 4-yard pass from Kern (Roman kick)	OSU 20–10
4	10:05	OSU	Gillian 16-yard pass from Kern (Roman kick)	OSU 27–10
4	0:45	USC	Dickerson 19-yard pass from Sogge (pass failed)	OSU 27–16

== Roster ==
1968 USC Trojans football team roster
Players
Coaches
Offense

Pos.	#	Name	Class
WR	9	Bob Chandler	So
QB	7	Mike Holmgren	Jr
QB	8	Jimmy Jones	Fr
TE	84	Bob Klein	Sr
WR	28	Jim Lawrence	Sr
TE	86	Bob Miller	Sr
OT	78	Marv Montgomery	Jr
QB	6	Steve Sogge	Sr
RB	32	O. J. Simpson	Sr
OT	77	Sid Smith	Jr

Defense

Pos.	#	Name	Class
FS	17	Mike Battle	Sr
DT	72	Al Cowlings	Jr
CB	16	Sandy Durko	Jr
DE	83	Jimmy Gunn	Jr
DE	85	Bill Hayhoe	Sr
LB	55	Jim Snow	Sr

Special teams

Pos.	#	Name	Class

Head coach

- John McKay

Coordinators/assistant coaches

Legend

- (C) Team captain
- (S) Suspended
- (I) Ineligible
- Injured
- Redshirt

== Awards and honors ==
- O. J. Simpson: Heisman Trophy, Walter Camp Award

== 1969 NFL/AFL draft ==
Eight Trojans were selected in the 1969 NFL/AFL draft, held in late January.

Player	Position	Round	Overall	Franchise
O. J. Simpson	Running back	1	1	Buffalo Bills
Bob Klein	Tight end	1	21	Los Angeles Rams
Bill Hayhoe	Defensive tackle	5	116	Green Bay Packers
Bob Miller	Tackle	6	138	New Orleans Saints
Jim Lawrence	Back	8	189	New Orleans Saints
Jack O’Malley	Tackle	12	302	San Francisco 49ers
Mike Battle	Defensive back	12	311	New York Jets
Wilson Bowie	Running back	13	320	Detroit Lions
