= 1968 Rice Owls football team =

American college football season

1968 Rice Owls football
- Conference: Southwest Conference
- Record: 0–9–1 (0–7 SWC)
- Head coach: Bo Hagan (2nd season)
- Home stadium: Rice Stadium

1968 Southwest Conference football standings
	Conf.					Overall
Team	W		L		T	W		L		T
No. 6 Arkansas +	6	–	1	–	0	10	–	1	–	0
No. 3 Texas +	6	–	1	–	0	9	–	1	–	1
No. 14 SMU	5	–	2	–	0	8	–	3	–	0
Texas Tech	4	–	3	–	0	5	–	3	–	2
Baylor	3	–	4	–	0	3	–	7	–	0
Texas A&M	2	–	5	–	0	3	–	7	–	0
TCU	2	–	5	–	0	3	–	7	–	0
Rice	0	–	7	–	0	0	–	9	–	1
+ – Conference co-champions; Rankings from AP Poll

The 1968 Rice Owls football team represented Rice University during the 1968 NCAA University Division football season. In its second season under head coach Bo Hagan, the team compiled a 0–9–1 record, finished last in the conference, and was outscored by a total of 326 to 156. The team played its home games at Rice Stadium in Houston.

The team's statistical leaders included Robby Shelton with 594 passing yards and 681 rushing yards, Larry Davis with 410 receiving yards, and Tony Conley with 48 points scored.

== Schedule ==
Date	Opponent	Site	Result	Attendance	Source
September 21	at Washington*	Husky Stadium; Seattle, WA	T 35–35	50,038	
September 28	No. 14 LSU*	Rice Stadium; Houston, TX	L 7–21	59,000	
October 5	No. 15 Tennessee*	Rice Stadium; Houston, TX	L 0–52	25,000	
October 19	at SMU	Cotton Bowl; Dallas, TX (rivalry)	L 24–32	25,000	
October 26	No. 13 Texas	Rice Stadium; Houston, TX (rivalry)	L 14–38	68,500	
November 2	Texas Tech	Rice Stadium; Houston, TX	L 15–38	20,000	
November 9	at No. 14 Arkansas	Razorback Stadium; Fayetteville, AR	L 21–46	43,817	
November 16	at Texas A&M	Kyle Field; College Station, TX	L 14–24	32,000	
November 23	TCU	Rice Stadium; Houston, TX	L 14–24	18,000	
November 30	at Baylor	Baylor Stadium; Waco, TX	L 7–16	4,000	
*Non-conference game; Rankings from AP Poll released prior to the game
