= 1968 Stanford Indians football team =

American college football season

1968 Stanford Indians football
- Conference: Pacific-8 Conference
- Record: 6–3–1 (3–3–1 Pac-8)
- Head coach: John Ralston (6th season)
- Home stadium: Stanford Stadium

1968 Pacific-8 Conference football standings
| | Conf. | | | | | Overall |
| Team | W | | L | | T | W | | L | | T |
|---|---|---|---|---|---|---|---|---|---|---|
| No. 4 USC $ | 6 | – | 0 | – | 0 | 9 | – | 1 | – | 1 |
| No. 15 Oregon State | 5 | – | 1 | – | 0 | 7 | – | 3 | – | 0 |
| Stanford | 3 | – | 3 | – | 1 | 6 | – | 3 | – | 1 |
| California | 2 | – | 2 | – | 1 | 7 | – | 3 | – | 1 |
| Oregon | 2 | – | 4 | – | 0 | 4 | – | 6 | – | 0 |
| UCLA | 2 | – | 4 | – | 0 | 3 | – | 7 | – | 0 |
| Washington State | 1 | – | 3 | – | 1 | 3 | – | 6 | – | 1 |
| Washington | 1 | – | 5 | – | 1 | 3 | – | 5 | – | 2 |
$ – Conference champion; Rankings from AP Poll

The 1968 Stanford Indians football team represented Stanford University during the 1968 NCAA University Division football season. The Indians were led by sixth-year head coach John Ralston. On the field, the offense was headed by future Heisman Trophy winner Jim Plunkett, a sophomore in his first season as starting quarterback, and senior wide receiver Gene Washington.

== Schedule ==
| Date | Opponent | Rank | Site | Result | Attendance | Source |
|---|---|---|---|---|---|---|
| September 21 | San Jose State* | | Stanford Stadium; Stanford, CA (rivalry) | W 68–20 | 34,000–34,500 | |
| September 28 | at Oregon | | Autzen Stadium; Eugene, OR | W 28–12 | 25,000 | |
| October 5 | at No. 13 Air Force* | | Stanford Stadium; Stanford, CA | W 24–13 | 35,000 | |
| October 12 | No. 2 USC | No. 18 | Stanford Stadium; Stanford, CA (rivalry) | L 24–27 | 81,000 | |
| October 19 | at Washington State | No. 14 | Joe Albi Stadium; Spokane, WA | T 21–21 | 15,700 | |
| October 26 | at UCLA | | Los Angeles Memorial Coliseum; Los Angeles, CA | L 17–20 | 37,935 | |
| November 2 | Oregon State | | Stanford Stadium; Stanford, CA | L 7–29 | 29,000 | |
| November 9 | Washington | | Stanford Stadium; Stanford, CA | W 35–20 | 33,000 | |
| November 16 | at No. 4 Pacific (CA)* | | Pacific Memorial Stadium; Stockton, CA | W 24–0 | 20,500 | |
| November 23 | at No. 18 California | | California Memorial Stadium; Berkeley, CA (Big Game) | W 20–0 | 73,987–75,000 | |
*Non-conference game; Rankings from AP Poll released prior to the game

== Roster ==
1968 Stanford Indians football team roster
Players
Coaches
Offense

| Pos. | # | Name | Class |
|---|---|---|---|
| QB | 16 | Jim Plunkett | So |
| WR | 18 | Gene Washington | Sr |
| OL | | Malcolm Snider | Jr |
| WR | | Bob Moore | So |
| OL | | George Buehler | Sr |

Defense

| Pos. | # | Name | Class |
|---|---|---|---|
| LB | | Don Parish | Jr |
| DL | | Bill Nicholson | Jr |

Special teams

| Pos. | # | Name | Class |
|---|---|---|---|
| K | | Bill Shoemaker | Sr |

Head coach

- John Ralston (6th year)

Coordinators/assistant coaches

- Mike White – Offensive line
- Bob Waters – Wide receivers
- Dick Vermeil – Backfield
- Terry DeSylvia – Defense
- Edward Peasley – Defensive line
- Jack Christiansen – Linebackers
- Bill Moultrie – Defensive backs
- Roger Theder – Backs
- Jim Troppman – Assistant
- Bob Gambold – Assistant

Legend

- (C) Team captain
- (S) Suspended
- (I) Ineligible
- Injured
- Redshirt

== NFL/AFL draft ==
| Player | Position | Round | Pick | Franchise |
| Gene Washington | Wide receiver | 1 | 16 | San Francisco 49ers |
| George Buehler | Guard | 2 | 50 | Oakland Raiders |
| Malcolm Snider | Guard | 3 | 54 | Atlanta Falcons |
| Bill Nicholson | Defensive end | 6 | 144 | Chicago Bears |
| Bill Shoemaker | Kicker | 15 | 369 | Cincinnati Bengals |
