= 1968 Sun Bowl =

American college football game

- 35th Sun Bowl
Auburn Tigers	Arizona Wildcats
(6–4)	(8–2)
SEC	WAC
34	10
Head coach: Ralph Jordan	Head coach: Darrell Mudra
	1	2	3	4	Total
Auburn	10	0	14	10	34
Arizona	0	10	0	0	10
- Date: December 28, 1968
- Season: 1968
- Stadium: Sun Bowl
- Location: El Paso, Texas
- MVP: DB Buddy McClinton (Auburn)
- Referee: R. Pete Williams (SEC) (split crew: SEC, WAC)
- Attendance: 32,302

United States TV coverage
- Network: CBS
- Announcers: Lindsey Nelson; Frank Gifford

The 1968 Sun Bowl featured the Arizona Wildcats and the Auburn Tigers.

== Background ==
The Wildcats had finished tied for 2nd in the Western Athletic Conference in their second year under Coach Mudra, improving from 3–6–1 the previous year to earn their first bowl appearance since 1949. The Tigers had finished tied for third in the Southeastern Conference in their first bowl game since 1965. This was the first Sun Bowl for either team. This was the first Sun Bowl broadcast by CBS. The partnership of CBS and the Sun Bowl is the longest continuous relationship between a bowl game and one TV network.

== Game summary ==
A John Riley 52-yard field goal and a 65-yard touchdown pass from Loran Carter to Mickey Zofko gave the Tigers a 10-0 lead after one quarter. The Wildcats responded with a Steve Hurley 32 yard field goal and a Hal Arnason 12 yard touchdown catch from Bruce Lee (with 54 seconds remaining in the half) to make it tied at 10 after one half of play. In the second half, Auburn took control in the span of 24 seconds. Tommy Taylor scored from 9 yards out to make it 17–10. On the ensuing possession for Arizona, Buddy McClinton intercepted a Lee pass and returned it 32 yards for a touchdown score to make it 24–10. When Auburn got the ball back, Carter threw a 42 yard touchdown pass to Tim Christian to make it 31–10. A Riley field goal made the final score 34–10. Auburn's Buddy McClinton caught three interceptions, had six tackles and scored a touchdown off an interception return en route to being named MVP, the first defensive back to be awarded the honor in the Sun Bowl. Lee set a record for most interceptions in the Sun Bowl with 6, on a miserable 6-of-24 for 89 yard performance. While Carter went 7-of-28 passing on three interceptions, he threw for 158 yards with two touchdowns.

== Aftermath ==
The Wildcats did not return to the Sun Bowl again until 1985. The Tigers did not return again until 1973.

== Statistics ==
Statistics	Auburn	Arizona
First downs	12	16
Rushing yards	147	70
Passing yards	156	164
Total offense	303	234
Interceptions	3	8
Punts–average	7–26.4	11–34.3
Fumbles–lost	3–2	2–1
Penalties–yards	4–36	4–38
