= 1968 Texas A&M Aggies football team =

American college football season

1968 Texas A&M Aggies football
- Conference: Southwest Conference
- Record: 3–7 (2–5 SWC)
- Head coach: Gene Stallings (4th season)
- Home stadium: Kyle Field

1968 Southwest Conference football standings
	Conf.					Overall
Team	W		L		T	W		L		T
No. 6 Arkansas +	6	–	1	–	0	10	–	1	–	0
No. 3 Texas +	6	–	1	–	0	9	–	1	–	1
No. 14 SMU	5	–	2	–	0	8	–	3	–	0
Texas Tech	4	–	3	–	0	5	–	3	–	2
Baylor	3	–	4	–	0	3	–	7	–	0
Texas A&M	2	–	5	–	0	3	–	7	–	0
TCU	2	–	5	–	0	3	–	7	–	0
Rice	0	–	7	–	0	0	–	9	–	1
+ – Conference co-champions; Rankings from AP Poll

The 1968 Texas A&M Aggies football team represented Texas A&M University in the 1968 NCAA University Division football season as a member of the Southwest Conference (SWC). The Aggies were led by head coach Gene Stallings in his fourth season and finished with a record of three wins and seven losses (3–7 overall, 2–5 in the SWC).

== Schedule ==
Date	Time	Opponent	Rank	Site	TV	Result	Attendance	Source
September 21		at No. 20 LSU*	No. 13	Tiger Stadium; Baton Rouge, LA (rivalry)		L 12–13	68,000	
September 28		at Tulane*		Tulane Stadium; New Orleans, LA		W 35–3	21,600	
October 5		at Florida State*	No. 17	Doak Campbell Stadium; Tallahassee, FL		L 14–20	35,494	
October 12		Texas Tech		Kyle Field; College Station, TX (rivalry)		L 16–21	45,000	
October 19		TCU		Kyle Field; College Station, TX (rivalry)		W 27–7	33,185	
October 26		at Baylor		Baylor Stadium; Waco, TX (rivalry)		L 9–10	40,000	
November 2		No. 17 Arkansas		Kyle Field; College Station, TX (rivalry)		L 22–25	41,925	
November 9		at SMU		Cotton Bowl; Dallas, TX		L 23–36	42,000	
November 16		Rice		Kyle Field; College Station, TX		W 24–14	32,000	
November 28	2:00 p.m.	at No. 6 Texas		Memorial Stadium; Austin, TX (rivalry)	CBS	L 14–35	66,397	
*Non-conference game; Rankings from AP Poll released prior to the game; All times are in Central time

== Roster ==
1968 Texas A&M Aggies football team roster
Players
Coaches
Offense

Pos.	#	Name	Class
TE, OT	80	Tom Buckman	Sr
QB	10	Ed Hargett	Sr
RB	25	Larry Stegent	Jr

Defense Mike DeNiro* DL

Pos.	#	Name	Class
DT	70	Harvey Aschenbeck	Sr
DB	33	Ross Brupbacher	Jr
DB	36	Dave Elmendorf	So
DB	11	Curley Hallman	Sr

Special teams

Pos.	#	Name	Class
P	18	Steve O'Neal	Sr

Head coach

- Gene Stallings

Coordinators/assistant coaches

Legend

- (C) Team captain
- (S) Suspended
- (I) Ineligible
- Injured
- Redshirt
