= 1968 Arkansas Razorbacks football team =

American college football season

1968 Arkansas Razorbacks football

SWC co-champion Sugar Bowl champion

Sugar Bowl, W 16–2 vs. Georgia
- Conference: Southwest Conference

Ranking
- Coaches: No. 9
- AP: No. 6
- Record: 10–1 (6–1 SWC)
- Head coach: Frank Broyles (11th season)
- Offensive scheme: Multiple
- Defensive coordinator: Charlie Coffey (3rd season)
- Base defense: 4–3
- Captains: Gary Adams; Jim Barnes
- Home stadium: Razorback Stadium; War Memorial Stadium

1968 Southwest Conference football standings
	Conf.					Overall
Team	W		L		T	W		L		T
No. 6 Arkansas +	6	–	1	–	0	10	–	1	–	0
No. 3 Texas +	6	–	1	–	0	9	–	1	–	1
No. 14 SMU	5	–	2	–	0	8	–	3	–	0
Texas Tech	4	–	3	–	0	5	–	3	–	2
Baylor	3	–	4	–	0	3	–	7	–	0
Texas A&M	2	–	5	–	0	3	–	7	–	0
TCU	2	–	5	–	0	3	–	7	–	0
Rice	0	–	7	–	0	0	–	9	–	1
+ – Conference co-champions; Rankings from AP Poll

The 1968 Arkansas Razorbacks football team represented the University of Arkansas in the Southwest Conference (SWC) during the 1968 NCAA University Division football season. In their 11th year under head coach Frank Broyles, the Razorbacks compiled a 10–1 record (6–1 against SWC opponents), shared the SWC championship, and outscored all opponents by a combined total of 350 to 189. The team finished the season ranked No. 6 in the final AP poll and No. 9 in the final UPI Coaches Poll and went on to defeat Georgia in the 1969 Sugar Bowl. Offensive guard Jim Barnes was selected by the AP and Central Press as a first-team player on the 1968 College Football All-America Team.

== Schedule ==
Date	Opponent	Rank	Site	TV	Result	Attendance	Source
September 21	Oklahoma State*		War Memorial Stadium; Little Rock, AR		W 32–15	53,307	
September 28	Tulsa*		Razorback Stadium; Fayetteville, AR		W 56–13	41,000–41,712	
October 5	at TCU	No. 20	Amon G. Carter Stadium; Fort Worth, TX		W 17–7	41,126	
October 12	Baylor	No. 14	Razorback Stadium; Fayetteville, AR		W 35–19	41,429	
October 19	at No. 17 Texas	No. 9	Memorial Stadium; Austin, TX (rivalry)		L 29–39	66,397	
October 26	North Texas State*	No. 16	War Memorial Stadium; Little Rock, AR		W 17–15	45,000–45,802	
November 2	at Texas A&M	No. 17	Kyle Field; College Station, TX (rivalry)		W 25–22	41,925	
November 9	Rice	No. 14	Razorback Stadium; Fayetteville, AR		W 46–21	43,817	
November 16	SMU	No. 10	War Memorial Stadium; Little Rock, AR		W 35–29	49,112	
November 23	at Texas Tech	No. 6	Jones Stadium; Lubbock, TX (rivalry)		W 42–7	48,165	
January 1	vs. No. 4 Georgia	No. 9	Tulane Stadium; New Orleans, LA (Sugar Bowl)	NBC	W 16–2	82,113	
*Non-conference game; Rankings from AP Poll released prior to the game

== Roster ==
1968 Arkansas Razorbacks football team roster
Players
Coaches
Offense

Pos.	#	Name	Class
G	55	Jim Barnes	So
C	57	Rodney Brand	Jr
RB	33	Bill Burnett	So
WR	80	David Cox	Jr
RB	44	David Dickey	Sr
WR	20	Chuck Dicus	So
G	74	Jerry Dossey	Jr
QB	15	John Eichler	Jr
OT	70	Ronnie Hammers	So
OT	73	Webb Hubbell	Sr
RB	34	Bruce Maxwell	Jr
G	69	Pat May	Sr
QB	10	Bill Montgomery	So
TE	88	Pat Morrison	So
WR	46	Max Peacock	Sr
TE	81	Mike Sigman	Sr
OT	75	Bob Stankovich	Jr

Defense

Pos.	#	Name	Class
DB	22	Gary Adams	Sr
DT	61	Dick Bumpas	So
DE	87	Tommy Dew	Jr
DB	25	Tommy Dixon	Sr
DL	53	Lynn Garner	Jr
LB	86	Mike Jacobs	Jr
DE	85	Bruce James	So
DL	72	Rick Kersey	So
DT	71	Gordon McNulty	So
DB	18	Jerry Moore	So
LB	51	Guy Parker	Jr
DT	68	Terry Don Phillips	Jr
LB	64	Cliff Powell	Jr
DB	24	Terry Stewart	Jr

Special teams

Pos.	#	Name	Class
K	83	Tim Webster	So

Head coach

- Frank Broyles

Coordinators/assistant coaches

- Hootie Ingram
  (Defensive backs coach)

Legend

- (C) Team captain
- (S) Suspended
- (I) Ineligible
- Injured
- Redshirt

== Sugar Bowl ==
	1	2	3	4	Total
Razorbacks	0	10	0	6	16
Bulldogs	0	2	0	0	2

Georgia's number-one ranked defense matched up against Arkansas ninth-ranked offense on New Year's Day in New Orleans.

Razorback QB Bill Montgomery led the only scoring drive, capped with a 23-yard strike to Chuck Dicus. Georgia responded with David McKnight tackling Razorback Bill Burnett in the end zone for a safety, after which Razorback kicker Bob White took over, adding three unanswered field goals. The game ended with a 16–2 Razorback win. Chuck Dicus caught twelve passes for 169 yards and a score, and was named player of the game.

Scoring summary

Quarter	Time	Drive			Team	Scoring information	Score	
Quarter	Time	Plays	Yards	TOP	Team	Scoring information	ARK	UGA
2			65		ARK	Chuck Dicus 27-yard touchdown reception from Bill Montgomery, Bob White kick good	7	0
2					UGA	Bill Burnett tackled in end zone for a safety by David McKnight	7	2
2			71		ARK	34-yard field goal by Bob White	10	2
4			55		ARK	24-yard field goal by Bob White	13	2
4			15		ARK	31-yard field goal by Bob White	16	2
"TOP" = time of possession. For other American football terms, see Glossary of American football.							16	2
