= 1968 Texas Longhorns football team =

American college football season

1968 Texas Longhorns football

SWC co-champion Cotton Bowl Classic champion

Cotton Bowl Classic, W 36–13 vs. Tennessee
- Conference: Southwest Conference

Ranking
- Coaches: No. 5
- AP: No. 3
- Record: 9–1–1 (6–1 SWC)
- Head coach: Darrell Royal (12th season)
- Offensive coordinator: Emory Bellard (1st season)
- Offensive scheme: I-formation (first two games); Wishbone (last nine games)
- Defensive coordinator: Mike Campbell (2nd season)
- Base defense: 4–4
- Home stadium: Memorial Stadium

1968 Southwest Conference football standings
	Conf.					Overall
Team	W		L		T	W		L		T
No. 6 Arkansas +	6	–	1	–	0	10	–	1	–	0
No. 3 Texas +	6	–	1	–	0	9	–	1	–	1
No. 14 SMU	5	–	2	–	0	8	–	3	–	0
Texas Tech	4	–	3	–	0	5	–	3	–	2
Baylor	3	–	4	–	0	3	–	7	–	0
Texas A&M	2	–	5	–	0	3	–	7	–	0
TCU	2	–	5	–	0	3	–	7	–	0
Rice	0	–	7	–	0	0	–	9	–	1
+ – Conference co-champions; Rankings from AP Poll

The 1968 Texas Longhorns football team was an American football team that represented the University of Texas at Austin as a member of the Southwest Conference (SWC) during the 1968 NCAA University Division football season. In their 12th year under head coach Darrell Royal, the Longhorns compiled an overall record of 9–1–1, with a mark of 6–1 in conference play, and finished as SWC co-champion. Texas concluded their season with a victory over Tennessee in the Cotton Bowl Classic.

== Schedule ==
Date	Time	Opponent	Rank	Site	TV	Result	Attendance	Source
September 21	7:30 p.m.	No. 11 Houston*	No. 4	Memorial Stadium; Austin, TX		T 20–20	66,397	
September 28	7:30 p.m.	at Texas Tech	No. 6	Jones Stadium; Lubbock, TX (rivalry)		L 22–31	50,167	
October 5	7:30 p.m.	Oklahoma State*		Memorial Stadium; Austin, TX		W 31–3	51,000	
October 12	2:00 p.m.	vs. Oklahoma*		Cotton Bowl; Dallas, TX (rivalry)		W 26–20	71,938	
October 19	2:00 p.m.	No. 9 Arkansas	No. 17	Memorial Stadium; Austin, TX (rivalry)		W 39–29	66,397	
October 26	7:30 p.m.	at Rice	No. 13	Rice Stadium; Houston, TX (rivalry)		W 38–14	68,500	
November 2	2:00 p.m.	No. 13 SMU	No. 11	Memorial Stadium; Austin, TX		W 38–7	66,397	
November 9	2:00 p.m.	at Baylor	No. 10	Baylor Stadium; Waco, TX (rivalry)		W 47–26	33,000	
November 16	1:00 p.m.	at TCU	No. 8	Amon G. Carter Stadium; Fort Worth, TX (rivalry)		W 47–21	40,000	
November 28	2:00 p.m.	Texas A&M	No. 6	Memorial Stadium; Austin, TX (rivalry)	ABC	W 35–14	66,397	
January 1	1:30 p.m.	vs. No. 8 Tennessee*	No. 5	Cotton Bowl; Dallas, TX (Cotton Bowl Classic)	CBS	W 36–13	72,000	
*Non-conference game; Rankings from AP Poll released prior to the game; All times are in Central time

== Roster ==
1968 Texas Longhorns football team roster
Players
Coaches
Offense

Pos.	#	Name	Class
QB	18	Bill Bradley	Sr
G	66	Mike Dean	So
RB	25	Chris Gilbert	Sr
RB	24	Ted Koy	Jr
OT	62	Bob McKay	Jr
G	64	Bobby Mitchell	So
TE	40	Randy Peschel	Jr
WR	88	Cotton Speyrer	So
QB	16	James Street	Jr
C	52	Forrest Wiegand	Jr
FB	30	Steve Worster	So
OT	50	Bobby Wuensch	So

Defense

Pos.	#	Name	Class
DE	77	Bill Atessis	So
DT	71	Leo Brooks	Jr
ROV	86	Mike Campbell	Jr
CB	84	Tom Campbell	Jr
ILB	67	Glen Halsell	Jr
ILB	61	Scott Henderson	So
CB	23	Danny Lester	So
OLB	82	Corby Robertson	Sr
S	28	Freddie Steinmark	So
DB	41	Dick Watt	Sr
OLB	80	Bill Zapalac	So

Special teams

Pos.	#	Name	Class

Head coach

- Darrell Royal

Coordinators/assistant coaches

- Emory Bellard
- Mike Campbell
- Willie Zapalac

Legend

- (C) Team captain
- (S) Suspended
- (I) Ineligible
- Injured
- Redshirt

== Awards and honors ==
- James Street, quarterback, Cotton Bowl co-Most Valuable Player
- Cotton Speyrer, wide receiver, Cotton Bowl co-Most Valuable Player
- Tom Campbell, linebacker, Cotton Bowl co-Most Valuable Player
- Chris Gilbert, back, Consensus All-American
