= 1968 Washington Huskies football team =

American college football season

1968 Washington Huskies football
- Conference: Pacific-8 Conference
- Record: 3–5–2 (1–5–1 Pac-8)
- Head coach: Jim Owens (12th season)
- Captains: Jim Cope; Al Worley
- Home stadium: University of Washington Stadium

1968 Pacific-8 Conference football standings
	Conf.					Overall
Team	W		L		T	W		L		T
No. 4 USC $	6	–	0	–	0	9	–	1	–	1
No. 15 Oregon State	5	–	1	–	0	7	–	3	–	0
Stanford	3	–	3	–	1	6	–	3	–	1
California	2	–	2	–	1	7	–	3	–	1
Oregon	2	–	4	–	0	4	–	6	–	0
UCLA	2	–	4	–	0	3	–	7	–	0
Washington State	1	–	3	–	1	3	–	6	–	1
Washington	1	–	5	–	1	3	–	5	–	2
$ – Conference champion; Rankings from AP Poll

The 1968 Washington Huskies football team was an American football team that represented the University of Washington during the 1968 NCAA University Division football season. Led by twelfth-year head coach Jim Owens, the Huskies compiled a 3–5–2 record (1–5–1 in the Pacific-8 Conference, last) and were outscored 177 to 154.

Halfback Jim Cope and cornerback Al Worley were the team captains.

This was the first season of AstroTurf at University of Washington Stadium; the opener was a tie with Rice. It was one of four venues in the University Division with artificial turf in 1968; the others were the Astrodome (Houston), Neyland Stadium (Tennessee), and Camp Randall Stadium (Wisconsin).

== Schedule ==
Date	Opponent	Site	TV	Result	Attendance	Source
September 21	Rice*	University of Washington Stadium; Seattle, WA		T 35–35	50,038	
September 28	at Wisconsin*	Camp Randall Stadium; Madison, WI		W 21–17	42,965	
October 5	at Oregon State	Parker Stadium; Corvallis, OR	ABC	L 21–35	30,220	
October 12	Oregon	University of Washington Stadium; Seattle, WA (rivalry)		L 0–3	52,737	
October 19	at No. 1 USC	Los Angeles Memorial Coliseum; Los Angeles, CA		L 7–14	60,990	
October 26	Idaho*	University of Washington Stadium; Seattle, WA		W 37–7	49,538	
November 2	No. 8 California	University of Washington Stadium; Seattle, WA		T 7–7	50,266	
November 9	at Stanford	Stanford Stadium; Stanford, CA		L 20–35	33,000	
November 16	UCLA	University of Washington Stadium; Seattle, WA		W 6–0	52,500	
November 23	vs. Washington State	Joe Albi Stadium; Spokane, WA (Apple Cup)		L 0–24	31,986	
*Non-conference game; Rankings from AP Poll released prior to the game

== Roster ==
1968 Washington Huskies football team roster
Players
Coaches
Offense

Pos.	#	Name	Class
G	61	Ken Ballenger	Jr
RB	29	Harvey Blanks	Jr
FB	31	Dave Cooke	Jr
RB	28	Jim Cope (C)	Sr
RB	32	Bo Cornell	So
G	60	Jim Harris	Jr
SE	89	Jeff Huget	Sr
TE	86	Ernie Janet	So
C	53	Bruce Jarvis	So
QB	7	Jerry Kaloper	Sr
OT	76	Dave McClinton	Sr
QB	17	Mike McCoy	Jr
OT	54	Bob Schoepper	Sr
OT	75	Avery Schwartz	Jr
QB	14	Gene Willis	So
RB	39	Carl Wojciechowski	Sr
SE	92	Harrison Wood	Sr

Defense

Pos.	#	Name	Class
DT	72	Bob Anderson	Sr
DB	18	Bob Berg	Jr
DT	87	Lee Brock	Jr
DT	78	Greg Fike	So
LB	49	George Jugum	Sr
DE	84	Ken Lee	So
DT	70	Rick Sharp	Sr
DB	11	Dan Spriesterbach	Sr
DB	13	Bill Sprinkle	Sr
LB	50	Mark Truner	So
DB	35	Tom Verti	Jr
DE	98	Otis Washington	Sr
LB	36	Clyde Werner	Jr
DB	12	Al Worley (C)	Sr

Special teams

Pos.	#	Name	Class
P	89	Jeff Huget	Sr
PK	10	Ron Volbrecht	So
P	14	Gene Willis	So

Head coach

- Jim Owens (12th year)

Coordinators/assistant coaches

- Tom Tipps
- Bob Schloredt
- Jerry Cheek
- Otto Kofler
- Don White
- John Goodwin
- Jack Friedman
- Dave Phillips
- Mel Thompson

Legend

- (C) Team captain
- (S) Suspended
- (I) Ineligible
- Injured
- Redshirt

== NFL/AFL draft selections ==
Two University of Washington Huskies were selected in the 1969 NFL/AFL draft, which lasted 17 rounds with 442 selections.

= Husky Hall of Fame

Player	Position	Round	Overall	Franchise
Harrison Wood	Wide receiver	8th	199	Minnesota Vikings
George Jugum	Linebacker	15th	385	Los Angeles Rams
