= 1968 California Golden Bears football team =

American college football season

1968 California Golden Bears football
- Conference: Pacific-8 Conference
- Record: 7–3–1 (2–2–1 Pac-8)
- Head coach: Ray Willsey (5th season)
- Home stadium: California Memorial Stadium

1968 Pacific-8 Conference football standings
	Conf.					Overall
Team	W		L		T	W		L		T
No. 4 USC $	6	–	0	–	0	9	–	1	–	1
No. 15 Oregon State	5	–	1	–	0	7	–	3	–	0
Stanford	3	–	3	–	1	6	–	3	–	1
California	2	–	2	–	1	7	–	3	–	1
Oregon	2	–	4	–	0	4	–	6	–	0
UCLA	2	–	4	–	0	3	–	7	–	0
Washington State	1	–	3	–	1	3	–	6	–	1
Washington	1	–	5	–	1	3	–	5	–	2
$ – Conference champion; Rankings from AP Poll

The 1968 California Golden Bears football team was an American football team that represented the University of California, Berkeley in the Pacific-8 Conference (Pac-8) during the 1968 NCAA University Division football season. In their fifth year under head coach Ray Willsey, the Golden Bears compiled a 7–3–1 record (2–2–1 in Pac-8, fourth) and outscored their opponents 243 to 114. Home games were played on campus at California Memorial Stadium in Berkeley, California.

This year's team came to be known as "The Bear Minimum", led by defensive lineman Ed White, an All-American and future member of College Hall of Fame. Relying on its defense, Cal ranked as high as eighth in the AP poll in early November. The Bears won 21–7 at Michigan in the season opener and shut out No. 10 Syracuse 43–0 in late October. Earning three shutouts, California held its opponents to 10.4 points a game. As of 2011, The Bear Minimum still held Cal's records for opponents' average gains per play – 3.60, as well as the fewest rushing touchdowns per season – five (same as the 1937 "Thunder Team"). Its average yards per rush was 2.51 which is still second only to the "Thunder Team" with 2.50 yards per rush.

California's statistical leaders on offense were quarterback Randy Humphries with 1,247 passing yards, Gary Fowler with 665 rushing yards, and Wayne Stewart with 679 receiving yards.

== Schedule ==
Date	Opponent	Rank	Site	TV	Result	Attendance	Source
September 21	at Michigan*		Michigan Stadium; Ann Arbor, MI		W 21–7	71,386	
September 28	Colorado*		California Memorial Stadium; Berkeley, CA	ABC	W 10–0	37,500	
October 5	San Jose State*	No. 18	California Memorial Stadium; Berkeley, CA		W 46–0	25,000	
October 12	at Army*	No. 16	Michie Stadium; West Point, NY		L 7–10	32,000	
October 19	UCLA		California Memorial Stadium; Berkeley, CA (rivalry)		W 39–15	48,000	
October 26	No. 10 Syracuse*	No. 11	California Memorial Stadium; Berkeley, CA		W 43–0	50,000	
November 2	at Washington	No. 8	University of Washington Stadium; Seattle, WA		T 7–7	50,266	
November 9	at No. 1 USC	No. 11	Los Angeles Memorial Coliseum; Los Angeles, CA		L 17–35	80,871	
November 16	Oregon	No. 18	California Memorial Stadium; Berkeley, CA		W 36–8	28,000	
November 23	Stanford	No. 18	California Memorial Stadium; Berkeley, CA (Big Game)		L 0–20	75,000	
November 30	at Hawaii*		Honolulu Stadium; Honolulu, HI		W 17–12	19,042	
*Non-conference game; Rankings from AP Poll released prior to the game

== Roster ==
1968 California Golden Bears football team roster
Players
Coaches
Offense

Pos.	#	Name	Class
TE	84	Jim Brady	So
G	55	Gerald Borgia	Jr
G	65	Jerome Champion	Jr
RB	40	Gary Fowler	Jr
TE	85	George Harris	Jr
QB	13	Randy Humphries	Jr
C	51	Bill Laveroni	Jr
FB	83	John McGaffie	Sr
OT	77	Mike Meers	Jr
QB	15	Dave Penhall	So
TE	83	John Phillips	Jr
OT	78	Bob Richards	Sr
G	66	Dan Ryan	Jr
WR	90	Wayne Stewart	Sr
WR	21	Paul Williams	Sr

Defense

Pos.	#	Name	Class
DE	66	Irby Augustine	Jr
LB	50	Phil Croyle	So
DT	67	Mark Hultgren	Jr
DB	38	Gordie Johnson	Jr
DB	42	Eric Kastner	Jr
DE	89	Mike McCaffrey	Sr
LB	56	Dennis Pitta	Sr
DT	72	Larry Reis	Sr
DL	73	Steve Schultz	Jr
DB	35	Jim Sheridan	Jr
DL	70	Ed White	Sr
DB	18	Ken Wiedemann	Jr
LB	53	Jerry Woods	Sr

Special teams

Pos.	#	Name	Class

Head coach

- Ray Willsey

Coordinators/assistant coaches

Legend

- (C) Team captain
- (S) Suspended
- (I) Ineligible
- Injured
- Redshirt
