= 1968 Baylor Bears football team =

American college football season

1968 Baylor Bears football
- Conference: Southwest Conference
- Record: 3–7 (3–4 SWC)
- Head coach: John Bridgers (10th season)
- Captains: Jackie Allen; Pinkie Palmer
- Home stadium: Baylor Stadium

1968 Southwest Conference football standings
	Conf.					Overall
Team	W		L		T	W		L		T
No. 6 Arkansas +	6	–	1	–	0	10	–	1	–	0
No. 3 Texas +	6	–	1	–	0	9	–	1	–	1
No. 14 SMU	5	–	2	–	0	8	–	3	–	0
Texas Tech	4	–	3	–	0	5	–	3	–	2
Baylor	3	–	4	–	0	3	–	7	–	0
Texas A&M	2	–	5	–	0	3	–	7	–	0
TCU	2	–	5	–	0	3	–	7	–	0
Rice	0	–	7	–	0	0	–	9	–	1
+ – Conference co-champions; Rankings from AP Poll

The 1968 Baylor Bears football team represented Baylor University (Waco, Texas) in the Southwest Conference (SWC) during the 1968 NCAA University Division football season. In their tenth and final season under head coach John Bridgers, the Bears compiled a 3–7 record (3–4 against conference opponents), finished in fifth place in the conference, and were outscored by opponents by a combined total of 322 to 206. They played their home games at Baylor Stadium in Waco, Texas.

The team's statistical leaders included Steve Stuart with 1,320 passing yards, Pinkie Palmer with 818 rushing yards, Jerry Smith with 509 receiving yards, and Gene Rogers and Pinkie Palmer with 36 points scored each. Jackie Allen and Pinkie Palmer were the team captains.

== Schedule ==
Date	Opponent	Site	Result	Attendance	Source
September 21	at No. 15 Indiana*	Seventeenth Street Stadium; Bloomington, IN	L 36–40	44,382	
September 28	at Michigan State*	Spartan Stadium; East Lansing, MI	L 10–28	64,826	
October 5	at No. 10 LSU*	Tiger Stadium; Baton Rouge, LA	L 16–48	67,931	
October 12	at No. 14 Arkansas	Razorback Stadium; Fayetteville, AR	L 19–35	41,429	
October 26	Texas A&M^{†}	Baylor Stadium; Waco, TX (rivalry)	W 10–9	40,000	
November 2	at TCU	Amon G. Carter Stadium; Fort Worth, TX (rivalry)	L 14–47	23,078	
November 9	No. 10 Texas	Baylor Stadium; Waco, TX (rivalry)	L 26–47	33,000	
November 16	Texas Tech	Baylor Stadium; Waco, TX (rivalry)	W 42–28	20,000	
November 23	at SMU	Cotton Bowl; Dallas, TX	L 17–33	22,000	
November 30	Rice	Baylor Stadium; Waco, TX	W 16–7	4,000	
*Non-conference game; ^{†}Homecoming; Rankings from AP Poll released prior to the game

== Roster ==
1968 Baylor Bears football team roster
Players			Coaches
Offense: Pos. / # / Name / Class; QB / 17 / Alvin Flynn	Defense: Pos. / # / Name / Class; S / 21 / Jackie Allen	Special teams: Pos. / # / Name / Class	Head coach: John Bridgers; Coordinators/assistant coaches Legend: (C) Team captain; (S) Suspended; (I) Ineligible; Injured; Redshirt
