= Bill Meek =

American football player and coach (1920–1998)

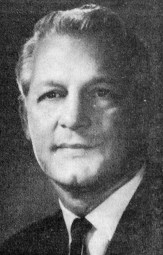

Biographical details
- Born: August 14, 1920; Waterbury, Connecticut, U.S.
- Died: May 28, 1998 (aged 77); Dallas, Texas, U.S.

Playing career
- 1940–1942: Tennessee
- 1943: 300th Infantry
- Position: Quarterback

Coaching career (HC unless noted)
- 1945: Fort Benning
- 1947–1950: Maryland (backfield)
- 1951–1954: Kansas State
- 1955–1956: Houston
- 1957–1961: SMU
- 1966–1967: Army (OC)
- 1968–1973: Utah

Head coaching record
- Overall: 81–93–7

Accomplishments and honors

Championships
- 1 MVC (1956)

Awards
- WAC Coach of the Year (1969); MVC Coach of the Year (1956)

William Meridas Meek (August 14, 1920 – May 28, 1998) was an American football player and coach. He served as the head football coach at Kansas State University from 1951 to 1954, the University of Houston from 1955 to 1956, Southern Methodist University (SMU) from 1957 to 1961), and the University of Utah from 1968 to 1973.

== Early life ==
Meek was born in Waterbury, Connecticut, to Joseph A. Meek and Josephine E. Gaudiosi. His paternal grandmother was born in Germany, while his maternal grandparents emigrated from Italy. His family moved to Birmingham, Alabama, in his youth. In college, he earned three letters playing as a back-up quarterback for the University of Tennessee; he graduated in 1943.

== Coaching career ==
Meek had his first head coaching experience at age 22, with the Fort Benning Doughboy football club in 1944, while serving in the Army during World War II. Most of the starters on the team were members of the great Army teams of the early 1940s, and the team defeated all opponents except for a 0–7 loss to Auburn University. Marty Blake, later the NBA director of scouting, was one of the team managers. Following the war, Meek left the Army with the rank of captain.

Meek served as an assistant football coach throughout the remainder of the 1940s. From 1947 to 1950, he coached under Jim Tatum at the University of Maryland. During his tenure there, Meek was credited with the development of backs Ed Modzelewski and Bob Shemonski.

In 1951, Meek was offered his first collegiate head coaching position at Kansas State University with an initial salary of $8,000. Meek was offered the job even though he told the hiring committee at Kansas State that the program was in disarray. His first season, he posted a 1–7–1 record, typical for Kansas State at the time. When he learned after the season that an ineligible player had participated, he self-reported the violation to the NCAA, and the school voluntarily forfeited the win and the tie. The following season, the squad went 1–9. Meek accepted the services of several former Army players who resigned from the academy after violating the honor code in 1951. In 1953, Kansas State posted a 6–3–1 record, the first winning season at the school since Wes Fry's 1936 team. After starting that season 5–1, K-State also received its first national ranking, at #18 in the Coaches Poll on October 28, 1953. The following year was even better, with Kansas State posting a 7–3 record and playing for an Orange Bowl berth in their final game (they went on to lose at Colorado). Meek left Kansas State following the 1954 season, when the school refused to give raises to his assistants. Kansas State wouldn't have another winning record for 16 years.

In January 1955, Meek took over as the head coach at the University of Houston. In two years at Houston, from 1955 to 1956, Meek compiled a 13–6–1 record. During his second season, Meek led the Cougars to the Missouri Valley Conference championship and was named the Missouri Valley Coach of the Year.

In 1957, Meek took the job as head coach of the SMU Mustangs. During his tenure, from 1957 to 1961, he compiled a 17–29–4 record, while coaching All-American quarterback Don Meredith. By far his worst season at SMU was 1960, when his team went 0–9–1, with the only game decided by less than 10 points being a 0–0 tie with Texas A&M.

From 1962 to 1967, Meek worked as an assistant coach, including stints as Director of Pro Personnel for the Denver Broncos and as a scout for the Dallas Cowboys. Meek was offensive coordinator for Army during the 1966 and 1967 seasons.

Meek took his final coaching job in 1968, as head coach at the University of Utah in Salt Lake City. He guided the WAC team to a 33–31 record in six seasons, and his 1969 team posted an 8–2 record. Six weeks after the Utes' 1973 season ended, Meek resigned in January 1974. and assistant coach Tom Lovat, an alumnus, was promoted.

== Death ==
Meek died on May 28, 1998.

== Head coaching record ==
Year	Team	Overall	Conference	Standing
Fort Benning Doughboys (Independent) (1945)
1945	Fort Benning	4–3–1 (Note: Archie Milano was for Benning's head coach for the first two games of the 1945 season before he was discharged from the Army in October. He was succeeded by Meek. Fort Benning finished the season with a record of 5–4–1.)		
Fort Benning:		4–3–1		
Kansas State Wildcats (Big Seven Conference) (1951–1954)
1951	Kansas State	0–9*	0–6*	7th
1952	Kansas State	1–9	0–6	7th
1953	Kansas State	6–3–1	4–2	T–2nd
1954	Kansas State	7–3	3–3	5th
Kansas State:		14–24–1	7–17	
Houston Cougars (Missouri Valley Conference) (1955–1956)
1955	Houston	6–4	2–2	3rd
1956	Houston	7–2–1	4–0	1st
Houston:		13–6–1	6–2	
SMU Mustangs (Southwest Conference) (1957–1961)
1957	SMU	4–5–1	3–3	4th
1958	SMU	6–4	4–2	T–2nd
1959	SMU	5–4–1	2–3–1	4th
1960	SMU	0–9–1	0–6–1	8th
1961	SMU	2–7–1	1–5–1	8th
SMU:		17–29–4	10–19–3	
Utah Utes (Western Athletic Conference) (1968–1973)
1968	Utah	3–7	2–3	5th
1969	Utah	8–2	5–1	2nd
1970	Utah	6–4	4–2	3rd
1971	Utah	3–8	3–4	T–4th
1972	Utah	6–5	5–2	T–2nd
1973	Utah	7–5	4–2	3rd
Utah:		33–31	23–14	
Total:		81–93–7		
National championship Conference title Conference division title or championship game berth

*1951 season record reflects voluntary forfeits by the school.
