= 1968 UCLA Bruins football team =

American college football season

1968 UCLA Bruins football
- Conference: Pacific-8 Conference
- Record: 3–7 (2–4 Pac-8)
- Head coach: Tommy Prothro (4th season)
- Home stadium: Los Angeles Memorial Coliseum

1968 Pacific-8 Conference football standings
	Conf.					Overall
Team	W		L		T	W		L		T
No. 4 USC $	6	–	0	–	0	9	–	1	–	1
No. 15 Oregon State	5	–	1	–	0	7	–	3	–	0
Stanford	3	–	3	–	1	6	–	3	–	1
California	2	–	2	–	1	7	–	3	–	1
Oregon	2	–	4	–	0	4	–	6	–	0
UCLA	2	–	4	–	0	3	–	7	–	0
Washington State	1	–	3	–	1	3	–	6	–	1
Washington	1	–	5	–	1	3	–	5	–	2
$ – Conference champion; Rankings from AP Poll

The 1968 UCLA Bruins football team was an American football team that represented the University of California, Los Angeles during the 1968 NCAA University Division football season. In their fourth year under head coach Tommy Prothro, the Bruins compiled a 3–7 record (2–4 Pac-8) and finished in a tie for fifth place in the Pacific-8 Conference.

UCLA's offensive leaders in 1968 were quarterback Jim Nader with 1,008 passing yards, running back Greg Jones with 497 rushing yards, and Ron Copeland with 372 receiving yards.

In a rebuilding year, the Bruins opened with two home wins: a 63–7 defeat of Pittsburgh, featuring a school-record 4 TD passes by QB Nader, relieving an injured starter Bill Bolden, and a ten-point win over Washington State. The season ground to a halt at Syracuse, and with QB Bolden in and out of the lineup due to injuries the rest of the season, plus several other starters eventually sidelined as well, UCLA won only once more, over Stanford 20–17.

The Bruins gave #1 USC and Heisman Trophy winner O. J. Simpson a scare in a 28–16 loss; UCLA, a near 2-TD underdog at the fog-shrouded Coliseum, trailed 21–16 deep into the fourth quarter and moved inside of USC's 5-yard line behind QB Nader before being stopped. A subsequent turnover near midfield set up a late Trojan drive for the clinching TD by Simpson with only 25 seconds to play. Though the brave effort vs. the top-ranked Trojans fueled optimism for the subsequent and successful 1969 season.

== Schedule ==
Date	Opponent	Rank	Site	Result	Attendance	Source
September 5	Pittsburgh*	No. 16	Los Angeles Memorial Coliseum; Los Angeles, CA	W 63–7	43,218	
September 28	Washington State	No. 8	Los Angeles Memorial Coliseum; Los Angeles, CA	W 31–21	41,759	
October 5	at Syracuse*	No. 9	Archbold Stadium; Syracuse, NY	L 7–20	37,367	
October 12	No. 3 Penn State*		Los Angeles Memorial Coliseum; Los Angeles, CA	L 6–21	35,778	
October 19	at California		California Memorial Stadium; Berkeley, CA (rivalry)	L 15–39	48,000	
October 26	Stanford		Los Angeles Memorial Coliseum; Los Angeles, CA	W 20–17	37,935	
November 2	at No. 5 Tennessee*		Neyland Stadium; Knoxville, TN	L 18–42	64,078	
November 9	at No. 15 Oregon State		Parker Stadium; Corvallis, OR	L 21–45	41,361	
November 16	at Washington		Husky Stadium; Seattle, WA	L 0–6	52,500	
November 23	No. 1 USC		Los Angeles Memorial Coliseum; Los Angeles, CA (Victory Bell)	L 16–28	75,066	
*Non-conference game; Rankings from AP Poll released prior to the game

== Roster ==
1968 UCLA Bruins football team roster
Players
Coaches
Offense

Pos.	#	Name	Class
QB		Bill Bolden
WR	88	Ron Copeland
WR	85	George Farmer
RB	43	Greg Jones
QB		Jim Nader	So

Defense

Pos.	#	Name	Class
LB	57	Mike Ballou
DT	93	Bob Geddes
DT	89	Wes Grant

Special teams

Pos.	#	Name	Class
K	7	Zenon Andrusyshyn

Head coach

- Tommy Prothro (4th year)

Coordinators/assistant coaches

Legend

- (C) Team captain
- (S) Suspended
- (I) Ineligible
- Injured
- Redshirt
