= 1968 SMU Mustangs football team =

American college football season

1968 SMU Mustangs football

Astro-Bluebonnet Bowl champion

Astro-Bluebonnet Bowl, W 28–27 vs. Oklahoma
- Conference: Southwest Conference

Ranking
- Coaches: No. 16
- AP: No. 14
- Record: 8–3 (5–2 SWC)
- Head coach: Hayden Fry (7th season)
- Home stadium: Ownby Stadium

1968 Southwest Conference football standings
	Conf.					Overall
Team	W		L		T	W		L		T
No. 6 Arkansas +	6	–	1	–	0	10	–	1	–	0
No. 3 Texas +	6	–	1	–	0	9	–	1	–	1
No. 14 SMU	5	–	2	–	0	8	–	3	–	0
Texas Tech	4	–	3	–	0	5	–	3	–	2
Baylor	3	–	4	–	0	3	–	7	–	0
Texas A&M	2	–	5	–	0	3	–	7	–	0
TCU	2	–	5	–	0	3	–	7	–	0
Rice	0	–	7	–	0	0	–	9	–	1
+ – Conference co-champions; Rankings from AP Poll

The 1968 SMU Mustangs football team represented Southern Methodist University (SMU) as a member of the Southwest Conference (SWC) during the 1968 NCAA University Division football season. Led by seventh-year head coach Hayden Fry, the Mustangs compiled an overall record of 8–3 with a conference mark of 5–2, placing third in the SWC. SMU was invited to the Astro-Bluebonnet Bowl, where they upset number 10 Oklahoma.

== Schedule ==
Date	Opponent	Rank	Site	Result	Attendance	Source
September 21	at Auburn*		Cliff Hare Stadium; Auburn, AL	W 37–28	40,606	
September 28	at No. 11 Ohio State*		Ohio Stadium; Columbus, OH	L 14–35	73,855	
October 5	NC State*		Cotton Bowl; Dallas, TX	W 35–14	38,000	
October 12	at TCU		Amon G. Carter Stadium; Fort Worth, TX (rivalry)	W 21–14	31,542	
October 19	Rice		Cotton Bowl; Dallas, TX (rivalry)	W 32–24	25,000	
October 26	at No. 19 Texas Tech		Jones Stadium; Lubbock, TX	W 39–18	50,352	
November 2	at No. 11 Texas	No. 13	Memorial Stadium; Austin, TX	L 7–38	66,397	
November 9	Texas A&M		Cotton Bowl; Dallas, TX	W 36–23	42,000	
November 16	at No. 10 Arkansas		War Memorial Stadium; Little Rock, AR	L 29–35	49,112	
November 23	Baylor		Cotton Bowl; Dallas, TX	W 33–17	22,000	
December 31	vs. No. 10 Oklahoma	No. 20	Houston Astrodome; Houston, TX (Astro-Bluebonett Bowl)	W 28–27	55,453	
*Non-conference game; Rankings from AP Poll released prior to the game

== Roster ==
1968 SMU Mustangs football team roster
Players
Coaches
Offense

Pos.	#	Name	Class
G	61	Que Brittain	Jr
QB	11	Gary Carter	So
FB	22	Pinky Clements	Sr
TE	85	Ken Fleming	So
QB	10	Chuck Hixson	So
WR	81	Sam Holden	Jr
OT	76	Bill Jackson	So
E	84	John Jordan	So
WR	23	Jerry LeVias	Sr
OT	72	Terry May	Sr
G	68	Kemp McMillan	Jr
C	57	Stan Poulos	Jr
RB	24	Mike Richardson	Sr

Defense

Pos.	#	Name	Class
LB	32	Mike Armstrong	Jr
DL	56	Rufus Cormier	Jr
DL	50	R. D. Crenshaw	Sr
S	47	Daryl Doggett	Jr
DE	94	Tommy Fraser	Jr
DT	62	Jim Johnston	So
DT	63	Bill Line	So
DB	40	Jimmy Livingston	Sr
DE	89	Mike Mitchell	Sr
DB	45	Mike Nekuza	So
LB	38	Bruce Portillo	Jr
DE	88	Jim Shaw	Jr
LB	31	Joe Stutts	So
DB	41	Larry Tunnell	So
DT	69	Bill Wright	So

Special teams

Pos.	#	Name	Class

Head coach

- Hayden Fry

Coordinators/assistant coaches

Legend

- (C) Team captain
- (S) Suspended
- (I) Ineligible
- Injured
- Redshirt

== Team players drafted into the NFL ==
Player	Position	Round	Pick	NFL club
Jerry LeVias	Wide receiver	2	40	Houston Oilers
Mike Richardson (running back, born 1946)	Running back	7	171	Houston Oilers
Terry May	Center	11	274	Houston Oilers

== Awards and honors ==
- Chuck Hixson, Sammy Baugh Trophy
