= 1968 Oregon Ducks football team =

American college football season

1968 Oregon Ducks football
- Conference: Pacific-8 Conference
- Record: 4–6 (2–4 Pac-8)
- Head coach: Jerry Frei (2nd season)
- Captains: George Dames; Omri Hildreth
- Home stadium: Autzen Stadium (natural grass)

1968 Pacific-8 Conference football standings
	Conf.					Overall
Team	W		L		T	W		L		T
No. 4 USC $	6	–	0	–	0	9	–	1	–	1
No. 15 Oregon State	5	–	1	–	0	7	–	3	–	0
Stanford	3	–	3	–	1	6	–	3	–	1
California	2	–	2	–	1	7	–	3	–	1
Oregon	2	–	4	–	0	4	–	6	–	0
UCLA	2	–	4	–	0	3	–	7	–	0
Washington State	1	–	3	–	1	3	–	6	–	1
Washington	1	–	5	–	1	3	–	5	–	2
$ – Conference champion; Rankings from AP Poll

The 1968 Oregon Ducks football team represented the University of Oregon during the 1968 NCAA University Division football season. All five home games were played on campus in Eugene at Autzen Stadium, which opened the previous year.

Under second-year head coach Jerry Frei, the Ducks were 4–6 overall and 2–4 in the Pacific-8 Conference. Oregon did not play UCLA for the tenth consecutive season, but tormented top-ranked USC deep into the fourth quarter; a late touchdown broke a tie and the Trojans escaped with a 20–13 win at Autzen in early November.

It was USC's first-ever trip to Eugene; previous games had been at Multnomah Stadium in Portland, last in 1958. Senior running back O. J. Simpson rushed for 980 yards in the Trojans' first five games (196 avg.), but the Ducks held him to just 67 yards on 25 carries. He had been similarly contained by Oregon the previous year in Los Angeles. Simpson won the Heisman Trophy later in the month and was the first overall pick in the 1969 NFL/AFL draft in late January.

Oregon opened with three losses, evened up at .500 after six, but lost three of the last four. They defeated both Washington schools, but in the season-ending Civil War at Parker Stadium in Corvallis, No. 16 Oregon State won their fifth straight in the rivalry. It was the last in the series played on natural grass, as both schools installed AstroTurf before the next season.

== Schedule ==
Date	Opponent	Site	Result	Attendance	Source
September 21	at Colorado*	Folsom Field; Boulder, CO	L 7–28	44,723	
September 28	Stanford	Autzen Stadium; Eugene, OR	L 12–28	25,000	
October 5	at No. 6 Ohio State*	Ohio Stadium; Columbus, OH	L 6–21	70,191	
October 12	at Washington	Husky Stadium; Seattle, WA (rivalry)	W 3–0	52,500	
October 19	Idaho*	Autzen Stadium; Eugene, OR	W 23–8	17,250	
October 26	Utah*	Autzen Stadium; Eugene, OR	W 14–6	17,000	
November 2	No. 1 USC	Autzen Stadium; Eugene, OR	L 13–20	33,500	
November 9	Washington State^{†}	Autzen Stadium; Eugene, OR	W 27–13	23,000	
November 16	at No. 18 California	California Memorial Stadium; Berkeley, CA	L 8–36	28,000	
November 23	at No. 16 Oregon State	Parker Stadium; Corvallis, OR (Civil War)	L 19–41	40,141	
*Non-conference game; ^{†}Homecoming; Rankings from AP Poll released prior to the game

== Roster ==
1968 Oregon Ducks football team roster
Players
Coaches
Offense

Pos.	#	Name	Class
QB	17	Tom Blanchard	So
RB/G	44	Andy Maurer
WR	81	Bob Newland	So
RB	22	Claxton Welch

Defense

Pos.	#	Name	Class

Special teams

Pos.	#	Name	Class

Head coach

- Jerry Frei (2nd year)

Coordinators/assistant coaches

Legend

- (C) Team captain
- (S) Suspended
- (I) Ineligible
- Injured
- Redshirt
