= Archie Milano =

American football player (1918–1991)

No. 51
- Position: End

Personal information
- Born: May 26, 1918; Long Island City, New York, U.S.
- Died: August 12, 1991; Columbus, Georgia, U.S.
- Listed height: 6 ft 0 in (1.83 m)
- Listed weight: 197 lb (89 kg)

Career information
- College: Saint Francis (PA)

Career history

Playing
- Detroit Lions (1945)

Coaching
- Fort Benning (1945) Head coach

Archie J. Milano (May 26, 1918 – August 12, 1991) was an American football player and coach. He played professionally in the National Football League (NFL) for one game in 1945 with the Detroit Lions. He attended Saint Francis University in Loretto, Pennsylvania. Milano was the head coach for the 1945 Fort Benning Doughboys football team for the first two games of the season, before he was discharged from the Army in October. He was succeeded by Bill Meek.

Milano was later head of special services and entertainment at Fort Benning. He died on August 12, 1991, at this home in Columbus, Georgia.

== Head coaching record ==
Year	Team	Overall	Conference	Standing	Bowl/playoffs
Fort Benning Doughboys (Independent) (1945)
1945	Fort Benning	1–1 (Note: Milano was Fort Benning's head coach for the first two games of the 1945 season before he was discharged from the Army in October. He was succeeded by Bill Meek. Fort Benning finished the season with a record of 5–4–1.)			
Fort Benning:		1–1			
Total:		1–1			
