= Rudy Feldman =

American football player, coach, and executive

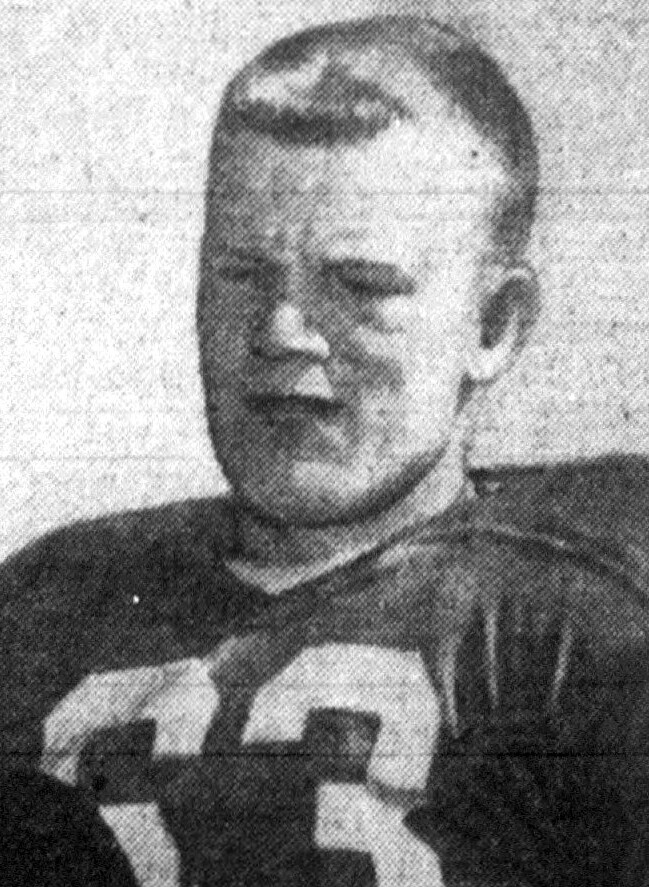
- Feldman, circa 1953

Biographical details
- Born: c. 1932

Playing career
- 1951–1953: UCLA
- Position: Guard

Coaching career (HC unless noted)
- 1957: Iowa State (line)
- 1958–1962: Oklahoma (ends)
- 1963–1967: Colorado (chief assistant)
- 1968–1973: New Mexico
- 1974–1977: San Diego Chargers (DL/LB)
- 1978–1985: St. Louis Cardinals (LB)

Administrative career (AD unless noted)
- 1987–1997: San Diego Chargers (dir. pro pers.)

Head coaching record
- Overall: 24–37–2

Rudolph A. Feldman (born c. 1932) is an American former football player, coach, and executive. He served as the head football coach at the University of New Mexico from 1968 to 1973, compiling a record of 24–37–2. Feldman played college football at the University of California, Los Angeles (UCLA) from 1951 to 1953. Prior to his stint at New Mexico, he was an assistant coach at Iowa State University, the University of Oklahoma, and the University of Colorado Boulder. After leaving New Mexico, he was an assistant coach in the National Football League (NFL) with the San Diego Chargers and the St. Louis Cardinals. He finished his career in the front office for the Chargers, serving as director of pro personnel from 1987 to 1997.

== Early life and playing career ==
Feldman grew up in Palo Alto, California. He attended the University of California, Los Angeles (UCLA), where he lettered for the Bruins as a guard for three seasons, from 1951 to 1953, under head coach Henry Russell Sanders. Feldman was co-captain of the 1953 Bruins team, which won the Pacific Coast Conference title and appeared in the 1954 Rose Bowl. Feldman joined Sigma Pi fraternity while in college. After college, he joined the U.S. Army and played for the club team at Fort Hood, Texas.

== Coaching career ==
Feldman began his coaching career in 1957 as an assistant coach at Iowa State University under head coach Jim Myers. He moved to the University of Oklahoma the following year and coached ends for the Sooners for five seasons (1958–1962) under Bud Wilkinson. In 1963, he moved to the University of Colorado Boulder with fellow Oklahoma assistant Eddie Crowder, who was hired as head coach for the Colorado Buffaloes. Feldman served as Crowder's chief assistant until 1967.

In December 1967 Feldman was hired the head football coach at the University of New Mexico, succeeding Bill Weeks. He signed a five-year contract with an annual salary of $18,600 subject to negotiation in following years. In December 1971 Feldman was announced as the new head football coach at Baylor University following the firing of Bill Beall. However, Feldman changed his mind a day later and remained at New Mexico.

== Head coaching record ==
=== College ===
Year	Team	Overall	Conference	Standing
New Mexico Lobos (Western Athletic Conference) (1968–1973)
1968	New Mexico	0–10	0–7	8th
1969	New Mexico	4–6	1–5	7th
1970	New Mexico	7–3	5–1	2nd
1971	New Mexico	6–3–2	5–1	2nd
1972	New Mexico	3–8	2–4	6th
1973	New Mexico	4–7	3–4	T–4th
New Mexico:		24–37–2	16–22	
Total:		24–37–2		
