= 1968 TCU Horned Frogs football team =

American college football season

1968 TCU Horned Frogs football
- Conference: Southwest Conference
- Record: 3–7 (2–5 SWC)
- Head coach: Fred Taylor (2nd season)
- Offensive scheme: TCU spread
- Home stadium: Amon G. Carter Stadium

1968 Southwest Conference football standings
	Conf.					Overall
Team	W		L		T	W		L		T
No. 6 Arkansas +	6	–	1	–	0	10	–	1	–	0
No. 3 Texas +	6	–	1	–	0	9	–	1	–	1
No. 14 SMU	5	–	2	–	0	8	–	3	–	0
Texas Tech	4	–	3	–	0	5	–	3	–	2
Baylor	3	–	4	–	0	3	–	7	–	0
Texas A&M	2	–	5	–	0	3	–	7	–	0
TCU	2	–	5	–	0	3	–	7	–	0
Rice	0	–	7	–	0	0	–	9	–	1
+ – Conference co-champions; Rankings from AP Poll

The 1968 TCU Horned Frogs football team represented Texas Christian University (TCU) in the 1968 NCAA University Division football season. The Horned Frogs finished the season 3–7 overall and 2–5 in the Southwest Conference. The team was coached by Fred Taylor in his second year as head coach. The Frogs played their home games in Amon G. Carter Stadium, which is located on campus in Fort Worth, Texas.

== Schedule ==
Date	Time	Opponent	Site	Result	Attendance	Source
September 21		at Georgia Tech*	Grant Field; Atlanta, GA	L 7–17	43,273	
September 28		Iowa*	Amon G. Carter Stadium; Fort Worth, TX	W 28–17	25,000	
October 5		No. 20 Arkansas	Amon G. Carter Stadium; Fort Worth, TX	L 7–17	41,126	
October 12		SMU	Amon G. Carter Stadium; Fort Worth, TX (rivalry)	L 14–21	31,542	
October 19		at Texas A&M	Kyle Field; College Station, TX (rivalry)	L 7–27	33,185	
October 26		at No. 18 LSU*	Tiger Stadium; Baton Rouge, LA	L 7–10	65,638	
November 2		Baylor	Amon G. Carter Stadium; Fort Worth, TX (rivalry)	W 47–14	23,078	
November 9		at Texas Tech	Jones Stadium; Lubbock, TX (rivalry)	L 14–31	40,140	
November 16	1:00 p.m.	No. 2 Texas	Amon G. Carter Stadium; Fort Worth, TX (rivalry)	L 21–47	40,000	
November 23		at Rice	Rice Stadium; Houston, TX	W 24–14	18,000	
*Non-conference game; Rankings from AP Poll released prior to the game; All times are in Central time

== Roster ==
1968 TCU Horned Frogs football team roster
Players
Coaches
Offense

Pos.	#	Name	Class
RB	23	Norm Bulaich	Jr
QB	14	Dan Carter	Jr
WR	26	Linzy Cole	Jr
QB	17	Ted Fay	Jr
RB	35	Ross Montgomery	Sr
G	63	James Ray	Jr
C	57	John Ruthstrom

Defense

Pos.	#	Name	Class

Special teams

Pos.	#	Name	Class

Head coach

- Fred Taylor

Coordinators/assistant coaches

Legend

- (C) Team captain
- (S) Suspended
- (I) Ineligible
- Injured
- Redshirt
