= 1968 Oregon State Beavers football team =

American college football season

1968 Oregon State Beavers football
- Conference: Pacific-8 Conference

Ranking
- Coaches: No. 13
- AP: No. 15
- Record: 7–3 (5–1 Pac-8)
- Head coach: Dee Andros (4th season)
- Captains: Steve Preece; Jon Sandstrom
- Home stadium: Parker Stadium; Civic Stadium

1968 Pacific-8 Conference football standings
	Conf.					Overall
Team	W		L		T	W		L		T
No. 4 USC $	6	–	0	–	0	9	–	1	–	1
No. 15 Oregon State	5	–	1	–	0	7	–	3	–	0
Stanford	3	–	3	–	1	6	–	3	–	1
California	2	–	2	–	1	7	–	3	–	1
Oregon	2	–	4	–	0	4	–	6	–	0
UCLA	2	–	4	–	0	3	–	7	–	0
Washington State	1	–	3	–	1	3	–	6	–	1
Washington	1	–	5	–	1	3	–	5	–	2
$ – Conference champion; Rankings from AP Poll

The 1968 Oregon State Beavers football team represented Oregon State University during the 1968 NCAA University Division football season. Home games were played on campus in Corvallis at Parker Stadium, with one at Civic Stadium in Portland.

Under fourth-year head coach Dee Andros, the Beavers were 7–3 overall and 5–1 in the Pacific-8 Conference (Pac-8). They were fifteenth in the final AP Poll, and outscored their opponents 285 to 179. The 17–13 loss at USC in November decided the conference title and the Rose Bowl berth. Prior to the 1975 season, the Pac-8 and Big Ten conferences allowed only one postseason participant each, for the Rose Bowl.

The Beavers were led on offense by quarterback Steve Preece and fullback Bill Enyart, nicknamed "Earthquake;" center John Didion was a consensus All-American.

== Schedule ==
Date	Opponent	Rank	Site	TV	Result	Attendance	Source
September 21	at Iowa*	No. 8	Iowa Stadium; Iowa City, IA		L 20–21	46,892	
September 28	at Utah*	No. 18	Ute Stadium; Salt Lake City, UT		W 24–21	19,265	
October 5	Washington		Parker Stadium; Corvallis, OR	ABC	W 35–21	30,220	
October 12	at Kentucky*	No. 20	McLean Stadium; Lexington, KY		L 34–35	32,000	
October 19	Arizona State*		Civic Stadium; Portland, Oregon		W 28–9	27,507	
October 26	at Washington State		Rogers Field; Pullman, WA		W 16–8	20,781	
November 2	at Stanford		Stanford Stadium; Stanford, CA		W 29–7	29,000	
November 9	UCLA^{†}	No. 15	Parker Stadium; Corvallis, OR		W 45–21	41,361	
November 16	at No. 1 USC	No. 13	Los Angeles Memorial Coliseum; Los Angeles, CA		L 13–17	59,236	
November 23	Oregon	No. 16	Parker Stadium; Corvallis, OR (Civil War)		W 41–19	40,144	
*Non-conference game; ^{†}Homecoming; Rankings from AP Poll released prior to the game

== Game summaries ==
=== Utah ===
- Bill Enyart 50 Rush, 299 Yds, 3 TD
- Oregon State did not complete a pass (0/4, INT)

=== Stanford ===
- Bobby Mayes 54 yard reverse for touchdown

=== Washington ===
- Roger Cantlon 4 Rec, 116 Yds

=== Kentucky ===
- Enyart 29 Rush, 105 Yds, 4 TD

=== Washington State ===
- Enyart 31 Rush, 137 Yds, TD

=== UCLA ===
- Enyart 32 Rush, 155 Yds, 2 TD

=== Oregon ===
- Enyart 37 Rush, 168 Yds, 3 TD

== Roster ==
1968 Oregon State Beavers football team roster
Players
Coaches
Offense

Pos.	#	Name	Class
QB	17	Gary Barton	So
SE	84	Roger Cantlon	Sr
C	52	John Didion	Sr
FB	46	Bill Enyart	Sr
HB	22	Billy Main	Jr
QB	19	Bob Mayes	Sr
TE	88	Bill Plumeau	Jr
QB	14	Steve Preece (C)	Sr
G	69	Rocky Rasley	Sr
TE	87	Nick Rogers	Sr
SE	80	Jim Scheele	Jr
OT	70	Kent Scott	Jr
G	62	Clyde Smith	Sr
OT	74	Roger Stalick	Sr
HB	21	Don Summers	Sr
C	51	Mike White	Jr
TE	81	Dan Zellick	So

Defense

Pos.	#	Name	Class
DE	33	Jerry Belcher	Sr
DT	64	Ron Boley	Sr
DG	59	Dale Branch	Jr
DB	38	Mel Easley	Sr
DE	82	Mike Foote	Sr
DT	67	Tom Greerty	Sr
LB	47	Mike Groff	Jr
LB	44	Wally Johnson	Jr
DB	23	Jeff Kolberg	So
DG	78	Bill Nelson	Jr
S	26	Larry Rich	Jr
DG	71	Jon Sandstrom (C)	Sr
DB	39	Don Whitney	Jr

Special teams

Pos.	#	Name	Class
P	30	Mike Nehl	So
PK	70	Kent Scott	Jr

Head coach

- Dee Andros (4th year)

Coordinators/assistant coaches

- Sam Boghosian (OL)
- Rich Brooks (DL)
- Mike Dolby
- Bob Herndon
- Ed Knecht
- Bud Riley (DB)
- Red Smith

Legend

- (C) Team captain
- (S) Suspended
- (I) Ineligible
- Injured
- Redshirt

== Statistics ==
- Bill Enyart 293 Rush, 1304 Yds, 17 TD (all three were single season school records until 1999 – Ken Simonton)
- Billy Main 32.1 yards per kick return

== Awards ==
- Team MVP: Steve Preece, Jon Sandstrom
- All Pac 8: John Didion, Bill Enyart, Jon Sandstrom
- All-American: John Didion (AFCA – 1st, AP, Central Press Association, Football News, FWAA – 1st, Newspaper Enterprise Association, Sporting News, Time, UPI, Walter Camp), Bill Enyart (UPI – 1st)

== NFL/AFL draft ==
Five Beavers were selected in the 1969 NFL/AFL draft, the third and final common draft, which lasted seventeen rounds (442 selections).

Rnd.	Pick	Team	Player	Pos.	College	Notes
2	27		Bill Enyart	FB	Oregon St	
3	67		Jon Sandstrom	DT	Oregon St	
7	213		John Didion	C	Oregon St	
9	216		Rocky Raisley	T	Oregon St	
9	229		Mike Foote	LB	Oregon St	

- QB Steve Preece was not drafted, but had a nine-year career in the NFL as a defensive back.
