= John Bridgers =

American football coach and college athletics administrator

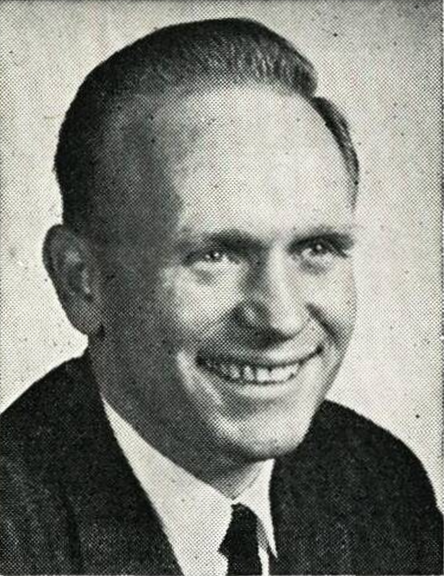
- Bridgers, c. 1964

Biographical details
- Born: January 13, 1922; Birmingham, Alabama, U.S.
- Died: November 24, 2006 (aged 84); Albuquerque, New Mexico, U.S.

Coaching career (HC unless noted)

Football
- 1946: Auburn (GA)
- 1947–1951: Sewanee (line)
- 1953–1956: Johns Hopkins
- 1957–1958: Baltimore Colts (assistant)
- 1959–1968: Baylor
- 1969: Pittsburgh Steelers (assistant)
- 1970–1972: South Carolina (assistant)

Administrative career (AD unless noted)
- 1959–1968: Baylor
- 1973–1979: Florida State
- 1979–1987: New Mexico

Head coaching record
- Overall: 59–74–2
- Bowls: 2–1

Accomplishments and honors

Championships
- 1 Mason–Dixon (1956)

John Dixon Bridgers II (January 13, 1922 – November 24, 2006) was an American football coach and college athletics administrator. He served as the head football coach at Johns Hopkins University from 1953 to 1956 and at Baylor University from 1959 to 1968, compiling a career college football record of 59–74–2. Bridgers was the athletic director at Florida State University from 1973 to 1979 and at the University of New Mexico from 1979 to 1987. He also worked as an assistant coach in the National Football League with the Baltimore Colts (1957–1958) and Pittsburgh Steelers (1969).

== Coaching career ==
Bridgers began his career as an assistant coach at the Sewanee: The University of the South (1947–1951), was head coach for the First Cavalry Division Artillery Team in Hokkaido, Japan in 1952 and was head football and track coach at Johns Hopkins University in Baltimore from 1953 to 1956. In 1957 and 1958 he served as a coach/coordinator for the Baltimore Colts, where he developed their pro-style offense attack. He carried that style with him in 1959, coming to Baylor to replace the fired Sam Boyd.

During his Baylor tenure, he compiled a 49–53–1 (.481) record. In his first five seasons, he led the Bears to three bowl games, winning two of them. He installed the Colts' wide-open passing game at Baylor, helping make All-Americans of quarterback Don Trull and wide receiver Lawrence Elkins after a record-breaking 1963 season. In the Bears' 1966 season opener against Syracuse at Baylor Stadium, Bridgers sent in John Hill Westbrook, making the sophomore running back the first black athlete to play for a Southwest Conference school.

Bridgers spent a year on Chuck Noll's first Pittsburgh Steelers staff, where he urged the coach to consider drafting a player he tried to recruit for Baylor, a quarterback named Terry Bradshaw. After the Steelers took Bradshaw with the first overall pick in the 1970 NFL draft they won four Super Bowls in the next decade.

== Administrative career ==
After Bridgers left Pittsburgh for an assistant's job at the University of South Carolina, he became athletic director at Florida State University in 1973. Despite inheriting a $1 million athletic deficit, he turned the program around with the single most important hire in school history, convincing another talented coach from Alabama, Hall of Famer Bobby Bowden to leave West Virginia for the Seminoles. Turning around another struggling athletic program, Bridgers left Florida State for the University of New Mexico in 1979, where his win brother Frank was a principal of a major engineering firm. He encountered a program where major NCAA infractions had surfaced in the basketball program under Norm Ellenberger, prompting an FBI investigation into transcript-rigging. Bridgers turned the scandal-ridden program around by hiring Gary Colson, and headed the athletic department as the football Lobos under Joe Morrison enjoyed a 10–1 season in 1982.

== Death ==
Bridgers died in Albuquerque, New Mexico of congestive heart failure at the age of 84.

== Head coaching record ==
Year	Team	Overall	Conference	Standing	Bowl/playoffs	Coaches^{#}	AP^{°}
Johns Hopkins Blue Jays (Mason–Dixon Conference) (1953–1956)
1953	Johns Hopkins	2–6	0–3	T–5th			
1954	Johns Hopkins	2–6	1–2	T–4th			
1955	Johns Hopkins	2–6	0–2	T–5th			
1956	Johns Hopkins	4–3–1	3–0	1st			
Johns Hopkins:		10–21–1	4–7				
Baylor Bears (Southwest Conference) (1959–1968)
1959	Baylor	4–6	2–4	5th			
1960	Baylor	8–3	5–2	T–2nd	L Gator	11	12
1961	Baylor	6–5	2–5	T–6th	W Gotham		
1962	Baylor	4–6	3–4	T–4th			
1963	Baylor	8–3	6–1	2nd	W Bluebonnet	20	
1964	Baylor	5–5	4–3	3rd			
1965	Baylor	5–5	3–4	T–4th			
1966	Baylor	5–5	3–4	5th			
1967	Baylor	1–8–1	0–6–1	8th			
1968	Baylor	3–7	3–4	5th			
Baylor:		49–53–1	31–37–1				
Total:		59–74–2					
National championship Conference title Conference division title or championship game berth
^{#}Rankings from final Coaches Poll.; ^{°}Rankings from final AP Poll.
