= Norm McBride =

American football player (born 1947)

No. 53
- Position: Defensive end

Personal information
- Born: February 21, 1947 (age 79); Los Angeles, California, U.S.
- Listed height: 6 ft 3 in (1.91 m)
- Listed weight: 245 lb (111 kg)

Career information
- High school: John C. Fremont (Los Angeles)
- College: Utah (1967-1968)
- NFL draft: 1969: 4th round, 89th overall pick

Career history
- Miami Dolphins (1969-1970)
- Stats at Pro Football Reference

Norman McBride (born February 21, 1947) is an American former professional football player who was a defensive end in the National Football League (NFL).

McBride was born and raised in Los Angeles, California. He attended John C. Fremont High School and played collegiate football at the University of Utah.

McBride was selected by the Miami Dolphins in the fourth round of the 1969 NFL/AFL draft.
