= 1968 Texas Tech Red Raiders football team =

American college football season

1968 Texas Tech Red Raiders football
- Conference: Southwest Conference
- Record: 5–3–2 (4–3 SWC)
- Head coach: J. T. King (8th season)
- Offensive scheme: T formation
- Base defense: 4–3
- Home stadium: Jones Stadium

1968 Southwest Conference football standings
| | Conf. | | | | | Overall |
| Team | W | | L | | T | W | | L | | T |
|---|---|---|---|---|---|---|---|---|---|---|
| No. 6 Arkansas + | 6 | – | 1 | – | 0 | 10 | – | 1 | – | 0 |
| No. 3 Texas + | 6 | – | 1 | – | 0 | 9 | – | 1 | – | 1 |
| No. 14 SMU | 5 | – | 2 | – | 0 | 8 | – | 3 | – | 0 |
| Texas Tech | 4 | – | 3 | – | 0 | 5 | – | 3 | – | 2 |
| Baylor | 3 | – | 4 | – | 0 | 3 | – | 7 | – | 0 |
| Texas A&M | 2 | – | 5 | – | 0 | 3 | – | 7 | – | 0 |
| TCU | 2 | – | 5 | – | 0 | 3 | – | 7 | – | 0 |
| Rice | 0 | – | 7 | – | 0 | 0 | – | 9 | – | 1 |
+ – Conference co-champions; Rankings from AP Poll

The 1968 Texas Tech Red Raiders football team represented Texas Technological College—now known as Texas Tech University—as a member of the Southwest Conference (SWC) during the 1968 NCAA University Division football season. In their eighth season under head coach J. T. King, the Red Raiders compiled a 5–3–2 record (4–3 against conference opponents), finished in fourth place in the SWC, and outscored opponents by a combined total of 255 to 241. The team's statistical leaders included Joe Matulich with 864 passing yards, Roger Freeman with 471 rushing yards, and Bobby Allen with 546 receiving yards. The team played its home games at Clifford B. & Audrey Jones Stadium.

== Schedule ==
| Date | Opponent | Rank | Site | Result | Attendance | Source |
|---|---|---|---|---|---|---|
| September 21 | Cincinnati* | | Jones Stadium; Lubbock, TX | T 10–10 | 35,200–35,258 | |
| September 28 | No. 6 Texas | | Jones Stadium; Lubbock, TX (rivalry) | W 31–22 | 50,167 | |
| October 5 | Colorado State* | | Jones Stadium; Lubbock, TX | W 43–13 | 35,111 | |
| October 12 | at Texas A&M | | Kyle Field; College Station, TX (rivalry) | W 21–16 | 45,000 | |
| October 19 | at Mississippi State* | No. 15 | Mississippi Veterans Memorial Stadium; Jackson, MS | T 28–28 | 28,000 | |
| October 26 | SMU^{†} | No. 19 | Jones Stadium; Lubbock, TX | L 18–39 | 50,352 | |
| November 2 | at Rice | | Rice Stadium; Houston, TX | W 38–15 | 20,000 | |
| November 9 | TCU | | Jones Stadium; Lubbock, TX (rivalry) | W 31–14 | 40,140 | |
| November 16 | at Baylor | | Baylor Stadium; Waco, TX (rivalry) | L 28–42 | 20,000 | |
| November 23 | No. 9 Arkansas | | Jones Stadium; Lubbock, TX (rivalry) | L 7–42 | 48,165 | |
*Non-conference game; ^{†}Homecoming; Rankings from AP Poll released prior to the game
