= 1969 Green Bay Packers season =

NFL team season

- Head coach: Phil Bengtson
- Home stadium: Lambeau Field; Milwaukee County Stadium

Results
- Record: 8–6
- Division place: 3rd Central
- Playoffs: Did not qualify

The 1969 Green Bay Packers season was their 51st season overall and their 49th season in the National Football League. The team had an 8–6 record under second-year head coach Phil Bengtson, finishing third in the Central division, four games behind the Minnesota Vikings.

== Overview ==
Without the disciplined guidance of Vince Lombardi steering the Packers for the first time in a decade, Green Bay started the season strong at 5–2, but stumbled down the stretch. Plagued by injuries and inconsistent play, the team clawed their way to their tenth winning season in the last eleven years.

Regardless of the winning record, by season's end several future Hall of Famers departed or retired (among those who retired or departed that year were the likes of Willie Davis and Herb Adderley), leaving the team scrambling to rebuild its depleted roster. As eager as Packer fans were to recapture the winning ways of Lombardi, it was obvious Titletown would have to wait to regain its luster.

== Offseason ==
=== NFL draft ===
The NFL draft was held on Tuesday, January 28, 1969. The Packers had the 12th pick overall and selected Rich Moore, a defensive tackle from Villanova. At this stage of the draft, several high profile players, such as running backs Calvin Hill and Ron Johnson, quarterback Terry Hanratty, and defensive lineman Dave Foley, Ted Hendricks and Fred Dryer were still available. The selection of Moore was made by Bengtson. Packers Personnel Director Pat Peppler and Lombardi both disagreed with the selection. After the draft, Lombardi announced that he was leaving the club to coach the Washington Redskins.

1969 Green Bay Packers draft
| Round | Pick | Player | Position | College | Notes |
| 1 | 12 | Rich Moore | Defensive tackle | Villanova | |
| 2 | 38 | Dave Bradley | Tackle | Penn State | |
| 3 | 64 | John Spilis | Wide receiver | Northern Illinois | |
| 4 | 90 | Perry Williams | Running back | Purdue | |
| 5 | 116 | Bill Hayhoe | Defensive tackle | USC | |
| 6 | 134 | Ron Jones | Tight end | UTEP | |
| 6 | 142 | Ken Vinyard | Placekicker | Texas Tech | |
| 7 | 168 | Larry Agajanian | Defensive tackle | UCLA | |
| 8 | 194 | Doug Gosnell | Defensive tackle | Utah State | |
| 9 | 220 | Dave Hampton | Running back | Wyoming | |
| 10 | 246 | Bruce Nelson | Tackle | North Dakota State | |
| 11 | 272 | Leon Harden | Defensive back | UTEP | |
| 12 | 298 | Tom Buckman | Tight end | Texas A&M | |
| 13 | 324 | Craig Koinzan | Linebacker | Doane | |
| 14 | 350 | Rich Voltzke | Running back | Minnesota Duluth | |
| 15 | 376 | Dan Eckstein | Defensive back | Presbyterian | |
| 16 | 402 | Dick Hewins | Wide receiver | Drake | |
| 17 | 428 | John Mack | Running back | Central Missouri | |
Made roster

=== Undrafted free agents ===
1969 undrafted free agents of note
| Player | Position | College |
|---|---|---|
| Don Bliss | Guard | Wisconsin |
| Terry Fredenberg | Wide receiver | UW–Milwaukee |
| Larry Gosney | Running back | Oklahoma State |

== Roster ==
1969 Green Bay Packers roster
| Quarterbacks: 13 Don Horn; 15 Bart Starr; 10 Billy Stevens; Running backs: 44 Donny Anderson P; 33 Jim Grabowski; 25 Dave Hampton; 22 Elijah Pitts; 31 Perry Williams; 23 Travis Williams; Wide receivers: 84 Carroll Dale; 86 Boyd Dowler; 85 John Spilis; Tight ends: 81 Marv Fleming; 88 Ron Jones | Offensive linemen: 57 Ken Bowman C; 68 Gale Gillingham G; 75 Forrest Gregg T; 77 Bill Hayhoe T; 50 Bob Hyland C; 72 Dick Himes T; 62 Bill Lueck G; 71 Francis Peay T; Defensive linemen: 82 Lionel Aldridge DE; 78 Bob Brown DT; 87 Willie Davis DE; 70 Rich Moore DT; 83 Phil Vandersea DE; 73 Jim Weatherwax DT; 58 Francis Winkler DE | Linebackers: 60 Lee Roy Caffey OLB; 53 Fred Carr OLB; 55 Jim Flanigan MLB; 66 Ray Nitschke MLB; 89 Dave Robinson OLB; Defensive backs: 26 Herb Adderley CB; 43 Doug Hart SS; 21 Bob Jeter CB; 45 John Rowser CB/S; 47 Gordon Rule CB/S; 24 Willie Wood FS; Special teams: 32 Booth Lusteg K | Reserve Lists: 27 Claudis James WR (IR); 74 Henry Jordan DT (IR); Taxi squad: 56 Larry Agajanian DT; 20 Andy Beath DB; 61 Dave Bradley G; 28 Leon Harden S; 38 Mike Mercer K |

=== Preseason ===
On August 30, a crowd of 85,532 fans viewed a doubleheader at Cleveland’s Municipal Stadium. In the first contest, the Chicago Bears played the AFL’s Buffalo Bills, while the Cleveland Browns hosted the Green Bay Packers in the second match.

== Regular season ==
=== Schedule ===
| Week | Date | Opponent | Result | Record | Venue | Attendance | Recap |
|---|---|---|---|---|---|---|---|
| 1 | September 21 | **Chicago Bears** | **W** 17–0 | 1–0 | Lambeau Field | 50,861 | Recap |
| 2 | September 28 | San Francisco 49ers | **W** 14–7 | 2–0 | Milwaukee County Stadium | 48,184 | Recap |
| 3 | October 5 | at **Minnesota Vikings** | **L** 7–19 | 2–1 | Memorial Stadium | 60,740 | Recap |
| 4 | October 12 | at **Detroit Lions** | **W** 28–17 | 3–1 | Tiger Stadium | 58,384 | Recap |
| 5 | October 19 | at Los Angeles Rams | **L** 21–34 | 3–2 | Los Angeles Memorial Coliseum | 78,947 | Recap |
| 6 | October 26 | Atlanta Falcons | **W** 28–10 | 4–2 | Lambeau Field | 50,861 | Recap |
| 7 | November 2 | at Pittsburgh Steelers | **W** 38–34 | 5–2 | Pitt Stadium | 46,403 | Recap |
| 8 | November 9 | at Baltimore Colts | **L** 6–14 | 5–3 | Memorial Stadium | 60,238 | Recap |
| 9 | November 16 | **Minnesota Vikings** | **L** 7–9 | 5–4 | Milwaukee County Stadium | 48,321 | Recap |
| 10 | November 23 | **Detroit Lions** | **L** 10–16 | 5–5 | Lambeau Field | 50,861 | Recap |
| 11 | November 30 | New York Giants | **W** 20–10 | 6–5 | Milwaukee County Stadium | 48,156 | Recap |
| 12 | December 7 | at Cleveland Browns | **L** 7–20 | 6–6 | Cleveland Stadium | 82,137 | Recap |
| 13 | December 14 | at **Chicago Bears** | **W** 21–3 | 7–6 | Wrigley Field | 45,216 | Recap |
| 14 | December 21 | St. Louis Cardinals | **W** 45–28 | 8–6 | Lambeau Field | 50,861 | Recap |
Note: Intra-division opponents are in **bold** text.

=== Season summary ===
==== Week 1 ====
| Team | 1 | 2 | 3 | 4 | Total |
|---|---|---|---|---|---|
| Bears | 0 | 0 | 0 | 0 | 0 |
| • **Packers** | 7 | 0 | 0 | 10 | 17 |

- Date: September 21
- Location: Lambeau Field, Green Bay, Wisconsin
- Game weather: 54 °F (12 °C), wind 6 mph
- Source: Pro-Football-Reference.com

Scoring summary
| 1 | GB | T. Williams 31-yard pass from Starr (Mercer kick) | Packers 7–0 |
| 4 | GB | Grabowski 1-yard run (Mercer kick) | Packers 14–0 |
| 4 | GB | Mercer 32-yard field goal | Packers 17–0 |

==== Week 2 ====
| Team | 1 | 2 | 3 | 4 | Total |
|---|---|---|---|---|---|
| 49ers | 0 | 0 | 7 | 0 | 7 |
| • Packers | 0 | 0 | 7 | 7 | 14 |

- Date: September 28
- Location: Milwaukee County Stadium, Milwaukee, WI
- Game weather: 54 °F (12 °C); wind 11 mph

Scoring summary
| Q3 | GB | Hampton 87 yard kickoff return (Mercer kick) | GB 7–0 |
| Q3 | SF | McNeil 80 yard pass from Brodie (Davis kick) | Tie 7–7 |
| Q4 | GB | Grabowski 2 yard pass from Starr (Mercer kick) | GB 14–7 |

== Standings ==
NFL Central
| | W | L | T | PCT | DIV | CONF | PF | PA | STK |
|---|---|---|---|---|---|---|---|---|---|
| Minnesota Vikings | 12 | 2 | 0 | .857 | 6–0 | 9–1 | 379 | 133 | L1 |
| Detroit Lions | 9 | 4 | 1 | .692 | 3–3 | 6–3–1 | 259 | 188 | W2 |
| Green Bay Packers | 8 | 6 | 0 | .571 | 3–3 | 5–5 | 269 | 221 | W2 |
| Chicago Bears | 1 | 13 | 0 | .071 | 0–6 | 0–10 | 210 | 339 | L6 |

Note: Tie games were not officially counted in the standings until 1972.
