= 1968 Green Bay Packers season =

50th season in franchise history

- General manager: Vince Lombardi
- Head coach: Phil Bengtson
- Home stadium: Lambeau Field; Milwaukee County Stadium

Results
- Record: 6–7–1
- Division place: 3rd Central
- Playoffs: Did not qualify

The 1968 Green Bay Packers season was their 50th season overall and the 48th season in the National Football League. Under first-year head coach Phil Bengtson, the team finished with a 6–7–1 record, third place in the four-team Central Division of the Western Conference.

It was the Packers' first losing season in a decade, and marked a turning point in team history, starting a long period of futility and decline known as the "Gory Years". From 1968 through 1991, Green Bay had only five winning seasons (1969, 1972, 1978, 1982, 1989), made the playoffs twice (1972, 1982), with one win (1982).

A few weeks after winning Super Bowl II in January 1968, Vince Lombardi stepped down as head coach but remained as general manager, and longtime defensive coordinator Bengston was promoted. Lombardi left after the season for the Washington Redskins.

== Offseason ==
=== NFL draft ===
1968 Green Bay Packers draft
Round	Pick	Player	Position	College	Notes
1	5	Fred Carr *	Linebacker	Texas at El Paso	
1	26	Bill Lueck	Guard	Arizona	
3	67	Billy Stevens	Quarterback	Texas at El Paso	
3	81	Dick Himes	Tackle	Ohio State	
4	92	Brendan McCarthy	Running back	Boston College	
4	108	John Robinson	Wide receiver	Tennessee State	
5	121	Steve Duich	Tackle	San Diego State	
5	137	Francis Winkler	Defensive end	Memphis State	
6	164	Walter Chadwick	Running back	Tennessee	
7	191	Andy Beath	Defensive back	Duke	
8	218	Tom Owens	Guard	Missouri-Rolla	
9	245	Bob Apisa	Running back	Michigan State	
10	260	Rick Cash	Tackle	Northeast Missouri State	
10	272	Ron Worthen	Center	Arkansas State	
11	299	Gordon Rule	Defensive back	Dartmouth	
12	325	Dennis Porter	Tackle	Northern Michigan	
13	353	Frank Geiselman	Wide receiver	Rhode Island	
14	380	John Farler	Wide receiver	Colorado	
15	407	Ridley Gibson	Defensive back	Baylor	
16	434	Al Groves	Tackle	St. Norbert	
17	461	Ken Rota	Running back	North Dakota State	
Made roster * Made at least one Pro Bowl during career

=== Undrafted free agents ===
1968 undrafted free agents of note
Player	Position	College
Bob Anderson	Kicker	Iowa
Lloyd Carr	Quarterback	Northern Michigan
John Giles	Kicker	Davidson
Stan Kucharski	Wide receiver	Bloomsburg
Tom Rowland	Cornerback	Illinois College

== Roster ==
1968 Green Bay Packers roster
Quarterbacks (QB): 12 Zeke Bratkowski; 13 Don Horn; 15 Bart Starr; 10 Billy Stevens; Running backs (RB): 44 Donny Anderson P; 33 Jim Grabowski; 30 Chuck Mercein K; 22 Elijah Pitts; 23 Travis Williams; Wide receivers (WR): 84 Carroll Dale; 86 Boyd Dowler; 27 Claudis James; 80 Bucky Pope; Tight ends (TE): 81 Marv Fleming; 83 Phil Vandersea	Offensive linemen (OL): 57 Ken Bowman C; 68 Gale Gillingham G; 75 Forrest Gregg T; 72 Dick Himes T; 50 Bob Hyland C; 64 Jerry Kramer G; 62 Bill Lueck G; 71 Francis Peay G; 76 Bob Skoronski T; Defensive linemen (DL): 82 Lionel Aldridge DE; 78 Bob Brown DT; 67 Leo Carroll DE; 70 Leon Crenshaw DT; 87 Willie Davis DE; 74 Henry Jordan DT; 77 Ron Kostelnik DT; 58 Francis Winkler DE	Linebackers (LB): 60 Lee Roy Caffey OLB; 53 Fred Carr OLB; 66 Ray Nitschke MLB; 55 Jim Flanigan MLB; 89 Dave Robinson OLB; Defensive backs (DB): 26 Herb Adderley CB; 40 Tom Brown SS; 43 Doug Hart CB; 21 Bob Jeter CB; 45 John Rowser CB/S; 47 Gordon Rule CB/S; 24 Willie Wood FS; Special teams (ST): 14 Errol Mann K; 38 Mike Mercer K; 64 Jerry Kramer K	Practice squad: -- Andy Beath DB; Reserve: 73 Jim Weatherwax DT (IR); 36 Ben Wilson FB (IR); Rookies in italics

== Schedule ==
Week	Date	Opponent	Result	Record	Venue	Attendance
1	September 15	Philadelphia Eagles	**W** 30–13	1–0	Lambeau Field	50,861
2	September 22	**Minnesota Vikings**	**L** 13–26	1–1	Milwaukee County Stadium	49,346
3	September 29	**Detroit Lions**	**L** 17–23	1–2	Lambeau Field	50,861
4	October 6	at Atlanta Falcons	**W** 38–7	2–2	Atlanta Stadium	58,850
5	October 13	Los Angeles Rams	**L** 14–16	2–3	Milwaukee County Stadium	49,646
6	October 20	at **Detroit Lions**	**T** 14–14	2–3–1	Tiger Stadium	57,302
7	October 28	at Dallas Cowboys	**W** 28–17	3–3–1	Cotton Bowl	74,604
8	November 3	**Chicago Bears**	**L** 10–13	3–4–1	Lambeau Field	50,861
9	November 10	at **Minnesota Vikings**	**L** 10–14	3–5–1	Metropolitan Stadium	47,644
10	November 17	New Orleans Saints	**W** 29–7	4–5–1	Milwaukee County Stadium	49,644
11	November 24	at Washington Redskins	**W** 27–7	5–5–1	D.C. Stadium	50,621
12	December 1	at San Francisco 49ers	**L** 20–27	5–6–1	Kezar Stadium	47,218
13	December 7	Baltimore Colts	**L** 3–16	5–7–1	Lambeau Field	50,861
14	December 15	at **Chicago Bears**	**W** 28–27	6–7–1	Wrigley Field	46,435
Note: Intra-division opponents are in **bold** text.

== Season summary ==
=== Week 1 vs Eagles ===
Week One: Philadelphia Eagles (0–0) at Green Bay Packers (0–0)

Quarter	1	2	3	4	Total
Eagles	3	3	0	7	13
Packers	7	14	6	3	30

at Lambeau Field, Green Bay, Wisconsin

- Date: September 15
- Game attendance: 67 °F (19 °C)
- Box Score

Game information

First quarter

- PHI – Sam Baker 27-yard field goal. Eagles 3–0. Drive:
- GB – Jim Grabowski 6-yard run (Jerry Kramer kick). Packers 7–3. Drive:

Second quarter

- GB – Carroll Dale 12-yard pass from Bart Starr (Jerry Kramer kick). Packers 14–3. Drive:
- PHI – Sam Baker 17-yard field goal. Packers 14–6. Drive:
- GB – Boyd Dowler 55-yard pass from Bart Starr (Jerry Kramer kick). Packers 21–6. Drive:

Third quarter

- GB – Jerry Kramer 17-yard field goal. Packers 24–6. Drive:
- GB – Jerry Kramer 22-yard field goal. Packers 27–6. Drive:

Fourth quarter

- PHI – Gary Ballman 2-yard pass from King Hill (Sam Baker kick). Packers 27–13. Drive:
- GB – Jerry Kramer 35-yard field goal. Packers 30–13. Drive:

Top passers

- PHI – King Hill – 16/35, 196 yards, TD, INT
- GB – Bart Starr – 14/18, 220 yards, TD, INT

Top rushers

- PHI – Tom Woodeshick – 11 rushes, 48 yards
- GB – Donny Anderson – 12 rushes, 92 yards

Top receivers

- PHI – Ben Hawkins – 4 receptions, 85 yards
- GB – Boyd Dowler – 5 receptions, 110 yards, TD

=== Week 14 ===
A win by the Packers was important because a Bears loss means that The Minnesota Vikings clinched the Central Division title and their first ever playoff berth.

Team	1	2	3	4	Total
• Packers	7	14	7	0	28
Bears	10	0	0	17	27

- Date: December 15
- Location: Wrigley Field
- Game weather: 22 °F (−6 °C), wind 7 mph

Scoring summary
1	CHI	Mac Percival 14-yard field goal	Bears 3–0
1	GB	Boyd Dowler 72-yard pass from Zeke Bratkowski (Mike Mercer kick)	Packers 7–3
1	CHI	Dick Gordon 48-yard pass from Jack Concannon (Mac Percival kick)	Bears 10–7
2	GB	Jim Grabowski 67-yard pass from Don Horn (Mike Mercer kick)	Packers 14–10
2	GB	Chuck Mercein 1-yard run (Mike Mercer kick)	Packers 21–10
3	GB	Boyd Dowler 25-yard pass from Don Horn (Mike Mercer kick)	Packers 28–10
4	CHI	Ronnie Bull 8-yard run (Mac Percival kick)	Packers 28–17
4	CHI	Mac Percival 26-yard field goal	Packers 28–20
4	CHI	Dick Gordon 51-yard pass from Jack Concannon (Mac Percival kick)	Packers 28–27

== Standings ==
NFL Central
	W	L	T	PCT	DIV	CONF	PF	PA	STK
Minnesota Vikings	8	6	0	.571	4–2	6–4	282	242	W2
Chicago Bears	7	7	0	.500	3–3	5–5	250	333	L1
Green Bay Packers	6	7	1	.462	1–4–1	2–7–1	281	227	W1
Detroit Lions	4	8	2	.333	3–2–1	4–5–1	207	241	L1

Note: Tie games were not officially counted in the standings until 1972.
