= 1969 NFL/AFL draft =

Selection of American football players

General information
- Date: January 28–29, 1969
- Location: Belmont Plaza Hotel in New York City, New York

Overview
- 442 total selections in 17 rounds
- League: NFL, AFL
- First selection: O. J. Simpson, RB; Buffalo Bills
- Mr. Irrelevant: Fred Zirkle, DT; New York Jets
- Most selections (20): Baltimore Colts; Houston Oilers
- Fewest selections (14): Detroit Lions; New York Giants; Washington Redskins
- Hall of Famers: 6: RB O. J. Simpson; DT Joe Greene; LB Ted Hendricks; WR Charlie Joiner; CB Roger Wehrli; CB Ken Riley

The 1969 NFL/AFL draft was part of the common draft, the third and final year in which the NFL and AFL held a joint draft of college players. The draft took place January 28–29, 1969.

The draft began with first overall pick of O. J. Simpson, the Heisman Trophy-winning running back from USC, by the American Football League's Buffalo Bills. It ended with the twenty-sixth pick in round 17, number 442 overall, of Fred Zirkie, defensive tackle from Duke University, by the AFL's NY Jets.

== Player selections ==
= Pro Bowler	= AFL All-Star	= Hall of famer

=== Round 1 ===
Pick #	NFL team	Player	Position	College
1	Buffalo Bills	O. J. Simpson	Running back	USC
2	Atlanta Falcons	George Kunz	Offensive tackle	Notre Dame
3	Philadelphia Eagles	Leroy Keyes	Running back	Purdue
4	Pittsburgh Steelers	Joe Greene	Defensive tackle	North Texas State
5	Cincinnati Bengals	Greg Cook	Quarterback	Cincinnati
6	Boston Patriots	Ron Sellers	Wide receiver	Florida State
7	San Francisco 49ers	Ted Kwalick	Tight end	Penn State
8	Los Angeles Rams	Larry Smith	Running back	Florida
9	San Diego Chargers	Marty Domres	Quarterback	Columbia
10	Los Angeles Rams	Jim Seymour	Wide receiver	Notre Dame
11	Miami Dolphins	Bill Stanfill	Defensive end	Georgia
12	Green Bay Packers	Rich Moore	Defensive tackle	Villanova
13	New York Giants	Fred Dryer	Defensive end	San Diego State
14	Chicago Bears	Rufus Mayes	Offensive tackle	Ohio State
15	Houston Oilers	Ron Pritchard	Linebacker	Arizona State
16	San Francisco 49ers	Gene Washington	Wide receiver	Stanford
17	New Orleans Saints	John Shinners	Offensive guard	Xavier
18	San Diego Chargers	Bob Babich	Linebacker	Miami (OH)
19	St. Louis Cardinals	Roger Wehrli	Cornerback	Missouri
20	Cleveland Browns	Ron Johnson	Running back	Michigan
21	Los Angeles Rams	Bob Klein	Tight end	USC
22	Oakland Raiders	Art Thoms	Defensive tackle	Syracuse
23	Kansas City Chiefs	Jim Marsalis	Cornerback	Tennessee State
24	Dallas Cowboys	Calvin Hill	Running back	Yale
25	Baltimore Colts	Eddie Hinton	Wide receiver	Oklahoma
26	New York Jets	Dave Foley	Offensive tackle	Ohio State

=== Round 2 ===
Pick #	NFL team	Player	Position	College
27	Buffalo Bills	Bill Enyart	Running back	Oregon State
28	Philadelphia Eagles	Ernie Calloway	Linebacker	Texas Southern
29	Atlanta Falcons	Paul Gipson	Running back	Houston
30	Pittsburgh Steelers	Terry Hanratty	Quarterback	Notre Dame
31	Cincinnati Bengals	Bill Bergey	Linebacker	Arkansas State
32	Boston Patriots	Mike Montler	Guard	Colorado
33	Baltimore Colts	Ted Hendricks	Linebacker	Miami (FL)
34	Detroit Lions	Altie Taylor	Running back	Utah State
35	St. Louis Cardinals	Rolf Krueger	Defensive tackle	Texas A&M
36	Denver Broncos	Grady Cavness	Defensive back	Texas–El Paso
37	Miami Dolphins	Bob Heinz	Tackle	Pacific
38	Green Bay Packers	Dave Bradley	Tackle	Penn State
39	Minnesota Vikings	Ed White	Guard	California
40	Houston Oilers	Jerry LeVias	Wide receiver	Southern Methodist
41	Chicago Bears	Bobby Douglass	Quarterback	Kansas
42	Pittsburgh Steelers	Warren Bankston	Running back	Tulane
43	Minnesota Vikings	Volly Murphy	Wide receiver	Texas–El Paso
44	San Diego Chargers	Ron Sayers	Running back	Nebraska-Omaha
45	New Orleans Saints	Richard Neal	Defensive end	Southern
46	Washington Redskins	Eugene Epps	Defensive back	Texas–El Paso
47	Detroit Lions	Jim Yarbrough	Tight end	Florida
48	Kansas City Chiefs	Ed Podolak	Running back	Iowa
49	Dallas Cowboys	Richmond Flowers	Wide receiver	Tennessee
50	Oakland Raiders	George Buehler	Guard	Stanford
51	Baltimore Colts	Tommy Maxwell	Defensive back	Texas A&M
52	New York Jets	Al Woodall	Quarterback	Duke

=== Round 3 ===
Pick #	NFL team	Player	Position	College
53	Buffalo Bills	Julian Nunamaker	Defensive end	Tennessee-Martin
54	Atlanta Falcons	Malcolm Snider	Tackle	Stanford
55	Cleveland Browns	Al Jenkins	Guard	Tulsa
56	Pittsburgh Steelers	Jon Kolb	Center	Oklahoma State
57	Cincinnati Bengals	Louis "Speedy" Thomas	Wide receiver	Utah
58	Boston Patriots	Carl Garrett	Running back	N.M. Highlands
59	Detroit Lions	Larry Walton	Wide receiver	Arizona State
60	New York Giants	Vernon Vanoy	Defensive end	Kansas
61	Denver Broncos	Bill Thompson	Cornerback	Maryland State
62	Washington Redskins	Ed Cross	Running back	Arkansas AM&N
63	Miami Dolphins	Eugene "Mercury" Morris	Running back	W. Texas State
64	Green Bay Packers	John Spilis	Wide receiver	Northern Illinois
65	Houston Oilers	Elbert Drungo	Tackle	Tennessee State
66	Chicago Bears	Ross Montgomery	Running back	Texas Christian
67	Atlanta Falcons	Jon Sandstron	Guard	Oregon State
68	Dallas Cowboys	Tom Stincic	Linebacker	Michigan
69	Philadelphia Eagles	Bill Bradley	Defensive back	Texas
70	San Diego Chargers	Eugene Ferguson	Tackle	Norfolk State
71	St. Louis Cardinals	Chip Healy	Linebacker	Vanderbilt
72	Cleveland Browns	Charles Glass	Tight end	Florida State
73	St. Louis Cardinals	Terry Brown	Defensive back	Oklahoma State
74	Dallas Cowboys	Halvor Hagen	Defensive tackle	Weber State
75	Oakland Raiders	Lloyd Edwards	Tight end	San Diego State
76	Kansas City Chiefs	Morris Stroud	Tight end	Clark
77	Baltimore Colts	Dennis Nelson	Tackle	Illinois Normal
78	Houston Oilers	Rich Johnson	Running back	Illinois

=== Round 4 ===
Pick #	NFL team	Player	Position	College
79	Buffalo Bills	Mike Richey	Tackle	North Carolina
80	Philadelphia Eagles	Bob Kuechenberg	Guard	Notre Dame
81	Atlanta Falcons	James Mitchell	Tight end	Prairie View
82	Pittsburgh Steelers	Bob Campbell	Running back	Penn State
83	Cincinnati Bengals	Clem Turner	Running back	Cincinnati
84	Denver Broncos	Mike Schnitker	Linebacker	Colorado
85	New Orleans Saints	Dennis Hale	Defensive back	Minnesota
86	San Francisco 49ers	Jim Sniadecki	Linebacker	Indiana
87	Baltimore Colts	Jacky Stewart	Running back	Texas Tech
88	Denver Broncos	Edward Hayes	Defensive back	Morgan State
89	Miami Dolphins	Norman McBride	Linebacker	Utah
90	Green Bay Packers	Perry Williams	Running back	Purdue
91	Chicago Bears	Rudy Redmond	Defensive back	Pacific
92	New York Giants	Rich Houston	Wide receiver	East Texas State
93	Houston Oilers	Charlie Joiner	Wide receiver	Grambling
94	San Francisco 49ers	Gene Moore	Running back	Occidental
95	Minnesota Vikings	Mike McCaffrey	Linebacker	California
96	Houston Oilers	Roy Gerela	Kicker	New Mexico State
97	St. Louis Cardinals	Bill Rhodes	Guard	Florida State
98	Cleveland Browns	Fred Summers	Defensive back	Wake Forest
99	Los Angeles Rams	John Zook	Defensive end	Kansas
100	Oakland Raiders	Ruby Jackson	Tackle	New Mexico State
101	Kansas City Chiefs	Jack Rudnay	Center	Northwestern
102	New Orleans Saints	Bob Hudspeth	Tackle	Southern Illinois
103	Atlanta Falcons	Dickie Lyons	Defensive back	Kentucky
104	New York Jets	Ezell Jones	Tackle	Minnesota

=== Round 5 ===
Pick #	NFL team	Player	Position	College
105	Buffalo Bills	Ben Mayes	Defensive tackle	Drake
106	Minnesota Vikings	Jim Barnes	Guard	Arkansas
107	Philadelphia Eagles	Jim Anderson	Guard	Missouri
108	St. Louis Cardinals	Walter Shockley	Running back	San Jose State
109	Cincinnati Bengals	Guy Dennis	Guard	Florida
110	Boston Patriots	Onree Jackson	Quarterback	Alabama A&M
111	New Orleans Saints	Tony Kyasky	Defensive back	Syracuse
112	Minnesota Vikings	Mike O'Shea	Wide receiver	Utah State
113	Denver Broncos	Frank Quayle	Running back	Virginia
114	Washington Redskins	Bill Kishman	Defensive back	Colorado State
115	Miami Dolphins	Willie Pearson	Defensive back	North Carolina A&T
116	Green Bay Packers	Bill Hayhoe	Defensive tackle	USC
117	New Orleans Saints	Keith Christensen	Tackle	Kansas
118	Houston Oilers	John Peacock	Defensive back	Houston
119	Chicago Bears	Jim Winegardner	Tight end	Notre Dame
120	San Francisco 49ers	Earl Edwards	Defensive tackle	Wichita State
121	Minnesota Vikings	Corny Davis	Running back	Kansas State
122	San Diego Chargers	Harry Orszulak	Wide receiver	Pittsburgh
123	St. Louis Cardinals	Gene Huey	Wide receiver	Wyoming
124	Cleveland Browns	Fair Hooker	Wide receiver	Arizona State
125	Dallas Cowboys	Chuck Kyle	Linebacker	Purdue
126	Kansas City Chiefs	Bob Stein	Linebacker	Minnesota
127	Atlanta Falcons	Tony Pleviak	Defensive end	Illinois
128	Miami Dolphins	Karl Kremser	Kicker	Tennessee
129	Baltimore Colts	King Dunlap	Defensive tackle	Tennessee State
130	New York Jets	Chris Gilbert	Running back	Texas

=== Round 6 ===
Pick #	NFL team	Player	Position	College
131	Denver Broncos	Wandy Williams	Running back	Hofstra
132	Philadelphia Eagles	Richard Barnhorst	Tight end	Xavier
133	Los Angeles Rams	A. Z. Drones	Tackle	W. Texas State
134	Green Bay Packers	Ron Jones	Tight end	Texas–El Paso
135	Cincinnati Bengals	Ken Riley	Defensive back	Florida A&M
136	Oakland Raiders	Ken Newfield	Running back	LSU
137	Atlanta Falcons	Wally Oyler	Defensive back	Louisville
138	New Orleans Saints	Bob Miller	Tight end	USC
139	Washington Redskins	Harold McLinton	Linebacker	Southern
140	Denver Broncos	Mike Coleman	Running back	Tampa
141	Miami Dolphins	Ed Tuck	Guard	Notre Dame
142	Green Bay Packers	Ken Vinyard	Kicker	Texas Tech
143	Houston Oilers	Willie Grate	Wide receiver	South Carolina State
144	Chicago Bears	Bill Nicholson	Defensive end	Stanford
145	Cleveland Browns	Larry Adams	Defensive tackle	Texas Christian
146	San Francisco 49ers	Jim Thomas	Running back	Texas-Arlington
147	San Diego Chargers	Terry Swarn	Wide receiver	Colorado State
148	Minnesota Vikings	Marion Bates	Defensive back	Texas Southern
149	St. Louis Cardinals	Amos Van Pelt	Running back	Ball State
150	Cleveland Browns	Joe Righetti	Defensive tackle	Waynesburg
151	Los Angeles Rams	Pat Curran	Linebacker	Lakeland (Wis)
152	Dallas Cowboys	Rick Shaw	Wide receiver	Arizona State
153	Oakland Raiders	Jackie Allen	Defensive back	Baylor
154	Baltimore Colts	Bill Fortier	Tackle	LSU
155	Kansas City Chiefs	John Pleasant	Running back	Alabama State
156	New York Jets	Jimmy Jones	Linebacker	Wichita State

=== Round 7 ===
Pick #	NFL team	Player	Position	College
157	Buffalo Bills	John Helton	Defensive end	Arizona State
158	Atlanta Falcons	Dick Enderle	Guard	Minnesota
159	Philadelphia Eagles	Mike Schmeising	Running back	St. Olaf
160	Pittsburgh Steelers	Chuck Beatty	Defensive back	North Texas State
161	Cincinnati Bengals	Royce Berry	Defensive end	Houston
162	Boston Patriots	Rick Hackley	Tackle	New Mexico State
163	Baltimore Colts	Gary Fleming	Defensive end	Samford (Ala)
164	Atlanta Falcons	Theo Cottrell	Linebacker	Delaware Valley
165	Denver Broncos	Al Giffin	Tight end	Auburn
166	Washington Redskins	Jeff Anderson	Running back	Virginia
167	Miami Dolphins	John Egan	Center	Boston College
168	Green Bay Packers	Larry Agajanian	Defensive tackle	UCLA
169	Chicago Bears	Ron Copeland	Wide receiver	UCLA
170	New York Giants	Al Brenner	Defensive back	Michigan State
171	Houston Oilers	Mike Richardson	Running back	Southern Methodist
172	San Francisco 49ers	Steven Van Sinderen	Tackle	Washington State
173	Washington Redskins	John Didion	Center	Oregon State
174	Miami Dolphins	John Kulka	Guard	Penn State
175	Pittsburgh Steelers	Chadwick Brown	Tackle	East Texas State
176	Cleveland Browns	Walt Summer	Defensive back	Florida State
177	Los Angeles Rams	James Hawkins	Defensive back	Nebraska
178	Oakland Raiders	Finnis Taylor	Defensive back	Prairie View
179	Kansas City Chiefs	Tom Nettles	Wide receiver	San Diego State
180	Dallas Cowboys	Larry Bales	Wide receiver	Emory & Henry
181	Baltimore Colts	Roland Moss	Running back	Toledo
182	New York Jets	Cliff Larson	Defensive end	Houston

=== Round 8 ===
Pick #	NFL team	Player	Position	College
183	Buffalo Bills	James Harvey	Tackle	Virginia Tech
184	Philadelphia Eagles	Bill Hobbs	Linebacker	Texas A&M
185	Atlanta Falcons	Jim Callahan	Wide receiver	Temple
186	Pittsburgh Steelers	Joe Cooper	Wide receiver	Tennessee State
187	Cincinnati Bengals	Tim Buchanan	Linebacker	Hawaii
188	Boston Patriots	Bob Gladieux	Running back	Notre Dame
189	New Orleans Saints	Jim Lawrence	Wide receiver	USC
190	Detroit Lions	Jim Carr	Tackle	Jackson State
191	Washington Redskins	Larry Brown	Running back	Kansas State
192	Buffalo Bills	James Harris	Quarterback	Grambling
193	Miami Dolphins	Bruce Weinstein	Tight end	Yale
194	Green Bay Packers	Doug Gosnell	Defensive tackle	Utah State
195	New York Giants	George Irby	Running back	Tuskegee
196	Houston Oilers	Glenn Woods	Defensive end	Prairie View
197	Chicago Bears	Webb Hubbell	Guard	Arkansas
198	San Francisco 49ers	Mike Loper	Tackle	Brigham Young
199	Minnesota Vikings	Harris Wood	Wide receiver	Washington
200	San Diego Chargers	Craig Cotton	Wide receiver	Youngstown State
201	St. Louis Cardinals	Wayne Mulligan	Center	Clemson
202	Cleveland Browns	Chuck Reynolds	Center	Tulsa
203	Los Angeles Rams	Richard Harvey	Defensive back	Jackson State
204	Kansas City Chiefs	Clanton King	Tackle	Purdue
205	Dallas Cowboys	Elmer Benhardt	Linebacker	Missouri
206	Kansas City Chiefs	Maurice LeBlanc	Defensive back	LSU
207	Baltimore Colts	Sam Havrilak	Quarterback	Bucknell
208	New York Jets	Cecil Leonard	Defensive back	Tuskegee

=== Round 9 ===
Pick #	NFL team	Player	Position	College
209	Boston Patriots	Steve Alexakos	Guard	San Jose State
210	Baltimore Colts	George Wright	Defensive tackle	Sam Houston State
211	Philadelphia Eagles	Kent Lawrence	Wide receiver	Georgia
212	Pittsburgh Steelers	John Sodaski	Defensive back	Villanova
213	Cincinnati Bengals	Mike Stripling	Running back	Tulsa
214	Boston Patriots	Joe Walker	Defensive end	Albany State
215	New Orleans Saints	Joe Owens	Linebacker	Alcorn A&M
216	Detroit Lions	Rocky Rasley	Guard	Oregon State
217	Denver Broncos	Henry Jones	Running back	Grambling
218	Philadelphia Eagles	Lynn Buss	Linebacker	Wisconsin
219	Miami Dolphins	Jesse Powell	Linebacker	W. Texas State
220	Green Bay Packers	Dave Hampton	Running back	Wyoming
221	Houston Oilers	Ed Watson	Linebacker	Grambling
222	Chicago Bears	Joe Aluise	Running back	Arizona
223	New York Giants	Ray Hickl	Linebacker	Texas A&I
224	San Francisco 49ers	Hilton Crawford	Defensive back	Grambling
225	Minnesota Vikings	Tom Fink	Guard	Minnesota
226	San Diego Chargers	Joe Williams	Defensive back	Southern
227	St. Louis Cardinals	Cal Snowden	Defensive end	Indiana
228	Cleveland Browns	Ron Kamzelski	Defensive tackle	Minnesota
229	Los Angeles Rams	Mike Foote	Linebacker	Oregon State
230	Dallas Cowboys	Claxton Welch	Running back	Oregon
231	Kansas City Chiefs	Dan Klepper	Guard	Omaha
232	Baltimore Colts	Larry Good	Quarterback	Georgia Tech
233	New York Jets	Frank Peters	Tackle	Ohio
234	Oakland Raiders	Drew Buie	Wide receiver	Catawba

=== Round 10 ===
Pick #	NFL team	Player	Position	College
235	Buffalo Bills	Ron Baines	Wide receiver	Montana
236	Philadelphia Eagles	Sonny Wade	Quarterback	Emory & Henry
237	Atlanta Falcons	Jeff Stanciel	Running back	Mississippi Valley
238	Pittsburgh Steelers	L. C. Greenwood	Defensive end	Arkansas AM&N
239	Cincinnati Bengals	Steve Howell	Tight end	Ohio State
240	Boston Patriots	Dennis Devlin	Defensive back	Wyoming
241	New Orleans Saints	McKinley Reynolds	Running back	Hawaii
242	Detroit Lions	Bob Bergum	Defensive end	Platteville (Wis)
243	Philadelphia Eagles	Donnie Shanklin	Running back	Kansas
244	Denver Broncos	Jim Smith	Defensive back	Utah State
245	Miami Dolphins	Jim Mertens	Tight end	Fairmont State (W. Va.)
246	Green Bay Packers	Bruce Nelson	Tackle	North Dakota State
247	Chicago Bears	Ron Pearson	Tight end	Maryland
248	New York Giants	Lou Galiardi	Defensive tackle	Dayton
249	Houston Oilers	Joe Pryor	Defensive end	Boston College
250	San Francisco 49ers	Dave Chapple	Kicker	Santa Barbara
251	San Diego Chargers	David Arnold	Guard	N.W. Louisiana
252	St. Louis Cardinals	Gerald Warren	Kicker	North Carolina State
253	Minnesota Vikings	Tom McCauley	Wide receiver	Wisconsin
254	Cleveland Browns	Greg Shelly	Guard	Virginia
255	Los Angeles Rams	Jerry Gordon	Tackle	Auburn
256	Houston Oilers	Bob Naponic	Quarterback	Illinois
257	Kansas City Chiefs	John Sponheimer	Defensive tackle	Cornell
258	Dallas Cowboys	Stuart Gottlieb	Tackle	Weber State
259	Baltimore Colts	Marion Griffin	Tight end	Purdue
260	New York Jets	Mike Hall	Linebacker	Alabama

=== Round 11 ===
Pick #	NFL team	Player	Position	College
261	Buffalo Bills	Bobby Hall	Running back	North Carolina State
262	Atlanta Falcons	Jeff Van Note	Linebacker	Kentucky
263	Philadelphia Eagles	Jim Marcum	Defensive back	Texas-Arlington
264	Pittsburgh Steelers	Clarence Washington	Defensive tackle	Arkansas AM&N
265	Cincinnati Bengals	Mark Stewart	Defensive back	Georgia
266	Boston Patriots	Barry Gallup	Wide receiver	Boston College
267	New Orleans Saints	Tom Morel	Wide receiver	LSU
268	Detroit Lions	Ron Walker	Defensive end	Morris Brown
269	Washington Redskins	Eric Norri	Defensive tackle	Notre Dame
270	Denver Broncos	Alan Pastrana	Quarterback	Maryland
271	Miami Dolphins	Mike Berdis	Tackle	North Dakota State
272	Green Bay Packers	Leon Harden	Defensive back	Texas–El Paso
273	New York Giants	John "Frenchy" Fuqua	Running back	Morgan State
274	Houston Oilers	Terry May	Center	Southern Methodist
275	Chicago Bears	Sam Campbell	Defensive tackle	Iowa State
276	San Francisco 49ers	Willie Peake	Tackle	Alcorn A&M
277	Minnesota Vikings	Brian Dowling	Quarterback	Yale
278	San Diego Chargers	Willie Norwood	Tight end	Alcorn A&M
279	St. Louis Cardinals	Gary Kerl	Linebacker	Utah
280	Cleveland Browns	Dave Jones	Wide receiver	Kansas State
281	Los Angeles Rams	Dave Svendsen	Wide receiver	Eastern Washington
282	Kansas City Chiefs	Skip Wupper	Defensive end	C.W. Post
283	Dallas Cowboys	Clarence Williams	Defensive tackle	Prairie View
284	Oakland Raiders	Harold Rice	Linebacker	Tennessee State
285	Baltimore Colts	Ken Delaney	Tackle	Akron
286	New York Jets	Gary Roberts	Guard	Purdue

=== Round 12 ===
Pick #	NFL team	Player	Position	College
287	Buffalo Bills	Lloyd Pate	Running back	Cincinnati
288	Philadelphia Eagles	Gary Adams	Defensive back	Arkansas
289	Atlanta Falcons	Denver Samples	Defensive tackle	Texas–El Paso
290	Pittsburgh Steelers	Doug Fisher	Linebacker	San Diego State
291	Cincinnati Bengals	Lonnie Paige	Defensive tackle	North Carolina College
292	Boston Patriots	Richard Lee	Defensive tackle	Grambling
293	New Orleans Saints	Tom Broadhead	Running back	Santa Barbara
294	Detroit Lions	Bob Hadlock	Defensive tackle	George Fox (Ore)
295	Washington Redskins	Bob Shannon	Defensive back	Tennessee State
296	Denver Broncos	Wes Plummer	Defensive back	Arizona State
297	Miami Dolphins	Dale McCullers	Linebacker	Florida State
298	Green Bay Packers	Tom Buckman	Tight end	Texas A&M
299	Houston Oilers	George Resley	Defensive tackle	Texas A&M
300	Chicago Bears	Dave Hale	Defensive end	Ottawa (KS)
301	New York Giants	Harry Blackney	Running back	Maryland
302	San Francisco 49ers	Jack O'Malley	Tackle	USC
303	Minnesota Vikings	Noel Jenke	Linebacker	Minnesota
304	San Diego Chargers	Jim White	Running back	Arkansas AM&N
305	St. Louis Cardinals	Howard Taylor	Running back	New Mexico State
306	Cleveland Browns	Dick Davis	Running back	Nebraska
307	Los Angeles Rams	Tim Carr	Quarterback	C.W. Post
308	Dallas Cowboys	Bob Belden	Quarterback	Notre Dame
309	Kansas City Chiefs	John Lavin	Linebacker	Notre Dame
310	Baltimore Colts	Butch Riley	Linebacker	Texas A&I
311	New York Jets	Mike Battle	Defensive back	USC
312	Oakland Raiders	Al Goddard	Defensive back	J.C. Smith

=== Round 13 ===
Pick #	NFL team	Player	Position	College
313	Buffalo Bills	Leon Lovelace	Tackle	Texas Tech
314	Atlanta Falcons	Harry Carpenter	Offensive tackle	Tennessee State
315	Philadelphia Eagles	Wade Key	Tight end	Southwest Texas State
316	Pittsburgh Steelers	John Lynch	Linebacker	Drake
317	Cincinnati Bengals	Chuck Benson	Wide receiver	Southern Illinois
318	Boston Patriots	Joe Leasy	Linebacker	Alcorn A&M
319	New Orleans Saints	Joe Robillard	Defensive back	Linfield (Ore.)
320	Detroit Lions	Wilson Bowie	Running back	USC
321	Denver Broncos	John Sias	Wide receiver	Georgia Tech
322	Washington Redskins	Michael Shook	Defensive back	North Texas State
323	Miami Dolphins	Amos Ayres	Defensive back	Arkansas AM&N
324	Green Bay Packers	Craig Koinzan	Linebacker	Doane
325	Chicago Bears	Tom Quinn	Defensive back	Notre Dame
326	New York Giants	Richard Perrin	Defensive back	Bowling Green
327	Houston Oilers	Richard Pickens	Running back	Tennessee
328	San Francisco 49ers	Paul Champlin	Defensive back	Eastern Montana
329	Minnesota Vikings	Jim Moylan	Defensive tackle	Texas Tech
330	San Diego Chargers	Mike Simpson	Defensive back	Houston
331	St. Louis Cardinals	Richard Heinz	Defensive tackle	Santa Barbara
332	Cleveland Browns	Tom Boutwell	Quarterback	Southern Mississippi
333	Los Angeles Rams	Roger Williams	Defensive back	Grambling
334	Oakland Raiders	Dave Husted	Linebacker	Wabash
335	Kansas City Chiefs	Rick Piland	Guard	Virginia Tech
336	Dallas Cowboys	Rene Matison	Wide receiver	New Mexico
337	Baltimore Colts	Carl Mauck	Linebacker	Southern Illinois
338	New York Jets	Steve O'Neal	Punter	Texas A&M

=== Round 14 ===
Pick #	NFL team	Player	Position	College
339	Buffalo Bills	Bubba Thornton	Wide receiver	Texas Christian
340	Philadelphia Eagles	James Ross	Tackle	Bishop
341	Atlanta Falcons	Billy Hunt	Defensive back	Kansas
342	Pittsburgh Steelers	Bob Houmard	Running back	Ohio
343	Cincinnati Bengals	Mike Wilson	Running back	Dayton
344	Boston Patriots	John Cagle	Linebacker	Clemson
345	New Orleans Saints	Gary Loyd	Kicker	California-Lutheran
346	Detroit Lions	George Hoey	Wide receiver	Michigan
347	Washington Redskins	Rick Brand	Defensive tackle	Virginia
348	Denver Broncos	Gary Crane	Linebacker	Arkansas State
349	Miami Dolphins	Glenn Thompson	Tackle	Troy State
350	Green Bay Packers	Rich Voltzke	Running back	Minnesota-Duluth
351	New York Giants	Steve Smith	Kicker	Weber State
352	Houston Oilers	Roy Reeves	Defensive back	South Carolina
353	Chicago Bears	Ron Ehrig	Defensive back	Texas
354	San Francisco 49ers	Tom Black	Wide receiver	East Texas State
355	Minnesota Vikings	Tommy Head	Center	Southwest Texas State
356	San Diego Chargers	Bill Ackman	Defensive tackle	New Mexico State
357	St. Louis Cardinals	Ed Roseborough	Quarterback	Arizona State
358	Cleveland Browns	Jiggy Smaha	Defensive tackle	Georgia
359	Los Angeles Rams	Ray Stephens	Running back	Minnesota
360	Kansas City Chiefs	Al Bream	Defensive back	Iowa
361	Dallas Cowboys	Gerald Lutri	Tackle	Northern Michigan
362	Oakland Raiders	Harold Busby	Wide receiver	UCLA
363	Baltimore Colts	Dave Bartelt	Linebacker	Colorado
364	New York Jets	Roger Finnie	Defensive end	Florida A&M

=== Round 15 ===
Pick #	NFL team	Player	Position	College
365	Buffalo Bills	Karl Wilson	Running back	Olivet (Mich)
366	Atlanta Falcons	Jim Weatherford	Defensive back	Tennessee
367	Philadelphia Eagles	Leon Angevine	Wide receiver	Penn State
368	Pittsburgh Steelers	Ken Liberto	Wide receiver	Louisiana Tech
369	Cincinnati Bengals	Bill Shoemaker	Kicker	Stanford
370	Boston Patriots	Brant Conley	Running back	Tulsa
371	New Orleans Saints	Bill Waller	Wide receiver	Xavier
372	Detroit Lions	Fred Gough	Linebacker	Texas-Arlington
373	Denver Broncos	Errol Kahoun	Guard	Miami (OH)
374	Washington Redskins	Paul Rogers	Tackle	Virginia
375	Miami Dolphins	Chick McGeehan	Wide receiver	Tennessee
376	Green Bay Packers	Dan Eckstein	Defensive back	Presbyterian
377	Houston Oilers	John Tysziewicz	Guard	Chattanooga
378	Chicago Bears	Bob Coble	Punter	Kansas State
379	New York Giants	Don Herrmann	Wide receiver	Waynesburg
380	San Francisco 49ers	Gary Golden	Defensive back	Texas Tech
381	Minnesota Vikings	Eugene Mosley	Tight end	Jackson State
382	San Diego Chargers	Charlie Jarvis	Running back	Army
383	St. Louis Cardinals	Fritz Latham	Tackle	Tuskegee
384	Cleveland Browns	Joe Stevenson	Tight end	Georgia Tech
385	Los Angeles Rams	George Jugum	Linebacker	Washington
386	Dallas Cowboys	Bill Justus	Defensive back	Tennessee
387	Oakland Raiders	Alvin Presell	Running back	Alabama A&M
388	Kansas City Chiefs	Leland Winston	Tackle	Rice
389	Baltimore Colts	George Thompson	Defensive back	Marquette
390	New York Jets	Wayne Stewart	Tight end	California

=== Round 16 ===
Pick #	NFL team	Player	Position	College
391	Buffalo Bills	Robert Kirk	Guard	Indiana
392	Philadelphia Eagles	Tom McClinton	Defensive back	Southern
393	Atlanta Falcons	Ed Hughes	Running back	Texas Southern
394	Pittsburgh Steelers	Dock Mosley	Wide receiver	Alcorn A&M
395	Cincinnati Bengals	Bill Schmidt	Linebacker	Missouri
396	Boston Patriots	Jim Vuono	Linebacker	Adams State
397	New Orleans Saints	Edd Hargett	Quarterback	Texas A&M
398	Detroit Lions	Ken Spain	Defensive end	Houston
399	Washington Redskins	Mike Washington	Linebacker	Southern
400	Denver Broncos	Billy Woods	Defensive back	North Texas State
401	Miami Dolphins	Lloyd Mumphord	Defensive back	Texas Southern
402	Green Bay Packers	Dick Hewins	Wide receiver	Drake
403	Chicago Bears	Dave Stydahar	Guard	Purdue
404	New York Giants	Byron Jones	Linebacker	W. Texas State
405	Houston Oilers	Loyd Wainscott	Defensive tackle	Texas
406	San Francisco 49ers	Bob Hoskins	Linebacker	Wichita State
407	Detroit Lions	John Stahl	Guard	Fresno State
408	San Diego Chargers	Willie Davenport	Wide receiver	Southern
409	St. Louis Cardinals	Junior Riggins	Running back	Kansas
410	Cleveland Browns	James Lowe	Wide receiver	Tuskegee
411	Los Angeles Rams	Henry Hipps	Linebacker	North Carolina A&T State
412	Oakland Raiders	William Davis	Linebacker	Alabama
413	Kansas City Chiefs	Eural Johnson	Defensive back	Prairie View
414	Dallas Cowboys	Floyd Kerr	Defensive back	Colorado State
415	Baltimore Colts	James McMillan	Running back	The Citadel
416	New York Jets	George Nock	Running back	Morgan State

=== Round 17 ===
Pick #	NFL team	Player	Position	College
417	Buffalo Bills	Wayne Lineberry	Linebacker	East Carolina
418	Atlanta Falcons	Paul Williams	Running back	California
419	Philadelphia Eagles	Bob Haack	Tackle	Linfield (Ore.)
420	Pittsburgh Steelers	Bill Eppright	Kicker	Kent State
421	Cincinnati Bengals	Terry Story	Tackle	Georgia Tech
422	Boston Patriots	George Muse	Linebacker	Grambling
423	New Orleans Saints	Chico Kurzawski	Defensive back	Northwestern
424	Detroit Lions	Gary Steele	Tight end	Army
425	Denver Broncos	Buster O'Brien	Quarterback	Richmond
426	Washington Redskins	Rich Dobbert	Defensive end	Springfield (Mass.)
427	Miami Dolphins	Tom Krallman	Defensive end	Xavier
428	Green Bay Packers	John Mack	Running back	Central Missouri
429	New York Giants	Ken Riley	Linebacker	Texas-Arlington
430	Houston Oilers	Hank Autry	Center	Southern Mississippi
431	Chicago Bears	Bob Long	Wide receiver	Texas A&M
432	San Francisco 49ers	Joe Rushing	Linebacker	Memphis State
433	Minnesota Vikings	Wendell Housley	Running back	Texas A&M
434	San Diego Chargers	Larry Rentz	Defensive back	Florida
435	St. Louis Cardinals	George Hummer	Center	Arizona State
436	Cleveland Browns	Bob Oliver	Defensive end	Abilene Christian
437	Los Angeles Rams	Jim Thorpe	Defensive back	Hofstra
438	Kansas City Chiefs	Ralph Jenkins	Defensive back	Tuskegee
439	Dallas Cowboys	Bill Bailey	Defensive tackle	Lewis & Clark
440	Oakland Raiders	Billy Austin	Tight end	Arkansas AM&N
441	Baltimore Colts	Joe Cowan	Wide receiver	Johns Hopkins
442	New York Jets	Fred Zirkle	Defensive tackle	Duke

= Pro Bowler	= AFL All-Star	= Hall of famer

== Hall of Famers ==
- O. J. Simpson, running back from Southern California, taken 1st round 1st overall by AFL's Buffalo Bills

Inducted: Professional Football Hall of Fame class of 1985.

- Joe Greene, defensive tackle from North Texas, taken 1st round 4th overall by Pittsburgh Steelers

Inducted: Professional Football Hall of Fame class of 1987.

- Ted Hendricks, linebacker from Miami, taken 2nd round 33rd overall by Baltimore Colts

Inducted: Professional Football Hall of Fame class of 1990.

- Charlie Joiner, wide receiver from Grambling State, taken 4th round 93rd overall by AFL's Houston Oilers

Inducted: Professional Football Hall of Fame class of 1996.

- Roger Wehrli, cornerback from Missouri, taken 1st round 19th overall by St. Louis Cardinals

Inducted: Professional Football Hall of Fame class of 2007.

- Ken Riley, defensive back from Florida A&M, taken 6th round 135th overall by Cincinnati Bengals

Inducted: Professional Football Hall of Fame class of 2023.

== Notable undrafted players ==
^{†}	= Pro Bowler

Original NFL team	Player	Pos.	College	Notes
Atlanta Falcons	Nate Wright	CB	San Diego State	
Buffalo Bills	Robert James ^{†}	CB	Fisk	
Buffalo Bills	Angelo Loukas	G	Northwestern	
Cincinnati Bengals	Horst Muhlmann	K		
Dallas Cowboys	Otto Brown	DB	Prairie View A&M	
Dallas Cowboys	Reggie Rucker	WR	Boston University	
Denver Broncos	George Burrell	S	Penn	
Denver Broncos	Ken Criter	LB	Wisconsin	
Detroit Lions	Larry Watkins	RB	Alcorn State	
Houston Oilers	Paul Zaeske	WR	North Park	
Los Angeles Rams	John Walton	QB	Elizabeth City State	
Minnesota Vikings	Len Johnson	C	St. Cloud State	
New Orleans Saints	Steve Preece	CB	Oregon State	
New Orleans Saints	Bob Shaw	WR	Winston-Salem State	
New York Giants	Tim McCann	DT	Princeton	
Philadelphia Eagles	Jay Johnson	LB	East Texas State	
Pittsburgh Steelers	Bob Adams	TE	Pacific	
Pittsburgh Steelers	Jim Clack	C	Wake Forest	
Pittsburgh Steelers	Clancy Oliver	CB	San Diego State	
Pittsburgh Steelers	Ed O'Neill	DE	Youngstown State	
San Francisco 49ers	Wayne Moore ^{†}	T	Lamar	
San Francisco 49ers	Bill Wondolowski	WR	Eastern Montana	
Washington Redskins	Curt Knight ^{†}	K	Texas	
Washington Redskins	Ted Vactor	S	Nebraska	
Washington Redskins	Pete Wysocki	LB	Western Michigan	
