= List of Ohio Bobcats in the NFL draft =

This is a list of Ohio Bobcats football players in the NFL draft.

== Key ==
B	Back	K	Kicker	NT	Nose tackle
C	Center	LB	Linebacker	FB	Fullback
DB	Defensive back	P	Punter	HB	Halfback
DE	Defensive end	QB	Quarterback	WR	Wide receiver
DT	Defensive tackle	RB	Running back	G	Guard
E	End	T	Offensive tackle	TE	Tight end

== Selections ==
Year	Round	Pick	Overall	Player	Team	Position
1936	1	9	9	Art Lewis	New York Giants	T
1939	6	5	45	Len Janiak	Brooklyn Dodgers	B
1939	12	3	103	Chet Adams	Cleveland Rams	T
1943	14	3	123	John Fekete	Brooklyn Dodgers	B
1943	28	10	270	Joe Riccardi	Washington Redskins	T
1946	15	7	137	John Kerns	Philadelphia Eagles	T
1948	7	4	49	Gene Ruszkowski	Los Angeles Rams	T
1954	24	1	278	Lou Sawchik	Chicago Cardinals	E
1958	15	9	178	Les Carney	Baltimore Colts	B
1960	13	8	152	Rich Grecni	Cleveland Browns	C
1961	9	10	122	Bob Brooks	Detroit Lions	RB
1962	12	11	165	Ted Stute	Cleveland Browns	E
1962	17	1	225	Allen Miller	Washington Redskins	G
1963	6	8	78	Charley Nickoson	Washington Redskins	T
1963	13	8	176	Dick Schultz	San Francisco 49ers	T
1965	9	1	113	John Frick	New York Giants	E
1969	9	25	233	Frank Peters	New York Jets	T
1969	14	4	342	Bob Houmard	Pittsburgh Steelers	RB
1970	3	13	65	Todd Snyder	Atlanta Falcons	WR
1970	11	11	271	Cleve Bryant	Denver Broncos	DB
1972	4	25	103	Al Benton	Miami Dolphins	T
1972	17	2	418	Dave Green	Cincinnati Bengals	P
1973	14	7	345	Dave Juenger	Chicago Bears	WR
1976	16	19	450	Mike Green	Miami Dolphins	P
2002	4	14	112	Dave Zastudil	Baltimore Ravens	P
2008	7	9	216	Landon Cohen	Detroit Lions	DT
2009	2	15	47	Mike Mitchell	Oakland Raiders	DB
2010	3	26	90	Taylor Price	New England Patriots	WR
2012	6	36	206	LaVon Brazill	Indianapolis Colts	WR
2013	7	19	225	Eric Herman	New York Giants	G
2014	7	4	219	T. J. Carrie	Oakland Raiders	DB
2017	3	16	80	Tarell Basham	Indianapolis Colts	DE
2017	5	4	148	Blair Brown	Jacksonville Jaguars	LB
2018	7	9	227	Quentin Poling	Miami Dolphins	LB
