= 1969 San Francisco 49ers season =

American football team season

- Owner: Josephine Morabito; Jane Morabito
- General manager: Louis Spadia
- Head coach: Dick Nolan
- Offensive coordinator: Ed Hughes
- Home stadium: Kezar Stadium

Results
- Record: 4–8–2
- Division place: 4th NFL Coastal
- Playoffs: Did not qualify

The 1969 San Francisco 49ers season was the franchise's 20th season in the National Football League, their 24th overall, and their second under head coach Dick Nolan.

== Offseason ==
=== NFL draft ===
1969 San Francisco 49ers draft
| Round | Selection | Player | Position | College | Notes |
|---|---|---|---|---|---|
| 1 | 7 | Ted Kwalick | TE | Penn State | |
| 1 | 16 | Gene Washington | WR | Stanford | |

== Personnel ==
=== Staff / Coaches ===
1969 San Francisco 49ers staff
| Front office: Team Owner(s) - Josephine Morabito & Jane Morabito; General manager / Team President – Louis Spadia; Personnel Scout - Dick Gallagher; Head coaches: Head coach - Dick Nolan; Offensive coaches: Chief of Offense / Offensive Coordinator - Ed Hughes; Offensive Consultant – Y.A. Tittle; Offensive Backfied – Mike Holovak; Offensive Line / Blocking – Ernie Zwahlen | Defensive coaches: Defensive Coordinator / Defensive Line – Paul Wiggin; Linebackers – Mike Giddings; Defensive Backfield / Secondary – Jim Shofner; Special teams coaches: Joe Perry - Kicking Coach / Game Scout |

=== Roster ===
1969 San Francisco 49ers roster
| Quarterbacks (QB): 12 John Brodie; 11 Steve Spurrier; Running backs (RB): 42 Doug Cunningham; 22 Gary Lewis; 24 Jimmy Thomas; 45 Bill Tucker; 40 Ken Willard; Wide receivers (WR): 81 Lee Johnson; 85 Clifton McNeil; 1 Noland Smith; 18 Gene Washington; 88 Dick Witcher; Tight ends (TE): 82 Ted Kwalick; 89 Bob Windsor | Offensive linemen (OL): 79 Cas Banaszek T; 65 Randy Beisler G/T; 75 Forrest Blue C; 66 Elmer Collett G; 73 Lance Olssen C; 69 Woody Peoples G; 76 Len Rohde T; Defensive linemen (DL): 72 Bill Belk DE; 74 Earl Edwards DE; 53 Tommy Hart DE; 70 Charlie Krueger DT; 60 Roland Lakes DT; 78 Sam Silas DE/DT | Linebackers (LB): 54 Harold Hays OLB; 57 Frank Nunley MLB; 58 Jim Sniadecki OLB; 52 Skip Vanderbundt OLB; 64 Dave Wilcox OLB; Defensive backs (DB): 39 Kermit Alexander CB; 37 Jimmy Johnson CB; 32 Mel Phillips FS; 27 Al Randolph SS; 25 Roosevelt Taylor FS/SS; 48 John Woitt CB; Special teams (ST): 17 Momcilo Gavric K; 15 Jon Kilgore P | Practice squad: 59 Fritz Greenlee LB; -- Bob Hoskins G; 43 Gene Moore RB; -- Wayne Moore T; Reserve: 50 Ed Beard LB (IR); -- David Chapple P (IR); 30 Johnny Fuller S (IR); 86 Kevin Hardy DT (IR); 80 Stan Hindman DE (IR); 33 Bill Wondolowski WR (IR); Rookies in italics 41 active, 10 reserve, 4 practice squad |

== Preseason ==
=== Schedule ===
| Week | Date | Opponent | Result | Record | Venue | Attendance |
|---|---|---|---|---|---|---|
| 1 | August 10 | vs. Cleveland Browns | L 19–24 | 0–1 | Husky Stadium | 32,219 |
| 2 | August 17 | Dallas Cowboys | L 17–20 | 0–2 | Kezar Stadium | 33,894 |
| 3 | August 23 | at Denver Broncos (AFL) | L 15–19 | 0–3 | Mile High Stadium | 33,161 |
| 4 | August 31 | at Oakland Raiders (AFL) | L 28–42 | 0–4 | Oakland-Alameda County Coliseum | 53,122 |
| 5 | September 7 | St. Louis Cardinals | L 10–21 | 0–5 | Kezar Stadium | 27,506 |
| 6 | September 13 | at Los Angeles Rams | L 28–31 | 0–6 | Anaheim Stadium | 39,179 |

== Regular season ==
=== Schedule ===
| Week | Date | Opponent | Result | Record | Venue | Attendance |
|---|---|---|---|---|---|---|
| 1 | September 21 | at **Atlanta Falcons** | **L** 12–24 | 0–1 | Atlanta Stadium | 45,490 |
| 2 | September 28 | at Green Bay Packers | **L** 7–14 | 0–2 | Milwaukee County Stadium | 48,184 |
| 3 | October 5 | Washington Redskins | **T** 17–17 | 0–2–1 | Kezar Stadium | 35,184 |
| 4 | October 12 | **Los Angeles Rams** | **L** 21–27 | 0–3–1 | Kezar Stadium | 45,995 |
| 5 | October 19 | **Atlanta Falcons** | **L** 7–21 | 0–4–1 | Kezar Stadium | 28,684 |
| 6 | October 26 | at **Baltimore Colts** | **W** 24–21 | 1–4–1 | Memorial Stadium | 60,238 |
| 7 | November 2 | Detroit Lions | **L** 14–26 | 1–5–1 | Kezar Stadium | 35,100 |
| 8 | November 9 | at **Los Angeles Rams** | **L** 30–41 | 1–6–1 | Los Angeles Memorial Coliseum | 73,795 |
| 9 | November 16 | **Baltimore Colts** | **W** 20–17 | 2–6–1 | Kezar Stadium | 38,472 |
| 10 | November 23 | at New Orleans Saints | **L** 38–43 | 2–7–1 | Tulane Stadium | 71,448 |
| 11 | November 27 | at Dallas Cowboys | **T** 24–24 | 2–7–2 | Cotton Bowl | 62,348 |
| 12 | December 6 | Chicago Bears | **W** 42–21 | 3–7–2 | Kezar Stadium | 32,826 |
| 13 | December 14 | at Minnesota Vikings | **L** 7–10 | 3–8–2 | Metropolitan Stadium | 43,028 |
| 14 | December 21 | Philadelphia Eagles | **W** 14–13 | 4–8–2 | Kezar Stadium | 25,391 |
Note: Intra-division opponents are in **bold** text.

== Standings ==
NFL Coastal
| | W | L | T | PCT | DIV | CONF | PF | PA | STK |
|---|---|---|---|---|---|---|---|---|---|
| Los Angeles Rams | 11 | 3 | 0 | .786 | 5–1 | 7–3 | 320 | 243 | L3 |
| Baltimore Colts | 8 | 5 | 1 | .615 | 3–3 | 5–4–1 | 279 | 268 | W1 |
| Atlanta Falcons | 6 | 8 | 0 | .429 | 2–4 | 4–6 | 276 | 268 | W3 |
| San Francisco 49ers | 4 | 8 | 2 | .333 | 2–4 | 3–7 | 277 | 319 | W1 |

Note: Tie games were not officially counted in the standings until 1972.

=== Game summaries ===
==== Week 6: at Baltimore Colts ====
Week Six: San Francisco 49ers (0–4–1) at Baltimore Colts (3–2)

| Quarter | 1 | 2 | 3 | 4 | Total |
|---|---|---|---|---|---|
| 49ers | 0 | 10 | 14 | 0 | 24 |
| Colts | 0 | 7 | 7 | 7 | 21 |

at Memorial Stadium, Baltimore, Maryland

- Date: October 26, 1969
- Game weather: 48 °F or 8.9 °C, relative humidity 49%, wind 5 miles per hour (8.0 km/h; 4.3 kn)

Game information

First quarter

- No scoring plays

Second quarter

- SF — Tommy Davis 18-yard field goal. 49ers 3–0
- BAL — Tom Matte 11-yard pass from Johnny Unitas (Lou Michaels kick). Colts 7–3
- SF — Ken Willard 5-yard rush (Tommy Davis kick). 49ers 10–7

Third quarter

- SF — Dick Witcher 18-yard pass from Steve Spurrier (Tommy Davis kick). 49ers 17–7
- SF — John Woitt 57-yard interception return (Tommy Davis kick). 49ers 24–7
- BAL — Jimmy Orr 6 yard pass from Johnny Unitas (Lou Michaels kick). 49ers 24–14

Fourth quarter

- BAL — Tom Matte 1 yard rush (Lou Michaels kick). 49ers 24–21

Top passers

- SF — Steve Spurrier – 18/30, 205 yards, TD, INT
- BAL — Johnny Unitas – 19/37, 300 yards, 2 TD, 3 INT

Top rushers

- SF — Doug Cunningham – 13 rushes, 51 yards
- BAL — Tom Matte – 17 rushes, 81 yards, TD

Top receivers

- SF — Dick Witcher – 3 receptions, 54 yards, TD
- BAL — Jimmy Orr – 8 receptions, 146 yards, TD

The win snapped the 49ers 13-game losing streak against the Colts, winning against them for the first time since the 1962 season. This would be the last time the 49ers would visit the Colts until 1989 — by when Robert Irsay had moved the franchise to Indianapolis — and the last time the 49ers would play in Baltimore until meeting the Ravens in 2003.

==== Week 10: at New Orleans Saints ====
Week Ten: San Francisco 49ers (2–6–1) at New Orleans Saints (2–7)

| Quarter | 1 | 2 | 3 | 4 | Total |
|---|---|---|---|---|---|
| 49ers | 7 | 14 | 7 | 10 | 38 |
| Saints | 0 | 7 | 21 | 15 | 43 |

at Tulane Stadium, New Orleans, Louisiana

- Date: November 23, 1969
- Game weather: 62 °F or 16.7 °C, relative humidity 75%, wind 9 miles per hour (14 km/h; 7.8 kn)
- Game attendance: 71,448

Game information

First quarter

- SF — Ken Willard 1-yard run (Momcilo Gavric kick). 49ers 7–0. Drive:

Second quarter

- SF — Dick Witcher 8-yard pass from Doug Cunningham (Momcilo Gavric kick). 49ers 14–0. Drive:
- SF – Ken Willard 1-yard run (Momcilo Gavric kick). 49ers 21–0. Drive:
- NO — Ray Poage 22-yard pass from Billy Kilmer (Tom Dempsey kick). 49ers 21–7. Drive:

Third quarter

- NO — Andy Livingston 12-yard run (Tom Dempsey kick). 49ers 21–14. Drive:
- NO — Danny Abramowicz 49-yard pass from Billy Kilmer (Tom Dempsey kick). Tie 21–21. Drive:
- NO — Danny Abramowicz 13-yard pass from Andy Livingston (Tom Dempsey kick). Saints 28–21. Drive:
- SF — Jimmy Thomas 45-yard pass from John Brodie (Momcilo Gavric kick). Tie 28–28. Drive:

Fourth quarter

- NO — Safety, center snap out of end zone. Saints 30–28.
- NO — Tom Dempsey 17-yard field goal. Saints 33–28. Drive:
- SF — Jimmy Thomas 18-yard pass from John Brodie (Momcilo Gavric kick). 49ers 35–33. Drive:
- NO — Tom Dempsey 43-yard field goal. Saints 36–35. Drive:
- SF — Momcilo Gavric 23-yard field goal. 49ers 38–36. Drive:
- NO — Ernie Wheelwright 3-yard run (Tom Dempsey kick). Saints 43–38. Drive:

Top passers

- SF – John Brodie – 15/24, 290 yards, 2 TD, INT
- NO – Billy Kilmer – 13/24, 235 yards, 2 TD

Top rushers

- SF – Doug Cunningham – 14 rushes, 84 yards
- NO – Andy Livingston – 14 rushes, 83 yards, TD

Top receivers

- SF – Jimmy Thomas – 3 receptions, 106 yards, 2 TD
- NO – Danny Abramowicz – 5 receptions, 113 yards, 2 TD

NFL Films selected this matchup as the Game of the Week.
