= Tim McCann =

Tim McCann may refer to:

- Tim McCann (American football) (born 1947), American football player
- Tim McCann (director) (born 1965), American film director
- Timothy J. McCann (1944–2022), British archivist
