= 1969 New York Giants season =

NFL team season

- Owner: Wellington Mara
- Head coach: Alex Webster
- Home stadium: Yankee Stadium

Results
- Record: 6–8
- Division place: 2nd NFL Century
- Playoffs: Did not qualify

The 1969 New York Giants season was the franchise's 45th season in the National Football League (NFL). The Giants moved back to the Century Division in 1969, after one season in the Capitol Division. They finished with a 6–8 record, and had one victory less than the previous year. New York placed second in the Century Division, four-and-a-half games behind the Cleveland Browns.

Before the season, the Giants selected Fred Dryer in the first round of the 1969 NFL/AFL draft, with the thirteenth overall pick, and traded with the Atlanta Falcons for running back Junior Coffey in late October. New York lost all of its preseason games, including a 37–14 rout by the New York Jets at the Yale Bowl in New Haven, leading the team to fire head coach Allie Sherman in mid-September, a week before the regular season began. Offensive backfield coach Alex Webster was promoted to head coach.

The Giants opened the season with a one-point win over the Minnesota Vikings, the eventual league champion, and held a 3–1 record after four games. However, they went on a seven-game losing streak, then won the final three games in December to close the season.

== Offseason ==
=== NFL draft ===
1969 New York Giants draft
Round	Pick	Player	Position	College	Notes
1	13	Fred Dryer *	Defensive end	San Diego State	
3	60	Vernon Vanoy	Defensive tackle	Kansas	made in 1971
4	92	Rich Houston	Wide receiver	East Texas State	
7	170	Al Brenner	Defensive back	Michigan State	
8	195	George Irby	Running back	Tuskegee	
9	223	Ray Hickl	Linebacker	Texas A&I	
10	248	Lou Galiardi	Defensive tackle	Dayton	
11	273	John Fuqua	Running back	Morgan State	
12	301	Harry Blackney	Running back	Maryland	
13	326	Richard Perrin	Defensive back	Bowling Green	
14	351	Steve Smith	Kicker	Weber State	
15	379	Don Herrmann	Wide receiver	Waynesburg	
Made roster * Made at least one Pro Bowl during career

== Roster ==
1969 New York Giants roster
Quarterbacks (QB): 10 Fran Tarkenton; 19 Gary Wood; Running backs (RB): 29 John Fuqua; 23 Ernie Koy P; 27 Randy Minniear; 40 Joe Morrison; Wide receivers (WR): 80 Dave Dunaway P; 85 Don Herrmann; 84 Rich Houston; 45 Homer Jones; Tight ends (TE): 87 Rich Kotite; 88 Aaron Thomas; 81 Freeman White; 86 Butch Wilson	Offensive linemen (OL): 77 Rich Buzin T; 65 Pete Case G; 54 Gene Ceppetelli C; 62 Darrell Dess G; 61 Charlie Harper G/T; 53 Greg Larson C; 63 Doug Van Horn G; 69 Willie Young T; Defensive linemen (DL): 79 Bruce Anderson DE; 82 McKinley Boston DE; 89 Fred Dryer DE; 71 Bob Lurtsema DT; 75 Joe Szczecko DT	Linebackers (LB): 56 Tommy Joe Crutcher OLB; 66 Henry Davis OLB; 55 Ralph Heck MLB; 57 Ray Hickl OLB; 52 John Kirby OLB; Defensive backs (DB): 48 Al Brenner SS; 20 Scott Eaton CB; 49 Jim Holifield CB; 43 Spider Lockhart FS; 44 Tom Longo FS; 21 Bruce Maher SS; 41 Willie Williams CB; Special teams (ST): 3 Pete Gogolak K/P	Practice squad: 24 Tucker Frederickson RB; 26 Kenny Parker CB; Reserve: 34 Junior Coffey RB (IR); 59 Chuck Hinton C (IR); 30 Allen Jacobs RB (IR); 78 Steve Wright T (IR); Rookies in italics

== Schedule ==
Week	Date	Opponent	Result	Record	Venue	Attendance
1	September 21	Minnesota Vikings	**W** 24–23	1–0	Yankee Stadium	62,900
2	September 28	at Detroit Lions	**L** 0–24	1–1	Tiger Stadium	54,358
3	October 5	Chicago Bears	**W** 28–24	2–1	Yankee Stadium	62,583
4	October 12	Pittsburgh Steelers	**W** 10–7	3–1	Yankee Stadium	62,987
5	October 19	at Washington Redskins	**L** 14–20	3–2	RFK Stadium	50,352
6	October 27	at Dallas Cowboys	**L** 3–25	3–3	Cotton Bowl	58,964
7	November 2	Philadelphia Eagles	**L** 20–23	3–4	Yankee Stadium	62,912
8	November 9	at St. Louis Cardinals	**L** 17–42	3–5	Busch Memorial Stadium	49,194
9	November 16	New Orleans Saints	**L** 24–25	3–6	Yankee Stadium	62,927
10	November 23	at Cleveland Browns	**L** 17–28	3–7	Cleveland Municipal Stadium	80,595
11	November 30	at Green Bay Packers	**L** 10–20	3–8	Milwaukee County Stadium	48,156
12	December 7	St. Louis Cardinals	**W** 49–6	4–8	Yankee Stadium	62,973
13	December 14	at Pittsburgh Steelers	**W** 21–17	5–8	Pitt Stadium	21,067
14	December 21	Cleveland Browns	**W** 27–14	6–8	Yankee Stadium	62,966
Note: Intra-division opponents are in **bold** text.

== Game summaries ==
=== Week 4 vs. Steelers ===
Pittsburgh Steelers (1–2) at New York Giants (2–1)

Quarter	1	2	3	4	Total
Steelers	0	0	0	7	7
Giants	7	0	0	3	10

at Yankee Stadium • Bronx, New York

- Date: October 12
- Game weather: 67 °F (19 °C) • Wind 9 miles per hour (14 km/h; 7.8 kn)
- Game attendance: 62,987
- Pro-Football-Reference.com

Game information

Steelers

- Dick Shiner
  14/24, 132 Yds, 2 INT
- Dick Hoak
  13 Rush, 64 Yds
- Roy Jefferson
  3 Rec, 58 Yds

Giants

- Fran Tarkenton
  16/29, 154 Yds, TD
- Ernie Koy Jr.
  8 Rush, 23 Yds
- Homer Jones
  3 Rec, 56 Yds

Scoring summary

Quarter	Time	Drive			Team	Scoring information	Score	
Quarter	Time	Plays	Yards	TOP	Team	Scoring information	PIT	NYG
1					Giants	Morrison 7-yard touchdown reception from Tarkenton, Gogolak kick good	0	7
4					Giants	14-yard field goal by Gogolak	0	10
4					Steelers	Shiner 18-yard touchdown run, Mingo kick good	7	10
"TOP" = time of possession. For other American football terms, see Glossary of American football.							7	10

== Standings ==
NFL Century
	W	L	T	PCT	DIV	CONF	PF	PA	STK
Cleveland Browns	10	3	1	.769	4–1–1	8–1–1	351	300	L1
New York Giants	6	8	0	.429	4–2	4–6	264	298	W3
St. Louis Cardinals	4	9	1	.308	3–2–1	3–6–1	314	389	L3
Pittsburgh Steelers	1	13	0	.071	0–6	0–10	218	404	L13

Note: Tie games were not officially counted in the standings until 1972.
