= Alex Webster (gridiron football) =

American football player and coach (1931–2012)

No. 86, 29
- Positions: Halfback, fullback

Personal information
- Born: April 19, 1931; Kearny, New Jersey, U.S.
- Died: March 3, 2012 (aged 80); Port St. Lucie, Florida, U.S.
- Listed height: 6 ft 3 in (1.91 m)
- Listed weight: 225 lb (102 kg)

Career information
- High school: Kearny
- College: NC State
- NFL draft: 1953: 11th round, 123rd overall pick

Career history

Playing
- Montreal Alouettes (1953–1954); New York Giants (1955–1964)

Coaching
- New York Giants (1967–1968) Backfield; New York Giants (1969–1973) Head coach

Awards and highlights
- NFL champion (1956); UPI NFL Coach of the year (1970); 2× Second-team All-Pro (1955, 1956); 2× Pro Bowl (1958, 1961); New York Giants Ring of Honor; 39th greatest New York Giant of all-time; Second-team All-Southern (1951)

Career NFL statistics
- Rushing yards: 4,638
- Rushing average: 3.9
- Receptions: 240
- Receiving yards: 2,679
- Total touchdowns: 56
- Stats at Pro Football Reference

Head coaching record
- Regular season: 29–40–1 (.421)
- Coaching profile at Pro Football Reference

Alexander "Red" Webster (April 19, 1931 – March 3, 2012) was an American professional football player who was a fullback and halfback in the Big Four for the Montreal Alouettes and in the National Football League (NFL) for the New York Giants. He was also the head coach of the Giants from 1969 to 1973.

== Early life ==
The son of recent Scottish immigrants James and Alexandrina Webster, Alex Webster grew up in Kearny, New Jersey, where he attended and played football at Kearny High School. Webster played a key role on Kearny High School's football team which won the 1948 New Jersey High School State Championship. After losing his father to cancer at an early age in 1941, Webster and his younger brother James were raised with the help of uncles and aunts and excelled in football, earning college scholarships.

As a senior at Kearny High School in 1948, Alex Webster was offered a full-ride scholarship from NFL legend Beattie Feathers to play college football at North Carolina State University. While playing for the Wolfpack, Alex "Big Red" Webster led the Southern Conference in scoring in 1951 with 78 points and remained a standout in 1952 before being drafted into the NFL.

== National Football League career ==
Webster was drafted in the 11th round of the 1953 NFL draft by the Washington Redskins, but chose to play professional Canadian football for the Montreal Alouettes from 1953 to 1954. While in Canada, he was named a Big Four all-star in 1954 and played in that year's Grey Cup.

In 1955, Webster returned to the United States and played for the New York Giants from 1955 to 1964. In his first year with the Giants, Webster led the team in rushing with 634 yards. While with the Giants, he rushed for 4,638 yards, caught 240 passes for 2,679 yards, and scored 56 touchdowns (39 rushing and 17 receiving). He was named to the Pro Bowl twice, in 1958 and 1961. With 336 points, Webster is 10th on the Giants' career scoring list.

In 1956, Webster played in the NFL championship game against the Chicago Bears featuring Hall of Fame players and coaches. Webster scored two touchdowns in the second half and contributed with 103 all-purpose yards. The game came to be known as the second "Sneakers Game" because the Giants chose to play in high-top Chuck Taylors due to icy field conditions. The Giants won the game 47–7.

As a player with the New York Giants, Webster played in six NFL Championship games: 1956, 1958, 1959, 1961, 1962, 1963.

Sportscaster Marty Glickman coined the phrase "a couple or three yards" when describing Webster's running style.

Webster was considered one of the "all-time great Giants" and in 2011, was inducted into the New York Giants' "Ring of Honor". Alex Webster, LB Brad Van Pelt and Carl Banks, TE Mark Bavaro and P Dave Jennings headlined as the second class of the Giants' Ring of Honor inductees. Webster stated that this honor was among the proudest moments of his life. Webster made his last public speech addressing 80,000 fans in attendance accompanied by his grandsons.

Webster is further honored in the New York Giants' Legacy Club where his vintage #29 game jersey, as well as many historic photographs are displayed.

== NFL career statistics ==
Legend
	Won the NFL championship
	Led the league
**Bold**	Career high

=== Regular season ===
Year	Team	Games		Rushing					Receiving				
Year	Team	GP	GS	Att	Yds	Avg	Lng	TD	Rec	Yds	Avg	Lng	TD
1955	NYG	12	11	128	634	**5.0**	**71**	5	22	269	12.2	48	1
1956	NYG	12	12	178	694	3.9	34	**7**	21	197	9.4	43	3
1957	NYG	11	10	135	478	3.5	34	5	30	330	11.0	41	1
1958	NYG	9	8	100	398	4.0	54	3	25	279	11.2	37	3
1959	NYG	10	8	79	250	3.2	16	5	27	381	**14.1**	43	2
1960	NYG	8	1	22	48	2.2	10	0	8	106	13.3	27	0
1961	NYG	14	14	196	**928**	4.7	59	2	26	313	12.0	**59**	3
1962	NYG	14	14	**207**	743	3.6	55	5	**47**	**477**	10.1	58	**4**
1963	NYG	7	7	75	255	3.4	12	4	15	128	8.5	19	0
1964	NYG	12	4	76	210	2.8	14	3	19	199	10.5	40	0
		109	89	1,196	4,638	3.9	71	39	240	2,679	11.2	59	17

=== Playoffs ===
Year	Team	Games		Rushing					Receiving				
Year	Team	GP	GS	Att	Yds	Avg	Lng	TD	Rec	Yds	Avg	Lng	TD
1956	NYG	1	1	12	27	2.3	6	**2**	**5**	**76**	15.2	**50**	0
1958	NYG	2	2	**24**	**86**	3.6	**12**	0	**5**	61	12.2	31	0
1959	NYG	1	1	8	25	3.1	9	0	0	0	0.0	0	0
1961	NYG	1	1	7	19	2.7	7	0	3	5	1.7	5	0
1962	NYG	1	1	15	56	**3.7**	**12**	0	1	5	5.0	5	0
1963	NYG	1	0	3	7	2.3	6	0	1	18	**18.0**	18	0
		109	89	1,196	4,638	3.9	71	39	240	2,679	11.2	59	17

== NFL coaching career ==
Webster eventually became an assistant Giant coach under Allie Sherman, and was promoted to head coach in September 1969. He was named UPI NFL Coach of the Year in 1970, as the Giants finished second in the NFC East at 9–5–0, but a 2–11–1 record in 1973 forced him to resign after five seasons. His overall Giant coaching record was 29 wins, 40 losses, and one tie. His successors, Bill Arnsbarger and John McVay, had similar outcomes as the team struggled through the 1970s.

== Head coaching record ==
=== NFL ===
Team	Year	Regular season					Postseason			
Team	Year	Won	Lost	Ties	Win %	Finish	Won	Lost	Win %	Result
NYG	1969	6	8	0	.429	2nd in NFL Century	–	–	–	–
NYG	1970	9	5	0	.643	2nd in NFC East	–	–	–	–
NYG	1971	4	10	0	.286	5th in NFC East	–	–	–	–
NYG	1972	8	6	0	.571	3rd in NFC East	–	–	–	–
NYG	1973	2	11	1	.179	5th in NFC East	–	–	–	–
Total		29	40	1	.421		–	–	–	

== Personal life ==
Webster married Louise Eggers in 1952, and had two children (Debra and James), four grandchildren (Kyle, Craig, Tammy, and Alexis), three nephews (Mark, David, and Todd), and a niece (Kristen). Webster also had four grandnieces: Elena, Alexandra, Alexandrina, and Maryn, and great-grandchildren Rachel and Colt.

After retiring from the NFL, Webster worked in sales and public relations for Nabisco until the early 1990s. Webster also worked in public relations for the Dinah Shore Golf Classic, appearing with former athletes and celebrities such as Joe DiMaggio, Willie Mays, Charley Conerley, Frank Gifford, Bob Hope, and President Gerald R. Ford. Webster served as a color commentator for the New York Giants radio broadcasts in the 1960s.

On January 27, 1977, at Toots Shor's funeral, Webster served as an honorary pallbearer along with Pete Rozelle, Art Rooney, Bowie Kuhn, Frank Gifford, Walter Cronkite and Howard Cosell.

Webster owned two restaurants after retiring from the NFL. His first restaurant was called The Stadium, located in Sea Girt, New Jersey, where he lived while he was a coach with the Giants. The interior was decorated with sports memorabilia from the New York Giants, New York Yankees and other professional teams. The other restaurant was called Alex Webster's and located in Tequesta, Florida.

On Nov. 18, 1962, Webster made a guest appearance on the Ed Sullivan Show (Episode #16.8).

Webster appeared on the gameshow Password which aired on March 16, 1964, with teammate Frank Gifford & actress Betsy Palmer (Season 4, Episode 48).

=== Death ===
Webster died March 3, 2012, in Port St. Lucie, Florida, aged 80.
