= Rick Duncan =

American football player (born 1941)

No. 3, 32
- Positions: Kicker, Punter

Personal information
- Born: August 14, 1941 (age 85); Mattoon, Illinois, U.S.
- Listed height: 6 ft 0 in (1.83 m)
- Listed weight: 208 lb (94 kg)

Career information
- High school: Matoon
- College: Eastern Montana
- NFL draft: 1966: undrafted

Career history
- Chicago Bears (1966)*; Wheeling Ironmen (1966-1967); Denver Broncos (1967); Philadelphia Eagles (1968); Detroit Lions (1969); Green Bay Packers (1969)*
- * Offseason or practice squad member only

Career NFL statistics
- Games played: 4
- Field goals attempted: 5
- Field goals made: 2
- Field goal percentage: 40%
- Punts: 8
- Punt yards: 305
- Stats at Pro Football Reference

Richard Joe Duncan (born August 14, 1941) is an American former professional football player who was a kicker and punter for three seasons in the National Football League NFL) for the Denver Broncos (1967), Philadelphia Eagles (1968) and Detroit Lions (1969). He played college football for the Eastern Montana Yellowjackets. He made two field goals in his NFL career and had five punts for 305 yards. He also played for the Wheeling Ironmen of the Continental Football League (COFL) in 1966 and in 1967.
