= Lee Johnson (wide receiver) =

American football player (born 1944)

No. 81
- Position: Wide receiver

Personal information
- Born: October 1, 1944; Houston, Texas, U.S.
- Died: March 26, 2023 (aged 78); Palo Alto, California, U.S.
- Listed height: 6 ft 1 in (1.85 m)
- Listed weight: 200 lb (91 kg)

Career information
- High school: Phillis Wheatley (Houston)
- College: Tennessee State (1965-1967)
- NFL draft: 1968: 6th round, 141st overall pick

Career history
- San Francisco 49ers (1969–1970)

Career NFL statistics
- Receptions: 4
- Receiving yards: 42
- Stats at Pro Football Reference

Leo O. Daniel Johnson (October 1, 1944 - March 26, 2023) is an American former professional football player who was a wide receiver for the San Francisco 49ers of the National Football League (NFL). He played college football for the Tennessee State Tigers.

== College career ==
Lee was offered multiple collegiate scholarships in multiple sports, becoming one of the first black athletes to receive an offer from Baylor University, he would choose to attend Tennessee State University. He would be named an All-American in 1966.

== Professional career ==
Lee was selected 141st overall in the 6th round of the 1968 NFL/AFL draft by the San Francisco 49ers.

== NFL career statistics ==
Year	Team	Games		Receiving				
Year	Team	GP	GS	Rec	Yds	Avg	Lng	Td
1969	SF	14	0	4	42	10.5	14	0
1970	SF	7	0	0	0	0	0	0
Career		21	0	4	42	10.5	14	0
