= Homer Jones (American football) =

American football player (1941–2023)

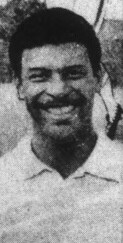
- Jones, circa 1970

No. 45, 85
- Position: Wide receiver

Personal information
- Born: February 18, 1941; Pittsburg, Texas, U.S.
- Died: June 14, 2023 (aged 82); Pittsburg, Texas, U.S.
- Listed height: 6 ft 2 in (1.88 m)
- Listed weight: 215 lb (98 kg)

Career information
- College: Texas Southern
- NFL draft: 1963: 20th round, 278th overall pick
- AFL draft: 1962: 24th round, 192 (Note: Originally selected by the San Diego Chargers, he was re-drafted in 1963 / Round: 5 / Pick: 33, by the Houston Oilers.)th overall pick

Career history
- Houston Oilers (1963)*; New York Giants (1964–1969); Cleveland Browns (1970); St. Louis Cardinals (1971)*; New York Stars / Charlotte Hornets (1974)*
- * Offseason or practice squad member only

Awards and highlights
- Second-team All-Pro (1967); 2× Pro Bowl (1967, 1968); NFL receiving touchdowns leader (1967); 27th greatest New York Giant of all-time; NFL record: Career yards per reception: 22.3 (Note: Minimum 200 career receptions.)

Career NFL statistics
- Receptions: 224
- Receiving yards: 4,986
- Receiving touchdowns: 36
- Stats at Pro Football Reference

Homer Carroll Jones (February 18, 1941 – June 14, 2023) was an American professional football player who was a wide receiver in the National Football League (NFL) for the New York Giants (1964–1969) and Cleveland Browns (1970). During his career, he was known for his considerable size and speed. Jones is credited with having invented the "spike" touchdown celebration.

== Early life ==
Jones was born on February 18, 1941, in Pittsburg, Texas. His mother was a schoolteacher and his father was a steelworker.

Jones attended Texas Southern College (now Texas Southern University), a historically black college, and starred in track and field as well as football, running the 100-yard and 220-yard dashes. He was drafted in 1963 by his hometown team, the Houston Oilers of the American Football League, but suffered a knee injury in training camp and was cut.

Jones was an nationally accomplished sprinter, finishing 3rd at the 1962 USA Outdoor Track and Field Championships in the 220 yards.

== New York Giants and the "spike" ==
The New York Giants offered Jones a bus ticket to New York and payment for knee surgery. Known as "Rhino" to his teammates, Jones wore uniform number 45 in New York. Having seen players such as Giants teammate Frank Gifford and Green Bay Packers star Paul Hornung celebrate touchdowns by throwing the ball at opposing fans in the stands, Jones decided to come up with his own, safer post-touchdown maneuver. In a 1965 game, after scoring a touchdown, he threw the football down hard in the end zone. He called the move a "spike". Modern post-touchdown celebrations, including "touchdown dances", are said to have arisen from Jones' invention. Contributing to his choice of action was a new rule for 1965 which would fine a player $500 if he threw a ball into the stands. Jones said the fine occurred to him, so he decided to throw the ball on the ground instead.

In 1967, Jones had his best season, catching 49 passes for 1,209 yards, an average of 24.7 yards per catch, and 13 touchdowns, leading the NFL in receiving touchdowns. He was second in the league in combined rushing and receiving yards from scrimmage, behind Leroy Kelly of the Browns. He made the NFL's Pro Bowl that season and the next.

== Later career and retirement ==
In January 1970, Jones was traded to the Browns in exchange for running back Ron Johnson, Wayne Meylan, 4th-round pick from Nebraska, and veteran defensive lineman Jim Kanicki. The Browns were in the market for a new wide receiver after having traded all-pro Paul Warfield to the Miami Dolphins.

In the team's first game of the 1970 NFL season on September 21, 1970, at Cleveland Municipal Stadium, Jones returned the second-half kickoff against the New York Jets for a touchdown, a key play in the Browns' 31–21 win over the Jets in front of 85,703 fans. The crowd, officially the largest crowd in Browns' history, was a part of NFL history that evening in the first game played on ABC's Monday Night Football.

However, that touchdown would be the highlight of his one season with the Browns as knee injuries soon caught up with Jones. Soon after being traded to the St. Louis Cardinals in July 1971, he was forced to retire at age 29.

Jones died of lung cancer in Pittsburg, on 14 June 2023, at the age of 82.

== Career statistics ==
Jones finished his career with 224 receptions for 4,986 yards, an average of 22.3 yards per reception, and 38 touchdowns (36 receiving, one rushing, one kick return). His yards per reception total ranks #1 in NFL history among players with at least 200 career receptions.

Legend
	NFL record
	Led the league
**Bold**	Career high

=== Regular season ===
Year	Team	Games		Receiving				
Year	Team	GP	GS	Rec	Yds	Avg	Lng	TD
1964	NYG	3	0	4	82	20.5	30	0
1965	NYG	**14**	3	26	709	**27.3**	89	6
1966	NYG	**14**	10	48	1,044	21.8	**98**	8
1967	NYG	**14**	**14**	**49**	**1,209**	24.7	70	**13**
1968	NYG	**14**	**14**	45	1,057	23.5	84	7
1969	NYG	**14**	**14**	42	744	17.7	54	1
1970	CLE	**14**	4	10	141	14.1	43	1
Career		87	59	224	4,986	22.3	98	36
