= Jay Johnson (American football player) =

American football player (born 1945)

No. 48
- Position: Linebacker

Personal information
- Born: October 8, 1945 (age 81); East Orange, New Jersey, U.S.
- Listed height: 6 ft 3 in (1.91 m)
- Listed weight: 230 lb (104 kg)

Career information
- High school: Montclair
- College: Texas A&M-Commerce
- NFL draft: 1969: undrafted

Career history
- Philadelphia Eagles (1969–1970)
- Stats at Pro Football Reference

Oliver Jay Johnson (born October 8, 1945) is an American former professional football player who was a linebacker for the Philadelphia Eagles of the National Football League (NFL). He played college football for East Texas A&M University.
