= Rich Moore (American football) =

American football player (born 1947)

No. 70
- Position: Defensive tackle

Personal information
- Born: April 26, 1947 (age 79); Cleveland, Ohio, U.S.
- Listed height: 6 ft 6 in (1.98 m)
- Listed weight: 280 lb (127 kg)

Career information
- High school: Villa Angela-St. Joseph (Cleveland)
- College: Villanova (1965-1968)
- NFL draft: 1969: 1st round, 12th overall pick

Career history
- Green Bay Packers (1969–1970); New England Patriots (1971)*
- * Offseason or practice squad member only

Career NFL statistics
- Fumble recoveries: 1
- Sacks: 6
- Stats at Pro Football Reference

Richard Clifton Moore (born April 26, 1947) is an American former professional football player who was a defensive tackle in the National Football League (NFL) who played 20 games for the Green Bay Packers. He played college football for the Villanova Wildcats before being selected by the Packers with the 12th pick in the first round of the 1969 NFL/AFL draft. He had previously been named as a first-team tackle on the East Coast Athletic Conference all-conference team in 1968, his senior season at Villanova. Moore went on to play for two seasons with the Packers. He tore an Achilles tendon in a win over the Philadelphia Eagles in the 1970 season, and had surgery shortly thereafter, putting him out for the season. After trying him on offense during training camp in 1971, the Packers traded him to the New England Patriots for linebacker John Bramlett in late July 1971. However, Moore was unable to play for the Patriots in 1971 due to injury. He was then released by the Patriots in June 1972.

Moore's only known statistic is a single fumble recovery in the 1969 season. His son, Brandon Moore, later played offensive tackle for the New England Patriots from 1993 through 1995.

== The 1969 Packers draft ==
Moore's selection is still remembered by Packers fans and observers as one of the most ill-fated in team history. Multiple writers have listed his selection as one of the most disappointing Packers draft picks of all time (though most do not make note of his career-ending injury). Packers' head coach Phil Bengtson overruled personnel director Pat Peppler, who had rated other players higher and who thought Moore would be available later in the draft. Vince Lombardi was still the Packers' general manager during the draft, but he was in negotiations to become head coach and general manager of the Washington Redskins, a deal which was finalized the next week. Peppler later said, "Rich Moore was a disaster. Phil Bengtson fell in love with his size." Three players available when the Packers took Moore went on the Pro Football Hall of Fame: Roger Wehrli, Ted Hendricks and Charlie Joiner, and they also passed up other players who starred in the NFL for many years, such as Fred Dryer, Calvin Hill and Ed White. Other Packers selections in the 1969 draft were also weak. The Packers' next pick, second round choice Dave Bradley, played in only 16 games in a career that ended in 1972, and by 1974 not one 1969 Packers pick remained on the team. Only 9th round choice Dave Hampton was in the NFL at all by 1975, finishing his NFL career with the Falcons and Eagles in 1976.
