= Bob Shaw (wide receiver) =

American football player (born 1947)

No. 30
- Position: Wide receiver

Personal information
- Born: March 16, 1947 (age 79); Wilson, North Carolina
- Listed height: 6 ft 0 in (1.83 m)
- Listed weight: 194 lb (88 kg)

Career information
- College: Winston-Salem State
- NFL draft: 1969: undrafted

Career history
- Richmond Roadrunners (1969); New Orleans Saints (1970)
- Stats at Pro Football Reference

Robert K. Shaw (born March 16, 1947) is an American former football wide receiver who played for the New Orleans Saints of the National Football League (NFL). He played college football at Winston-Salem State University.
