= Ed Hughes =

American football player and coach (1927–2000)

No. 32, 49, 48
- Position: Cornerback

Personal information
- Born: October 23, 1927; Buffalo, New York, U.S.
- Died: June 23, 2000 (aged 72); Libertyville, Illinois, U.S.
- Listed height: 6 ft 1 in (1.85 m)
- Listed weight: 184 lb (83 kg)

Career information
- High school: Kensington (Buffalo)
- College: NC State (1950); Cameron (1951); Tulsa (1952–1953)
- NFL draft: 1954: 10th round, 117th overall pick

Career history

Playing
- Hamilton Wildcats (1949); Los Angeles Rams (1954–1955); New York Giants (1956–1958)

Coaching
- Tulsa (1959) Assistant; Dallas Texans (1960–1962) Defensive backs; Denver Broncos (1963) Defensive backs; Washington Redskins (1964–1967) Defensive backs; San Francisco 49ers (1968–1969) Receivers; San Francisco 49ers (1970) Offensive coordinator; Houston Oilers (1971) Head coach; St. Louis Cardinals (1972) Assistant; Dallas Cowboys (1973–1974) Backfield; Dallas Cowboys (1975–1976) Running backs; Detroit Lions (1977) Offensive coordinator; New Orleans Saints (1978–1979) Offensive coordinator; New Orleans Saints (1980) Assistant; Philadelphia Eagles (1981) Assistant; Chicago Bears (1982–1988) Offensive coordinator; Chicago Bears (1989) Assistant; Philadelphia Eagles (1989) Quarterbacks; Lake Forest (1990) Defensive coordinator

Awards and highlights
- Super Bowl champion (XX); NFL champion (1956)

Career NFL statistics
- Interceptions: 3
- Fumble recoveries: 3
- Stats at Pro Football Reference

Head coaching record
- Regular season: 4–9–1 (.321)
- Coaching profile at Pro Football Reference

Edward D. Hughes (October 23, 1927 – June 23, 2000) was an American professional football player and coach whose career spanned more than three decades. His most prominent coaching position came in 1971 when he served as head coach of the National Football League (NFL)'s Houston Oilers.

== Playing career ==
Hughes, a native of Buffalo, New York, played college football on both sides of the ball at the University of Tulsa, then was drafted in the tenth round of the 1954 NFL draft by the Los Angeles Rams. Playing primarily at defensive back, Hughes collected two interceptions during his rookie year, then helped the team reach the NFL Championship game in 1955.

On August 12, 1956, Hughes was traded along with running back Tommy McCormick to the New York Giants for a fourth round draft pick. Hughes would play three seasons with his new team, helping them play twice in the NFL title game, including a convincing win over the Chicago Bears during his first season.

== Coaching career ==
In 1959, Hughes entered the coaching ranks, returning to his alma mater in Tulsa for one season. The following year, he joined Hank Stram's staff with the fledgling Dallas Texans of the new American Football League. His three years in the Lone Star state as defensive backs coach were capped with the team's first championship, coming in a double overtime thriller over the Houston Oilers.

After the 1962 season, Hughes was hired as an assistant with another AFL team, the Denver Broncos, but spent only one season there before accepting a position with the Washington Redskins. For four seasons, Hughes worked under two coaches, then left to become offensive coordinator for the San Francisco 49ers. The move reunited Hughes with Dick Nolan, who not only was his former teammate with the Giants, but also his brother-in-law.

After the 49ers struggled during the 1968 and 1969 seasons, the team put it all together during Nolan and Hughes' third year, winning the NFC West Division while also leading the league in total offense. The renewed success of the team was beneficial for Hughes, who accepted a five-year contract as head coach of the Oilers on January 21, 1971.

The lengthy contract would prove to be a mirage as Hughes lasted just one season in the position. An indication of the season came in the opener when Houston was shut out 31–0 by the Cleveland Browns, and continued when Hughes fired two assistant coaches during the campaign. The disarray concluded on December 22 when Hughes resigned after a strange power struggle in which Hughes asked that the team trainer be fired, while team owner Bud Adams insisted that the equipment manager (who Hughes had fired) be reinstated.

Almost two years later, one more example of the havoc surrounding the team surfaced when Oilers center Jerry Sturm indicated that he had been offered a bribe to affect the outcome of a game. Following Hughes' departure, the Oilers became the first (and to date, only) team to post consecutive one-win seasons since the AFL-NFL merger, going 1–13 in 1972 and 1973.

Hughes briefly worked in a trailer factory until a contract settlement was reached, then accepted the quarterbacks coach position with the St. Louis Cardinals on August 30, 1972. When Cardinals' head coach Bob Hollway was fired after that season, Hughes found new employment on March 8, 1973, as offensive backfield coach of the Dallas Cowboys. Hughes' new boss, Tom Landry, had earlier played a role in his future when his 1956 retirement resulted in the Giants' trade for Hughes.

During his four seasons with the Cowboys, the team played in two NFC Championship games and competed in Super Bowl X against the Pittsburgh Steelers. Hughes left in 1977 to join Tommy Hudspeth's staff with the Detroit Lions, but the entire group was dismissed on January 9, 1978.

He re-joined Dick Nolan who had been named head coach of the New Orleans Saints in 1978. The reunion of Nolan and Hughes would last only three years, when an improved 1979 Saints team turned into the infamous "Aints" of 1980. That squad was symbolized by their loss to the 49ers on December 7 in which they blew a 28-point lead.

Hughes would spend the 1981 NFL season with the Philadelphia Eagles, then move on to become offensive coordinator of the Chicago Bears under new head coach Mike Ditka. While the Bears would become known for their defensive prowess during this era, the offense still had the unparalleled exploits of running back Walter Payton. The combination was enough to lead the Bears to a title in 1985, capped with a 46–10 victory over the New England Patriots in Super Bowl XX.

The Bears would go on to the postseason in each of the next three seasons, but Hughes resigned during the 1989 training camp after being demoted, then become quarterback coach of the Eagles midway through the season. In 1990, Hughes was hired as defensive coordinator at Lake Forest College. Hughes had his five children and ten grandchildren.

== Head coaching record ==
| Team | Year | Regular season | | | | | Postseason | | | |
| Team | Year | Won | Lost | Ties | Win % | Finish | Won | Lost | Win % | Result |
|---|---|---|---|---|---|---|---|---|---|---|
| HOU | 1971 | 4 | 9 | 1 | .321 | 3rd in AFC Central | – | – | – | – |
| Total | | 4 | 9 | 1 | .321 | | – | – | – | – |
