= Drew Buie =

American football player (born 1947)

No. 89
- Position: Wide receiver

Personal information
- Born: July 12, 1947 (age 79); Council, North Carolina, U.S.
- Listed height: 6 ft 0 in (1.83 m)
- Listed weight: 185 lb (84 kg)

Career information
- High school: Winston-Salem (NC) Griffith
- College: Catawba
- NFL draft: 1969: 9th round, 234th overall pick

Career history
- Oakland Raiders (1969–1971); Cincinnati Bengals (1972); Jacksonville Sharks (1974)

Career NFL/AFL statistics
- Receptions: 9
- Receiving yards: 227
- Touchdowns: 2
- Stats at Pro Football Reference

Drew Buie (born July 12, 1947) is an American former professional football player who was a wide receiver in the National Football League (NFL). He played college football for the Catawba Indians. He played in the NFL for the Oakland Raiders from 1969 to 1971 and for the Cincinnati Bengals in 1972.
