= Doug Fisher (American football) =

American football player (1947–2023)

No. 54
- Position: Linebacker

Personal information
- Born: March 10, 1947; Fresno, California, U.S.
- Died: February 12, 2023 (aged 75); San Diego, California, U.S.
- Listed height: 6 ft 1 in (1.85 m)
- Listed weight: 225 lb (102 kg)

Career information
- High school: Caruthers (Caruthers, California)
- College: Reedley JC; San Diego State
- NFL draft: 1969: 12th round, 290th overall pick

Career history
- Pittsburgh Steelers (1969–1971)

Awards and highlights
- All-CCJCAA (1965); First-team All-Coast (1968); Reedley Athletic Hall of Fame (1997)

Career NFL statistics
- Games played: 10
- Games started: 1
- Stats at Pro Football Reference

Douglas Gene Fisher (March 10, 1947 – February 12, 2023) was an American professional football player who was a linebacker for two seasons in the National Football League (NFL) for the Pittsburgh Steelers. He played college football at Reedley JC and San Diego State and was selected by the Steelers in the 12th round (290th overall) of the 1969 NFL/AFL draft.

== Early life and education ==
Fisher was born on March 10, 1947, in Fresno, California. He attended Monroe Junior High School and later Caruthers High School, at which he was one of the top track and field players in the state, specializing in the discus throw and shot put. He set a divisional record in discus and tied one in shot put. Fisher also played football for the school, and is their only attendee to ever play in the National Football League (NFL). Standing at 6 ft 1 in (1.85 m) and weighing 225 pounds (102 kg), he was described in newspapers as a "mountain of muscle" and was nicknamed "Locomotive."

After graduating from Caruthers, Fisher began attending Reedley Junior College in 1965. He played for their track and field and football teams, and played both fullback on offense and guard on defense. In a game near the end of the 1965 season, Fisher scored two touchdowns and helped Reedley win the CCJCAA championship. He received the team's Most Outstanding Lineman award for the year and was an all-conference selection.

In his first season with the Reedley track team, Fisher broke the school record for discus throw with a toss measuring 173 ft 1 1/2 in (52.77 m) and was awarded the team's MVP trophy. He placed second at that season's state junior college championship tournament. The following year, he won the state discus championship over Joe Keshmiri and posted a throw that was the best in the nation among junior colleges. Fisher also was ranked in one list as one of the top 20 track and field participants in the US, and top 10 in college.

Fisher was scouted by San Diego State University, and upon graduating from Reedley JC, was offered a full scholarship by the school. He continued playing track and football there, although he changed his position to linebacker in the latter. He received praise from coach Don Coryell, who said that Fisher could be a great professional player. As a senior in 1968, he was named first-team All-Coast by United Press International (UPI). Fisher graduated with a double degree in marketing and sociology.

== Professional career ==
Fisher was selected in the 12th round (290th overall) of the 1969 NFL/AFL draft by the Pittsburgh Steelers. He was waived at the start of September and afterwards was brought back as a member of the taxi squad. He was activated near the end of October after the team released John Campbell, and was put back on the taxi squad in late November after Jerry Hillebrand was activated. Fisher was activated once further in 1969, for the season finale against the New Orleans Saints. He finished his rookie season having appeared in a total of six games, one of which he started.

Fisher was released by the Steelers on August 30, 1970, partially due to an injury sustained in training camp. He was afterwards re-signed to the taxi squad, and was signed to the active roster prior to their week six game against the Oakland Raiders. Fisher appeared in the game against Oakland, and in their subsequent three matches, against the Cincinnati Bengals, New York Jets, and Kansas City Chiefs, before suffering an injury which required surgery. He finished the season with four games played, none as a starter.

Fisher was released by the Steelers for a final time in July 1971, which ultimately ended his career. He played in a total of ten games with the Steelers, starting one. Art Rooney Jr. described his career as "much less successful" than players such as Jon Kolb, L. C. Greenwood, and Joe Greene, "but not insignificant."

== Later life and death ==
Fisher returned to California after his football career, and spent the rest of his life living in San Diego. He later worked for the Union Oil, General Dynamics, and Compton's New Media businesses. He was married to Cheryl Fisher and had two daughters with her. In 1997, Fisher was inducted into the Reedley Athletic Hall of Fame. He was a lifelong football fan and watched every Super Bowl until his death. Fisher died on the evening of February 12, 2023, at age 75, shortly after watching Super Bowl LVII.
