= Fred Carr =

American football player (1946–2018)

No. 53
- Position: Linebacker

Personal information
- Born: August 19, 1946; Phoenix, Arizona, U.S.
- Died: February 19, 2018 (aged 71); Phoenix, Arizona, U.S.
- Listed height: 6 ft 5 in (1.96 m)
- Listed weight: 238 lb (108 kg)

Career information
- High school: Phoenix (AZ) Union
- College: UTEP
- NFL draft: 1968: 1st round, 5th overall pick

Career history
- Green Bay Packers (1968–1977)

Awards and highlights
- Second-team All-Pro (1975); 3× Pro Bowl (1970, 1972, 1975); Green Bay Packers Hall of Fame; First-team All-American (1967); Sun Bowl MVP (1967)

Career NFL statistics
- Fumble recoveries: 15
- Interceptions: 8
- Touchdowns: 1
- Sacks: 13
- Stats at Pro Football Reference

Freddie Alton Carr (August 19, 1946 – February 19, 2018) was an American professional football player who played linebacker for the Green Bay Packers of the National Football League (NFL) from 1968 to 1977.

Carr attended Phoenix Union High School, where he also competed in basketball and track, representing P.U.H.S. as a discus thrower and in the shot put. He was in the top ten discus throwers in the U.S. in his senior year. He played for Phoenix College before transferring to the University of Texas at El Paso (UTEP) in 1965, where he was called "Probably the best overall linebacker in school history." Fred was inducted into the UTEP Athletics Hall of Fame, September 23, 2005, and would later also be elected to the Phoenix College (PCAA) Hall of Fame in their inaugural class of 2007.

== Green Bay Packers ==
Carr was the fifth overall selection of the 1968 NFL/AFL draft, taken by the Green Bay Packers. The Packers got this draft slot in the previous year's trade with New Orleans that sent longtime fullback Jim Taylor to the Saints. Some were surprised that the Packers, who already had a strong linebacking corps led by future hall of famers Ray Nitschke and Dave Robinson, chose him. General Manager Vince Lombardi (who retired as coach immediately after the draft's conclusion), however, considered him to be the best player in the draft, and one who could play a variety of positions, including linebacker, tight end, strong safety, and defensive end.

Carr's professional career spanned ten seasons, all with the Packers. His final season was 1977; before the 1978 season, the Packers, by this time coached by Carr's former teammate, Bart Starr, waived him as the result of a deep conflict over how Carr's injured knee should be treated. He settled his dispute with the Packers in 1979 and signed with the San Diego Chargers as a free agent, but never played for them.

Carr recorded his lone NFL touchdown on November 7, 1976, intercepting a Bobby Douglass pass in the third quarter and returning it 10 yards for a key score in the Packers' 32-27 victory vs. the New Orleans Saints at Milwaukee.

== Post-NFL life ==
Carr had six children, and his nephew Terry Fair played in the NFL. Carr was named to the Green Bay Packers Hall of Fame in 1983. Carr died on February 19, 2018, after suffering from dementia and prostate cancer, at the age of 71.

Carr was the second inductee into the Green Bay Packers Hall of Fame from UTEP, following Jesse Whittenton, a defensive back on the Packers' 1961 and 1962 championship teams.
