= Bill Wondolowski =

American football player (born 1946)

William Walter Wondolowski
No. 22, 33
- Position: Wide receiver

Personal information
- Born: November 29, 1946; Jersey City, New Jersey, U.S.
- Died: April 11, 1994 (aged 47); San Francisco, California, U.S.
- Listed height: 5 ft 10 in (1.78 m)
- Listed weight: 168 lb (76 kg)

Career information
- High school: Bayonne (Bayonne, New Jersey)
- College: Eastern Montana (1965-1968)
- NFL draft: 1969: undrafted

Career history
- Sacramento Capitols (1969); San Francisco 49ers (1969)
- Stats at Pro Football Reference

William Walter Wondolowski (November 29, 1946 – April 11, 1994) was a former professional American football wide receiver, who played for the San Francisco 49ers in 1969.
