= Eastern Montana Yellowjackets football =

- First season: 1947
- Last season: 1978
- Location: Billings, Montana
- League: NAIA

The Eastern Montana Yellowjackets football team represented Eastern Montana College in the sport of American football from 1947 through 1978.

== Yearly records ==
Year	Coach	Overall	Conference	Standing	Bowl/playoffs
Frontier Conference (1947–1978)
1947	Oscar Bjorgum	3–1–1	3–1–1		
1948	Oscar Bjorgum	4–2	4–1		
1949	Oscar Bjorgum	1–5	1–2		
1950	Oscar Bjorgum	1–4	1–3		
1951	Oscar Bjorgum	2–3	1–3		
1952	Oscar Bjorgum	0–5	0–4	5th	
1953	Oscar Bjorgum	2–3–1	1–2–1		
1954	Oscar Bjorgum	1–4	1–3		
1955	Dale Daugherty	2–3	2–2		
1956	Dale Daugherty	3–2–1	2–1–1		
1957	Dale Daugherty	6–2	4–1		
1958	Ken Karr	6–2	4–1		
Total:					
National championship Conference title Conference division title or championship game berth

== Notable players ==
- Rick Duncan
- Bill Wondolowski
