= Bob Houmard =

American gridiron football player (1947–2021)

Profile
- Position: Fullback

Personal information
- Born: February 1, 1947; Wooster, Ohio, U.S.
- Died: March 29, 2021 (aged 74); Winter Haven, Florida, U.S.
- Listed height: 6 ft 3 in (1.91 m)
- Listed weight: 230 lb (104 kg)

Career information
- High school: Orrville (Orrville, Ohio)
- College: Ohio
- NFL draft: 1969: 14th round, 342nd overall pick

Career history
- 1969–1970: Winnipeg Blue Bombers
- 1971: Montreal Alouettes*
- 1971: Edmonton Eskimos
- 1971–1972: Ottawa Rough Riders
- 1973: Toronto Argonauts*
- 1974: Memphis Southmen
- * Offseason or practice squad member only

Career CFL statistics
- Rushing attempts: 515
- Rushing yards: 2,278
- Rushing touchdowns: 17
- Receptions: 85
- Receiving yards: 740
- Receiving touchdowns: 1

Bob Houmard (born February 1, 1947 – March 29, 2021) was an American professional football fullback who played in the Canadian Football League (CFL) and World Football League (WFL). He played college football at Ohio.

== Early life ==
Houmard was born in Wooster, Ohio and grew up in Orrville, Ohio and attended Orrville High School, where he played baseball, basketball and football. As a senior, he set school records with 1,255 rushing yards and 155 points scored and was named All-Chippewa Conference, a High School All-American, and a North Squad All-Star.

== College career ==
Houmard played college football for the Ohio Bobcats and was a three-year starter at fullback. Houmard was named All-MAC as a senior after rushing for 419 yards and 12 touchdowns and catching 14 passes for 232 yards and seven touchdowns as the Bobcats won the 1968 Mid-American Conference title. Houmard finished his collegiate career with 1,176 rushing yards and 18 touchdowns on 291 carries and caught 22 passes for 290 yards and eight touchdowns.

== Professional career ==
Houmard was selected by the Pittsburgh Steelers in the 14th round of the 1969 NFL/AFL draft. He opted to instead sign with the Winnipeg Blue Bombers of the Canadian Football League. In 1970, Houmard rushed for 810 yards and eight touchdowns. After the season he was signed by the Montreal Alouettes, who traded him to the Edmonton Eskimos before the start of the season. Houmard was signed by the Toronto Argonauts in 1973 but did not make the team out of training camp.

Houmard was signed by the Memphis Southmen of the newly-founded World Football League (WFL) as a player-coach in 1974. He was moved to the tight end position and caught one pass for nine yards. Houmard suffered a career-ending injury from a tractor accident in 1974.

== Post-playing career ==
After the accident, Houmard moved to Florida and worked as a physical education teacher for the Polk County Public Schools until retiring in 2006. Houmard died on March 19, 2021.
