= Frank Peters (American football) =

American football player (born 1947)

No. 77
- Position: Tackle

Personal information
- Born: July 17, 1947 (age 79); Lockbourne, Ohio, U.S.
- Listed height: 6 ft 4 in (1.93 m)
- Listed weight: 250 lb (113 kg)

Career information
- High school: Hamilton Township (Columbus, Ohio)
- College: Ohio
- NFL draft: 1969: 9th round, 233rd overall pick

Career history
- New York Jets (1969)*; Cincinnati Bengals (1969)
- * Offseason or practice squad member only

Career NFL statistics
- Games played: 3
- Stats at Pro Football Reference

Frank D. Peters (born July 17, 1947) is an American former professional football player who was a tackle for one season with the Cincinnati Bengals of the American Football League (AFL). He played college football for the Ohio Bobcats.

== Early life and education ==
Frank Peters was born on July 17, 1947, in Lockbourne, Ohio. He attended Hamilton Township High School in Columbus, before playing college football for the Ohio Bobcats. He spent 1965 to 1968 at Ohio University, lettering from '66 to '68. Following his senior season, where he was co-captain of the team, Peters was named the school's "student-athlete of the year".

== Professional career ==
After his college career, Peters was selected with the 233rd pick of the 1969 NFL/AFL draft by the New York Jets. He was released at roster cuts and subsequently signed off waivers by the Cincinnati Bengals. With the Bengals he appeared in three games. Peters was released the next season, ending his professional career.
