= Larry Agajanian =

American football player (born 1946)

Profile
- Position: Defensive tackle

Personal information
- Born: October 24, 1946 (age 80); Orange, California, U.S.
- Listed height: 6 ft 3 in (1.91 m)
- Listed weight: 250 lb (113 kg)

Career information
- High school: Woodrow Wilson (Long Beach, CA)
- College: UCLA (1966–1968)

Awards and highlights
- First-team All-Pac-8 (1968)

Larry David Agajanian (born October 24, 1946) is an American former football player. He played at the defensive tackle position for the UCLA Bruins football team from 1966 to 1968. He was selected by the AP, UPI, and Pac-8 coaches as a first-team player on the 1968 All-Pacific-8 Conference football team. He was also selected in January 1969 as the Armenian American Intercollegiate Player of the Year. He was drafted by the Green Bay Packers in the seventh round (168th pick) of the 1969 NFL/AFL draft but did not appear in any regular season games with the club.

His father Ben Agajanian played professional football in the National Football League (NFL) and American Football League (AFL) from 1945 to 1964.
