= Craig Koinzan =

American gridiron football player (born c. 1948)

No. 61
- Positions: Defensive end, Guard

Personal information
- Born: c. 1948 (age 77–78); Davenport, Nebraska, U.S.
- Listed height: 6 ft 4 in (1.93 m)
- Listed weight: 245 lb (111 kg)

Career information
- College: Doane
- NFL draft: 1969: 13th round, 324th overall pick

Career history
- 1969–1974: Calgary Stampeders
- 1974: Edmonton Eskimos

Awards and highlights
- Grey Cup champion (1971)

Craig Koinzan (born c. 1948) is an American former professional football player who played for the Calgary Stampeders and Edmonton Eskimos. He won the Grey Cup with Calgary in 1971. He played college football at Doane College in Crete, Nebraska.
