= Ray Hickl =

American football player (born 1946)

No. 57
- Position: Linebacker

Personal information
- Born: December 24, 1946 (age 79); Elmaton, Texas, U.S.
- Listed height: 6 ft 2 in (1.88 m)
- Listed weight: 220 lb (100 kg)

Career information
- High school: Tidehaven (Elmaton)
- College: Texas A&I
- NFL draft: 1969: 9th round, 223rd overall pick

Career history
- New York Giants (1969–1970); Long Island Bulls (1970)
- Stats at Pro Football Reference

Raymond William Hickl (born December 24, 1946) is an American former professional football linebacker who played for the New York Giants of the National Football League (NFL). He played college football for the Texas A&I Javelinas and was selected by the Giants in the ninth round of the 1969 NFL draft.

== Early life ==
Raymond William Hickl was born on December 24, 1946, in Elmaton, Texas. He grew up on an 100-acre farm. Hickl said he used to skip his chores to play football. He attended Tidehaven High School in Elmaton and made the high school football team his junior year. He played end, linebacker, and halfback.

== College career ==
Hickl played junior college football at Blinn College from 1965 to 1966. He transferred to Texas A&I University, where he was a two-year varsity letterman for the Texas A&I Javelinas from 1967 to 1968 as a corner linebacker, defensive end, and fullback. He was named the defensive team MVP.

== Professional career ==
Hickl was selected by the New York Giants in the ninth round, with the 223rd overall pick, of the 1969 NFL draft as a linebacker. The 1969 training camp roster listed Hickl at 220 pounds. The Herald-News noted that "the last time Ray weighed 220 pounds he was standing on scale in full uniform holding a blocking dummy in his arms." Giants head coach Allie Sherman said "Two-ten would be more like it. Early in camp we were hoping he wouldn't slip under 200." Sherman said if a player is quick and can hit hard, his weight does not necessarily matter. Hickl played in the first eight games of the season for the Giants, mostly on special teams, before injuring his knee in the eighth game. He then missed a few games before returning for the regular season finale, during which he injured his knee again and had to have surgery. Hickl played in the 1970 regular season opener and was then released on September 23, 1970.

Hickl then played for the Long Island Bulls of the Atlantic Coast Football League in 1970 and returned one punt for no yards.
