= John Woitt =

American football player (born 1946)

No. 48
- Position: Defensive back

Personal information
- Born: June 29, 1946 (age 80); Yakima, Washington, U.S.
- Listed height: 5 ft 11 in (1.80 m)
- Listed weight: 171 lb (78 kg)

Career information
- High school: Pascagoula (MS)
- College: Mississippi State
- NFL draft: 1968: undrafted

Career history
- San Francisco 49ers (1968–1969)

Career NFL statistics
- Games played: 28
- Games started: 4
- Interceptions: 1
- Interception touchdowns: 1
- Fumble recoveries: 2
- Stats at Pro Football Reference

John Merit Woitt (born June 29, 1946) is an American former professional football player who was a defensive back for the San Francisco 49ers of the National Football League (NFL). He played college football for the Mississippi State Bulldogs.

== College career ==
Woitt played college at Mississippi State. Woitt played running back in college. In his senior year, he ran 3 times for 60 yards. He also caught 8 passes for 82 yards and 2 touchdowns.

== Professional career ==
Woitt signed with the San Francisco 49ers as an undrafted free agent in 1968 and he was converted to a defensive back. In his rookie season, he played all 14 games and recovered 1 fumble. He remained with the 49ers for his second year. In his second year, he was a bit more involved and was a starter for 4 games. In week six of the season against the Baltimore Colts, he picked off the quarterback for a 57-yard touchdown in the 24-21 victory.
