= Tim McCann (American football) =

American football player (born 1947)

No. 74
- Position: Defensive tackle

Personal information
- Born: May 15, 1947; Milwaukee, Wisconsin
- Listed height: 6 ft 5 in (1.96 m)
- Listed weight: 265 lb (120 kg)

Career information
- High school: Central Catholic
- College: Princeton
- NFL draft: 1969: undrafted

Career history
- New York Giants (1969)
- Stats at Pro Football Reference

Tim McCann is a former defensive tackle in the National Football League. He was a member of the New York Giants during the 1969 NFL season.
