= Dave Bradley =

American football player (1947–2010)

No. 61, 55, 64
- Position: Guard

Personal information
- Born: February 13, 1947; Burnham, Pennsylvania, U.S.
- Died: October 1, 2010 (aged 63); Burnham, Pennsylvania, U.S.
- Listed height: 6 ft 4 in (1.93 m)
- Listed weight: 245 lb (111 kg)

Career information
- High school: Chief Logan (Lewistown, Pennsylvania)
- College: Penn State (1965-1968)
- NFL draft: 1969: 2nd round, 38th overall pick

Career history
- Green Bay Packers (1969–1971); St. Louis Cardinals (1972); Chicago Fire (1974)

Career NFL statistics
- Games played: 16
- Games started: 1
- Fumble recoveries: 1
- Stats at Pro Football Reference

Dave Bradley (February 13, 1947 – October 1, 2010) was an American professional football guard in the National Football League (NFL).

== Biography ==
Bradley was born David Earl Bradley on February 13, 1947, in Burnham, Pennsylvania. He died on October 1, 2010.

== Career ==
Bradley played at college level at Pennsylvania State University, where he played both guard and tackle. He was chosen as a tackle for the North squad for the 1969 Senior Bowl post-season game.

Bradley was drafted by the Green Bay Packers in the second round of the 1969 NFL/AFL draft and played his first three seasons with the team. During his final season in the NFL, he was a member of the St. Louis Cardinals. He also played for the Chicago Fire of the World Football League in 1974. He wore number 61 for the Packers, 55 for the Cardinals and 64 for the Fire.
