= Francis Winkler =

American football player (born 1946)

No. 58
- Position: Defensive end

Personal information
- Born: October 20, 1946 (age 80); Memphis, Tennessee, U.S.
- Listed height: 6 ft 3 in (1.91 m)
- Listed weight: 230 lb (104 kg)

Career information
- High school: Memphis Catholic
- College: Memphis State (1964-1967)
- NFL draft: 1968: 5th round, 137th overall pick

Career history
- Green Bay Packers (1968–1969)

Career NFL statistics
- Fumble recoveries: 1
- Stats at Pro Football Reference

Francis Michael Winkler (born October 20, 1946) is an American former professional football player who was a defensive end in the National Football League (NFL). Winkler was born on October 20, 1946, in Memphis, Tennessee, where he graduated from Memphis Catholic High School. After high school, he played college football for the Memphis State Tigers (now Memphis Tigers). By the end of his college career, he was identified as the best football prospect coming out of Memphis.

Winkler was selected 137th overall by the Green Bay Packers in the fifth round of the 1968 NFL/AFL draft. Prior to the start of his first year, he was identified as one of at least five rookies who were expected to start for the Packers during the pre-season. Winkler played 21 games for the Packers over two seasons. During his second season, in addition to his position on defense, Winkler also performed kick-offs and was the back-up field goal kicker. Prior to the start of the 1970 NFL season, the Packers traded Winkler to the Atlanta Falcons for Ken Mendenhall. After the trade, Winkler had surgery on his shoulder and was placed on the injured list. After sitting out the whole season, Winkler returned in 1971 but abruptly left training camp and decided to retire.
