= Gordon Rule =

American football player (born 1946)

No. 47
- Position: Defensive back

Personal information
- Born: March 1, 1946 (age 80); Columbus, Ohio, U.S.
- Listed height: 6 ft 2 in (1.88 m)
- Listed weight: 180 lb (82 kg)

Career information
- High school: Chandler (Chandler, Arizona)
- College: Dartmouth
- NFL draft: 1968: 11th round, 299th overall pick

Career history
- Green Bay Packers (1968–1969)

Career NFL statistics
- Games played: 15
- Stats at Pro Football Reference

Gordon Alan Rule (born March 1, 1946) is an American former professional football player who was a defensive back two seasons with the Green Bay Packers of the National Football League (NFL). He played college football for the Dartmouth Big Green.
