= 1969 Orange Bowl =

American college football game

- 35th Orange Bowl
- The Miami Orange Bowl in Miami, Florida, hosted the Orange Bowl.
Penn State Nittany Lions	Kansas Jayhawks
(10–0)	(9–1)
Independent	Big Eight
15	14
Head coach: Joe Paterno	Head coach: Pepper Rodgers
AP / Coaches; 3 / 3	AP / Coaches; 6 / 6
	1	2	3	4	Total
Penn State	0	7	0	8	15
Kansas	7	0	0	7	14
- Date: January 1, 1969
- Season: 1968
- Stadium: Orange Bowl
- Location: Miami, Florida
- MVP: Donnie Shanklin (Kansas HB)
- Favorite: Penn State by 3 points
- Referee: Earl Jansen (Big Eight) (split crew: Big Eight, ECAC)
- Attendance: 77,719

United States TV coverage
- Network: NBC
- Announcers: Jim Simpson, Al DeRogatis
- Nielsen ratings: 23.6

The 1969 Orange Bowl was the 35th edition of the college football bowl game, played at the Orange Bowl in Miami, Florida, on Wednesday, January 1. The final game of the 1968–69 bowl game season, it matched the independent third-ranked Penn State Nittany Lions and the #6 Kansas Jayhawks of the Big Eight Conference. Favored Penn State rallied to win with a late touchdown and two-point conversion, 15–14.

== Teams ==
=== Penn State ===
Penn State was going for their first undefeated season, though a national championship was unlikely due to being ranked third with #1 Ohio State and #2 USC matched up in the Rose Bowl. This was the Nittany Lions' first appearance in the Orange Bowl.

=== Kansas ===
The Jayhawks were co-champion of the Big Eight with Oklahoma, who went to the Astro-Bluebonnet Bowl. This was Kansas' first conference title since 1947, their first bowl game in seven years, and first Orange Bowl since 1948. Their only loss in the regular season was to Oklahoma by four points.

== Game summary ==
This was the fifth straight year for a night kickoff at the Orange Bowl, following the Rose Bowl. The temperature was 65 °F (18 °C).

Fullback Mike Reeves scored from two yards out to give Kansas the lead in the first quarter. Penn State tied the game at seven before halftime on halfback Charlie Pittman's thirteen-yard run.

After a scoreless third quarter, John Riggins gave the Jayhawks a 14–7 lead on his one-yard touchdown plunge. Kansas had another chance to score with the ball at Penn State's 14 on fourth down with one yard to go. Instead of kicking the field goal, they went for the first down, but Riggins was stuffed for no gain.

With 1:16 remaining, Kansas had fourth down on their own 25-yard line; a partially blocked punt gave the ball back to Penn State at the Penn State 49 yard line. On the next play wingback Bob Campbell caught a pass from quarterback Chuck Burkhart on a long play and was tackled at the three-yard line. After two runs for no gain, Burkhart bootlegged left to make it 14–13 with fifteen seconds remaining, and Penn State opted to go for the win with a two-point conversion attempt.

The conversion attempt was denied as Burkhart's pass to the right was batted down in the end zone, which prompted the Kansas fans to rush the field. But the game was not over, a penalty had been called on Kansas for twelve men on the field. On the second attempt, Campbell scored around left end and the two point conversion was successful, to give the Nittany Lions the one-point win.

=== Scoring ===
First quarter

- Kansas – Mike Reeves 2-yard run (Bill Bell kick)

Second quarter

- Penn State – Charlie Pittman 13-yard run (Rusty Garthwaite kick)

Third quarter
No scoring
Fourth quarter

- Kansas – John Riggins 1-yard run (Bell kick)
- Penn State – Chuck Burkhart 3-yard run (Bob Campbell run)

- 1/1/1969 Penn State vs. Kansas (Orange Bowl) on YouTube

== Statistics ==
Statistics	Penn State	Kansas
First downs	17	16
Rushing yards	55–207	59–76
Passing yards	154	165
Passes (C–A–I)	12–23–2	9–18–1
Total offense	78–361	77–241
Punts–average	9–38.1	10–38.3
Fumbles–lost	2–2	2–0
Turnovers	4	1
Penalties–yards	1–15	2–10

== Aftermath ==
Despite Riggins' return for his junior season, the graduations of quarterback Bobby Douglass and defensive end John Zook hurt the Jayhawks, and they won just once in 1969. The Jayhawks improved to 5-6 in 1970, Riggins' senior season and Rodgers' last in Lawrence before succeeding Tommy Prothro at UCLA.

Kansas did not have another winning season until 1973, and did not return to the Orange Bowl until January 2008.

Penn State returned to the Orange Bowl the following year, and won again, defeating Kansas' archrival, Missouri to complete another 11-0 season. When head coach Joe Paterno was later asked what football game was his favorite game of all time he answered, the 1969 Orange Bowl.
