= Vince Gibson =

American football player and coach (1933–2012)

- Gibson pictured in Jambalaya 1983, Tulane yearbook

Biographical details
- Born: March 27, 1933; Birmingham, Alabama, U.S.
- Died: January 10, 2012 (aged 78); Kenner, Louisiana, U.S.

Playing career
- 1954–1955: Florida State
- Position: Guard

Coaching career (HC unless noted)
- 1956–1958: South Georgia (assistant)
- 1959–1963: Florida State (assistant)
- 1964–1966: Tennessee (DC)
- 1967–1974: Kansas State
- 1975–1979: Louisville
- 1980–1982: Tulane
- 1992: New Orleans Night

Head coaching record
- Overall: 75–98–2 (college); 0–10 (AFL)
- Bowls: 0–2

Accomplishments and honors

Awards
- Big Eight Conference COY (1970)

Vince Gibson (March 27, 1933 – January 10, 2012) was an American football player and coach. He served as head football coach at Kansas State University (1967–1974), the University of Louisville (1975–1979), and Tulane University (1980–1982), compiling a career college football record of 75–98–2. In 1992, he coached the New Orleans Night of the Arena Football League, tallying a mark of 0–10.

== Early life and playing career ==
Gibson was born and raised in Birmingham, Alabama. He graduated from Florida State University in 1955, where he received two letters playing as an offensive guard for the Seminoles. He entered the coaching profession immediately after graduation.

== Coaching career ==
Gibson's first football coaching position was at South Georgia College in 1956, a position he held for three years. At South Georgia, Gibson served as the sole assistant under head coach Bobby Bowden, who had grown up in the same Birmingham neighborhood as Gibson. Following his stint at South Georgia, Gibson returned to his alma mater Florida State to work as an assistant coach from 1959 to 1963. Before leaving Florida State, Gibson also helped to get Bowden hired as an assistant at that school, where Bowden eventually became head coach. Gibson next served as defensive coordinator at the University of Tennessee from 1964 to 1966.

=== Kansas State ===
Prior to the 1967 football season, Gibson was hired as head coach at Kansas State University. When he was hired, the school was mired in a 21-game winless streak and had not enjoyed a winning season since 1954, but he promised the Wildcat fans, "We gonna win!"

Gibson's first season at Kansas State ended with a 1–9 record, but the next year the team showed significant improvement. Behind sophomore quarterback Lynn Dickey, the 1968 squad earned the school's first national ranking in the AP Poll and shut out Nebraska in Lincoln for the school's first victory over NU in a decade. That same season, Kansas State also moved into a new football stadium.

Gibson truly began to deliver on his promise to win during the 1969 season. The team started 2–0 before second-ranked Penn State arrived to play in Manhattan, Kansas. Penn State ultimately finished the 1969 season undefeated, but Kansas State provided them with one of their toughest tests in a 17–14 game. Following the loss to Penn State, Kansas State reeled off three straight victories, including a win over defending conference champion Kansas in the first Governor's Cup game, and a 59–21 blowout of No. 11 Oklahoma, which was Kansas State's first win over the Sooners since 1934 and the largest loss in Oklahoma's history. K-State did not beat another ranked team until 1993, when Bill Snyder led the team to victory over Oklahoma again. After the 1969 Oklahoma game, Kansas State sported a 5–1 record and a No. 12 national ranking in the AP Poll. This was the high-point of the season, as the team lost its last four games to finish 5–5. Nevertheless, in only his third season, Gibson had dramatically improved the program.

Prior to the 1970 season, Gibson was named the pre-season national coach of the year by Playboy Magazine. The season that followed was up-and-down but ultimately disappointing despite a winning record and a second-place finish in the Big Eight Conference. Kansas State won at Oklahoma and defeated eighth-ranked Colorado, but the season was soured by non-conference defeats and a blow-out loss to Nebraska in the final conference game of the year with the conference title on the line. The worst news of the season came on October 7, 1970, when the conference slapped the Wildcats with three years' probation for recruiting violations. Most seriously, the Wildcats were banned from bowl games and live television for one year. Gibson later said that the sanctions—the result of what he called an immature quarrel with Kansas coach Pepper Rodgers—destroyed his program.

Kansas State stagnated following the 1970 season, with Gibson's teams hovering below the .500 mark for the next four years. Quarterback Steve Grogan provided some excitement during the 1973 and 1974 seasons, but it was never enough to provide a winning record. Gibson decided to leave Kansas State following the 1974 season with a final record of 33–52.

=== Louisville and Tulane ===
Following his term at Kansas State, Gibson served as head football coach at the University of Louisville from 1975 to 1979. His record at Louisville was 25–29–2, and in 1977 he took the school to the third bowl game in its history, the second Independence Bowl. While at Louisville, Gibson coined the nickname "Red Rage" for the football team, a related carry over from the "Purple Pride" at K-State. While no longer used as a moniker for the football team, the term Red Rage has been used over the years for various organizations. Currently, the U of L Marching Band is introduced as the "RED RAGE!" Marching Band. NFL notables from Louisville during Gibson's tenure include Otis Wilson of the Chicago Bears and Dwayne Woodruff of the Pittsburgh Steelers and Joe Jacoby of the Washington Redskins and Mark Clayton of the Miami Dolphins.

From 1980 to 1982 Gibson coached at Tulane University, posting an overall record of 17–17. Gibson defeated LSU in two out of his three seasons at Tulane and also coached the Green Wave to an appearance in the 1980 Hall of Fame Classic. While at Tulane, Gibson was known as "Vegas Vince" for his risk taking play calling.

=== Awards ===
Gibson was named the Big Eight Conference Coach of the Year in 1970. He was also selected to coach the North squad in the 1971 North–South Shrine Game. Gibson is enshrined in the Alabama Sports Hall of Fame and the Kansas State University Athletics Hall of Fame.

== Death ==
Gibson died in 2012 in Kenner, Louisiana, suffering from amyotrophic lateral sclerosis. He was 78.

== Head coaching record ==
=== College ===
Year	Team	Overall	Conference	Standing	Bowl/playoffs
Kansas State Wildcats (Big Eight Conference) (1967–1974)
1967	Kansas State	1–9	0–7	8th	
1968	Kansas State	4–6	2–5	T–6th	
1969	Kansas State	5–5	3–4	5th	
1970	Kansas State	6–5	5–2	T–2nd	
1971	Kansas State	5–6	2–5	T–5th	
1972	Kansas State	3–8	1–6	8th	
1973	Kansas State	5–6	2–5	T–6th	
1974	Kansas State	4–7	1–6	T–7th	
Kansas State:		33–52	16–40		
Louisville Cardinals (NCAA Division I / I-A independent) (1975–1979)
1975	Louisville	2–9			
1976	Louisville	5–6			
1977	Louisville	7–4–1			L Independence
1978	Louisville	7–4			
1979	Louisville	4–6–1			
Louisville:		25–29–2			
Tulane Green Wave (NCAA Division I-A independent) (1980–1982)
1980	Tulane	7–5			L Hall of Fame Classic
1981	Tulane	6–5			
1982	Tulane	4–7			
Tulane:		17–17			
Total:		75–98–2			
