= 1968 Oklahoma Sooners football team =

American college football season

1968 Oklahoma Sooners football
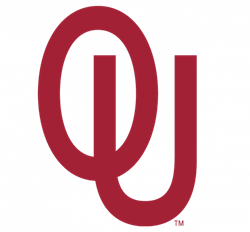

Big 8 co-champion

Astro-Bluebonnet Bowl, L 27–28 vs. SMU
- Conference: Big Eight Conference

Ranking
- Coaches: No. 10
- AP: No. 11
- Record: 7–4 (6–1 Big 8)
- Head coach: Chuck Fairbanks (2nd season)
- Offensive coordinator: Barry Switzer (3rd season)
- Captains: John Titsworth; Bob Warmack
- Home stadium: Oklahoma Memorial Stadium

1968 Big Eight Conference football standings
	Conf.					Overall
Team	W		L		T	W		L		T
No. 7 Kansas +	6	–	1	–	0	9	–	2	–	0
No. 11 Oklahoma +	6	–	1	–	0	7	–	4	–	0
No. 9 Missouri	5	–	2	–	0	8	–	3	–	0
Nebraska	3	–	4	–	0	6	–	4	–	0
Colorado	3	–	4	–	0	4	–	6	–	0
Kansas State	2	–	5	–	0	4	–	6	–	0
Oklahoma State	2	–	5	–	0	3	–	7	–	0
Iowa State	1	–	6	–	0	3	–	7	–	0
+ – Conference co-champions; Rankings from AP Poll

The 1968 Oklahoma Sooners football team represented the University of Oklahoma during the 1968 NCAA University Division football season. They played their home games at Oklahoma Memorial Stadium and competed as members of the Big Eight Conference. They were coached by head coach Chuck Fairbanks.

Although Oklahoma shared the Big Eight championship with Kansas and defeated the Jayhawks 27–23 on their home field, the Sooners were passed over by the Orange Bowl, which invited 9–1 Kansas.

== Schedule ==
Date	Opponent	Rank	Site	TV	Result	Attendance	Source
September 21	at No. 3 Notre Dame*	No. 5	Notre Dame Stadium; Notre Dame, IN		L 21–45	59,075	
September 28	NC State*		Oklahoma Memorial Stadium; Norman, OK		W 28–14	53,349	
October 12	vs. Texas*		Cotton Bowl; Dallas, TX (Red River Shootout)		L 20–26	71,837	
October 19	Iowa State		Oklahoma Memorial Stadium; Norman, OK		W 42–7	49,350	
October 26	at Colorado		Folsom Field; Boulder, CO		L 27–41	47,724	
November 2	Kansas State		Oklahoma Memorial Stadium; Norman, OK		W 35–20	36,700	
November 9	at No. 3 Kansas		Memorial Stadium; Lawrence, KS		W 27–23	51,500	
November 16	No. 6 Missouri		Oklahoma Memorial Stadium; Norman, OK (rivalry)		W 28–14	60,500	
November 23	Nebraska	No. 14	Oklahoma Memorial Stadium; Norman, OK (rivalry)	ABC	W 47–0	45,000	
November 30	at Oklahoma State	No. 11	Lewis Field; Stillwater, OK (Bedlam Series)		W 41–7	38,000	
December 31	vs. No. 20 SMU*	No. 10	Houston Astrodome; Houston, TX (Astro-Bluebonnet Bowl)	ABC	L 27–28	55,453	
*Non-conference game; Rankings from AP Poll released prior to the game

== Rankings ==
Ranking movements Legend: ██ Increase in ranking ██ Decrease in ranking — = Not ranked
	Week													
Poll	Pre	1	2	3	4	5	6	7	8	9	10	11	12	Final
AP	4	5	—	—	—	—	—	—	—	—	14	11	10	11

== Roster ==
1968 Oklahoma Sooners football team roster
Players
Coaches
Offense

Pos.	#	Name	Class
WB	33	Eddie Hinton	Jr
SE	88	Preshie Hodge	So
WB	37	Gary Jamar	So
TB	22	Marcellous Johnson	So
C	52	Joe Justice	So
WR	83	Joe Killingsworth	Jr
C	54	Bob Klitzman	So
C	50	Ken Mendenhall	Jr
RE	84	Jim Files	Jr
TB	36	Steve Owens	Jr
QB	11	Bob Warmack	Sr

Defense

Pos.	#	Name	Class
RE	84	Jim Files	Jr
DHB	26	Jerry Hetherington	So
DT	69	Randy Little	So
DHB	32	Rick Hetherington	Jr
LB	82	Steve Zabel	Jr

Special teams

Pos.	#	Name	Class

Head coach

- Chuck Fairbanks

Coordinators/assistant coaches

- Galen Hall (WR)
- Warren Harper (LB)
- Pat James
- Bill Michael (DE)
- Carl Nystrom
- Barry Switzer (OC)

Legend

- (C) Team captain
- (S) Suspended
- (I) Ineligible
- Injured
- Redshirt

Roster

== NFL/AFL draft ==
Eddie Hinton was drafted into the National Football League following the season.

Round	Pick	Player	Position	NFL team
1	25	Eddie Hinton	Wide receiver	Baltimore Colts
