= 1968 Nebraska Cornhuskers football team =

American college football season

1968 Nebraska Cornhuskers football
- Conference: Big Eight Conference
- Record: 6–4 (3–4 Big 8)
- Head coach: Bob Devaney (7th season)
- Defensive coordinator: George Kelly
- Home stadium: Memorial Stadium

1968 Big Eight Conference football standings
	Conf.					Overall
Team	W		L		T	W		L		T
No. 7 Kansas +	6	–	1	–	0	9	–	2	–	0
No. 11 Oklahoma +	6	–	1	–	0	7	–	4	–	0
No. 9 Missouri	5	–	2	–	0	8	–	3	–	0
Nebraska	3	–	4	–	0	6	–	4	–	0
Colorado	3	–	4	–	0	4	–	6	–	0
Kansas State	2	–	5	–	0	4	–	6	–	0
Oklahoma State	2	–	5	–	0	3	–	7	–	0
Iowa State	1	–	6	–	0	3	–	7	–	0
+ – Conference co-champions; Rankings from AP Poll

The 1968 Nebraska Cornhuskers football team represented the University of Nebraska in the 1968 NCAA University Division football season. The team was coached by Bob Devaney and played their home games in Memorial Stadium in Lincoln.

The Huskers were 6–4, but had a losing record in conference at 3–4. They lost three Big 8 games at home and were shut out 47–0 at Oklahoma in the season finale. Nebraska did not play in a bowl game for the second consecutive year; the next season without a bowl was 36 years later in 2004. The home shut out against Kansas State was the last time they have been shut out at home as of 2017 season.

Following 1968, Tom Osborne was promoted to offensive coordinator and installed the I formation offense. This led to a 9–2 record in 1969 and consecutive undefeated national championship seasons in 1970 and 1971.

== Schedule ==
Date	Time	Opponent	Rank	Site	TV	Result	Attendance	Source
September 14	2:00 pm	Wyoming*	No. 14	Memorial Stadium; Lincoln, NE		W 13–10	66,922	
September 21	2:00 pm	Utah*	No. 14	Memorial Stadium; Lincoln, NE		W 31–0	66,198	
September 28	1:30 pm	at No. 17 Minnesota*	No. 9	Memorial Stadium; Minneapolis, MN (rivalry)		W 17–14	55,362	
October 12	2:00 pm	No. 6 Kansas	No. 9	Memorial Stadium; Lincoln, NE (rivalry)		L 13–23	67,119	
October 19	2:00 pm	No. 20 Missouri	No. 13	Memorial Stadium; Lincoln, NE (rivalry)		L 14–16	66,289	
October 26	1:30 pm	at Oklahoma State		Lewis Field; Stillwater, OK		W 21–20	35,200	
November 2	2:00 pm	at Iowa State		Clyde Williams Field; Ames, IA (rivalry)		W 24–13	29,000	
November 9	2:00 pm	Kansas State^{†}		Memorial Stadium; Lincoln, NE (rivalry)		L 0–12	65,986	
November 16	2:30 pm	at Colorado		Folsom Field; Boulder, CO (rivalry)		W 22–6	48,327	
November 23	2:05 pm	at No. 14 Oklahoma		Oklahoma Memorial Stadium; Norman, OK (rivalry)	ABC	L 0–47	45,000	
*Non-conference game; ^{†}Homecoming; Rankings from AP Poll released prior to the game; All times are in Central time

== Roster ==
Ahlmann, Harold #21 (So.) LB; Anderson, Jim #18 (So.) RCB; Armstrong, Joe #65 (Sr.) RG; Ashman, Carl #53 (Jr.) C Avolio, Frank #40 (Jr.) DE; Beland, Ben #61 (So.) RG; Best, Bob #27 (Sr.) S Bomberger, Bill #46 (Jr.) HB; Boyd, David #17 (So.) QB; Brichacek, Mel #69 (Sr.) LG; Brown, Bill #44 (So.) FB; Buda, Joe #52 (Jr.) C Burdic, Mike #51 (So.) DT; Chandler, George #7 (So.) LB; Coppa, Rich #54 (So.) C Davis, Dick #45 (Sr.) FB; Decker, John #1 (So.) S Delaney, Dan #67 (Sr.) LG; DeOrio, Lonnie #78 (So.) DT; Drakulich, Ron #41 (Jr.) DT; Dvorsak, Tony #11 (So.) QB; Fiala, Adrian #32 (Jr.) LB; Ford, Dennis #66 (So.) RG; Frost, Larry #28 (Jr.) HB; Galbraith, Denis #63 (Jr.) MG; Geddes, Ken #37 (Jr.) LB; Green, Mike #34 (Jr.) HB; Grenfell, Bob #59 (So.) RT; Gutzman, Dennis #89 (So.) DE; Hacias, Greg #13 (So.) QB; Hansen, Ed #74 (Sr.) RT; Hardt, Bob #91 (So.) DE; Hartman, Dan #39 (Jr.) LB	Haskell, Charles #93 (So.) DE; Hawkins, James #26 (Sr.) RCB; Haynes, Ervin #9 (So.) LB; Heller, Tom #4 (So.) RCB; Hollstein, Gary #5 (So.) S Hopkins, John #95 (So.) DT; Hornbacher, Bill #55 (Jr.) MG; Ingles, Guy #88 (So.) SE; Jansen, Jim #35 (Jr.) S Jarmon, Sherwin #81 (Jr.) DE; Jennings, Henry #6 (So.) LCB; Kimmel, Miles #84 (Sr.) TE; Kobza, Dan #49 (Jr.) MG; Kontos, Ken #98 (So.) LB; Kusserow, Ken #73 (Jr.) DT; Lahey, Pat #47 (So.) DT; Larson, Al #20 (Jr.) LCB; Liggett, Bob #71 (Jr.) DT; Linstroth, Tom #62 (Sr.) DT; Logan, Bob #96 (So.) TE; Lowe, Rex #83 (So.) SE; Malone, Dan #79 (So.) DT; Mawhinney, Bob #50 (So.) C McClelland, Tom #16 (So.) S McFarland, Jim #80 (Jr.) TE; McGhee, Donnie #70 (So.) LT; Miller, Jim #92 (So.) DE; Minor, Mike #48 (Jr.) LB; Minor, Wilfred #14 (So.) LCB; Montgomery, Al #8 (So.) HB; Morock, David #43 (So.) LCB; Murtaugh, Jerry #42 (So.) LB; Newton, Clint #82 (So.) SE	Orduna, Joe #31 (Jr.) HB; Patrick, Frank #10 (Jr.) QB; Patterson, Glenn #72 (Jr.) LT; Penney, Tom #85 (Sr.) SE; Periard, Ed #56 (So.) MG; Quinten, Karl #38 (Jr.) DE; Reeves, Randy #25 (Jr.) S Rogers, Paul #30 (So.) HB; Sanders, Frank #2 (So.) RCB; Schenk, George #64 (So.) LT; Schneiss, Dan #22 (So.) FB; Sigler, Ernie #12 (Sr.) QB; Smith, Jim #23 (So.) HB; Stephenson, Dana #36 (Jr.) S Stigge, Russ #57 (Jr.) RG; Terwilliger, Marlin #3 (So.) S Tollefsen, Tay #86 (So.) TE; Topliff, Paul #87 (Jr.) TE; Vactor, Frank #19 (So.) HB; Vassar, Phil #33 (So.) FB; Volberding, Ron #97 (So.) RG; Walline, Dave #76 (So.) DT; Weber, Bruce #58 (So.) LG; Wenner, Rick #15 (So.) QB; Williams, Gale #77 (Jr.) RT; Winter, Wally #75 (So.) LT; Wittler, Don #94 (So.) RT; Wynn, Mike #90 (Jr.) DE; Yannon, Buster #24 (Jr.) FB; Young, Lynn #68 (Jr.) LG; Ziegler, Mick #29 (Sr.) HB

== Depth chart ==
Defensive starters

S
Bob Best
Randy Reeves
Tom McClelland

M
Al Larson
David Morock
Wilford Minor.

LB	LB
Ken Geddes	Jerry Murtaugh
Adrian Fiala	Dan Kobza
George Chandler	Dan Hartman

CB
Dana Stephenson
John Decker
Marlin Terwilliger

DE	DT	NT	DT	DE
Mike Wynn	Bob Liggett	Bill Hornbacher	Dave Walline	Sherwin Jarmon
Dennis Gutzman	Ron Drakulich	Tom Linstroth	Tom Linstroth	Frank Avolio
Chuck Haskell	Mike Burdic	Ed Periard	Ken Kusserow	Karl Quinten

CB
James Hawkins
Tom Heller
Jim Anderson

Offensive starters

TE
Jim McFarland
Paul Topliff
Miles Kimmel

LT	LG	C	RG	RT
Glenn Patterson	Mel Brichacek	Joe Buda	Joe Armstrong	Ed Hansen
Wally Winter	Dan Delaney	Carl Ashman	Gale Williams	Donnie McGhee
Bob Grenfell	Lynn Young	Bob Mawhinney	Dennis Ford.	Don Wittler

TE
Tom Penney
Guy Ingels
Rex Lowe

QB
Ernie Sigler
Frank Patrick
Tony Dvorsak

HB	RB	FB
Mick Ziegler	Joe Orduna	Dick Davis
Larry Frost	Mike Green	Dan Schneiss
Paul Rogers	Frank Vactor	Buster Yannon

== Coaching staff ==
Name	Title	First year in this position	Years at Nebraska	Alma mater
Bob Devaney	Head Coach	1962	1962–72	Alma
Tom Osborne	Offensive assistant	1964	1964–97	Hastings
George Kelly	Defensive coordinator	1960	1960–68	Notre Dame
Cletus Fischer	Offensive line	1960	1960–85	Nebraska
Carl Selmer	Offensive line	1962	1962–72	Wyoming
Jim Ross			1962–76	
John Melton	Tight ends, Wingbacks	1973	1962–88	Wyoming
Mike Corgan	Running backs	1962	1962–82	Notre Dame
Monte Kiffin	Graduate assistant	1966	1967–76	Nebraska
Jack Osberg	Graduate assistant	1968	1968	Augsburg

== Game summaries ==
=== Wyoming ===
Wyoming at #14 Nebraska [box score]

Team	1	2	3	4	Total
Wyoming	10	0	0	0	10
• #14 Nebraska	3	0	0	10	13

- Date: 1968-09-14
- Location: Memorial Stadium, Lincoln, Nebraska
- Game attendance: 66,922

At the end of the 1st quarter, Nebraska was trailing 3–10, and struggled to catch up for much of the game. Finally, five minutes into the 4th quarter, with the assistance of the Blackshirts who had held off any further scores from the Cowboys, the Cornhuskers managed to get another touchdown to tie the game. Then, as time was running out and the Nebraska offensive effort was stalling, Nebraska PK Paul Rogers launched a 51-yard field goal through the uprights and into the stands for the win, leading to an exuberant mob of fans rushing the field in celebration.

=== Utah ===
Utah at #14 Nebraska [box score]

Team	1	2	3	4	Total
Utah	0	0	0	0	0
• #14 Nebraska	17	7	0	7	31

- Date: 1968-09-21
- Location: Memorial Stadium, Lincoln, Nebraska
- Game attendance: 66,198

The Cornhuskers tallied 518 yards of total offense while holding the Utes to just 138, 46 of which were on the ground, and had little trouble with Utah, holding them scoreless in Memorial Stadium.

=== Minnesota ===
#9 Nebraska at #17 Minnesota [box score]

Team	1	2	3	4	Total
• #9 Nebraska	0	7	0	10	17
#17 Minnesota	7	7	0	0	14

- Date: 1968-09-28
- Location: Memorial Stadium, Minneapolis
- Game attendance: 53,362

It seemed like a repeat of the first game of the year, as once again Nebraska started out behind and wasn't able to catch up again until the 4th quarter, and once again Nebraska PK Paul Rogers booted the game-winning field goal at the end of the 4th quarter with just 1:32 remaining on the clock to secure the win against national co-champion Minnesota.

=== Kansas ===
#6 Kansas at #9 Nebraska [box score]

Team	1	2	3	4	Total
• #6 Kansas	0	0	9	14	23
#9 Nebraska	0	6	0	7	13

- Date: 1968-10-12
- Location: Memorial Stadium, Lincoln, Nebraska
- Game attendance: 68,128

The highly regarded Kansas Jayhawks had been averaging 51 points per game, yet the Blackshirts managed to bottle them up to just 23 points, though Nebraska's 13 points were not enough to get the conference-opening win. Kansas managed to escape Lincoln with a victory only by scrambling to put up two touchdowns in the final 4 minutes. This was the last time Nebraska lost to the Jayhawks until the 2005 season; they won the next 36 meetings. It also is, through the 2022 season, their last home loss to Kansas to date.

=== Missouri ===
#20 Missouri at #13 Nebraska [box score]

Team	1	2	3	4	Total
• #20 Missouri	6	10	0	0	16
#13 Nebraska	7	0	7	0	14

- Date: 1968-10-19
- Location: Memorial Stadium, Lincoln, Nebraska
- Game attendance: 66,818

Nebraska was severely hampered by a day of mistakes, losing four fumbles, an interception, and suffering two punt receptions muffed and recovered by Missouri. Despite the tall odds presented by these burdens, the Cornhuskers dropped the game to the Tigers by only 2 points.

=== Oklahoma State ===
Nebraska at Oklahoma State [box score]

Team	1	2	3	4	Total
• Nebraska	0	0	7	14	21
Oklahoma State	0	0	14	6	20

- Date: 1968-10-26
- Location: Lewis Field, Stillwater, Oklahoma
- Game attendance: 35,000

The first half was scoreless as both teams struggled unsuccessfully for an edge, but Oklahoma State found a way through and scored the first 14 in the 3rd. Nebraska fought back, and once again Cornhusker PK Paul Rogers scored the game-winner off his foot with PAT in the final minute to put Nebraska ahead by 1.

=== Iowa State ===
Nebraska at Iowa State [box score]

Team	1	2	3	4	Total
• Nebraska	7	14	0	3	24
Iowa State	0	7	0	6	13

- Date: 1968-11-02
- Location: Clyde Williams Field, Ames, Iowa
- Game attendance: 29,000

Iowa State helped to spot Nebraska with an early 14–0 lead by losing an early fumble and never recovered from the setback. The Cyclones made a feeble late attempt, coming within 8 points before the Cornhuskers put up another field goal to finish them off.

=== Kansas State ===
Kansas State at Nebraska [box score]

Team	1	2	3	4	Total
• Kansas State	6	0	0	6	12
Nebraska	0	0	0	0	0

- Date: 1968-11-09
- Location: Memorial Stadium, Lincoln, Nebraska
- Game attendance: 67,466

Nebraska was stunned at home, at their homecoming game, when Kansas State held the Cornhuskers to just 146 total yards, 78 on the ground, and slapped Nebraska with only their second shutout under Head Coach Bob Devaney. This was the Cornhuskers last loss to the Wildcats until 1998 and their last home loss to them until 2003.

=== Colorado ===
Nebraska at Colorado [box score]

Team	1	2	3	4	Total
• Nebraska	12	3	7	0	22
Colorado	0	0	6	0	6

- Date: 1968-11-16
- Location: Folsom Field, Boulder, Colorado
- Game attendance: 48,327

Nebraska flashed with some vengeance in response to the previous week's shutout, running out ahead of Colorado in Boulder 22–0 with help from a 62-yard punt return touchdown, finally letting the Buffaloes on the board with just 2 minutes remaining to play.

=== Oklahoma ===
Nebraska at #14 Oklahoma [box score]

Team	1	2	3	4	Total
Nebraska	0	0	0	0	0
• #14 Oklahoma	7	21	0	19	47

- Date: 1968-11-23
- Location: Oklahoma Memorial Stadium, Norman, Oklahoma
- Game attendance: 45,000

Oklahoma denied Nebraska's bid for a post-season bowl game, as the Sooners scored five touchdowns to set a new Big 8 record and handed NU its worst defeat of the Devaney era with a painful 47–0 shutout in Norman.

== Rankings ==
Ranking movements Legend: ██ Increase in ranking ██ Decrease in ranking — = Not ranked
	Week													
Poll	Pre	1	2	3	4	5	6	7	8	9	10	11	12	Final
AP	14	14	2	7	9	13	—	—	—	—	—	—	—	—
Coaches														—

== Awards ==
Award	Name(s)
All America; 1st team	Joe Armstrong
All-America honorable mention	Mel Brichacek, Ken Geddes, Dana Stephenson
All-Big Eight; 1st team	Joe Armstrong, Ken Geddes, Dana Stephenson
All-Big Eight; 2nd team	Bob Best, Joe Orduna
All-Big Eight honorable mention	Bob Best, Mel Brichacek, Dick Davis, Adrian Fiala, Ed Hansen, Jim Hawkins, Al Larson, Bob Liggett, Jerry Murtaugh, Tom Penney, Paul Rogers, Mike Wynn

== 1968 Team Players in the NFL (& AFL) ==
The 1968 Nebraska Cornhuskers seniors selected in the 1969 Common draft (NFL-AFL):

Player	Position	Round	Pick	Franchise
James Hawkins	DB	7	177	Los Angeles Rams
Dick Davis	RB	12	306	Cleveland Browns

The 1968 Nebraska Cornhuskers juniors selected in the following year's 1970 NFL draft:

Player	Position	Round	Pick	Franchise
Jim McFarland	TE	7	164	St. Louis Cardinals
Ken Geddes	LB	7	175	Detroit Lions
Dana Stephenson	DB	8	183	Chicago Bears
Mike Wynn	DE	8	206	Oakland Raiders
Frank Patrick	QB	10	251	Green Bay Packers
Bob Liggett	DT	15	390	Kansas City Chiefs
Mike Green	RB	16	406	San Diego Chargers
Glenn Patterson	C	17	439	Dallas Cowboys

The 1968 Nebraska Cornhuskers sophomores selected in the 1971 NFL draft:

Player	Position	Round	Pick	Franchise
Joe Orduna	RB	2	49	San Francisco 49ers
Bob Newton	T	3	71	Chicago Bears
Paul Rogers	K–DB	8	190	Pittsburgh Steelers
Dan Schneiss	TE	11	261	Boston Patriots

Members of the 1968 Nebraska freshman team selected in the 1972 NFL draft:

Player	Position	Round	Pick	Franchise
Jerry Tagge	QB	1	11	Green Bay Packers
Jeff Kinney	RB	1	23	Kansas City Chiefs
Larry Jacobson	DT	1	24	New York Giants
Carl Johnson	T	5	112	New Orleans Saints
Van Brownson	QB	8	204	Baltimore Colts
Keith Wortman	G	10	242	Green Bay Packers

=== NFL and pro players ===
The following 1968 Nebraska players joined a professional team as draftees or free agents.

Name	Team
Dick Davis	Cleveland Browns
Ken Geddes	Los Angeles Rams
Sherwin Jarmon	Chicago Fire
Bob Liggett	Kansas City Chiefs
Jim McFarland	St. Louis Cardinals
Joe Orduna	New York Giants
Frank Patrick	Green Bay Packers
Frank Vactor	Washington Redskins
