= 1968 Kansas Jayhawks football team =

American college football season

1968 Kansas Jayhawks football

Big 8 co-champion

Orange Bowl, L 14–15 vs. Penn State
- Conference: Big Eight Conference

Ranking
- Coaches: No. 6
- AP: No. 7
- Record: 9–2 (6–1 Big 8)
- Head coach: Pepper Rodgers (2nd season)
- Captain: John Zook
- Home stadium: Memorial Stadium

1968 Big Eight Conference football standings
	Conf.					Overall
Team	W		L		T	W		L		T
No. 7 Kansas +	6	–	1	–	0	9	–	2	–	0
No. 11 Oklahoma +	6	–	1	–	0	7	–	4	–	0
No. 9 Missouri	5	–	2	–	0	8	–	3	–	0
Nebraska	3	–	4	–	0	6	–	4	–	0
Colorado	3	–	4	–	0	4	–	6	–	0
Kansas State	2	–	5	–	0	4	–	6	–	0
Oklahoma State	2	–	5	–	0	3	–	7	–	0
Iowa State	1	–	6	–	0	3	–	7	–	0
+ – Conference co-champions; Rankings from AP Poll

The 1968 Kansas Jayhawks football team represented the University of Kansas in the Big Eight Conference during the 1968 NCAA University Division football season. In their second season under head coach Pepper Rodgers, the Jayhawks compiled a 9–2 record (6–1 against conference opponents), tied with Oklahoma for the Big Eight Conference championship, lost to Penn State in the 1969 Orange Bowl, and outscored opponents by a combined total of 394 to 190. They played their home games at Memorial Stadium in Lawrence, Kansas.

The team's statistical leaders included Bobby Douglass with 1,316 passing yards, John Riggins with 866 rushing yards and George McGowan with 592 receiving yards. John Zook was the team captain.

Quarterback Bobby Douglass finished seventh in Heisman Trophy voting, receiving nine first-place votes.

Kansas did not beat the Nebraska Cornhuskers again until the 2005 season. The 1968 victory remains the last for Kansas in Lincoln, Nebraska. The Jayhawks' Big 8 title for the season, as of the 2026 season, remains their most recent conference title.

== Schedule ==
Date	Opponent	Rank	Site	TV	Result	Attendance	Source
September 21	at Illinois*		Memorial Stadium; Champaign, IL		W 47–7	46,359	
September 28	No. 13 Indiana*	No. 12	Memorial Stadium; Lawrence, KS		W 38–20	44,000	
October 5	New Mexico*	No. 8	Memorial Stadium; Lawrence, KS		W 68–7	21,000	
October 12	at No. 9 Nebraska	No. 6	Memorial Stadium; Lincoln, NE (rivalry)		W 23–13	67,119	
October 19	Oklahoma State	No. 4	Memorial Stadium; Lawrence, KS		W 49–14	36,000	
October 26	at Iowa State	No. 3	Clyde Williams Field; Ames, IA		W 46–25	26,000	
November 2	Colorado^{†}	No. 3	Memorial Stadium; Lawrence, KS		W 27–14	44,500	
November 9	Oklahoma	No. 3	Memorial Stadium; Lawrence, KS		L 23–27	51,500	
November 16	at Kansas State	No. 7	KSU Stadium; Manhattan, KS (Sunflower Showdown)		W 38–29	36,000	
November 23	at No. 13 Missouri	No. 7	Memorial Stadium; Columbia, MO (Border War)		W 21–19	62,200	
January 1	vs. No. 3 Penn State*	No. 6	Miami Orange Bowl; Miami, FL (Orange Bowl)	NBC	L 14–15	77,719	
*Non-conference game; ^{†}Homecoming; Rankings from AP Poll released prior to the game

== Roster ==
1968 Kansas Jayhawks football team roster
Players
Coaches
Offense

Pos.	#	Name	Class
G	67	Dave Aikens	So
RB	40	Willie Amison	So
OT	70	Larry Brown	So
OT	76	Keith Christensen	Sr
OT	72	Grant Dahl	Jr
QB	10	Bobby Douglass	Sr
QB	11	Jim Ettinger	Jr
C	55	Dale Evans	Jr
WR	43	Jim Hatcher	Sr
WR	28	John Jackson	Sr
TE	82	Lloyd Martindale	So
WR	81	George McGowan	Jr
TE	88	John Mosier	Jr
RB	45	Mike Reeves	Jr
RB	32	John Riggins	So
RB	21	Junior Riggins	Sr
FB	35	Rich Rucker	So
RB	23	Donnie Shanklin	Sr
G	65	Ken Wertzberger	Sr

Defense

Pos.	#	Name	Class
LB	53	Rick Abernethy	Sr
DB	27	Tom Anderson	Sr
DT	71	Jim Bailey	Jr
DB	20	Tom Ball	Sr
LB	62	Mickey Doyle	Sr
LB	60	Emery Hicks	Jr
DB	19	Dale Holt	So
DB	18	Bill Hunt	So
DL	74	Rudy Jacobcic	Jr
DB	26	Skip James	So
OT	73	Steve Lawson	So
DB	25	Keith Lieppman	So
DB	31	Dave Morgan	Sr
DL	79	Karl Salb	So
DL	61	Orville Turgeon	Sr
DE	84	Vernon Vanoy	Sr
DE	81	John Zook	Sr

Special teams

Pos.	#	Name	Class
K	12	Bill Bell	Jr

Head coach

- Pepper Rodgers

Coordinators/assistant coaches

- John Cooper
- Terry Donahue
- Dick Tomey
- Don Fambrough
- Dave McClain

Legend

- (C) Team captain
- (S) Suspended
- (I) Ineligible
- Injured
- Redshirt
