= 1968 Kansas State Wildcats football team =

American college football season

1968 Kansas State Wildcats football
- Conference: Big Eight Conference
- Record: 4–6 (2–5 Big 8)
- Head coach: Vince Gibson (2nd season)
- Home stadium: KSU Stadium

1968 Big Eight Conference football standings
	Conf.					Overall
Team	W		L		T	W		L		T
No. 7 Kansas +	6	–	1	–	0	9	–	2	–	0
No. 11 Oklahoma +	6	–	1	–	0	7	–	4	–	0
No. 9 Missouri	5	–	2	–	0	8	–	3	–	0
Nebraska	3	–	4	–	0	6	–	4	–	0
Colorado	3	–	4	–	0	4	–	6	–	0
Kansas State	2	–	5	–	0	4	–	6	–	0
Oklahoma State	2	–	5	–	0	3	–	7	–	0
Iowa State	1	–	6	–	0	3	–	7	–	0
+ – Conference co-champions; Rankings from AP Poll

The 1968 Kansas State Wildcats football team represented Kansas State University in the 1968 NCAA University Division football season. The team's head football coach was Vince Gibson. The Wildcats played their home games in KSU Stadium.

1968 was a significant year in Wildcat football history. KSU Stadium debuted as the new home for the football team, which moved from Memorial Stadium. The team was led by sophomore quarterback Lynn Dickey and finished the season as the best passing offense in the Big Eight.

1968 was also significant for the fact that the Wildcats were ranked for only the second time in school history (the first since 1953), and for the first time in the AP Poll. The team was ranked #20 going in its game against #4 Penn State. Wildcats went on to lose the game, 25–9, and would not be ranked the rest of the season, although they would return to the rankings in the 1969 season.

1968 was also the last time the Wildcats beat Nebraska until the 1998 season, and the last time K-State beat Nebraska in Lincoln until 2003.

== Schedule ==
Date	Opponent	Site	TV	Result	Attendance	Source
September 21	Colorado State*	KSU Stadium; Manhattan, KS		W 21–0	22,641	
September 28	at No. 4 Penn State*	Beaver Stadium; University Park, PA		L 9–25	45,024	
October 5	at Virginia Tech*	Lane Stadium; Blacksburg, VA		W 34–19	19,000	
October 12	Iowa State	KSU Stadium; Manhattan, KS (rivalry)		L 14–23	32,000	
October 19	at Colorado	Folsom Field; Boulder, CO (rivalry)		L 14–37	30,500	
October 26	No. 14 Missouri	KSU Stadium; Manhattan, KS		L 20–56	28,000	
November 2	at Oklahoma	Oklahoma Memorial Stadium; Norman, OK		L 20–35	36,700	
November 9	at Nebraska	Memorial Stadium; Lincoln, NE (rivalry)		W 12–0	65,986	
November 16	No. 7 Kansas^{†}	KSU Stadium; Manhattan, KS (rivalry)	ABC	L 29–38	36,000	
November 23	Oklahoma State	KSU Stadium; Manhattan, KS		W 21–14	18,000	
*Non-conference game; ^{†}Homecoming; Rankings from AP Poll released prior to the game

== Roster ==
1968 Kansas State Wildcats football team roster
Players
Coaches
Offense

Pos.	#	Name	Class
RB	36	Larry Brown	Sr
WR	40	Charlie Collins	Jr
QB	11	Lynn Dickey	So
G	76	Ira Gordon	Jr
RB	42	Mack Herron	Sr
WR	81	Dave Jones	Sr
G	65	Mike Kuhn	So
OT	75	Lynn Larson	Sr
WR	44	Bob Long	So
RB	23	Mike Montgomery	So
QB	10	Bill Nossek	Sr
G	79	Dean Shaternick	So
TE	80	Forrest Wells	So
WR	88	Sonny Yarnell	So

Defense

Pos.	#	Name	Class
DB	20	Ron Dickerson	So
LB	54	Jim Dukelow	So
DE	82	Bill Kennedy	Sr
LB	57	Randy Ross	Jr
DB	26	Clarence Scott	So

Special teams

Pos.	#	Name	Class

Head coach

- Vince Gibson

Coordinators/assistant coaches

- Dick Steinberg – Offensive backs
- Dean Pryor – Wide receiver
- Don Powell – Offensive line
- Jerry Elliott – Defensive line
- Bob Frazier – Defensive ends
- Sam Robertson – Linebackers
- Jesse Branch – Defensive backs

Legend

- (C) Team captain
- (S) Suspended
- (I) Ineligible
- Injured
- Redshirt
