= 1968 Colorado Buffaloes football team =

American college football season

1968 Colorado Buffaloes football
- Conference: Big Eight Conference
- Record: 4–6 (3–4 Big 8)
- Head coach: Eddie Crowder (6th season)
- Offensive coordinator: Chet Franklin
- Offensive scheme: Switching T / Slot-I triple option
- Defensive coordinator: Don James (1st season)
- Base defense: 5–2
- MVP: Mike Schnitker
- Captains: Rocky Martin; Mike Montler; Mike Schnitker
- Home stadium: Folsom Field

1968 Big Eight Conference football standings
	Conf.					Overall
Team	W		L		T	W		L		T
No. 7 Kansas +	6	–	1	–	0	9	–	2	–	0
No. 11 Oklahoma +	6	–	1	–	0	7	–	4	–	0
No. 9 Missouri	5	–	2	–	0	8	–	3	–	0
Nebraska	3	–	4	–	0	6	–	4	–	0
Colorado	3	–	4	–	0	4	–	6	–	0
Kansas State	2	–	5	–	0	4	–	6	–	0
Oklahoma State	2	–	5	–	0	3	–	7	–	0
Iowa State	1	–	6	–	0	3	–	7	–	0
+ – Conference co-champions; Rankings from AP Poll

The 1968 Colorado Buffaloes football team represented the University of Colorado in the Big Eight Conference during the 1968 NCAA University Division football season. Led by sixth-year head coach Eddie Crowder, Colorado finished the regular season at 4–6 (3–4 in Big 8, fourth), and played their home games on campus at Folsom Field in Boulder, Colorado.

Colorado featured 18 sophomores on the two-deep depth chart and endured an up-and-down season, including the second straight win over Oklahoma in Boulder to improve to 4–2, but then lost four straight in November to conclude the season. The finale was the first loss to Air Force in five years; the Falcons finished at 7–3.

This was the Buffs' first losing season in four years; their next came five years later.

== Schedule ==
Date	Opponent	Site	TV	Result	Attendance	Source
September 21	Oregon*	Folsom Field; Boulder, CO		W 28–7	44,723	
September 28	at California*	California Memorial Stadium; Berkeley, CA	ABC	L 0–10	37,500	
October 5	at Iowa State	Clyde Williams Field; Ames, IA		W 28–18	24,000	
October 12	at Missouri	Memorial Stadium; Columbia, MO		L 14–27	50,705	
October 19	Kansas State	Folsom Field; Boulder, CO (rivalry)		W 37–14	30,500	
October 26	Oklahoma^{†}	Folsom Field; Boulder, CO		W 41–27	47,724	
November 2	at No. 3 Kansas	Memorial Stadium; Lawrence, KS		L 14–27	44,500	
November 9	at Oklahoma State	Lewis Field; Stillwater, OK		L 17–34	17,000	
November 16	Nebraska	Folsom Field; Boulder, CO (rivalry)		L 6–22	48,327	
November 23	Air Force*	Folsom Field; Boulder, CO		L 35–58	42,300	
*Non-conference game; ^{†}Homecoming; Rankings from AP Poll released prior to the game

== Roster ==
1968 Colorado Buffaloes football team roster
Players
Coaches
Offense

Pos.	#	Name	Class
QB/RB	11	Bobby Anderson	Jr
HB	25	Steve Engel

Defense

Pos.	#	Name	Class
LB/DE		Mike Schnitker	Sr

Special teams

Pos.	#	Name	Class

Head coach

- Eddie Crowder (6th year)

Coordinators/assistant coaches

- Chet Franklin – Offensive coordinator
- Augie Tammariello – Offensive line
- Rick Duval – Wide receivers
- Don James – Defensive coordinator
- Steve Ortmayer – Defensive line
- Jim Mora – Defensive ends/outside linebackers/defensive backs
- Steve Sidwell – Linebackers
- Ken Blair – Outside linebacker
- Pat Culpepper – Assistant

Legend

- (C) Team captain
- (S) Suspended
- (I) Ineligible
- Injured
- Redshirt

Roster
