= Keith Christensen =

American gridiron football player (1947–2023)

No. 64
- Position: Offensive tackle

Personal information
- Born: May 10, 1947; Concordia, Kansas, U.S.
- Died: February 17, 2023 (aged 75); Concordia, Kansas, U.S.

Career information
- High school: Concordia Jr-Senior Highschool
- College: Kansas
- NFL draft: 1969: 5th round, 117th overall pick

Career history
- New Orleans Saints (1969); Edmonton Eskimos (1970–1971)

Awards and highlights
- First-team All-Big Eight (1968)

Keith Elmore "Pinky" Christensen (May 10, 1947 – February 17, 2023) was an American college and professional football player. Christensen played at offensive tackle at the University of Kansas where he was coached first by Jack Mitchell and later by Pepper Rodgers.

Christensen was drafted 117th overall by the New Orleans Saints in the fifth round of the 1969 NFL/AFL draft. He was the 117th player drafted overall. He then went to the Edmonton Eskimos where he played for the 1970 and 1971 seasons.

He married Jane M McConahey on August 3, 1968. After his retirement from professional football, he returned to his hometown of Concordia, Kansas, where he played high school football at Concordia Junior-Senior High School.
