= Jim Anderson (American football) =

American football player and coach (born 1947)

Biographical details
- Born: February 23, 1947

Playing career
- 1965–1968: Missouri
- Position: Guard

Coaching career (HC unless noted)
- 1972–1974: Missouri (assistant)
- 1976–1981: Rolla HS (MO)
- 1981–1983: Stanford (RB)
- 1983–1985: Northeast Missouri State (OC)
- 1986–1989: Indiana State (OL)
- 1990: Cape Girardeau Central HS (MO)
- 1991: Missouri–Rolla (OC)
- 1992–1998: Missouri–Rolla

Accomplishments and honors

Awards
- Third-team All-American (1968); First-team All-Big Eight (1968)

Jim Anderson (born February 23, 1947) is an American former football player and coach. He served as the head football coach at the University of Missouri at Rolla—now known as the Missouri University of Science and Technology—from 1992 to 1998. Anderson played college football at the University of Missouri and was selected 107th overall in the fifth round by the Philadelphia Eagles in the 1969 NFL/AFL draft.

== Head coaching record ==
Year	Team	Overall	Conference	Standing	Bowl/playoffs
Missouri–Rolla Miners (Mid-America Intercollegiate Athletics Association) (1992–1998)
1992	Missouri–Rolla	2–9	1–8	T–9th	
1993	Missouri–Rolla	3–7	2–7	T–8th	
1994	Missouri–Rolla	5–5–1	4–4–1	6th	
1995	Missouri–Rolla	1–9	1–8	10th	
1996	Missouri–Rolla	3–8	1–8	9th	
1997	Missouri–Rolla	3–8	2–7	T–8th	
1998	Missouri–Rolla	3–8	2–7	9th	
Missouri–Rolla:		20–54–1	13–49–1		
Total:		20–54–1			
