= Huscher, Kansas =

Unincorporated community in Cloud County, Kansas

Coordinates: 39°31′27″N 97°35′21″W

Huscher is an unincorporated community in Cloud County, Kansas, United States. It is located a few miles southeast of Concordia on Oat Rd next to a railroad.

== History ==
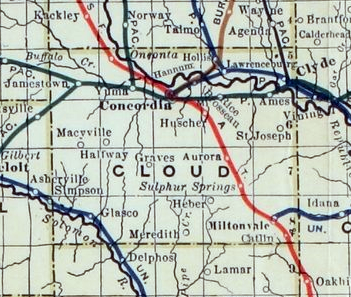
1915 railroad map of Cloud County

In 1887, Atchison, Topeka and Santa Fe Railway built a branch line from Neva (three miles west of Strong City) through Huscher to Superior, Nebraska. Huscher then became a shipping point of some importance. In 1996, the Atchison, Topeka and Santa Fe Railway merged with Burlington Northern Railroad and renamed to the current BNSF Railway. Most locals still refer to this railroad as the "Santa Fe".

Huscher had a post office from 1892 until it closed in 1914. It was re-established in 1915, and closed permanently in 1934.

== Education ==
The community is served by Concordia USD 333 public school district.
