= Donnie Shanklin =

American football player (1946–2009)

Profile
- Positions: Running back, wide receiver

Personal information
- Born: November 3, 1946; Amarillo, Texas, U.S.
- Died: August 30, 2009 (aged 62)
- Listed height: 5 ft 9 in (1.75 m)
- Listed weight: 175 lb (79 kg)

Career information
- High school: George Washington Carver (Amarillo)
- College: Kansas
- NFL draft: 1969: 10th round, 243rd overall pick

Career history
- Philadelphia Eagles (1969)*; BC Lions (1969); Jersey Jays (1970); Bridgeport Jets (1971, 1973); Philadelphia Bell (1974)
- * Offseason or practice squad member only

Awards and highlights
- 2× All-ACFL (1971, 1973); 2× Second-team All-Big Eight (1966, 1968); 1969 Orange Bowl MVP

Donald Percel Shanklin (November 3, 1946 – August 8, 2009) was an American professional football running back and wide receiver. He played college football at Kansas.

== College career ==
Shanklin was a three-year letter winner for the Kansas Jayhawks. As a sophomore, he led the Jayhawks with 732 rushing yards on 182 carries with two touchdowns. As a senior, he rushed for 772 yards and eight touchdowns while also catching four passes for 65 yards and one touchdown. Shanklin was named the MVP of the 1969 Orange Bowl, his final collegiate game, gaining 122 all-purpose yards in a 15-14 loss to Penn State.

== Professional career ==
Shanklin was selected in the 10th round of the 1969 NFL/AFL draft by the Philadelphia Eagles. He was cut during training camp. He was then signed by the BC Lions of the Canadian Football League. In 1970 Shanklin joined the Jersey Jays on the minor league Atlantic Coast Football League and changed positions wide receiver, catching 44 passes for a league-leading 1,023 yards and six touchdowns. He set a league record with 314 receiving yards and five touchdown receptions on October 10, 1970 against the Richmond Saints. Shanklin was signed by the ACFL's Bridgeport Jets where he played in 1971 and 1973 and was named All-ACFL in both seasons. Shanklin was signed by the Philadelphia Bell of the World Football League.

== Personal ==
After retiring from football, Shanklin became a professional golfer. His younger brother, Ronnie Shanklin, was a Pro Bowl wide receiver for the Pittsburgh Steelers. Shanklin died on August 30, 2009.
