= Concordia Junior-Senior High School =

Secondary school in Concordia, Kansas

- View from the southwest, 2008

Location
- 436 West 10th Street; Concordia, Kansas 66901; United States; 39.5670°N 97.6655°W

Information
- School type: Public, High School
- School board: Board Website
- School district: Concordia USD 333
- CEEB code: 170655
- Grades: 7-12
- Enrollment: 503 (2023-2024)
- Colors: Red and white
- Team name: Panthers
- Website: School Website

Concordia Junior-Senior High School is a public secondary school in Concordia, Kansas, United States. It is operated by Concordia USD 333 school district, and serves students of grades 7 to 12. It is called the "Junior-Senior" high school because the junior high school (grades 7–8) and senior high school (grades 9-12) are housed in the same building complex.

== Facilities ==
Harold M. Clark Stadium, 2007

The junior high and senior high for the district are housed in the same building but are run as separate schools. Each "school" has its own principal and academic teaching departments. Functionally the two schools are different but simply housed in the same building. Shared facilities include the cafeteria, the music rooms, and gymnasiums. The school also has an indoor swimming pool. Additionally, selected teachers do "cross-over" between junior and senior high classes (such as music and art instruction), but the administration seeks to keep the practice to a minimum.

The junior high students normally enter the building from the southeast entrance while the high school students enter the building from multiple entrances on the west side of the complex. This is in relationship to the general location of student lockers and common areas.

Most schools in North America have either a "junior high" or a "middle" schools, the Concordia district is rare in that the school district has both a junior high (grades 7–8) and a middle school (grades 5–6). Most school districts have one or the other but not both.

== Extracurricular activities ==
=== Athletics ===
Concordia Junior-Senior High School competes in the North Central Kansas League and are known as the "Panthers". Concordia Junior-Senior High School offers the following sports:

Fall

- Football
- Volleyball
- Boys' Cross-Country
- Girls' Cross-Country
- Girls' Golf
- Girls' Tennis

Winter

- Boys' Basketball
- Girls' Basketball
- Wrestling

Spring

- Baseball
- Boys' Golf
- Boys' Tennis
- Softball
- Boys' Track and Field
- Girls' Track and Field

=== Activities ===
A wide collection of activities are available to students at the school:

Clubs

- FFA
- FCCLA
- National Honor Society
- various other clubs and organizations

Arts

- Band
- Choir
- Dramatic arts

Competitive activities

- Debate
- Forensics

== Notable people ==
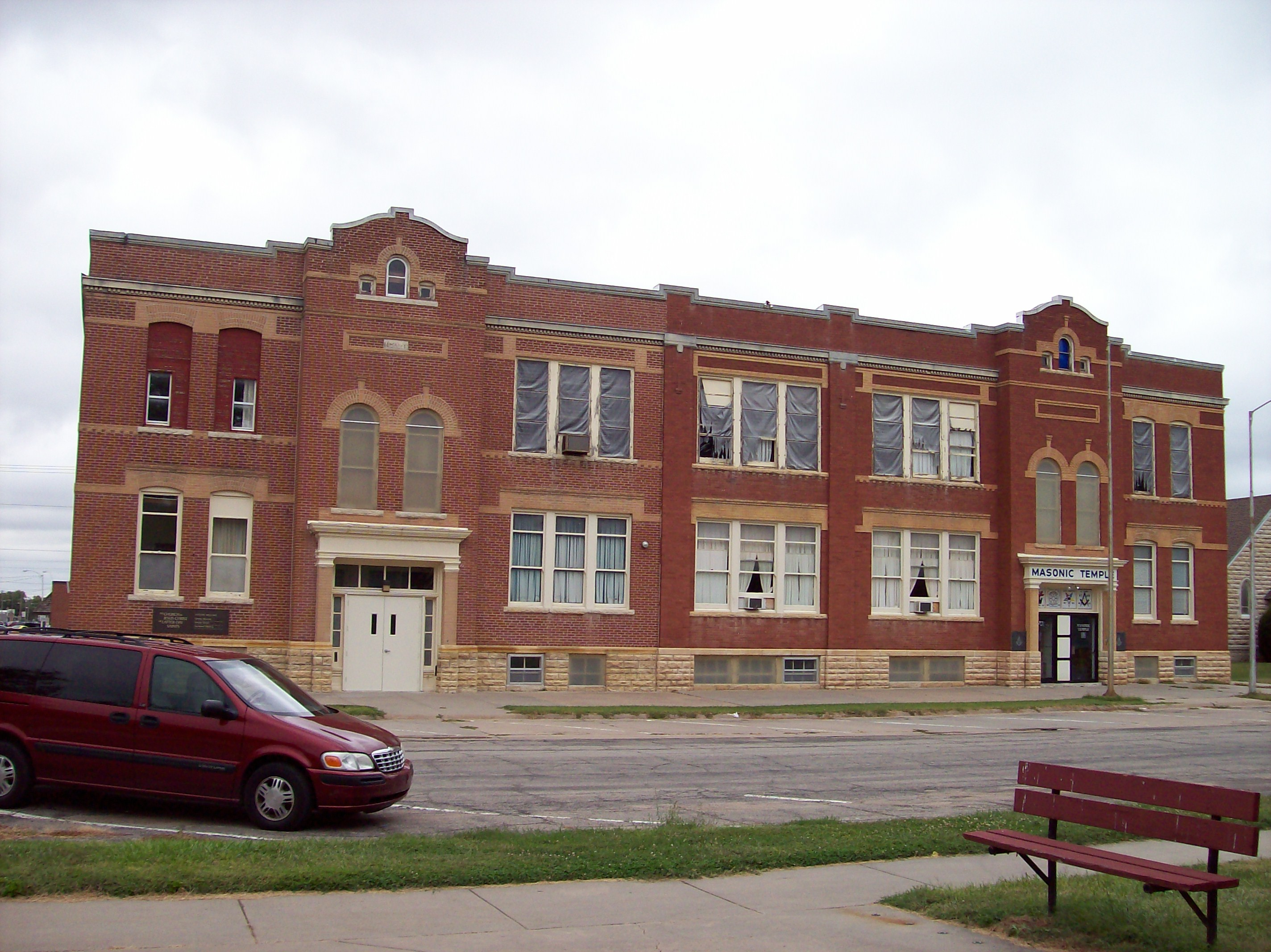
Old Concordia High School building, photo taken 2007. Building is now used for Concordia Masonic Lodge.

Concordia High School, view from northeast, circa 1921. Missing are several additions to the building including the Junior High School.

=== Alumni ===
- Amber Campbell, recipient of National Science Foundation Graduate Research Fellowship Award and DNA/Paleopathology researcher
- Keith Christensen, former NFL Football Player for the New Orleans Saints
- Jim Garver, country music guitarist
- Mike Gardner, collegiate head football coach at Tabor College and later at Malone College (7th grade only)
- Tim McCarty, collegiate football coach
- Bill Dotson, Three time American record holder in the 1 mile run, inducted into the Kansas Sports Hall of Fame.
- Robert E. Pearson, movie director
- Ernie Quigley, professional basketball referee and as an umpire in Major League Baseball
- Kaye Vaughan, former Canadian Football League and Hall of Fame player with the Ottawa Rough Riders, winner CFL's Outstanding Lineman Award

=== Faculty ===
- Tom Brosius, track & field athlete and coach
- Larry Hartshorn, former NFL football player Chicago Cardinals
- Pop Hollinger, pioneer of the industry of comic book collection and trading

== See also ==
- List of high schools in Kansas
- List of unified school districts in Kansas
