= 1968 Missouri Tigers football team =

American college football season

1968 Missouri Tigers football

Gator Bowl champion

Gator Bowl, W 35–10 vs. Alabama
- Conference: Big Eight Conference

Ranking
- Coaches: No. 17
- AP: No. 9
- Record: 8–3 (5–2 Big 8)
- Head coach: Dan Devine (11th season)
- Captain: Carl Garber
- Home stadium: Memorial Stadium

1968 Big Eight Conference football standings
	Conf.					Overall
Team	W		L		T	W		L		T
No. 7 Kansas +	6	–	1	–	0	9	–	2	–	0
No. 11 Oklahoma +	6	–	1	–	0	7	–	4	–	0
No. 9 Missouri	5	–	2	–	0	8	–	3	–	0
Nebraska	3	–	4	–	0	6	–	4	–	0
Colorado	3	–	4	–	0	4	–	6	–	0
Kansas State	2	–	5	–	0	4	–	6	–	0
Oklahoma State	2	–	5	–	0	3	–	7	–	0
Iowa State	1	–	6	–	0	3	–	7	–	0
+ – Conference co-champions; Rankings from AP Poll

The 1968 Missouri Tigers football team was an American football team that represented the University of Missouri in the Big Eight Conference (Big 8) during the 1968 NCAA University Division football season. The team compiled an 8–3 record (5–2 against Big 8 opponents), finished in third place in the Big 8, defeated Alabama in the 1968 Gator Bowl, and outscored opponents by a combined total of 308 to 136. Dan Devine was the head coach for the 11th of 13 seasons. The team played its home games at Memorial Stadium in Columbia, Missouri.

The team's statistical leaders included Greg Cook with 693 rushing yards, Terry McMillan with 745 passing yards and 1,102 yards of total offense, Jon Staggers with 171 receiving yards, and James Harrison with 48 points scored.

== Schedule ==
Date	Time	Opponent	Rank	Site	TV	Result	Attendance	Source
September 21		at Kentucky*		McLean Stadium; Lexington, KY		L 6–12	34,000	
September 28		at Illinois*		Memorial Stadium; Champaign, IL (rivalry)		W 44–0	48,127	
October 5	1:30 p.m.	Army*		Memorial Stadium; Columbia, MO		W 7–3	58,576	
October 12		Colorado		Memorial Stadium; Columbia, MO		W 27–14	50,705	
October 19	2:00 p.m.	at No. 13 Nebraska	No. 20	Memorial Stadium; Lincoln, NE (rivalry)		W 16–14	66,289	
October 26		at Kansas State	No. 14	KSU Stadium; Manhattan, KS		W 56–20	28,000	
November 2		Oklahoma State	No. 10	Memorial Stadium; Columbia, MO		W 42–7	52,200	
November 9	1:30 p.m.	Iowa State^{†}	No. 8	Memorial Stadium; Columbia, MO (rivalry)		W 42–7	52,200	
November 16		at Oklahoma	No. 6	Oklahoma Memorial Stadium; Norman, OK		L 14–28	60,500	
November 23		No. 7 Kansas	No. 13	Memorial Stadium; Columbia, MO (Border War)		L 19–21	62,200	
December 28		vs. No. 12 Alabama*	No. 16	Gator Bowl Stadium; Jacksonville, FL (Gator Bowl)	ABC	W 35–10	68,011	
*Non-conference game; ^{†}Homecoming; Rankings from AP Poll released prior to the game; All times are in Central time

== Game summaries ==
=== Gator Bowl ===
Team	1	2	3	4	Total
• Missouri	7	7	0	21	35
Alabama	0	7	0	3	10

- Date: December 28
- Location: Gator Bowl, Jacksonville, Florida
- Game attendance: 68,011
- Television network: ABC

Scoring summary
1	MU	Terry McMillan 4-yard run (Sangster kick)	MU 7-0
2	ALA	Donnie Sutton 38-yard interception return (Mike Dean kick)	Tied 7-7
2	MU	Terry McMillan 5-yard run (Sangster kick)	MU 14-7
4	ALA	Mike Dean 25-yard field goal	MU 14-10
4	MU	Terry McMillan 2-yard run (Sangster kick)	MU 21-10
4	MU	Greg Cook 37-yard run (Sangster kick)	MU 28-10
4	MU	Dennis Poppe 47-yard interception return (Sangster kick)	MU 35-10

== Roster ==
1968 Missouri Tigers football team roster
Players
Coaches
Offense

Pos.	#	Name	Class
QB	14	Mike Farmer	So
WR	21	Mel Gray	So
RB	36	James Harrison	So
OT	75	Larron Jackson	So
QB	18	Terry McMillan	Jr
RB	45	Joe Moore	So

Defense

Pos.	#	Name	Class
DB	22	Jon Staggers	Jr
DB	23	Roger Wehrli	Sr

Special teams

Pos.	#	Name	Class

Head coach

- Dan Devine

Coordinators/assistant coaches

Legend

- (C) Team captain
- (S) Suspended
- (I) Ineligible
- Injured
- Redshirt

Roster
