= 1968 Iowa State Cyclones football team =

American college football season

1968 Iowa State Cyclones football
- Conference: Big Eight Conference
- Record: 3–7 (1–6 Big 8)
- Head coach: Johnny Majors (1st season)
- Offensive coordinator: King Block (1st season)
- Defensive coordinator: Larry Lacewell (1st season)
- Captains: George Dimitri; John Warder
- Home stadium: Clyde Williams Field

1968 Big Eight Conference football standings
	Conf.					Overall
Team	W		L		T	W		L		T
No. 7 Kansas +	6	–	1	–	0	9	–	2	–	0
No. 11 Oklahoma +	6	–	1	–	0	7	–	4	–	0
No. 9 Missouri	5	–	2	–	0	8	–	3	–	0
Nebraska	3	–	4	–	0	6	–	4	–	0
Colorado	3	–	4	–	0	4	–	6	–	0
Kansas State	2	–	5	–	0	4	–	6	–	0
Oklahoma State	2	–	5	–	0	3	–	7	–	0
Iowa State	1	–	6	–	0	3	–	7	–	0
+ – Conference co-champions; Rankings from AP Poll

The 1968 Iowa State Cyclones football team represented Iowa State University in the Big Eight Conference during the 1968 NCAA University Division football season. In their first year under head coach Johnny Majors, the Cyclones compiled a 3–7 record (1–6 against conference opponents), finished in last place in the conference, and were outscored by opponents by a combined total of 273 to 178. They played their home games at Clyde Williams Field in Ames, Iowa.

George Dimitri and John Warder were the team captains.

== Schedule ==
Date	Time	Opponent	Site	Result	Attendance	Source
September 14	2:00 pm	Buffalo*	Clyde Williams Field; Ames, IA	W 28–10	23,000	
September 21	2:00 pm	Arizona*	Clyde Williams Field; Ames, IA	L 12–21	20,908	
September 28	8:30 pm	at BYU*	Cougar Stadium; Provo, UT	W 28–20	24,959	
October 5	2:00 pm	Colorado	Clyde Williams Field; Ames, IA	L 18–28	24,000	
October 12	1:30 pm	at Kansas State	KSU Stadium; Manhattan, KS (rivalry)	W 23–14	32,000	
October 19	1:30 pm	at Oklahoma	Oklahoma Memorial Stadium; Norman, OK	L 7–42	49,350	
October 26	2:00 pm	No. 3 Kansas^{†}	Clyde Williams Field; Ames, IA	L 25–46	26,000	
November 2	2:00 pm	Nebraska	Clyde Williams Field; Ames, IA (rivalry)	L 13–24	29,000	
November 9	1:30 pm	at No. 8 Missouri	Memorial Stadium; Columbia, MO (rivalry)	L 7–42	52,200	
November 16	1:30 pm	at Oklahoma State	Lewis Field; Stillwater, OK	L 17–26	17,000	
*Non-conference game; ^{†}Homecoming; Rankings from AP Poll released prior to the game; All times are in Central time

== Coaching staff ==
Name	Position	Year at Iowa State	Previous job
Johnny Majors	Head coach	1st	Arkansas
King Block	Offensive coordinator, offensive Line	1st	Washington State
Jack Blazek	Freshman coach	1st	Marshalltown HS
Jimmy Johnson	Interior linemen	1st	Wichita State
Ollie Keller	Offensive backfield	1st	Memphis Catholic HS
Larry Lacewell	Defensive coordinator, ends, linebackers	1st	Wichita State
Joe Madden	Defensive backs	1st	Wake Forest
Jackie Sherrill	Offensive backs	1st	Arkansas
Gordon Smith	Wide receivers	1st	Arkansas
Arch Steele	Scout squad	15th	

== Roster ==
1968 Iowa State Cyclones Football
Quarterback: 14 Obert Tisdale – Sophomore (6'2", 187); 15 John Warder – Senior (6'0", 183); 16 Bill Reding – Sophomore (6'3", 191); 18 Mike Glinn – Sophomore (5'9", 165); Running back: 20 Ben King – Senior (5'10", 190); 21 Jeff Allen – Sophomore (6'0", 188); 22 Willie Harris – Sophomore (6'3", 192); 23 Sammy Davis – Sophomore (5'9", 160); 25 Ray Coleman – Sophomore (6'2", 196); 27 Bob Thomas – Junior (5'8", 166); 33 Roger Guge – Sophomore (6'1", 196); 35 Ray Coffey – Junior (5'10", 175); 37 Bruce Beerman – Sophomore (5'10", 181); 44 Jock Johnson – Sophomore (6'0", 199); Wide receiver/tight end: 34 Mike Terrizzi – Sophomore (6'3", 205); 40 Bob Brouillette – Junior (6'2", 193); 42 Marshall Langhor – Junior (6'0", 186); 80 Tom Lorenz – Sophomore (6'3", 202); 85 Otto Stowe – Sophomore (6'2", 172); 87 Greg Dukstein – Junior (6'0", 168); 88 Sam Campbell – Senior (6'5", 217); Placekicker: 38 Vern Skripsky – Junior (6'3", 197)	Offensive lineman: 50 Wayne Beske – Junior (6'1", 218); 51 Dennis Pelisek – Sophomore (6'0", 189); 54 Steve Richards – Junior (6'0", 182); 60 Larry Gaffin- Senior (6'0", 186); 61 Dan McAvoy – Sophomore (6'1", 197); 63 Mike Bliss – Junior (6'0", 198); 64 Bill Easter – Sophomore (6'0", 194); 65 Ted Hall – Senior (6'0", 185); 67 Mike O'Neill – Sophomore (6'3", 202); 70 Dan Robinson – Junior (6'2", 242); 73 Joe Marconi – Sophomore (6'2", 220); 76 Jim Crow – Sophomore (6'1", 204); 77 Tim Jeffries – Sophomore (6'4", 225); 78 Jerry Berna – Sophomore (6'1", 208); 79 Tom Barnes – Sophomore (6'4", 218); Defensive lineman: 53 Tim Connor – Sophomore (6'0", 189); 62 Terry Voy – Senior (6'0", 209); 66 Fred Jones – Junior (6'0", 198); 72 John Griglione – Sophomore (6'3", 209); 74 Craig Boller – Junior (6'1", 213); 75 George Dimitti – Senior (6'0", 228); 81 Chuck Wilkinson – Sophomore (6'1", 190); 82 Mike Kirar – Junior (6'2", 196); 84 John Koningswood – Sophomore (6'2", 196); 86 John Kelly – Sophomore (6'1", 191); 89 Ted Reimer – Senior (6'4", 199); 90 Tom Potter – Sophomore (6'4", 202); 91 Andy Waller – Sophomore (6'2", 212); 92 Eric Ghianni – Sophomore (6'0", 209); 94 Larry Herrman – Sophomore (6'3", 205)	Linebacker: 26 Steve Powers – Sophomore (6'1", 193); 31 Bob Williams – Sophomore (5'11", 171); 32 Randy Calm – Junior (6'1", 183); 39 Al Staidl – Senior (6'0", 202); 45 Jerry Fiat – Junior (6'0", 178); 55 Mark Withrow – Sophomore (6'1", 190); 56 Jerry Boyington – Sophomore (6'2", 194); 57 Keith Schroeder – Sophomore (6'0", 205); 59 Mike Lorber – Sophomore (6'1", 189); 83 Roy Snell – Sophomore (6'1", 190); 93 Ray Harm – Sophomore (6'3", 194); Defensive back: 12 Brad Steckmesser – Sophomore (6'2", 189); 13 Tony Washington – Sophomore (6'1", 168); 17 Jeff Simonds – Senior (6'1", 180); 23 Sammy Davis – Sophomore (5'9", 160); 28 Tom Hilden – Sophomore (6'0", 178); 29 Tom Elliott – Sophomore (5'11", 169); 41 John Usmial – Sophomore (6'0", 172); 46 Hub Nelson – Junior (5'11", 169); 49 Steve Karber- Sophomore (6'0", 175); 68 Tom Salerno – Junior (5'11", 182)
