= Concordia USD 333 =

School district in Concordia, Kansas

Address
- 217 W. 7th St. Concordia, Kansas, 66901; United States
- Coordinates: 39.5705316°N 97.6613618°W

District information
- Type: Public
- Grades: PreK to 12
- Superintendent: Quentin Breese (2020)
- School board: 7 members
- Schools: 3

Other information
- Website: usd333.com

Concordia USD 333 is a public unified school district headquartered in Concordia, Kansas, United States. The district includes the communities of Concordia, Jamestown, Aurora, Hollis, Huscher, Rice, and nearby rural areas.

== Schools ==
The school district operates the following schools:

- Concordia Junior-Senior High School
- Concordia Middle School
- Concordia Elementary School

Closed schools

- Jamestown High School (closed)
- McKinley Elementary School (closed)
- Washington Elementary School (closed)

=== Concordia Junior-Senior High School ===
Concordia students attend the Junior-Senior High for grades 7-8 (junior high) and 9-12 (senior high).

=== Concordia Middle School ===
The Concordia district has both a "junior high" school and a "middle" school in the same district. School districts normally have either a "junior high" or a "middle" school but rarely have both. In Concordia, the middle school houses grades 5-6 where the junior high houses grades 7-8 (as well as grades 9-12 for the senior high in the attached building complex). At the end of the 2012-13 school year, Concordia Middle School closed but has since re-opened.

== See also ==
- Kansas State Department of Education
- Kansas State High School Activities Association
- List of high schools in Kansas
- List of unified school districts in Kansas

== Gallery ==
Junior high entrance of Junior-Senior High School

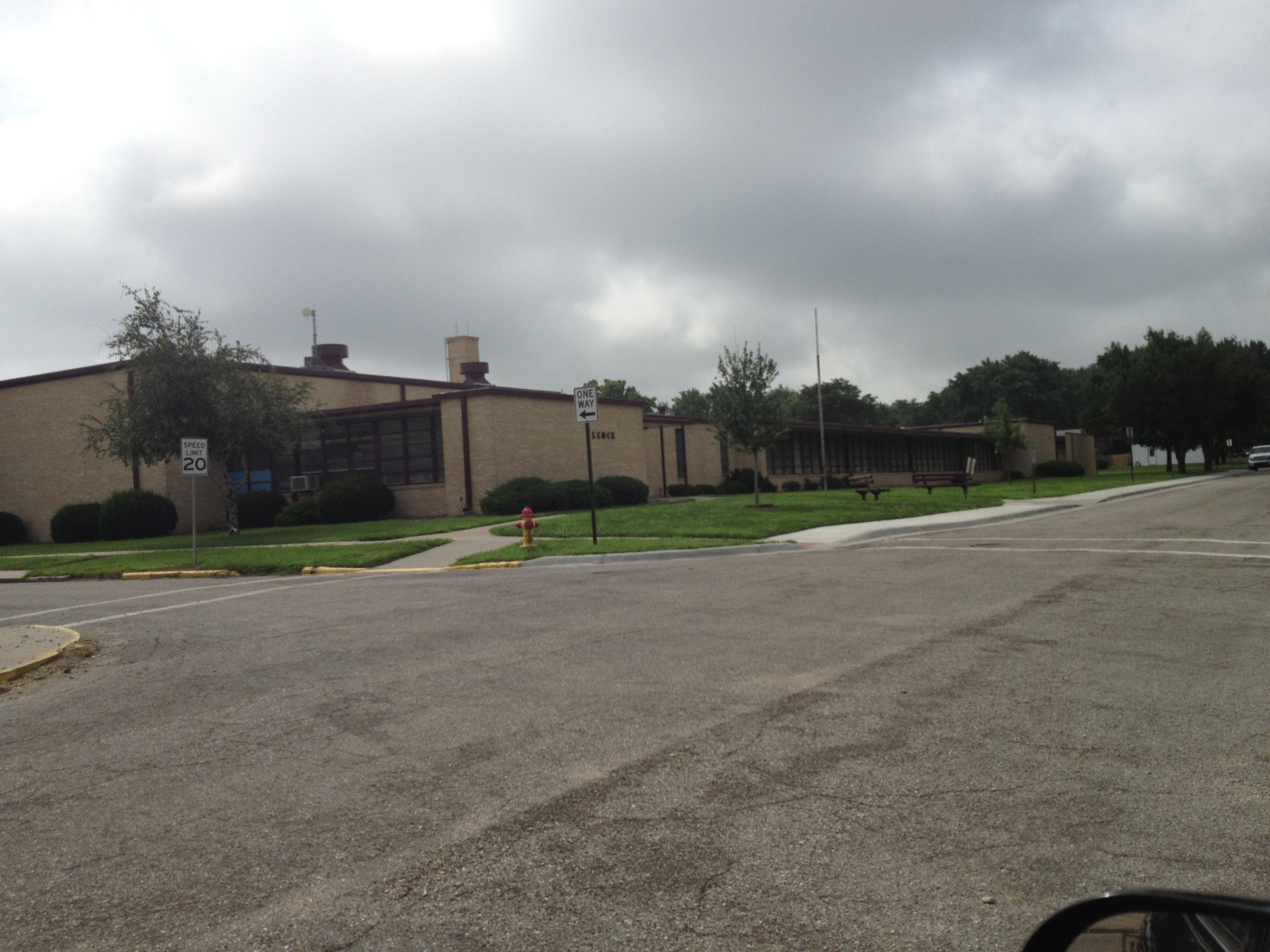
LCNCK Special Education Services (formerly Lincoln Elementary School)

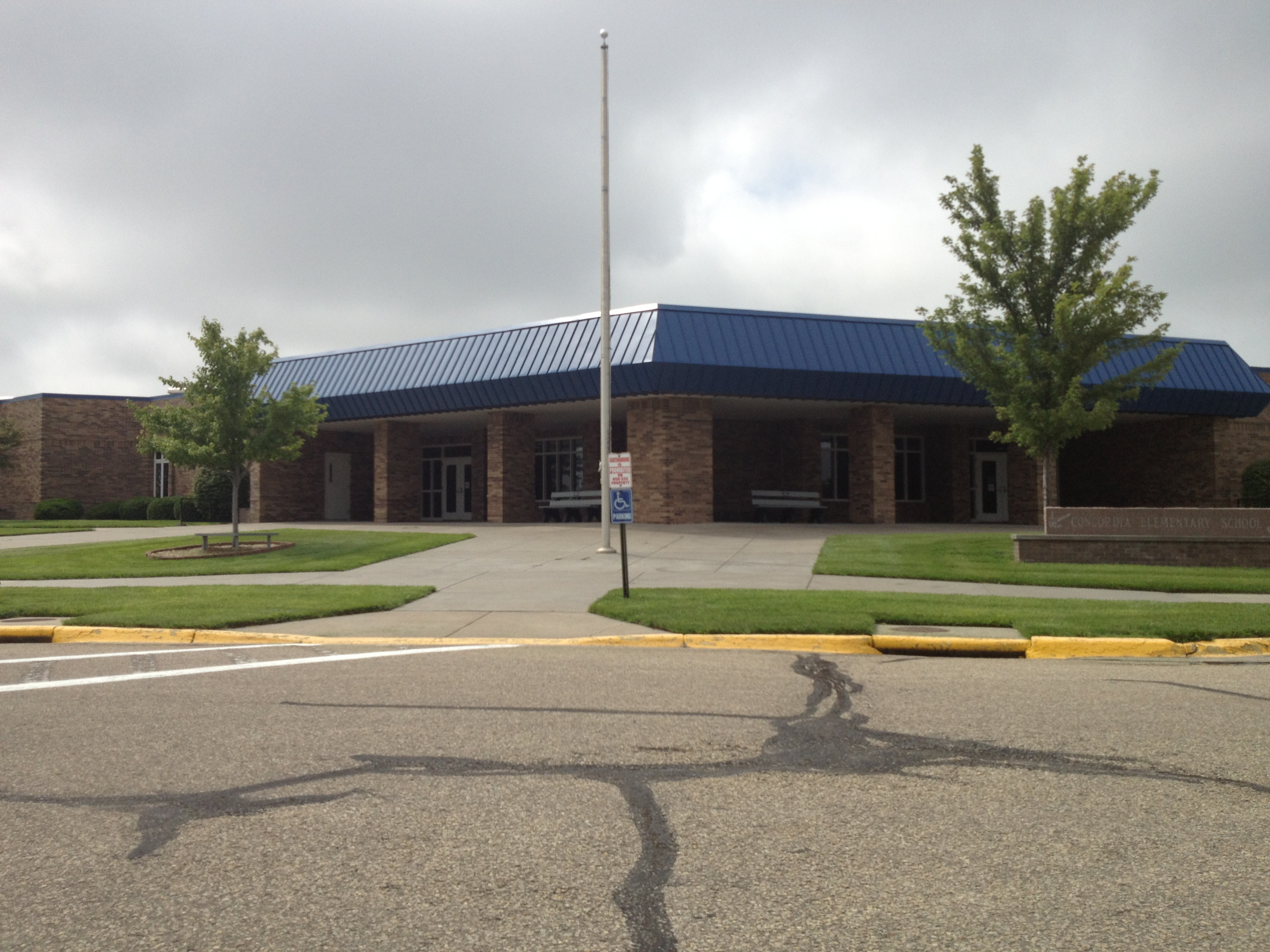
Concordia Elementary School

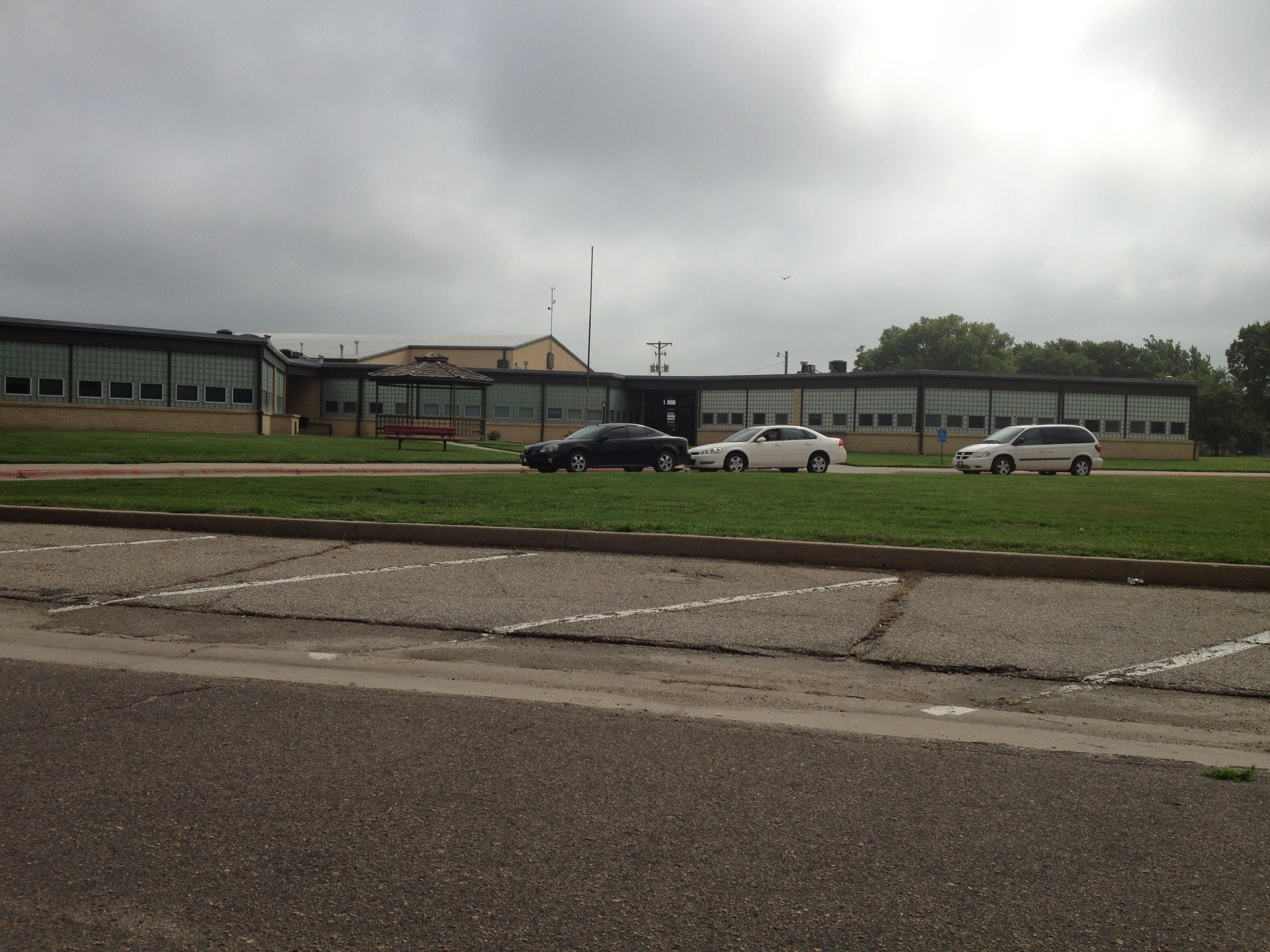
Concordia Middle School

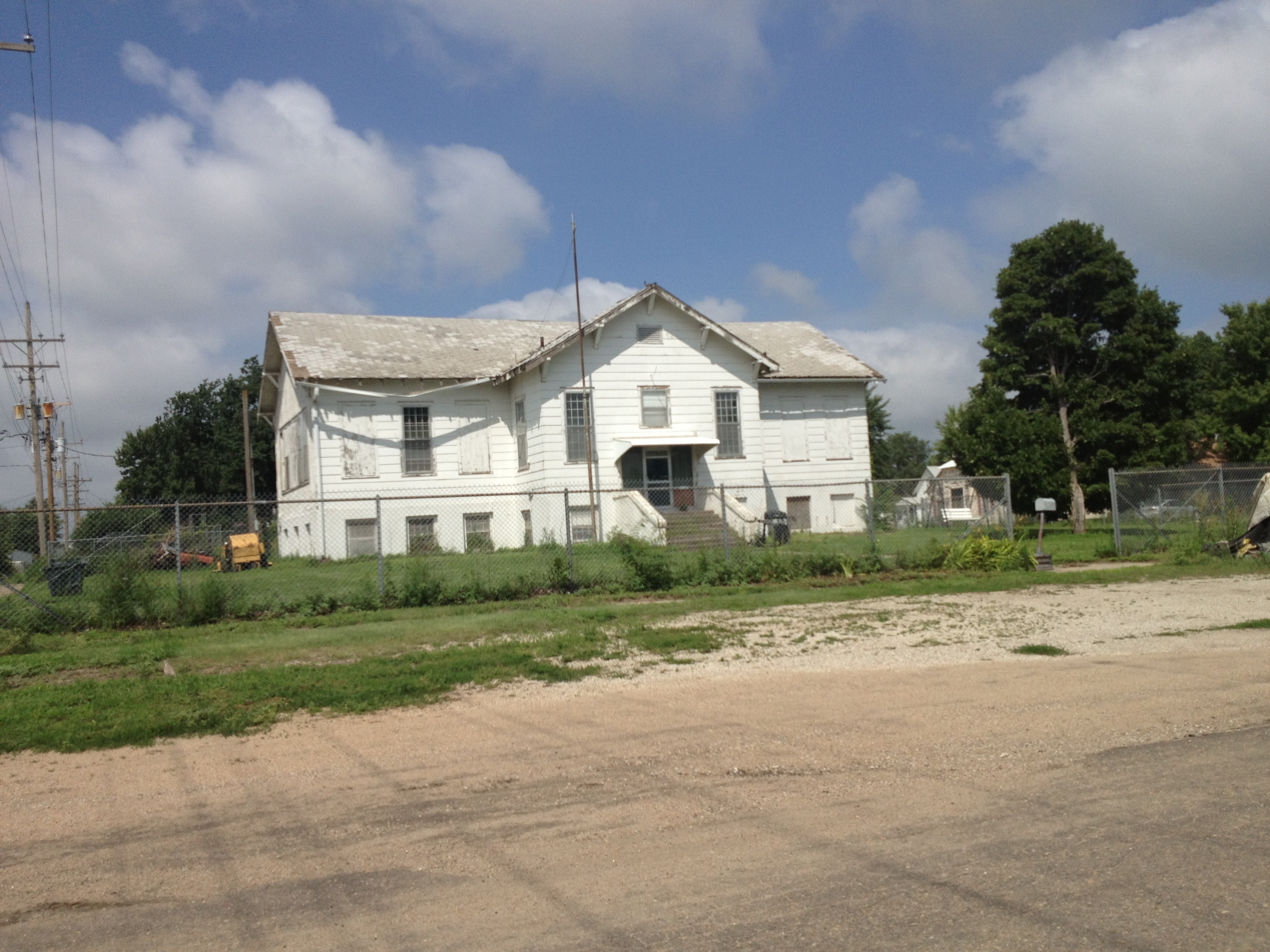
Former Garfield School building

Harold Clark Stadium

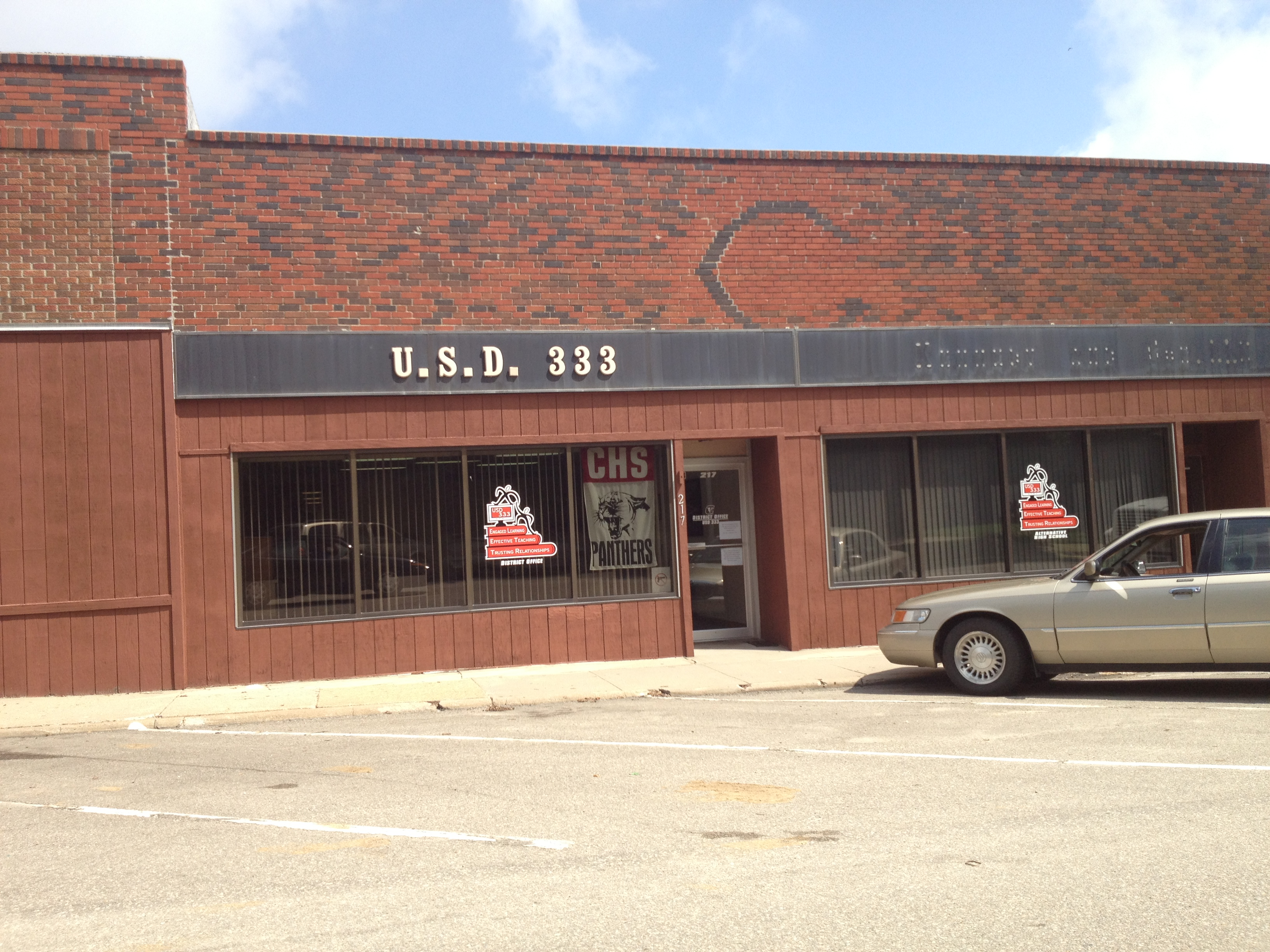
School Board Office
