= 1968 Oklahoma State Cowboys football team =

American college football season

1968 Oklahoma State Cowboys football
- Conference: Big Eight Conference
- Record: 3–7 (2–5 Big 8)
- Head coach: Phil Cutchin (6th season)
- Home stadium: Lewis Field

1968 Big Eight Conference football standings
	Conf.					Overall
Team	W		L		T	W		L		T
No. 7 Kansas +	6	–	1	–	0	9	–	2	–	0
No. 11 Oklahoma +	6	–	1	–	0	7	–	4	–	0
No. 9 Missouri	5	–	2	–	0	8	–	3	–	0
Nebraska	3	–	4	–	0	6	–	4	–	0
Colorado	3	–	4	–	0	4	–	6	–	0
Kansas State	2	–	5	–	0	4	–	6	–	0
Oklahoma State	2	–	5	–	0	3	–	7	–	0
Iowa State	1	–	6	–	0	3	–	7	–	0
+ – Conference co-champions; Rankings from AP Poll

The 1968 Oklahoma State Cowboys football team represented Oklahoma State University–Stillwater in the Big Eight Conference during the 1968 NCAA University Division football season. In their sixth and final season under head coach Phil Cutchin, the Cowboys compiled a 3–7 record (2–5 against conference opponents), tied for sixth place in the conference, and were outscored by opponents by a combined total of 288 to 161.

On offense, the 1968 team averaged 16.1 points scored, 136.3 rushing yards, and 172.8 passing yards per game. On defense, the team allowed an average of 28.8 points scored, 256.0 rushing yards, and 162.5 passing yards per game. The team's statistical leaders included Duane Porter with 307 rushing yards, Ronnie Johnson with 1,438 passing yards, Terry Brown with 688 receiving yards, and Wayne Hallmark with 18 points scored.

Offensive lineman Jon Kolb was selected by the Associated Press, United Press International, and Central Press Association as a first-team All-American. Kolb and middle guard John Little were selected as first-team All-Big Eight Conference players.

The team played its home games at Lewis Field in Stillwater, Oklahoma.

== Schedule ==
Date	Opponent	Site	Result	Attendance	Source
September 21	at Arkansas*	War Memorial Stadium; Little Rock, AR	L 15–32	53,307	
October 5	at Texas*	Memorial Stadium; Austin, TX	L 3–31	51,000	
October 12	at No. 11 Houston*	Houston Astromdome; Houston, TX	W 21–17	41,889	
October 19	at No. 4 Kansas	Memorial Stadium; Lawrence, KS	L 14–49	36,000	
October 26	Nebraska^{†}	Lewis Field; Stillwater, OK	L 20–21	35,200	
November 2	at No. 10 Missouri	Memorial Stadium; Columbia, MO	L 7–42	52,200	
November 9	Colorado	Lewis Field; Stillwater, OK	W 34–17	17,000	
November 16	Iowa State	Lewis Field; Stillwater, OK	W 26–17	17,000	
November 23	at Kansas State	KSU Stadium; Manhattan, KS	L 14–21	18,000	
November 30	No. 11 Oklahoma	Lewis Field; Stillwater, OK (Bedlam Series)	L 7–41	38,000	
*Non-conference game; ^{†}Homecoming; Rankings from AP Poll released prior to the game

== After the season ==
The 1969 NFL/AFL draft was held on January 28–29, 1969. The following Cowboys were selected.

Round	Pick	Player	Position	NFL club
3	56	Jon Kolb	Tackle	Pittsburgh Steelers
3	73	Terry Brown	Defensive back	St. Louis Cardinals
