= 1968 All-Big Eight Conference football team =

American all-star college football team

The 1968 All-Big Eight Conference football team consists of American football players chosen by various organizations for All-Big Eight Conference teams for the 1968 NCAA University Division football season. The selectors for the 1968 season included the Associated Press (AP) and United Press International (UPI).

== Offensive selections ==
=== Ends ===
- Dave Jones, Kansas State (AP-1; UPI-1)
- Steve Zabel, Oklahoma (AP-1)
- John Mosier, Kansas (AP-2; UPI-1)
- Terry Brown, Oklahoma State (AP-2)

=== Tackles ===
- Mike Montler, Colorado (AP-1; UPI-1)
- Keith Christensen, Kansas (AP-1; UPI-1)
- Byron Bigby, Oklahoma (AP-2)
- John Ward, Oklahoma State (AP-2)

=== Guards ===
- Joe Armstrong, Nebraska (AP-1; UPI-1)
- Jim Anderson, Missouri (AP-1)
- Ken Mendenhall, Oklahoma (UPI-1)
- Ken Wertzberger, Kansas (AP-2)
- Ed Lancaster, Oklahoma (AP-2)

=== Centers ===
- Jon Kolb, Oklahoma State (AP-1; UPI-1)
- Dale Evans, Kansas (AP-2)

=== Backs ===
- Bobby Douglass, Kansas (AP-1; UPI-1)
- Steve Owens, Oklahoma (AP-1; UPI-1)
- Eddie Hinton, Oklahoma (AP-1; UPI-1)
- John Riggins, Kansas (AP-1; UPI-1)
- Bob Anderson, Colorado (AP-1)
- Bob Warmack, Oklahoma (AP-2)
- Donnie Shanklin, Kansas (AP-2)
- Mack Herron, Kansas State (AP-2)
- Joe Orduna, Nebraska (AP-2)

== Defensive selections ==
=== Defensive ends ===
- John Zook, Kansas (AP-1; UPI-1)
- Bill Schmitt, Missouri (AP-1; UPI-1)
- Mike Schnitker, Colorado (AP-2)
- Elmer Benhardt, Missouri (AP-2)

=== Defensive tackles ===
- Jay "Rocky" Wallace, Missouri (AP-1; UPI-1)
- George Dimitri, Iowa State (AP-1; UPI-1)
- John Tisworth, Oklahoma (AP-2)
- Mark Kuhlman, Missouri (AP-2)

=== Middle guards ===
- John Little, Oklahoma State (AP-1; UPI-1)
- John Stucky, Kansas State (AP-2)

=== Linebackers ===
- Emery Hicks, Kansas (AP-1; UPI-1)
- Ken Geddes, Nebraska (AP-1; UPI-1)
- Rocky Martin, Colorado (AP-1)
- Carl Garber, Missouri (AP-2; UPI-1)
- Larry Gosney, Oklahoma State (AP-2)
- Don Pfrimmer, Oklahoma (AP-2)

=== Defensive backs ===
- Roger Wehrli, Missouri (AP-1; UPI-1)
- Steve Barrett, Oklahoma (AP-1; UPI-1)
- Dana Stephenson, Nebraska (AP-1; UPI-1)
- Butch Davis, Missouri (AP-2)
- Gary Goodwin, Oklahoma State (AP-2)
- Bob Best, Nebraska (AP-2)

== Key ==
AP = Associated Press

UPI = United Press International

== See also ==
- 1968 College Football All-America Team
