= Bobby Douglass =

American football player (born 1947)

No. 10, 14, 19
- Position: Quarterback

Personal information
- Born: June 22, 1947 (age 79); Manhattan, Kansas, U.S.
- Listed height: 6 ft 4 in (1.93 m)
- Listed weight: 225 lb (102 kg)

Career information
- High school: El Dorado (El Dorado, Kansas)
- College: Kansas
- NFL draft: 1969: 2nd round, 41st overall pick

Career history
- Chicago Bears (1969–1975); San Diego Chargers (1975); New Orleans Saints (1976–1977); Green Bay Packers (1978)

Awards and highlights
- First-team All-American (1968); 2× First-team All-Big Eight (1967, 1968); NFL Records Most rushing touchdowns by a quarterback in a game = 4 (tied with Billy Kilmer)

Career NFL statistics
- Passing attempts: 1,178
- Passing completions: 507
- Completion percentage: 43.0%
- TD–INT: 36–64
- Passing yards: 6,493
- Passer rating: 48.5
- Rushing yards: 2,654
- Rushing touchdowns: 22
- Stats at Pro Football Reference

Robert Gilchrist Douglass (born June 22, 1947) is an American former professional football player who was a quarterback in the National Football League (NFL), primarily with the Chicago Bears. He played college football for the Kansas Jayhawks before being selected by the Bears in the second round of the 1969 NFL/AFL draft. During his career, he also played for the San Diego Chargers, the New Orleans Saints, and the Green Bay Packers. Douglass retired after the 1978 season, after playing 10 seasons in the NFL.

== Early life ==
Douglass was raised in El Dorado, Kansas, where his father was a football coach.

== College career ==
Playing at the University of Kansas, Douglass was a two-time All-Big Eight Conference (1967–68) selection and an All-American in 1968. During his senior season, he directed the Jayhawks to a 9–2 record, a share of the Big Eight Conference title and a spot in the 1969 Orange Bowl. He passed for 1,316 yards and 12 touchdowns during his final year as a Jayhawk and finished seventh in the Heisman Trophy voting that season.

Career statistics

Year	Team	Passing								Rushing			
Year	Team	Cmp	Att	Pct	Yds	Y/A	TD	Int	Rtg	Att	Yds	Avg	TD
1966	Kansas	17	38	44.7	175	4.6	1	3	76.3	72	105	1.5	0
1967	Kansas	82	173	47.4	1,326	7.7	7	11	112.4	175	415	2.4	7
1968	Kansas	84	168	50.0	1,316	7.8	12	6	132.2	148	495	3.3	12
Career		183	379	48.3	2,817	7.4	20	20	117.6	395	1,015	2.6	19

== Professional career ==
In 1972, playing for the Chicago Bears, Douglass set the record for most rushing yards by a quarterback in one season. The record stood for 34 years. In a 14-game 1972 season, he ran for 968 yards and 8 touchdowns on 141 carries. Three quarterbacks in the NFL (Lamar Jackson twice, Michael Vick, and Justin Fields) have since run for over 1,000 yards. With Douglass starting, the Chicago Bears had a 13–31–1 record.

In a November 4, 1973 game against the Packers, Douglass ran for four touchdowns in a 31–17 win. He and Billy Kilmer are the only quarterbacks in NFL history to rush for four touchdowns in a single game.

In five seasons from 1971 to 1975, Douglass played in 47 games and amassed 2,040 rushing yards. During that span, he averaged 43.4 rushing yards per game played—the third highest rushing yards per game average over a five-season span for a quarterback. (Michael Vick ranks first with 54.1 yards per game over a five-year span from 2002 to 2006). However, Douglass had little success as a passer, going 507-for-1178 for 36 touchdowns and 64 interceptions with a quarterback passer rating of only 48.5 during his 10-season NFL career.

== NFL career statistics ==
Legend
**Bold**	Career high

Year	Team	Games			Passing								Rushing			
Year	Team	GP	GS	Record	Cmp	Att	Pct	Yds	Avg	TD	Int	Rtg	Att	Yds	Avg	TD
1969	CHI	11	7	1−6	68	148	45.9	773	5.2	5	8	50.9	51	408	8.0	2
1970	CHI	3	1	1−0	12	30	40.0	218	7.3	4	3	**65.7**	7	22	3.1	0
1971	CHI	12	7	3−4	91	**225**	40.4	1,164	5.2	5	**15**	37.0	39	284	7.3	3
1972	CHI	14	14	4−9−1	75	198	37.9	1,246	6.3	**9**	12	49.8	**141**	**968**	6.9	**8**
1973	CHI	13	12	3−9	81	174	46.6	1,057	6.1	5	7	59.0	94	525	5.6	5
1974	CHI	7	3	1−2	41	100	41.0	387	3.9	2	4	42.4	36	229	6.4	1
1975	CHI	1	1	0−1	8	20	40.0	87	4.4	0	2	14.0	5	34	6.8	1
1975	SD	3	0	—	7	27	25.9	53	2.0	0	1	24.2	10	42	4.2	0
1976	NO	11	6	2−4	**103**	213	48.4	**1,288**	6.0	4	8	58.2	21	92	4.4	2
1977	NO	4	2	1−1	16	31	**51.6**	130	4.2	1	3	33.7	2	23	**11.5**	0
1978	GB	12	0	—	5	12	41.7	90	**7.5**	1	1	61.1	4	27	6.8	0
Career		91	53	16−36−1	507	1,178	43.0	6,493	5.5	36	64	48.5	410	2,654	6.5	22

== Baseball career ==
After his professional football career was over, Douglass briefly played minor league baseball in the Chicago White Sox organization. In 1980, he pitched four games for the Iowa Oaks where he had 7 innings pitched, issued 13 walks and failed to record a strikeout.

== Personal life ==
Douglass was married to former Playboy model Carol O'Neal. They had three children together and he adopted her two sons from a previous marriage.

Douglass was arrested on charges of trespassing on April 13, 2011.
