= Ken Mendenhall =

American football player (born 1948)

- Mendenhall in 1977

No. 57
- Position: Center

Personal information
- Born: August 11, 1948 (age 78); Enid, Oklahoma, U.S.
- Listed height: 6 ft 3 in (1.91 m)
- Listed weight: 242 lb (110 kg)

Career information
- High school: Enid
- College: Oklahoma
- NFL draft: 1970: 5th round, 116th overall pick

Career history
- Atlanta Falcons (1970)*; Houston Oilers (1970)*; Baltimore Colts (1971–1980)
- * Offseason or practice squad member only

Awards and highlights
- 2× Second-team All-American (1968, 1969); 2× First-team All-Big Eight (1968, 1969); Second-team All-Big Eight (1967)
- Stats at Pro Football Reference

Kenneth Ernest Mendenhall (born August 11, 1948) is an American former professional football player who was a center for 10 seasons with the Baltimore Colts of the National Football League (NFL). He played college football for the Oklahoma Sooners.

== Biography ==
Ken Mendenhall was born in Enid, Oklahoma and grew up in Pawhuska, Osage County. He later attended Enid High School and went on to play for the University of Oklahoma, where he was "described as a devastating one-on-one blocker."

As a 1969 All-American center, he was valued by his college teammates. "He's always got the path cleared for you," said tailback Steve Owens. "He's fantastic coming off the ball on a man right in front of him. I'm glad we have him up there." In fact, "he cleared the way for Owens, who is OU's all-time leading scorer" and 1969 Heisman Trophy winner.

Drafted in the fifth-round of the 1970 NFL draft by the Atlanta Falcons, Mendenhall was traded several times (including the Houston Oilers) before landing with the Baltimore Colts where he played out his ten-season career. After the Colts' 1980 season, he retired from professional football with the distinction of having "started 118 consecutive games for the Colts, beginning in the fourth game of 1973 and continuing through the last game of 1980."
