= Jack Osberg =

American football coach (born c. 1940)

Current position
- Title: Defensive line coach
- Team: Augsburg
- Conference: MIAC

Biographical details
- Born: c. 1940 (age 85–86); Minneapolis, Minnesota, U.S.
- Education: Augsburg College (1962)

Playing career
- 1958–1961: Augsburg
- Positions: Nose guard, offensive guard

Coaching career (HC unless noted)
- 1962–1967: Roosevelt HS (MN) (assistant)
- 1968: Nebraska (GA)
- 1969–1970: Roosevelt HS (MN) (assistant)
- 1971–1976: Wayzata HS (MN)
- 1977–1984: Augsburg (DC)
- 1991–2004: Augsburg
- 2007: Augsburg (DL)
- 2011–2019: Osseo HS (MN) (DL)
- 2020–present: Augsburg (DL)

Head coaching record
- Overall: 62–79 (college)
- Tournaments: 1–1 (NCAA D-III playoffs)

Accomplishments and honors

Championships
- 1 MIAC (1997)

Awards
- 2× MIAC Coach of the Year (1996-1997)

Jack Osberg (born c. 1940) is an American college football coach. He is the defensive line coach for Augsburg University, a position he has held since 2020. He was the head football coach for Augsburg College—now known as Augsburg University—from 1991 to 2004 and is the team's all-time leader in wins. He was also the head football coach for Wayzata High School from 1971 to 1976.

== Playing career ==
Osberg grew up in Minneapolis. He played college football for Augsburg as a nose guard and offensive guard under head coach Edor Nelson. He served as a team captain in 1960.

== Coaching career ==
Osberg began his coaching career with Roosevelt High School from 1962 to 1967. In 1968, he served as a graduate assistant under head coach Bob Devaney. In 1969, he returned to Roosevelt. In 1971, Osberg earned his first head coaching gig for Wayzata High School. In 1977, he left Wayzata to become the defensive coordinator for his alma mater, Augsburg, under head coach Al Kloppen. He took a break from coaching between 1985 and 1990. In 1991, he returned to Augsburg as the head football coach as the successor to Bill Hunstock. In sixteen years as head coach he led the team to an overall record of 62–79. He coached the team to its only Minnesota Intercollegiate Athletic Conference (MIAC) title and a trip to the NCAA Division III playoffs. In 1997, the team went 10–2 and won the MIAC title outright. He resigned following the 2004 season. In 2007, he returned to Augsburg for a third time as the defensive line coach under head coach Frank Haege. After not coaching from 2008 to 2010 he returned to coaching for Osseo High School as the defensive line coach. In 2020, Osberg returned for his fourth stint with Augsburg under first-year head coach Derrin Lamker as defensive line coach.

== Personal life ==
While Osberg was serving as a coach for Wayzata High School he also taught biology. Even after he resigned from coaching he stayed as a teacher for the school.

Osberg and his wife, Nina, have been married since 1976 and they have six children. Sometime before 2021, his wife was diagnosed with Alzheimer's disease.

== Head coaching record ==
=== College ===
Year	Team	Overall	Conference	Standing	Bowl/playoffs
Augsburg Auggies (Minnesota Intercollegiate Athletic Conference) (1991–2004)
1991	Augsburg	2–7	1–7	9th	
1992	Augsburg	3–7	2–7	9th	
1993	Augsburg	5–5	4–5	6th	
1994	Augsburg	5–5	4–5	T–6th	
1995	Augsburg	6–4	5–4	T–5th	
1996	Augsburg	3–7	2–7	T–7th	
1997	Augsburg	10–2	8–1	1st	L NCAA Division III Second Round
1998	Augsburg	6–4	5–4	5th	
1999	Augsburg	6–4	5–4	6th	
2000	Augsburg	3–7	3–6	7th	
2001	Augsburg	4–6	4–5	T–6th	
2002	Augsburg	2–8	1–7	8th	
2003	Augsburg	5–5	4–4	T–4th	
2004	Augsburg	2–8	2–6	T–6th	
Augsburg:		62–79	50–72		
Total:		62–79			
National championship Conference title Conference division title or championship game berth
