= Mack Herron =

American gridiron football player (1948–2015)

No. 26, 42
- Position: Running back

Personal information
- Born: July 24, 1948; Biloxi, Mississippi, U.S.
- Died: December 6, 2015 (aged 67); Chicago, Illinois, U.S.
- Listed height: 5 ft 5 in (1.65 m)
- Listed weight: 170 lb (77 kg)

Career information
- College: Kansas State
- NFL draft: 1970: 6th round, 143rd overall pick

Career history
- 1970–1972: Winnipeg Blue Bombers (CFL)
- 1973–1975: New England Patriots
- 1975: Atlanta Falcons

Awards and highlights
- NFL kickoff return yards leader (1973); Jeff Nicklin Memorial Trophy (1972); Eddie James Memorial Trophy (1972); New England Patriots All-1970s Team; CFL All-Star (1972); 2× CFL West All-Star (1971, 1972); First-team All-Big Eight (1969); Second-team All-Big Eight (1968)
- Stats at Pro Football Reference

Mack Willie Herron (July 24, 1948 – December 6, 2015) was an American professional football player who was a running back in the Canadian Football League (CFL) and National Football League (NFL) from 1970 to 1975. He played college football for the Kansas State Wildcats, finishing second in the nation in scoring during his senior season in 1969.

== Professional career ==
Standing 5 feet 5 1/2 inches (1.66 metres) and weighing in at 170 pounds (77.1 kg), Herron was selected by the Atlanta Falcons in the sixth round (143rd overall) of the 1970 NFL draft, but joined the Canadian Football League out of college.

In 1972, while playing for the Winnipeg Blue Bombers, he won the Eddie James Memorial Trophy for being the leading rusher in the CFL's West Division. He led the league in all-purpose yards in both of his CFL seasons. The Blue Bombers released him as a result of a drug arrest in May 1972.

Herron moved to the NFL in 1973, when he joined the New England Patriots. He later played for the Atlanta Falcons. In three seasons, he gained 1,298 rushing yards and scored 9 rushing touchdowns. He also caught 61 passes in his career for 789 yards and 6 touchdowns.

After leading the NFL in kickoff returns and kickoff return yardage in 1973, Herron's best season was 1974 with the Patriots, when he set the then-NFL record for all-purpose yards with 2,444. The Patriots released him midway through the following season, with coach Chuck Fairbanks claiming the release was the result of disappointment with Herron's performance that season and with a late night party Herron threw for teammate Leon Gray. He was then signed by the Falcons. He remains 16th all time in career punt return average and 86th in kickoff return average. In 2009, he was named by the Patriots Hall of Fame nomination committee to the Patriots All-Decade Team for the 1970s as a kick returner.

== Personal life ==
While Herron's family described him as a devout Muslim who did not drink or smoke, Mack had a long history of heroin addiction, was arrested over 20 times, and served jail time according to Chicago Police. He died on December 6, 2015, at the age of 67.
