= Ken Geddes =

American football player (born 1947)

No. 36
- Position: Linebacker

Personal information
- Born: September 27, 1947 (age 79); Jacksonville, Florida, U.S.
- Listed height: 6 ft 3 in (1.91 m)
- Listed weight: 235 lb (107 kg)

Career information
- High school: Boys Town
- College: Nebraska
- NFL draft: 1970: 7th round, 175th overall pick

Career history
- Detroit Lions (1970); Los Angeles Rams (1971–1975); Seattle Seahawks (1976–1978)

Awards and highlights
- 2× First-team All-Big Eight (1968, 1969)
- Stats at Pro Football Reference

Kenneth Geddes (/ˈɡɛdiːz/ GED-eez; born September 27, 1947) is an American former professional football player who was a linebacker for eight seasons in the National Football League (NFL) from 1971 to 1978, primarily with the Los Angeles Rams. He played college football for the Nebraska Cornhuskers.

Geddes came to Boys Town from Jacksonville, Florida after the death of his mother. Leaving behind all he knew, including 17 siblings, he found his place at Boys Town. Geddes excelled as an athlete. He earned All-American and All-State honors.

Geddes played college football at the University of Nebraska–Lincoln and was selected by the Detroit Lions in the seventh round of the 1970 NFL draft.
