= Mike Schnitker =

American football player (born 1946)

No. 64
- Position: Offensive lineman

Personal information
- Born: December 30, 1946 (age 79); Atchison County, Missouri, U.S.
- Listed height: 6 ft 3 in (1.91 m)
- Listed weight: 245 lb (111 kg)

Career information
- High school: Lakewood (Lakewood, Colorado)
- College: Colorado
- NFL draft: 1969: 4th round, 84th overall pick

Career history
- Denver Broncos (1969–1975)

Awards and highlights
- First-team All-Big Eight (1967); Second-team All-Big Eight (1968); Bluebonnet Bowl (1967)

Career NFL/AFL statistics
- Games played: 74
- Games started: 26
- Fumble recoveries: 1
- Stats at Pro Football Reference

James Michael Schnitker is an American former professional football player who was an offensive lineman for the Denver Broncos of the National Football League (NFL). He played college football for the Colorado Buffaloes.

== Early career ==
Schnitker played football for Lakewood High School and was also active as a wrestler. He won in 1964 a Class AAA championship. He signed a letter of intent in April 1965 for the University of Colorado Boulder. He played as a defensive end for Colorado. In 1967 his team won the 1967 Bluebonnet Bowl, but Schnitker didn't play because of a knee-injury and went into surgery. He was selected UPI All-Big Eight Second Team Defense and a AP All-Big Eight First Team Defensive. He also got an honorable mention for the All-America Teams.

He started the 1968 season playing with an "Iron Boot" after his injury the prior season and switched to linebacker. He was selected as Big Eight Lineman of the week in October 1968 after a game against Iowa State, and after the season as AP All-Big Eight Second Team Defensive. In December 1968 he was selected for the California all-opponents team, together with teammate Mike Montler, to play in the Hula Bowl as part of the South team. He also played for the West team in the All-America football game together with Mike Montler.

== Professional career ==
In the 1969 NFL/AFL draft he was chosen as 84th overall in the fourth round by the Denver Broncos where he played as a guard. In November 1969 he was injured with a hamstring-injury. In April 1970 he re-signed with the Broncos together with John Johnson, Al Giffin, Alan Pastrana and Wandy Williams. He again suffered a knee-injury in October 1970. Also in November 1971 was he carried of the field with a knee-injury. In July 1972 he re-signed with the Denver Broncos together with Mike Current. In the summer of 1975 he underwent surgery for his knee but didn't return to pro football afterwards. He played 74 games, of which he started 26 for the Denver Broncos.
