= Steve Zabel =

American football player (1948–2026)

No. 89, 54, 58
- Positions: Linebacker, tight end

Personal information
- Born: March 20, 1948; Minneapolis, Minnesota, U.S.
- Died: June 23, 2026 (aged 78)
- Listed height: 6 ft 4 in (1.93 m)
- Listed weight: 235 lb (107 kg)

Career information
- High school: Thornton (Thornton, Colorado)
- College: Oklahoma
- NFL draft: 1970: 1st round, 6th overall pick

Career history
- Philadelphia Eagles (1970–1974); New England Patriots (1975–1978); Baltimore Colts (1979)

Awards and highlights
- New England Patriots All-1970s Team; Second-team All-American (1968); 2× First-team All-Big Eight (1968, 1969)

Career NFL statistics
- Interceptions: 6
- Stats at Pro Football Reference

Steven Gregory Zabel (March 20, 1948 – June 23, 2026) was an American professional football player who was a linebacker and tight end in the National Football League (NFL). After playing college football for the Oklahoma Sooners, he was selected by the Philadelphia Eagles in the first round of the 1970 NFL draft with the sixth overall pick.

In his ten-year career, he played in 124 games while starting in 95 of them, having six interceptions and 13 fumble recoveries. He played 60 games for the Eagles, 49 for the New England Patriots, and 15 for the Colts.

After retirement from professional football, he lived in Oklahoma and worked with charitable organizations.

Zabel died on June 23, 2026, at the age of 78.
