= Pepper Rodgers =

American gridiron football player and coach (1931–2020)

Biographical details
- Born: October 8, 1931; Atlanta, Georgia, U.S.
- Died: May 14, 2020 (aged 88); Reston, Virginia, U.S.

Playing career
- 1951–1953: Georgia Tech
- Positions: Quarterback, kicker

Coaching career (HC unless noted)
- 1958–1959: Air Force (backfield)
- 1960–1964: Florida (OC)
- 1965–1966: UCLA (backfield)
- 1967–1970: Kansas
- 1971–1973: UCLA
- 1974–1979: Georgia Tech
- 1984–1985: Memphis Showboats
- 1995: Memphis Mad Dogs

Administrative career (AD unless noted)
- 2001–2004: Washington Redskins (VP of football operations)

Head coaching record
- Overall: 73–65–3 (college); 19–19 (USFL); 9–9 (CFL)
- Bowls: 0–2

Accomplishments and honors

Championships
- 1 Big Eight (1968)

Awards
- Big Eight Coach of the Year (1968)

Franklin Cullen "Pepper" Rodgers (October 8, 1931 – May 14, 2020) was an American football player and coach. As a college football player, he led the Georgia Tech Yellow Jackets to an undefeated season in 1952 and two decades later became their head coach. He also coached the collegiate Kansas Jayhawks and UCLA Bruins before leading professional teams in Memphis, Tennessee for the United States Football League (USFL) and the Canadian Football League (CFL).

Rodgers was a quarterback and placekicker for Georgia Tech. After the Yellow Jackets won the Sugar Bowl and earned a share of the national championship in 1952, they again won the bowl game the following year, when he was named the contest's most valuable player (MVP). Rodgers began coaching as an assistant for the Air Force Falcons and later the Florida Gators and UCLA. He became a head coach with Kansas in 1967, and later returned to UCLA and then Georgia Tech as their leader. He compiled a career college coaching record of 73–65–3.

Moving to the professional ranks, Rodgers coached two seasons in the 1980s with the Memphis Showboats of the USFL and one season in 1995 for the CFL Memphis Mad Dogs. In the 2000s, he served as vice president of football operations for the Washington Redskins in the National Football League (NFL) before retiring.

== Playing career ==
Rodgers was born in Atlanta, where he became a three-sport star in football, basketball and baseball at Brown High School. His football team won a state championship in 1949.

Rodgers played college football at Georgia Tech under head coach Bobby Dodd, where he was a backup quarterback and placekicker as a sophomore in 1951. As a junior in 1952, he led the Yellow Jackets to an undefeated 12–0 season and share of the national championship after throwing for a touchdown and kicking a field goal in a 24–7 win in the 1953 Sugar Bowl over Mississippi. In the following Sugar Bowl, Rodgers threw for three touchdowns against West Virginia and was named the game's MVP. In 2018, he was named to the inaugural class of the Sugar Bowl Hall of Fame.

== Coaching career ==
Rodgers was selected in the 25th round of the 1954 NFL draft by the Baltimore Colts, but remained at Georgia Tech for a year, earning a BS degree in industrial management while also serving as a student assistant on Dodd's staff. In 1955 he joined the U.S. Air Force, where he was a pilot for five years.

While with the Air Force, Rodgers was an assistant coach for their Falcons football team. He was later an assistant for Florida and UCLA before landing his first head coaching position with Kansas in 1967. In his second year with the Jayhawks in 1968, he led the team to a share of the Big Eight Conference title.As of 2021, this is the program's most recent conference championship. They played in the Orange Bowl in Miami, but lost 15–14 to Penn State.

Rodgers returned to UCLA as its head coach in 1971. Competing in the Pac-8 Conference, he installed the wishbone offense and with junior college transfer quarterback Mark Harmon in 1972, the Bruins upset top-ranked and two-time defending champion Nebraska in the season opener, snapping the Huskers' 32-game unbeaten streak. UCLA finished 8–3 and ranked No. 15 in the final AP rankings. In 1973 they were 9–2 and ended ranked No. 12. After the season, he returned to Georgia Tech as its head coach, compiling a 34–31–2 record in his six seasons.

Rodgers was also the head coach of the USFL's Memphis Showboats from 1984 to 1985 and for the CFL's Memphis Mad Dogs in 1995. With the Showboats, he coached future Pro Football Hall of Fame player Reggie White. While coaching for the Mad Dogs, Rodgers was noted about his dislike of the rules of Canadian football.

== Executive career ==
At 69, Rodgers was considered for the Washington Redskins' head coaching position before Norv Turner's eventual firing during the 2000 season. He was instead appointed the team's vice president of football operations, a position in which he served from 2001 to 2004.

== Writing career ==
Rodgers wrote Fourth and Long Gone, a novel published in 1985 that is a bawdy roman à clef of his experiences as a college football coach and recruiter. He also wrote Pepper!: The autobiography of an unconventional coach with Al Thomy.

== Later years ==
Rodgers later lived in Reston, Virginia, where he died on May 14, 2020, at the age of 88. He was married to actress Janet Lake.

== Head coaching record ==
=== College ===
| Year | Team | Overall | Conference | Standing | Bowl/playoffs | Coaches^{#} | AP^{°} |
|---|---|---|---|---|---|---|---|
Kansas Jayhawks (Big Eight Conference) (1967–1970)
| 1967 | Kansas | 5–5 | 5–2 | T–2nd | | | |
| 1968 | Kansas | 9–2 | 6–1 | T–1st | L Orange | 6 | 7 |
| 1969 | Kansas | 1–9 | 0–7 | 8th | | | |
| 1970 | Kansas | 5–6 | 2–5 | T–6th | | | |
| Kansas: | | 20–22 | 13–15 | | | | |
UCLA Bruins (Pacific-8 Conference) (1971–1973)
| 1971 | UCLA | 2–7–1 | 1–4–1 | 8th | | | |
| 1972 | UCLA | 8–3 | 5–2 | 2nd | | T–17 | 15 |
| 1973 | UCLA | 9–2 | 6–1 | 2nd | | 9 | 12 |
| UCLA: | | 19–12–1 | 12–7–1 | | | | |
Georgia Tech Yellow Jackets (NCAA Division I / I-A independent) (1974–1979)
| 1974 | Georgia Tech | 6–5 | | | | | |
| 1975 | Georgia Tech | 7–4 | | | | | |
| 1976 | Georgia Tech | 4–6–1 | | | | | |
| 1977 | Georgia Tech | 6–5 | | | | | |
| 1978 | Georgia Tech | 7–5 | | | L Peach | | |
| 1979 | Georgia Tech | 4–6–1 | | | | | |
| Georgia Tech: | | 34–31–2 | | | | | |
| Total: | | 73–65–3 | | | | | |
^{#}Rankings from final Coaches Poll.; ^{°}Rankings from final AP Poll.

=== Professional ===
==== USFL ====
| Team | Year | Regular season | | | | | Postseason | | | |
| Team | Year | Won | Lost | Ties | Win % | Finish | Won | Lost | Win % | Result |
|---|---|---|---|---|---|---|---|---|---|---|
| MEM | 1984 | 7 | 11 | 0 | .389 | 4th in Southern Div. | did not qualify | | | |
| MEM | 1985 | 11 | 7 | 0 | .611 | 3rd in Eastern Conf. | 1 | 1 | .500 | Lost in Semifinals |
| Total | | 18 | 18 | 0 | .500 | | 1 | 1 | .500 | |

==== CFL ====
| Team | Year | Regular season | | | | | Postseason | | | |
| Team | Year | Won | Lost | Ties | Win % | Finish | Won | Lost | Win % | Result |
|---|---|---|---|---|---|---|---|---|---|---|
| MEM | 1995 | 9 | 9 | 0 | .500 | 4th in South Division | did not qualify | | | |
| Total | | 9 | 9 | 0 | .500 | | 0 | 0 | – | |

== Publications ==
- Rodgers, Pepper; Thomy, Al (1976). Pepper!: The autobiography of an unconventional coach. Doubleday. ISBN 9780385116671.
- Rodgers, Pepper (1984). Fourth and Long Gone. Peachtree Pub. ISBN 9780931948619.
