= List of photographers of the civil rights movement =

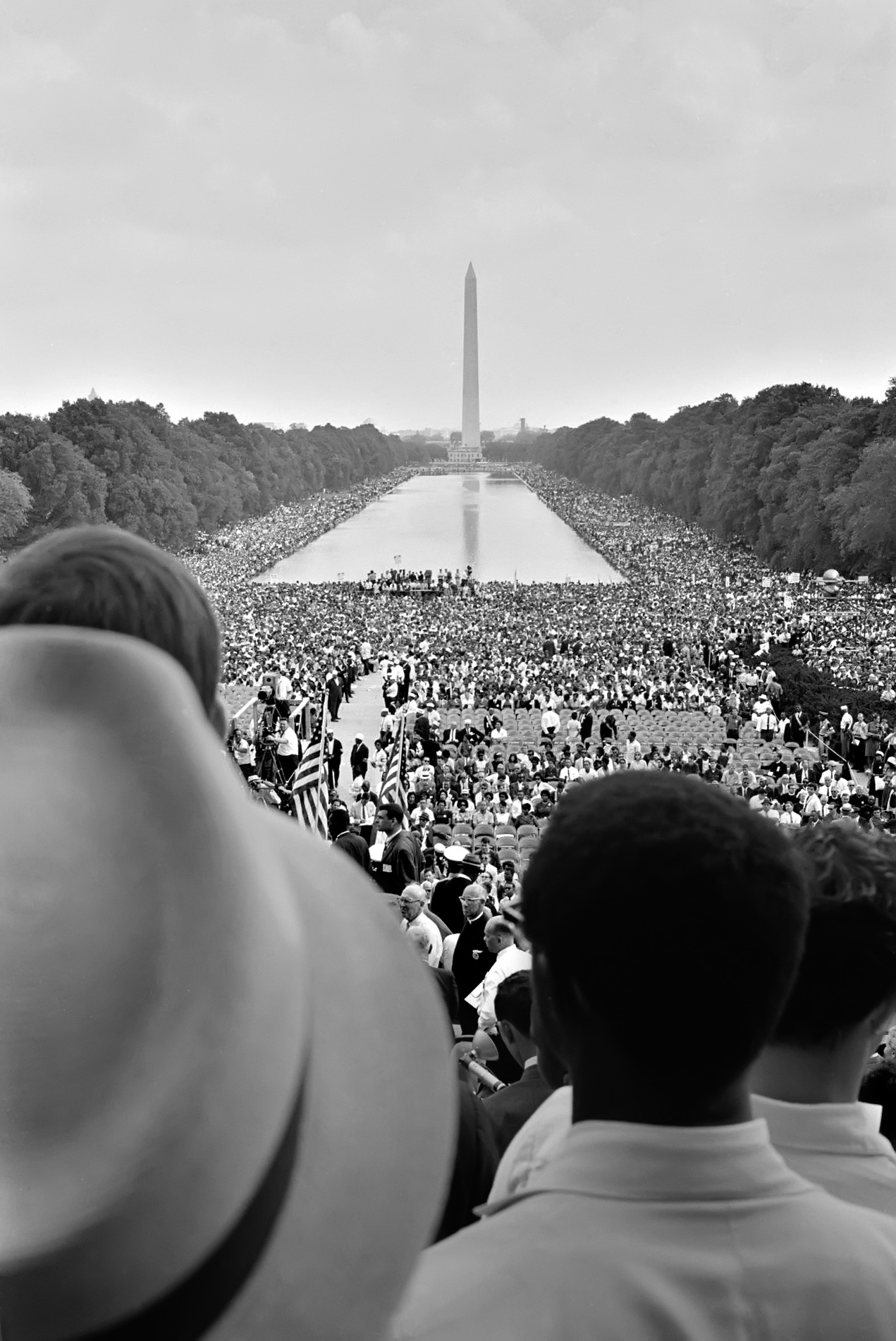
Warren K. Leffler's photograph of the March on Washington for Jobs and Freedom at the National Mall

Beginning with the murder of Emmett Till in 1955, photography and photographers played an important role in advancing the civil rights movement by documenting the public and private acts of racial discrimination against African Americans and the nonviolent response of the movement. This article focuses on these photographers and the role that they played in the movement between 1954 and 1968, particularly in the South.

== Notable photographers and the roles they played ==
- Bob Adelman (1931–2016), volunteered as a photographer for the Congress of Racial Equality (CORE) in the early 1960s and photographed the events and the now well-known people active in the civil rights movement at the time.
- James H. Barker, documented civil rights movement activity in Selma in the early 1960s.
- Dan Budnik (1933–2020), persuaded Life to have him create a long-term photo essay documenting the Selma to Montgomery march. His photographs are now in the collection of the Martin Luther King Jr. National Historic Site.
- Bruce Davidson (born 1933), chronicled the events and effects of the civil rights movement, in both the North and the South, from 1961 to 1965. In support of his project, Davidson received a Guggenheim Fellowship in 1962 and his finished project was displayed at the Museum of Modern Art in New York. Upon the completion of his documentation of the civil rights movement, Davidson received the first ever photography grant from the National Endowment for the Arts.
- Diana Davies (born 1938)
- Benedict J. Fernandez (1936–2021), extensively documented the 1968 Sanitation Worker's Strike in Memphis.
- Bob Fitch (1939–2016), Southern Christian Leadership Conference (SCLC) photographer in 1965 and 1966. His images includes school integration, voter registration actions, and candidate campaigns in Alabama, Mississippi and Georgia; the March Against Fear in Mississippi; and intimate photos of the King family during Dr. King's funeral. His pictures appeared nationally in Afro-American publications including Johnson Publishing's JET and EBONY. Fitch's photos appeared in the 1997 Smithsonian Exhibit "We Shall Overcome", and his portrait of Martin Luther King Jr. in his Atlanta, Georgia, office with a print of Mohandas Gandhi on the wall, is the model for the Martin Luther King Jr. Memorial monument in Washington, D.C.
- Jack T. Franklin (1922–2009)
- Leonard Freed (1929–2006), documented the March on Washington and other civil rights events.
- Jill Freedman (1939–2019), extensively documented the 1968 Poor People's Campaign in Washington, D.C.
- Gene Herrick (born 1926), Associated Press photojournalist, covered the Emmett Till trial, Autherine Lucy and the integration of the University of Alabama, the Montgomery bus boycott (photographing Rosa Parks and Martin Luther King Jr. being fingerprinted and booked), and the race riots in Clinton, Tennessee, in response to the integration of Clinton High School, and the assassination of Martin Luther King Jr.
- Matt Herron (1931–2020), documented the Freedom Summer of 1964. That year, he organized a team of five photographers, The Southern Documentary Project, in an attempt to record the changing racial landscape of Mississippi.
- R.C. Hickman (c. 1922–2007), documented the everyday life of African-Americans in Dallas, Texas, published in his book Behold the People in 1994. He also photographed the visitations of notable individuals such as Martin Luther King Jr. in Dallas.
- Bill Hudson (1932–2010), Associated Press photojournalist, depicted police brutality against peaceful protesters, including the police dogs attacking students marching to talk to Birmingham's mayor during the 1963 Birmingham Children's Crusade.
- David Johnson (1926–2024), first African American student of Ansel Adams, photographed the 1963 March on Washington.
- James H. Karales (1930–2002), photographer for Look magazine from 1960 to 1971, covered the civil rights movement throughout its duration and took many memorable photographs including photos of SNCC's formation, of Dr. King and his associates, and, during his full coverage of the event, the iconic photograph of the Selma to Montgomery march showing people proudly marching along the highway under a cloudy turbulent sky. In 2013 a book of his photographs, Controversy and Hope: The Civil Rights Movement Photographs of James Karales, was published by the University of South Carolina Press.
- Warren K. Leffler, photographer for U.S. News & World Report during the civil rights years. Although based primarily in Washington, D.C., Leffler also traveled to the South to cover many of the main events for the magazine.
- Danny Lyon (born 1942), published his first photographs working for the Student Nonviolent Coordinating Committee. His pictures appeared in The Movement, a documentary book about the Southern civil rights movement, as well as Memories of the Southern Civil Rights Movement, his own memoir of his years working for SNCC.
- James "Spider" Martin (1939–2003), took photographs documenting the March, 1965 beating of many of the marchers during the first Selma to Montgomery march, known as "Bloody Sunday". Speaking about the effect of photography on the civil rights movement, Martin Luther King Jr. said, "Spider, we could have marched, we could have protested forever, but if it weren't for guys like you it would have been for nothing. The whole world saw your pictures. That's why the Voting Rights Act was passed."
- Jack Moebes (1911–2002), only photographer to capture the Greensboro Four after they sat at the lunch counter in Greensboro, North Carolina, on February 1, 1960, arguably helping to precipitate the Civil Rights Sit-ins in other cities throughout the South. It appears in both the Smithsonian's American History and African American Museums and as widely in textbooks, magazines, books and other museums. Moebes documented numerous civil rights events in Greensboro over his 30-year career with the Greensboro News and Record from 1945 to 1975.
- Charles Moore (1931–2010), photographed a 1958 argument between Martin Luther King Jr. and two policemen. His photographs were distributed nationally by the Associated Press, and published in Life, and he began traveling throughout the South documenting the civil rights movement. Moore's most famous photograph, Birmingham, depicts demonstrators being attacked by firemen wielding high-pressure hoses. U.S. Senator Jacob Javits said that Moore's pictures "helped to spur passage of the Civil Rights Act of 1964."
- Gordon Parks (1912–2006), assigned by Life in 1963 to travel with Malcolm X and document the civil rights movement. He was also involved with the movement on a personal level. In 1947, Gordon Parks documented Drs. Kenneth B. and Mamie Phipps Clark's "Doll Test", pictures that were published in Ebony that year. The Doll Test was used as evidence in the Brown v. Board of Education trial and helped sway the ruling. Parks also photographed civil rights demonstrations, including the 1963 March on Washington, and documented Jim Crow Segregation for Life magazine.
- Jim Peppler, photographer for The Southern Courier in Montgomery, Alabama, during the civil rights movement and photographed several prominent leaders including Fred Shuttlesworth, Martin Luther King Jr. and Hosea Williams.
- Herbert Eugene Randall Jr. (born 1936), photographed the effects of the civil rights movement in Hattiesburg, Mississippi, in 1964, at the request of Sanford R. Leigh, the Director of Mississippi Freedom Summer's Hattiesburg project. Randall spent the entire summer photographing solely in Hattiesburg, among the African-American community and the volunteers in area projects such as the Freedom Schools, Voter Registration, and the Mississippi Freedom Democratic Party campaign. Five of Randall's photographs were published in the summer of 1964, and one seen worldwide was the bloodied, concussed Rabbi Arthur Lelyveld, head of a prominent Cleveland congregation and former conscientious objector to World War II. In 1999 Randall donated 1,800 negatives to the archives of The University of Southern Mississippi in Hattiesburg. He and Bobs Tusa, the archivist at USM, wrote Faces of Freedom Summer, which was published by the University of Alabama Press in 2001. Faces is the only record of a single town in the midst of America's civil rights movement.
- Steve Schapiro (1934–2022), photographed key moments of the civil rights movement such as the March on Washington for Jobs and Freedom and the Selma to Montgomery marches. He also documented Mississippi Freedom Summer. Schapiro's photo of John Lewis was the cover image of Time after Lewis's death.
- Flip Schulke (1930–2008), freelance photographer who traveled with Martin Luther King Jr. and took around 11,000 photographs of him.
- Robert A. Sengstacke (1943–2017), award-winning photojournalist during the Civil Rights era. He made portraits of Dr. Martin Luther King Jr., Malcolm X, and other prominent civil rights leaders.
- Art Shay (1922–2018), photographed the Chicago Freedom Movement. Working freelance for Life, the Saturday Evening Post, Time and other magazines, Shay started covering integration issues in 1953. In 1959 he covered the Deerfield Housing Crisis, in 1961 block busting, then the 1963 Freedom March, school boycotts, and Martin Luther King's 1966 Chicago Freedom Movement rally at Soldier Field. Shay also covered the 1966 Chicago and the 1967 Detroit riots.
- Moneta Sleet Jr. (1926–1996), won the 1969 Pulitzer Prize for Feature Photography for his photograph of Martin Luther King Jr.'s widow, Coretta Scott King, at Dr. King's funeral. Sleet is the first African American man to win the Pulitzer, and the first African American to win award for journalism.
- Maria Varela (born 1940), worked for the Student Non-Violent Coordinating Committee from 1963 to 1967 primarily in Alabama and Mississippi supporting civil rights organizers with educational materials and photographs. Varela authored several photo-based publications and filmstrips ranging from voter education training manuals to organizing co-operatives and farm-worker unions. Some of her movement photography appeared in La Revista Porque (Mexico City), Chicano Press Association newspapers, numerous civil rights movement texts and photo exhibits. Three exhibits, "We’ll Never Turn Back" (1980) and "This Light of Ours" (2013–14) and "Time to Get Ready" are traveling extensively across the US.
- Grey Villet (1927–2000), and other photographers and reporters, was assaulted in Little Rock, Arkansas, while covering protests after the Federal Government's attempts to desegregate public schools. After being attacked by segregationists he was arrested by the police and held for a few hours on unspecified charges. Villet also became notable for his photographs of Mildred and Richard Loving whose interracial marriage was declared illegal in Virginia. After a lengthy legal battle, the Supreme Court eventually found unanimously in their favor in 1967. Villet was assigned to the story in 1965 and spent two weeks with the Lovings.
- Tamio Wakayama (1941–2018), photographer for SNCC.
- Cecil J. Williams (born 1937), began photographing the origin of the civil rights movement in Clarendon County, and Orangeburg, South Carolina; and at eleven years old, beginning with Thurgood Marshall, arriving by train in Charleston, South Carolina to argue the Briggs v. Elliott case. His collection of nearly one million film images is perhaps one of the largest in the world. At fourteen years old, he became a freelancer for JET. Later, he regularly contributed to the Afro-American, Pittsburgh Courier, and other weekly publications. Some of the notable events he photographed include: the Briggs v. Elliott petitioners, Elloree School Teachers, Minister Billy Graham's 1957 New York Crusade at Madison Square Garden, Harvey Gantt being admitted to Clemson University, John F. Kennedy's presidential announcement, the Orangeburg Massacre, and the Charleston Hospital Workers Strike. His photograph of Coretta Scott King involved in the Charleston Hospital Workers Strike was featured on the front cover of JET. Other photographs he made appeared in Newsweek, TIME, and the Associated Press. He was twice arrested and jailed for photographing student demonstrations. In 2015, he invented the FilmToaster, a fast camera scanning instrument, to scan his mammoth film collection. Many of his iconic images from the era of civil rights have appeared on the covers of numerous historical publications.
- Ernest Withers (1922–2007), photographed African American history in the segregated South for over 60 years, including the Montgomery bus boycott, the Emmett Till murder trial, Sanitation Worker's Strike, Negro league baseball, and musicians related to Memphis blues and Memphis soul.

== See also ==
- Civil rights movement in popular culture
