= Harvard–Yale football rivalry =

American football university rivalry

The Game
- Harvard Crimson Yale Bulldogs
- Sport: Football
- First meeting: November 13, 1875; Harvard 4, Yale 0
- Latest meeting: November 21, 2026; Yale 20, Harvard 17
- Next meeting: 2027

Statistics
- Total meetings: 142
- All-time series: Yale leads, 73–61–8
- Largest victory: Yale, 54–0 (1957)
- Longest win streak: Harvard, 9 (2007–2015)
- Current win streak: Yale, 5 (2022–present)

Locations of Yale and Harvard

The Harvard–Yale football rivalry, also known as The Game, is an American college football match between the Crimson football team of Harvard University and the Bulldogs football team of Yale University.

Though the winner does not take possession of a physical prize, the matchup is usually considered the most important and anticipated game of the year for both teams, regardless of their season records. The Game is scheduled annually as the last contest of the year for both teams. As the Ivy League did not participate in postseason play for football until 2025, The Game used to be the final scheduled outing for both teams' graduating seniors. Some years, the rivalry carries the additional significance of deciding the Ivy League championship.

The weekend of The Game includes more than just the varsity matchup; the respective Yale residential college football teams compete against "sister" Harvard house teams the day before. The Game is third among most-played NCAA Division I football rivalries. Yale leads the series 72–61–8.

"Harvard and Yale generally duke it out in the academic arena", but geographic proximity, the history of Yale's founding and social competition between the respective student and alumni bodies animate the athletic rivalry.

Former Harvard football head coach Joe Restic, who held the position for 23 seasons, quipped regarding his relationship with former Yale football head coach and National Football Foundation/College Football Hall of Fame member Carm Cozza, who held the position for 32 seasons: "Each year, we're friends for 364 days and rivals for one."

The signature Harvard fight song, "Ten Thousand Men of Harvard", names Yale in the famous final stanza. The song is sung in the Harvard football locker room after a victory regardless of the opponent. The song is among six Harvard fight songs that mention Yale. "Down the Field" is Yale's signature fight song and Harvard is the named foe. The song is among five that mention Harvard. Two of the songs, "Bingo, That's the Lingo" and "Goodnight, Harvard", have been sung substituting Princeton for Harvard when appropriate. Cole Porter composed the former and Douglas Moore the latter.

The football rivalry is among the most admired rivalries on the American athletic scene. The schools and the rivalry established the template for American college football. The Game is the most prominent athletic contest between the schools and has accounted for many of either rival's best-publicized athletic feats. Sports Illustrated (College Edition) rated the athletic rivalry sixth-best among American athletic collegiate rivalries behind, in order, Alabama–Auburn, Duke–North Carolina, UCLA–USC, Army–Navy and Cal–Stanford. The football rivalry was ranked 8th among Athlon Sports's top 25 rivalries in the history of college football.

== Significance ==
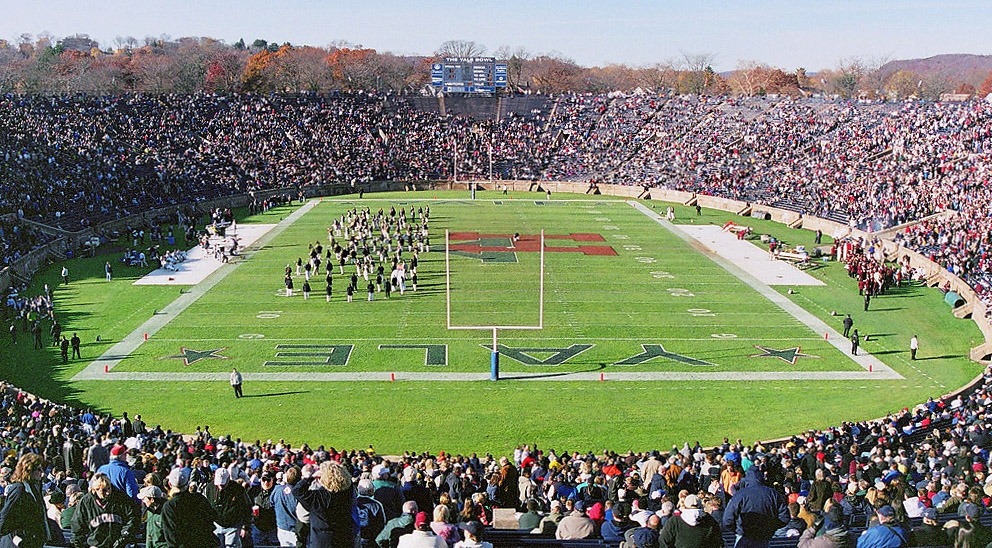
Half-time festivities during The Game at Yale Bowl, November 2001

"A whale-ship was my Yale College and my Harvard" from Moby-Dick by Herman Melville exemplifies public fascination beyond athletics with both institutions. Twelve past presidents of the United States have earned an undergraduate or professional degree from one of the universities. The list includes: John Adams, John Quincy Adams, George Herbert Walker Bush, George Walker Bush, Bill Clinton, Gerald Ford, Rutherford B. Hayes, John F. Kennedy, Barack Obama, Franklin D. Roosevelt, Theodore Roosevelt and William Howard Taft.

Theodore Roosevelt, a fan of football, is considered often the savior of football in the early 20th century. Roosevelt, who attended the second Harvard–Yale game as a first year student at Harvard College in 1876, has been quoted, "In life as in football, the principle to follow is hit the line hard". Roosevelt suggested turn-of-the-century "manly virtues" were taught and reinforced on the gridiron.

Walter Camp, captain of the 1878 and 1879 Yale football teams, is considered often "the father" of American football and its most ardent popularizer. Camp attended almost every important rule committee meeting for the sport to his death in 1925 while napping between sessions of the Intercollegiate Football Rule Committee. Camp attended a rules meeting for the sport when he was a student at Hopkins School in New Haven, Connecticut. Camp wrote professionally about the sport, popularizing All-American teams with Caspar Whitney for This Week's Sports magazine. Eventually Collier's magazine featured the annual selections.

The rivalry has been noted in American athletic and popular culture. The University of Mississippi's first football team, organized by Alexander Bondurant, adopted Yale blue and crimson for team colors in 1893. Newspapers printed Bull Tales, Garry Trudeau's collegiate precursor to Doonesbury published in the Yale Daily News, often featuring Brian Dowling and Calvin Hill, in the run-up to the 1968 Yale vs. Harvard football game. "Burns, Baby Burns", the fourth episode in the eighth season of The Simpsons, depicts Mr. Burns returning to Springfield, Massachusetts after attending The Game.

Thomas G. Bergin, better known for commentary on The Divine Comedy and longtime Sterling Professor of Romance languages at Yale University, authored The Game: The Harvard Yale Football Rivalry 1875 – 1983, published in 1984.

Owen Johnson's Dink Stover, Gilbert Patten's Frank Merriwell and F. Scott Fitzgerald's Tom Buchanan played football for Yale.

=== Historical significance ===
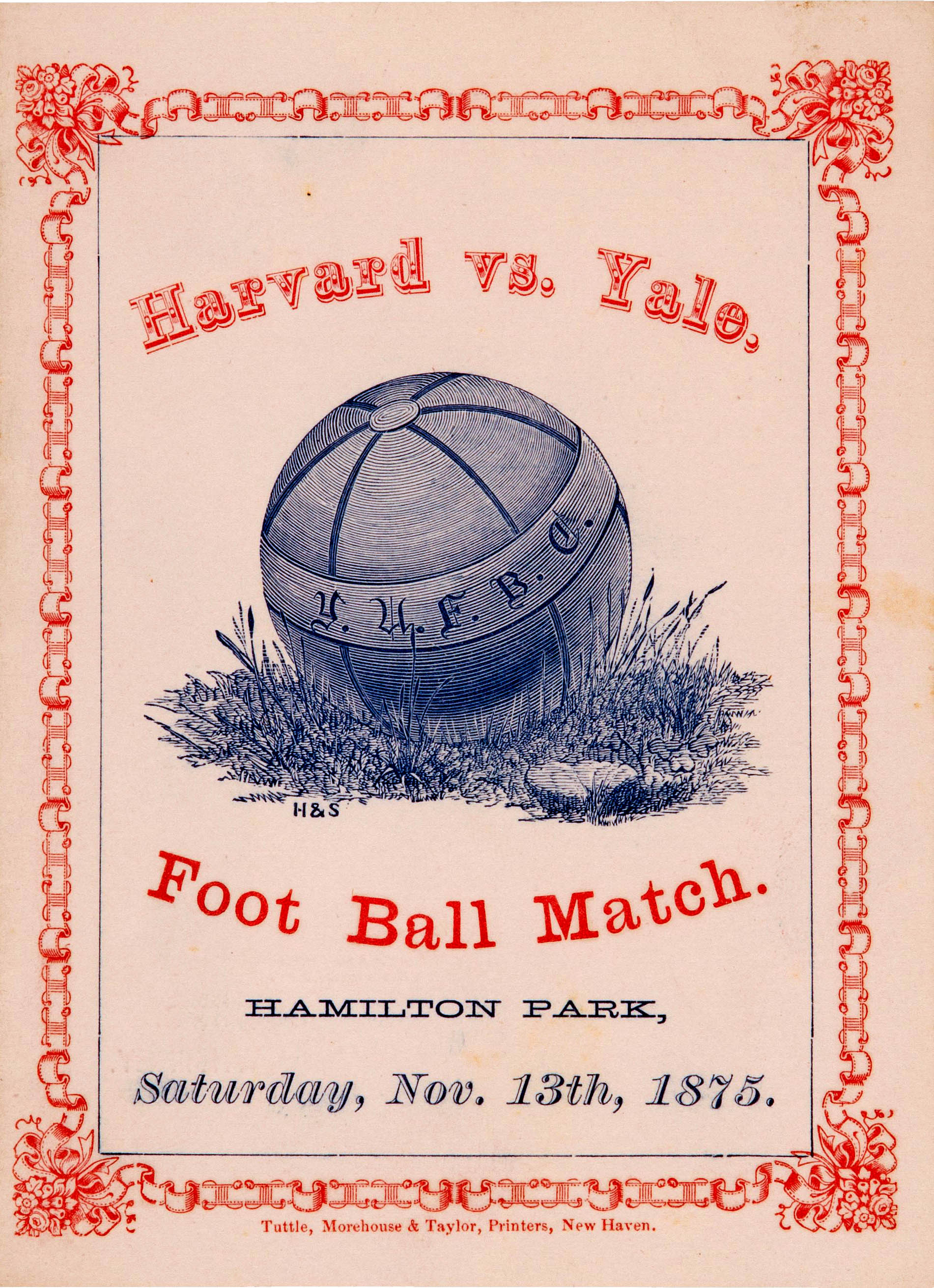
Program for the "Foot Ball Match", Harvard versus Yale, the first intercollegiate rugby football game between Ivy League teams. The two teams played with 15 players on a side

The first contest was held in 1875, two years after the inaugural Princeton – Yale football contest. Harvard athlete Nathaniel Curtis challenged Yale's captain, William Arnold to a rugby-style game. The next season Curtis was captain. He took one look at Walter Camp, then only 156 pounds, and told Yale captain Gene Baker "You don't mean to let that child play, do you? ... He will get hurt."

The Harvard-Yale series is the third most played rivalry in collegiate football history, including 139 games since 1875. In the series, Yale has 70 wins, Harvard has 61 wins, and the teams have tied eight times. Only two collegiate rivalries have played more often than Harvard-Yale. Princeton and Yale have played 143 times since 1873, and Lafayette College and Lehigh University (known simply as "The Rivalry"), have played the most, 157 games, dating back to 1884.

Yale and Harvard have played major roles in advancing and shaping intercollegiate athletics. The first American intercollegiate sporting event took place August 3, 1852 after Yale invited Harvard to a race of crews. The first intercollegiate contests in ice hockey, soccer or five-on-five basketball contests featured teams from Harvard and Yale. Many now century-old aspects of American football were introduced by Harvard or Yale students or athletes. Yale introduced cheerleading at athletic events in 1890. Harvard introduced spring practice to collegiate football March 14, 1889. Yalies sang "Hold the Fort" during the 1892 Harvard game, considered the first public performance of a collegiate "fight song".

=== Reform and Roosevelt ===
Years later, representatives from Harvard, Yale and Princeton were summoned to the White House October 9, 1905, by Theodore Roosevelt to discuss reforms to mitigate unnecessarily violent, unsportsmanlike play and minimize resultant fatalities and injuries in football. Roosevelt sought reform of rules to quell misgivings about the sport he admired. The New York Times, Harper's, McClure's and The Nation advocated reform if not abolishment of the sport. The era's progressives, muckrakers, university faculties and presidents—particularly at Harvard, led by its president, Charles W. Eliot and NYU, led by its president Henry MacCracken—and the general public had misgivings about the sport's safety and place in higher and secondary school education. Walter Camp, Bill Reid, and Arthur T. Hillebrand attended the meeting, representing respectively Yale, Harvard and Princeton.

The "Grim Reaper Smiles on the Goalposts" cartoon, published December 3, 1905, in the Cincinnati Commercial Tribune depicting the Grim Reaper sitting on the crossbar of a goalpost overlooking a mound of uniformed dead bodies exhibited how the press presented the problem. November 25 Union College halfback Harold Moore was knocked unconscious in a game versus NYU. Moore, age 19, died of a cerebral hemorrhage six hours later. MacCracken called a meeting of university leaders to suggest protective gear be worn by the athletes. Reformers requested deemphasis or suspension of the sport. The press reported that 18 athletes, 15 of whom were high school students, died from football-related injuries during the 1905 season. The era has been described as the "first concussion crisis" for the sport.

A meeting convened December 28, 1905, with 62 schools represented to appoint a rules committee. January 12 the American Football Rules Committee met. March 31 the Intercollegiate Athletic Association of the United States was established, the corporate forerunner to the NCAA.

Rules were changed: the flying wedge was banned, the neutral zone was created, and the distance increased to ten yards from five yards for a first down.

=== Council of Ivy Group Presidents ===
Decades later the eight universities that administer athletic programs and competition under the auspices of the Council of Ivy Group Presidents, better known as the Ivy League, reiterated reforms rooted in requests made during the series of meetings. Agreements among the athletics departments at Harvard, Yale and Princeton in 1906, 1916 (the "Three Presidents Agreements" on eligibility), and a revision of that agreement in 1923 have been considered precursors to the Ivy Group Agreement, each agreement addressing amateurism and college football.

The Ivy Group Agreement, adopted in 1945, states for football, "the players be truly representative of the student body and not comprised of a group of special recruited and trained athletes". Harvard president Nathan Pusey and Yale president A. Whitney Griswold collaborated closely toward the eventual implementation of the Ivy League in 1954 with the "Agreement" extended to all sports. Round-robin play started in 1956 for football among programs representing Brown University, Columbia University, Cornell University, Dartmouth College, Harvard University, Princeton University, University of Pennsylvania, and Yale University.

== Game results ==
Harvard victories	Yale victories

No.	Date	Location	Winner	Score
1	November 13, 1875	Yale	Harvard	4–0
2	November 18, 1876	Yale	Yale	1–0
3	November 23, 1878	Harvard	Yale	1–0
4	November 8, 1879	Yale	Tie	0–0
5	November 20, 1880	Harvard	Yale	1–0
6	November 12, 1881	Yale	Tie	0–0 († Yale win)
7	November 25, 1882	Harvard	Yale	1–0
8	November 29, 1883	New York, NY	Yale	23–2
9	November 22, 1884	Yale	Yale	52–0
10	November 20, 1886	Harvard	Yale	29–4
11	November 24, 1887	Yale	Yale	17–8
12	November 23, 1889	Springfield, MA	Yale	6–0
13	November 22, 1890	Springfield, MA	Harvard	12–6
14	November 21, 1891	Springfield, MA	Yale	10–0
15	November 19, 1892	Springfield, MA	Yale	6–0
16	November 25, 1893	Springfield, MA	Yale	6–0
17	November 24, 1894	Springfield, MA	Yale	12–4
18	November 13, 1897	Harvard	Tie	0–0
19	November 19, 1898	Yale	Harvard	17–0
20	November 18, 1899	Harvard	Tie	0–0
21	November 24, 1900	Yale	Yale	28–0
22	November 23, 1901	Harvard	Harvard	22–0
23	November 22, 1902	Yale	Yale	23–0
24	November 26, 1903	Harvard	Yale	16–0
25	November 19, 1904	Yale	Yale	12–0
26	November 25, 1905	Harvard	Yale	6–0
27	November 24, 1906	Yale	Yale	6–0
28	November 23, 1907	Harvard	Yale	12–0
29	November 21, 1908	Yale	Harvard	4–0
30	November 20, 1909	Harvard	Yale	8–0
31	November 19, 1910	Yale	Tie	0–0
32	November 25, 1911	Harvard	Tie	0–0
33	November 23, 1912	Yale	Harvard	20–0
34	November 22, 1913	Harvard	Harvard	15–5
35	November 21, 1914	Yale	Harvard	36–0
36	November 20, 1915	Harvard	Harvard	41–0
37	November 25, 1916	Yale	Yale	6–3
38	November 22, 1919	Harvard	Harvard	10–3
39	November 20, 1920	Yale	Harvard	9–0
40	November 19, 1921	Harvard	Harvard	10–3
41	November 25, 1922	Yale	Harvard	10–3
42	November 24, 1923	Harvard	Yale	13–0
43	November 22, 1924	Yale	Yale	19–6
44	November 21, 1925	Harvard	Tie	0–0
45	November 20, 1926	Yale	Yale	12–7
46	November 19, 1927	Harvard	Yale	14–0
47	November 24, 1928	Yale	Harvard	17–0
48	November 23, 1929	Harvard	Harvard	10–6
49	November 22, 1930	Yale	Harvard	13–0
50	November 21, 1931	Harvard	Yale	3–0
51	November 19, 1932	Yale	Yale	19–0
52	November 25, 1933	Harvard	Harvard	19–6
53	November 24, 1934	Yale	Yale	14–0
54	November 21, 1935	Harvard	Yale	14–7
55	November 21, 1936	Yale	Yale	14–13
56	November 20, 1937	Harvard	Harvard	13–6
57	November 19, 1938	Yale	Harvard	7–0
58	November 25, 1939	Harvard	Yale	20–7
59	November 23, 1940	Yale	Harvard	28–0
60	November 22, 1941	Harvard	Harvard	14–0
61	November 21, 1942	Yale	Yale	7–3
62	December 1, 1945	Yale	Yale	28–0
63	November 23, 1946	Harvard	Yale	27–14
64	November 22, 1947	Yale	Yale	31–21
65	November 20, 1948	Harvard	Harvard	20–7
66	November 19, 1949	Yale	Yale	29–6
67	November 25, 1950	Harvard	Yale	14–6
68	November 24, 1951	Yale	Tie	21–21
69	November 22, 1952	Harvard	Yale	41–14
70	November 21, 1953	Yale	Harvard	13–0
71	November 20, 1954	Harvard	Harvard	13–9
72	November 19, 1955	Yale	Yale	21–7

No.	Date	Location	Winner	Score
73	November 24, 1956	Harvard	Yale	42–14
74	November 23, 1957	Yale	Yale	54–0
75	November 22, 1958	Harvard	Harvard	28–0
76	November 21, 1959	Yale	Harvard	35–6
77	November 19, 1960	Harvard	Yale	39–6
78	November 25, 1961	Yale	Harvard	27–0
79	November 24, 1962	Harvard	Harvard	14–6
80	November 23, 1963	Yale	Yale	20–6
81	November 21, 1964	Harvard	Harvard	18–14
82	November 20, 1965	Yale	Harvard	13–0
83	November 19, 1966	Harvard	Harvard	17–0
84	November 25, 1967	Yale	Yale	24–20
85	November 23, 1968	Harvard	Tie	29–29
86	November 22, 1969	Yale	Yale	7–0
87	November 21, 1970	Harvard	Harvard	14–12
88	November 20, 1971	Yale	Harvard	35–16
89	November 25, 1972	Harvard	Yale	28–17
90	November 24, 1973	Yale	Yale	35–0
91	November 23, 1974	Harvard	Harvard	21–16
92	November 22, 1975	Yale	Harvard	10–7
93	November 13, 1976	Harvard	Yale	21–7
94	November 12, 1977	Yale	Yale	24–7
95	November 18, 1978	Harvard	Yale	35–28
96	November 17, 1979	Yale	Harvard	22–7
97	November 22, 1980	Harvard	Yale	14–0
98	November 21, 1981	Yale	Yale	28–0
99	November 20, 1982	Harvard	Harvard	45–7
100	November 19, 1983	Yale	Harvard	16–7
101	November 24, 1984	Harvard	Yale	30–27
102	November 23, 1985	Yale	Yale	17–6
103	November 22, 1986	Harvard	Harvard	24–17
104	November 21, 1987	Yale	Harvard	14–10
105	November 19, 1988	Harvard	Yale	26–17
106	November 18, 1989	Yale	Harvard	37–20
107	November 17, 1990	Harvard	Yale	34–19
108	November 23, 1991	Yale	Yale	23–13
109	November 21, 1992	Harvard	Harvard	14–0
110	November 20, 1993	Yale	Yale	33–31
111	November 19, 1994	Harvard	Yale	32–13
112	November 18, 1995	Yale	Harvard	22–21
113	November 23, 1996	Harvard	Harvard	26–21
114	November 22, 1997	Yale	Harvard	17–7
115	November 21, 1998	Harvard	Yale	9–7
116	November 20, 1999	Yale	Yale	24–21
117	November 18, 2000	Harvard	Yale	34–24
118	November 17, 2001	Yale	Harvard	35–23
119	November 23, 2002	Harvard	Harvard	20–13
120	November 22, 2003	Yale	Harvard	37–19
121	November 20, 2004	Harvard	Harvard	35–3
122	November 19, 2005	Yale	Harvard	30–24^{3OT}
123	November 18, 2006	Harvard	Yale	34–13
124	November 17, 2007	Yale	Harvard	37–6
125	November 22, 2008	Harvard	Harvard	10–0
126	November 21, 2009	Yale	Harvard	14–10
127	November 20, 2010	Harvard	Harvard	28–21
128	November 19, 2011	Yale	Harvard	45–7
129	November 17, 2012	Harvard	Harvard	34–24
130	November 23, 2013	Yale	Harvard	34–7
131	November 22, 2014‡	Harvard	Harvard	31–24
132	November 21, 2015	Yale	Harvard	38–19
133	November 19, 2016	Harvard	Yale	21–14
134	November 18, 2017	Yale	Yale	24–3
135	November 17, 2018	Fenway Park	Harvard	45–27
136	November 23, 2019	Yale	Yale	50–43^{2OT}
137	November 20, 2021	Yale	Harvard	34–31
138	November 19, 2022	Harvard	Yale	19–14
139	November 18, 2023	Yale	Yale	23–18
140	November 23, 2024	Harvard	Yale	34–29
141	November 22, 2025	Yale	Yale	45–28
142	November 21, 2026	Fenway	Yale	20–17
Series: Yale leads 73–61–8

† The 1881 game is recognized by both teams as a Yale victory due to four fewer safeties.

‡ Hosted ESPN's College Gameday.

All games since 1956 are Ivy League contests. The teams did not play in 2020 due to the Ivy League cancelling the 2020 football season because of the COVID-19 pandemic.

Regular season overtime was introduced for Division I-AA in 1981 and was first used in the 2005 game.

== Stadiums ==
The contests are hosted in stadiums listed on the U.S. National Register of Historical Places and are U.S. National Historic Landmarks. They are among the oldest gridiron football stadiums.

=== Yale Bowl ===
Designs for the Rose Bowl and Michigan Stadium were influenced by the Yale Bowl Stadium. When the Bowl was built by Charles Ferry in 1914, the Colosseum of Pompeii in Italy was the only other known structure in the world engineered by digging a hole then using the displaced dirt to build the surrounding wall or berm. The Bowl had the largest seating capacity for a stadium in the world upon completion of construction. Head coach Carm Cozza likened the feeling of running through the tunnel onto the Bowl to a gladiator entering the arena.

The Yale Bowl, completed before World War I, presaged a collegiate stadium-building blitz associated with the game's popularity in the Roaring Twenties. The modern era of college football, with radio broadcasts coast to coast of gridiron exploits by Red Grange or the Four Horsemen of Notre Dame, began soon after the construction of stadiums that rivaled the Yale Bowl's seating capacity. The Rose Bowl venue, its annual post-season contest, and the plethora of venues and post-season football contests known as "bowls" has been attributed to the Yale Bowl.

Walter Camp had been the long-tenured treasurer of the Yale Athletic Union, precursor to the later professional athletic department administration. Yale swim athlete and team manager Robert Moses—acknowledged later in life as the power broker of urban planning and a "master builder"—had disagreements with Camp regarding the Athletic Union's treasury. Moses wrote editorials in two campus papers and lobbied Camp and the administration for larger sums for the minor sports (every sport save football, rowing and hockey) from the fund swelled by football receipts. Camp conceded little. Camp's big idea was to fund eventually the Yale Bowl Stadium.

The Walter Camp Memorial Arch greets visitors to the Walter Camp Fields on Derby Avenue in front of the Bowl. A seven-person committee, including Yale Law School Dean Robert Hutchins, who would later abolish a storied football program at University of Chicago, raised money for the arch from a variety of sources, including 224 colleges and universities, and 279 high schools and prep schools.

=== Harvard Stadium ===
Harvard Stadium was built in 1903. The 25th Anniversary Reunion gift by the Harvard Class of 1879 funded the project.

The stadium is the nation's oldest permanent concrete structure dedicated to intercollegiate athletics. The stadium mimics the Panathenaic Stadium. Henry Lee Higginson, founder of the Boston Symphony Orchestra and first president of the Harvard Club of Boston, donated the land, known as Soldier's Field, for a memorial to Harvard men who were killed during the American Civil War.

Camp accommodated Harvard on the issue of widening the playing field to "open up" play from the almost perpetual rugby scrum that characterized the sport. The rules reform movement, which gained impetus after the 1905 meeting at the White House, demanded action. The present standardized playing field width was as wide as could be accommodated in Harvard Stadium, the first football stadium constructed with reinforced concrete and a pioneering execution in the construction of large structures. The forward pass was adopted instead of an even wider field. The rule change is mentioned often as the most important in the history of the sport. John Heisman championed the forward pass and is credited with lobbying successfully influential members of the IIAUS American Football Rules Committee to adopt the change.

=== Other venues ===
Although the rivalry is predominantly held at either school's home stadiums, it has taken place at neutral venues as well.

The 1883 game took place at the Polo Grounds in New York City. Harvard's faculty initially forbade the team from playing in condemnation of a game-altering illegal substitution during their 1882 meeting. Had it been called off, Yale would have lost $1,500 in revenue. Yale students and Harvard players protested the ruling, while reports indicated the Polo Grounds had legal grounds to sue the schools for breach of contract if it was not played. The Harvard administration subsequently permitted the game on the conditions that the referee was an alumnus of either school, Columbia, or Princeton (where he ultimately came from), and that the rules were amended to crack down on illegal subs. The New-York Tribune remarked that the controversy helped stoke public interest in the game.

From 1889 to 1894, the game took place at Hampden Park in Springfield, Massachusetts.

Fenway Park, primarily a baseball park used by the Boston Red Sox, hosted the rivalry for the first time in 2018 to commemorate the 50th anniversary of the 1968 game. The 2026 meeting was also moved to Fenway.

== Notable contests ==
=== 1875 ===
The game, a rugby contest in fact but called "Foot Ball", played November 13 in New Haven at Hamilton Park was won by Harvard. The "Foot Ball Match" was played under "concessionary rules". Harvard conceded to aspects of the soccer-like "Foot Ball" played by Yale while Yale conceded likewise to Harvard's rugby-informed play, featured in the Harvard–McGill game of 1874.

The contest has been noted as the first ever when both teams donned coordinated uniforms. The teams fielded fifteen athletes to a side. Through plebiscite, Harvard students picked crimson over magenta as the school color and athletic nickname.

Yale would win consecutively ten games and tie once before Harvard would win again, 12–6, in 1890, a season Harvard claimed a national championship. Harvard's record in the series was once 9–23–5 through the start of World War I. "Harvard felt a certain loss of manhood in not winning a single football game with Yale in the eighties and only to win one in the nineties", historian Samuel Eliot Morison noted in Three Centuries of Harvard 1636–1936.

=== 1876 ===
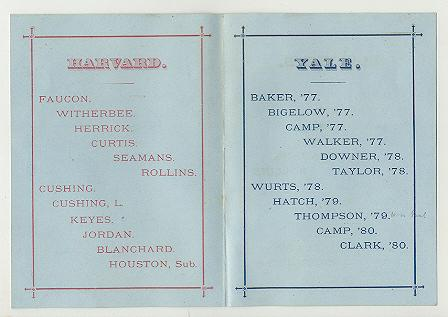
1876 game lineups

The 1876 game was the first won by Yale, and the first game Walter Camp played. Eugene V. Baker was the captain. O. D. Thompson scored on Harvard.

=== 1887 ===
On November 24, the year's Thanksgiving holiday, Yale defeated Harvard, 17–8, at the Polo Grounds in New York City before 18,000 spectators. Harvard had yielded six points total the entire season. For the third time in the brief history of the rivalry both squads sported undefeated and untied records. William H. Corbin, the 1888 team captain and future Yale head coach known as "Pa" Corbin, is credited with leading Yale to the victory and a 9–0 record, with Harvard's season ending with a 10–1 record. The game ball was discovered and picked up by an oyster boat in the water in March 1890 and returned to Yale.

=== 1890 ===
The 1890 game was played on November 22 at Hampden Park in Springfield, Massachusetts. Harvard ended the season undefeated and untied, 11–0, defeating Yale, 12–6. Yale finished the season with a 12–1 record. The victory is considered possibly the greatest in the history of Harvard Crimson football and Arthur Cumnock, team captain, as Harvard's greatest football player. Harvard won its second game in the series and ended a streak that included one tie.

=== 1891 ===
The 1891 game was held on November 21, again in Springfield, again with Harvard and Yale undefeated and untied for the contest; Yale won 10–0. Yale finished the season with a 13–0 record. Harvard, nursing a 23-game win streak over two seasons, ended the season 13–1.

The play of the game was a fumble returned for a touchdown by Laurie Bliss. Frank Hinkey separated Crimson back Hamilton Forbush Corbett from the ball that Bliss retrieved on the fly.

=== 1892 ===
Harvard introduced the flying wedge to football November 19 at the beginning of the second half before 21,000 spectators. Captain Vance McCormack warned his Yale teammates upon witnessing the formation, "Boys, this is something new but play the game as you have been taught. Keep your eyes open and do not let them draw you in".

Lorin F. Deland, an unpaid adviser to the Harvard team and an avid chess player, suggested the tactic. Yale won, 6–0.

The flying wedge was outlawed two years after its introduction. Bergin writes, "The legacy of the wedge is perceptible in the austere rules of today's game, by which a 'man in motion' can run away from the line literally, but if he takes a step forward before the ball is snapped his team is penalized. Offensive lineman must not move a muscle or even turn their heads before the snap."

Deland would coach Harvard for three games in 1895 and co-author with Walter Camp the seminal Football published in 1896.

Mass-momentum plays based on the flying wedge were the rage in the sport. The result was mayhem that eventually prompted intervention in 1905 by Teddy Roosevelt to help reform rules governing play.

=== 1894 ===
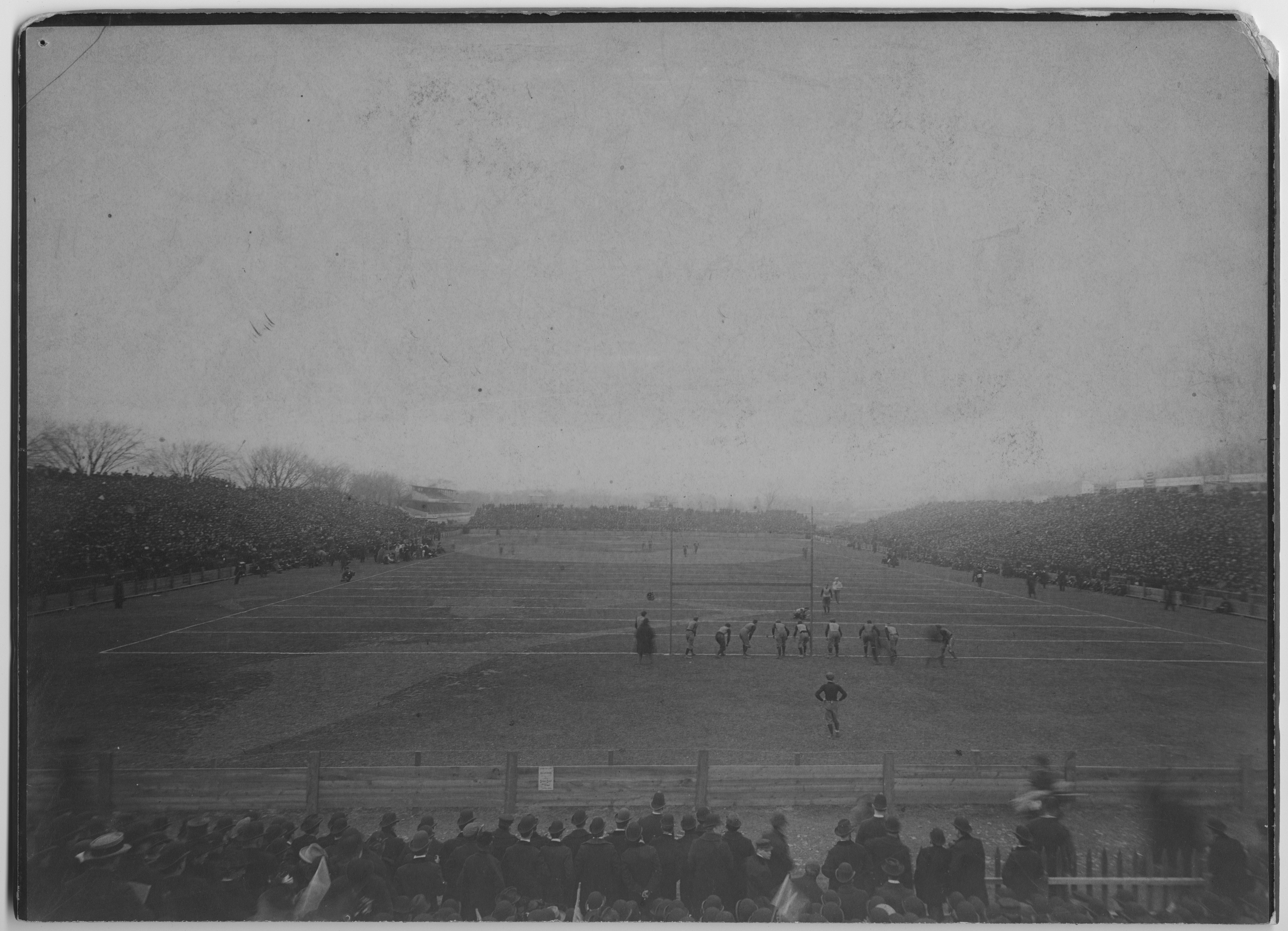
1894 game at Hampden Park

Held on November 24, Yale won the 1894 game 12–4, at Hampden Park. The contest, a bloody mess of a game, was known for on-field and off-field violence. In an era before players employed protective equipment of any type, the result of rough play was a given; however, competition between the Yale and Harvard football programs was placed on hiatus, seven players denoted in "dying condition" after the contest, according to the German daily newspaper Munchener Nachrichten.

Frank Hinkey has been alleged to have broken the collarbone of a Harvard player following a fair catch. Yale tackle Fred Murphy broke the nose of Harvard's Bob Hallowell during an official's conference; in turn, Murphy absorbed a hard hit later in the contest that hospitalized him. Rumors circulated after the game that he died in a local hospital. Violence ensued among fans in the streets of Springfield.

The Harvard faculty voted by a two-to-one margin to abolish football. Harvard president Charles W. Eliot supported the faculty. Eliot opined, "Football is to academics what bull fighting is to agriculture".

The Harvard Corporation sided, however, with alumni and students who championed the sport. The Harvard Board of Overseers invited Camp to chair an investigative committee to determine the extent of "character-building" as well as "brutality" on college and prep school football fields. Rev. Joseph Twichell, Endicott Peabody and Henry E. Howland were among the committee's members.

Ray Tompkins, a former teammate of Camp's, as well as a two-time captain at the guard position, confided to Camp during the crisis of '94 that football was too American to be abrogated by any one or more faculty. Tompkins later would be namesake to the building, Ray Tompkins House, that serves as the administrative headquarters for Yale athletics.

Yale and Harvard took a two-year hiatus on the football rivalry. The programs have played annually ever since, excluding the World War I and World War II years and in 2020 due to the COVID-19 pandemic.

=== 1898 ===
On the November 19 game, two future members of the National Football Foundation/College Football Hall of Fame showcased apt athletic and leadership ability, leading Harvard to a 17–0 victory. Both would later coach the Crimson. Bill Reid, a fullback, scored two touchdowns versus Yale. Harvard achieved a rare victory in the series, its third in 19 contests. Reid was rewarded with his picture published in Harper's Weekly. Percy D. Haughton was on the gridiron, too, for the Crimson.

The now traditional end of season scheduling started this date and continues to the present.

=== 1900 ===
On November 24 in Orange, Connecticut at Yale Field, the undefeated and untied Harvard and Yale teams met once more, with Yale winning 28–0. Gordon Brown, a four-time first team All American at the guard position, captained a team that held eleven of thirteen opponents scoreless.

=== 1903 ===
On November 21, Harvard hosted Yale at Harvard Stadium for the first time. Yale won, 16–0, before an estimated crowd of 40,000.

Harvard opened the facility with a game versus Dartmouth the week before.

=== 1905 ===
November 25 was the conclusion of another undefeated, untied season for Yale. An estimated crowd of 43,000 at Soldiers Field witnessed a 6–0 Yale win and enough violent play to prompt the delivery of a note from the benefactor who donated to Soldiers Field to Harvard, Henry Lee Higginson, to Crimson head coach Bill Reid. The note requested the withdrawal of the Crimson team from the playing field; Reid ignored the request.

Bob Forbes was the only player to cross the goal line.

Harvard finished the season 8–2–1, Yale 10–0.

=== 1908 ===
The game played November 21 marked the end of a six-game winning streak for Yale. Harvard won, 4–0, on a field goal by Victor Kennard, a fullback, at Yale Field in Orange, Connecticut. Hamilton Fish III, captain of the 1909 team (and acting captain 1908 when that year's captain was injured) was a mainstay at tackle the 1907–1909 seasons.

Percy Haughton, Harvard's first professional coach, was understood to have strangled to death a bulldog during the pregame pep talk. This contest was his first as a head coach versus Yale. Contemporary research concludes that at worse Haughton "strangled" a papier mache bulldog and tied another such creation to the back fender of his automobile.

=== 1909 ===
On November 20 in Boston, Harvard and Yale competed for the national championship. Ted Coy captained the Yale squad which shutout Harvard, 8–0. Coy threw a touchdown pass and Harvard didn't advance pass the Yale 30 yard line the entire contest. Harvard fielded two future NFF/College Football Hall of Fame members, Bob Fisher—a future head coach for the Crimson—and Hamilton Fish. The pair were respectively right guard and right tackle on offense. Their coach Percy Haughton also would win election to the Hall of Fame.

Harvard would dominate the series from 1909 to 1922, earning an 8–1–2 record.

=== 1914 ===
The game played on November 21 was the inaugural event at the Yale Bowl. William Howard Taft and Theodore Roosevelt were said to be among the spectators, a throng estimated at between 70,000 and 74,000. Harvard won, 36–0.

The day's memorable play was a 98-yard touchdown run after a recovered fumble by Jeff Coolidge. Coolidge gathered the Yale fumble with Harvard leading by two touchdowns.

"Yale has the Bowl but Harvard has the punch" was reportedly repeated often in the press the next day.

=== 1915 ===
On November 20, Harvard defeated Yale 41–0, the program's largest margin of victory in the series. Team captain Eddie Mahan scored four touchdowns and kicked five extra points.

The week before the Yale game and subsequent to the Brown game, won 16–7 by Harvard, William J. Bingham, a track star and team captain, authored an announcement under byline in the November 15 issue of the Harvard Crimson. Bingham thought poorly of the cheering and singing among students at the Brown game and announced a pep rally for Thursday to support Mahan and head coach Haughton before the Yale game. Bingham was appointed Harvard's first athletic director a decade later. He held the position 1926–1951. Harvard's most prestigious athletic award is named in his honor, the winner announced at the Harvard Varsity Club's annual Senior Letterwinner Dinner.

=== 1919 ===
Harvard coach Bob Fisher's team concluded an undefeated regular season November 22 with a 10–3 victory at the Stadium before an estimated crowd of 50,000.

Arnold Horween, who would later coach the Crimson, kicked a field goal and Eddie Casey scored on a reception in the first half. Robert Sedgwick helped anchor an outstanding offensive and defensive line that day and throughout the season. Only one touchdown was scored against Harvard during the season.

Harvard won later the 1920 East–West Tournament Bowl, now known as the Rose Bowl, versus the Oregon Webfoots, now known as the Oregon Ducks, 10–7.

=== 1920 ===
Harvard dominated completely Yale at the Bowl, 9–0, before an estimated crowd of nearly 80,000. Charles Buell kicked two field goals and Arnold Horween kicked one while Harvard controlled the line of scrimmage. The Harvard team outrushed its Yale counterpart 195 yards to 68 and outpassed it 124 yards to 43. Buell quarterbacked the national champions.

=== 1923 ===
On November 24, the game was played on, according to Grantland Rice, "a gridiron of seventeen lakes, five quagmires and a water hazard" in Boston. Yale won, 13–0. Ducky Pond, future Yale head coach and All American for the season, returned a fumble 67 yards for a touchdown, Yale's first touchdown versus Harvard since World War I.

Yale head coach T.A. Dwight Jones, future member of the College Football Hall of Fame, advised before the opening kickoff, "Gentlemen, you are about to play Harvard. You will never do anything else so important for the rest of your lives." Yale, who defeated Army and then Princeton at the Yale Bowl before crowds of an estimated 80,000 and ended the season scoring 230 points and yielding 38, entered the contest with claim to the national championship. "Memphis" Bill Mallory, Century Milstead and Mal Stevens contributed to the victory. Bill Mallory, team captain and future member of the College Football Hall of Fame, kicked two field goals in the third quarter to complete the scoring.

The Yale athletics department awards a prize commemorating Mallory, who died in a plane crash while serving in the Army Air Forces in World War II, to "the senior man who, on the field of play and in his life at Yale, best represents the highest ideals of American sportsmanship and Yale tradition". The winner is announced at Class Day.

The 1956 Yale Banner, the senior class yearbook, published, "Bill Mallory was, to put it mildly, an all-around football player. He backed the line sharply, ran effectively, kicked field goals with unbelievable skill, and blocked flawlessly. It was his leadership, perhaps, more than any other factor, that brought Yale its last undefeated, untied season." The 1960 Yale football team would duplicate the feat.

=== 1925 ===
On November 21, the game, between a 5–2 Yale team and a 4–3 Harvard team, ended in what the Harvard Crimson hailed as "a scoreless victory". T.A.D. Jones's charges could not decide what play to call on the Harvard one-foot line against Bob Fisher's defense as time ran down in the fourth quarter.

Yale was in "scoring position" six times over the course of the contest, but never crossed the goal line. This game is the last scoreless tie in the series.

=== 1931 ===
The November 21 contest showcased the final gridiron competition between Yale captain Albie Booth and Harvard captain Barry Wood, who lettered three times each in football, ice hockey and baseball.

Harvard was undefeated at 7–0. Yale was 3–1–2. Booth kicked a late fourth quarter field goal, the sole points scored.

=== 1932 ===
The November 19 game was played for 35,000 to 50,000 fans at Yale Bowl, including Babe Ruth, a "loyal Crimson fan" among them, who endured an unreleting rain off Long Island Sound. Walter Levering and Walter Marting scored touchdowns and Yale shut out Harvard 13–0. Walter Marting's son, Walter Marting, Jr., known as Del, would win varsity letters three seasons in the sixties and participate in the rivalry's historic 1968 contest.

=== 1936 ===
On November 21, Yale won, 14–13, at the Bowl. Heisman Trophy winner Larry Kelley captained the squad. Future Heisman trophy winners Clint Frank and Kelley collaborated on a 42-yard pass play, Kelley scoring, to forge a 14–0 halftime lead. Harvard missed an extra point in the fourth quarter and Yale held on for the win. Yale, with a 7–1 record, was ranked 12th in the final AP Poll.

=== 1937 ===
On November 20 Harvard won, 13–6, through snow flurries at the Stadium. The teams rushing attacks totaled 434 yards. Harvard's Torbert Macdonal, who would captain the 1939 Crimson team, gained 102 yards on 10 carries. Yale's Al Hessberg gained 98 yards on 15 carries. Clint Frank scored on a one-yard run in the third quarter.

Yale's second Heisman Trophy winner played with a severe injury most of the contest but made "fifty tackles" according to Stanley Woodward, the sports journalist credited with the first printed mention of the "ivy colleges" or Ivy League, of the New York Herald Tribune. Woodward hailed Frank "the best football player we have seen" since World War I. The Yale team finished 12th in the final AP Poll ranking.

=== 1941 ===
November 22 was Harvard senior Endicott Peabody II's final performance versus Yale. Peabody started three straight seasons on the offensive line. Harvard rushed from scrimmage for 270 yards, Don McNicol accounting for 179 yards and a touchdown on 25 carries.

Harvard shut out Yale, 28–0, in 1940, and shut out Yale, 14–0, in 1941.

Peabody finished sixth in the balloting for the season's Heisman Trophy, and later served a term as governor of Massachusetts.

=== 1949 ===
On November 19, Yale won, 29–6, led by Levi Jackson, its first African-American captain. Jackson was born in Branford, Connecticut, and reared in New Haven, where he was a graduate of Hillhouse High School. Jackson had been a sergeant in the U.S. Army Ordnance Corps during World War II before matriculating at Yale. Jackson scored the day's first and second touchdowns.

1952

On November 22, Yale won, 41–14, at the Stadium. The box score noted Charley Yeager scored Yale's 41st point on a pass reception, from the holder. (Conversions were worth one point, kicked, run, or passed in that era.) Yeager, who stood 5 feet, 5 inches and weighed 145 pounds, was Yale's head football manager. Yeager wore a pristine jersey numbered 99 as he scored on a square-out route, flanked right.

Life, Time, and Saturday Evening Post reported the Walter Mittyesque feat in subsequent issues. At the time, rumblings were heard that Harvard might cease fielding a football team.

=== 1955 ===
The November 19 game was won by Yale, 21–7. Ted Kennedy, in jersey numbered 88, caught a pass for a touchdown in the third quarter for Harvard's sole touchdown in New Haven on a snowy day before a crowd that included his brother, Senator John F. Kennedy, Connecticut's governor Abe Ribicoff, and New York City's mayor Robert F. Wagner, Jr. Denny McGill scored Yale's 20th point on an interception. Offensive tackles Phil Tarasovic, the team captain, and William Post Lovejoy, winner of the Mallory Award for the class of 1956, helped Yale running backs Gene Coker, Al Ward, and Denny McGill gain 238 rushing yards on 45 carries. Harvard, in turn, was held to 78 rushing yards on 33 carries.

Charley Yeager was recalled as fondly as he might be by Harvard denizens of the Dillon Field House. "Remember Charley Yaeger" was chalked prominently in block letters on the Harvard athletics center during the week leading up to Yale's win.

Crimson coach Lloyd Jordan, a future member of the College Football Hall of Fame, was replaced by John Yovicsin in the off season.

=== 1956 ===
On November 24, Denny McGill gained 116 yards on 8 carries and scored on runs of two and seventy-eight yards to stake Yale a 14–0 lead. Play turned unsportsmanlike toward the end of Yale's 42–14 rout, clinching the inaugural Ivy League football title.

The Ivy League athletic conference became fully operational in 1956. Yale won the first Ivy League football title with an undefeated, untied record playing a round-robin schedule versus Harvard, Princeton, Brown, Columbia, Cornell, Dartmouth and Penn.

=== 1957 ===
On November 23, Harvard first year head coach John Yovicsin, recommended by Dick Harlow, brought his team to New Haven with an injured starting quarterback. Yale lead 34–0 by halftime; the Harvard Class of 1947 dispatched a telegram to Yovicsin's counterpart, Jordan Olivar, to "Please" take it easy on the Crimson in the second half. Yale scored 20 points to complete the scoring.

Including this contest, the Crimson would enjoy a 35–24–1 record versus the Bulldogs over the next six decades under three head coaches, Yovicsin, Restic and Murphy. By contrast, the Yale program had six coaches during the period, four during Murphy's career at Harvard.

=== 1960 ===
Mike Pyle, future Chicago Bears center and NFL All-Pro, captained an undefeated, untied Yale team to the 1960 Ivy League football title, 14th place on the AP Poll, and a share of the Lambert Trophy after Yale routed Harvard, 39–6, on November 19. Pyle, who would captain the 1963 NFL Championship–winning Bears, lead the last untied and undefeated Yale team since 1923.

Yale's first play from scrimmage netted a 41-yard touchdown run by Ken Wolfe. Harvard quarterback Charlie Ravenal turned over a pitchout that John Hutcherson returned 42 yards for a touchdown early in the afternoon. Harvard scored with Yale leading, 39–0.

=== 1963 ===
The game played November 30, which Yale won, 20–6, was postponed from November 23 in mourning for assassinated president of the United States John F. Kennedy, Harvard College Class of 1940 and Yale University 1962 honorand and commencement speaker. Arrangements had been made during the week by the Secret Service for Kennedy to attend the contest at Yale after the trip to Dallas. Kennedy had earned a JV football letter at Harvard. Chuck Mercein lead all running backs with 63 total rushing yards and made two of three PATs.

=== 1967 and 1968 ===
"The games played in 1967 and 1968 were a pair of back-to-back thrillers unique in the chronicles. Both were filled with action, great individual efforts, and costly misplays, each terminating in breathtaking climaxes ... each had the outline of high melodrama", Tom Bergin wrote the above in his definitive The Game: The Harvard-Yale Football Rivalry, 1875–1983.

Yale won, 24–20, on a soggy playing surface under clearing skies on November 25, 1967, at the Yale Bowl. A crowd of 68,315, understood as the largest crowd to attend a football game in the Ivy League era, was present.

Yale scored first on a recovery in the endzone. Offensive end Del Marting scored. The second score, off a lengthy improvisational quarterback scramble by Dowling, was a 53-yard pass completion to Calvin Hill. Hill remarked to Dan Jenkins, reporting for Sports Illustrated, "We do that a lot. It's kind of a play. Dowling gets in trouble and I wave my hand and he throws it to me." A fieldgoal was the 17th point. Then, Harvard scored three touchdowns, one each in the second, third and fourth quarters. Harvard, led by left handed quarterback Ric Zimmerman, Vic Gatto (next year's captain) and Ray Hornblower, overcame a seventeen-point Yale lead to score twenty unanswered points. Then, late in the fourth quarter Dowling delivered deftly a 66-yard pass to Del Marting for the winning touchdown. Yale claimed the victory soon after Ken O'Connell fumbled on Harvard's next series.

The game played November 23, 1968, was highlighted by the Crimson scoring 16 points in the final 42 seconds to tie a highly touted Bulldog squad. Harvard All Ivy punter and Harvard Varsity Club Hall of Fame member Gary Singleterry has recalled that the 1968 game and season was a triumph of the human spirit for Harvard football.

Harvard head coach John Yovicsin substituted twice quarterback Frank Champi—number 27, the man of the moment who earned one varsity H at Harvard—for George Lalich to reignite the Crimson's nearly-extinguished offense. Champi singed the Yale defense at the close of the first half with a touchdown drive (however, Yovicsin returned Champi to the bench at the start of the second half), then Champi, again substituting for the lackluster Lalich, immolated the Yale defense in the closing minutes of the contest. Yale lost six fumbles, an all-time record, adding logs to the fire.

Poor officiating and poor timekeeping contributed to the outcome, Yale partisans and players have suggested; nonetheless, Pete Varney, who would later play in the MLB, ran a slant route and caught a pass right in front of Yale linebacker Ed Franklin, giving Harvard its 29th point.

Yale had a 16-game winning streak. Both teams were 8–0. For the first time since 1909, both adversaries were undefeated and untied for the contest. Yale was ranked at the lower end of a few top national college football polls. Calvin Hill, soon to be the first ever and only Ivy League football athlete selected in the first round of the NFL draft, and future actor Tommy Lee Jones, an offensive guard for Harvard, were in uniform.

The Penn Quakers finished third in the standings and won five League games by close scores but were defeated by Harvard, 28–6, and Yale, 30–13. By contrast, Yale had defeated, in order, excluding the Penn game—which was Yale's fifth win in the League—Brown, 35–15, Columbia, 29–7, Cornell 25–13, Dartmouth, 47–27, and Princeton, 42–17.

The Yale roster included two future Rhodes Scholars, Kurt Schmoke and Tom Neville, who would later captain a Yale football squad. The Harvard roster included one future Rhodes Scholar, Paul Saba.

The outcome inspired The Harvard Crimson to print the logically impossible "Harvard Beats Yale, 29–29" headline. This headline was later used as the title for a 2008 documentary about this Game, directed by Kevin Rafferty.

Yale Daily News editors headlined "Johns Stage Dramatic Rally Tie Elis For Title, 29 – All" at top right half of frontpage of its November 25, 1968, issue.

John T. Downey, a Yale football letterwinner before joining the CIA, was a prisoner-of-war in 1968. His Chinese captors allowed correspondences from home while he endured solitary confinement. Downey received from a friend a postcard announcing Yale had won, 29–13. Months later he learned of the "loss".

=== 1969 ===
On November 22, Yale outlasted Harvard, 7–0, and shared the League football title with Dartmouth and Princeton. Each team suffered one loss.

Future NFL defensive back and coach Don Martin and Bill Primps, who scored the sole touchdown, combined for 162 rushing yards. Captain Andy Coe lead the defense to the shutout. Harvard's offense help preserve the shutout. The unit advanced to the Yale ten yard line in the last few minutes of the fourth quarter but missed anticlimactically a 32-yard field goal attempt moments before game time expired.

=== 1972 ===
In Boston on November 25, Yale overcame a 17–0 Harvard second quarter lead with 28 unanswered points. Yale won, 28–17.

Dick Jauron, who rushed for 183 yards, setting the all-time record in the series, and captain Dick Perschel, at linebacker, lead the Bulldogs to the come-from-behind victory. Harvard's Ted DeMars rushed for 153 yards, including an 86-yard first quarter touchdown.

Harvard was held scoreless after quarterback Eric Crone's one-yard touchdown run and the successful conversion kick. Momentum swung away from Harvard after fumbling on its one-yard line later in the quarter. Tyrell Henning scored eventually for Yale.

Momentum swung seemingly further toward Yale when a Harvard punt was blocked on the subsequent set of downs; however, Jauron was stopped at the 1-yard line before halftime. Jauron scored on a seventy-four run early in the third quarter.

Jauron, among a myriad of awards, won the Gridiron Club of Greater Boston George H. "Bulger" Lowe award for the season.

=== 1974 ===
On November 22, Harvard Stadium was the setting for a late fourth quarter 95-yard drive that defeated an undefeated and untied Yale team. Senior quarterback, first year starter and eventual All Ivy First Team football selection Milt Holt lead the Harvard offense to the winning touchdown through a Yale defense that lead the League in many statistical categories. Holt scored on a sweep around left end for Harvard's 20th point. The Crimson won, 21–16. Harvard and Yale both finished the season 6–1 in the League and shared the title.

Gary Fencik caught 11 passes for 187 yards in the losing effort. Fencik was one of a total of six varsity letterwinners on the field—with Yale teammates Elvin Charity and Vic Staffieri (whom Carm Cozza described as "the best captain I ever had" when Staffieri lead the 1976 Bulldogs team), and Bill Emper, Dan Jiggetts, and Pat McInally for Harvard—who were named later to the Ivy League Silver Anniversary team. Greg Dubinetz, a Yale senior lineman, was drafted by the Cincinnati Bengals in the ninth round of the 1975 NFL draft and enjoyed a brief professional football career.

=== 1975 ===
The game played November 22 in New Haven—the outcome elevating Harvard to its first undisputed League football championship (it had shared titles three other seasons since 1956, the League's first year) – featured future Chicago Bears teammates Harvard captain Dan Jiggetts and Yale captain Gary Fencik. Fencik helped win Super Bowl XX and a Gold Record with the Bears.

Harvard won, 10–7, on a fourth quarter field goal by Mike Lynch with 0:33 on the official time clock.

=== 1978 ===
Future three-time Super Bowl champion Kenny Hill ran well from the I formation, 154 yards on 25 carries, and scored down a sideline on an 18-yard pitchout, and Yale won, 35–28, in Boston on November 18. Larry Brown, Harvard's senior quarterback, set a Harvard standard for touchdown passes in The Game. Neil Rose, Ryan Fitzpatrick, a future NFL starting quarterback, and Chris Pizzotti would each toss four touchdowns versus Yale in 2001, 2003, and 2007, respectively, matching Brown.

Brown would teach a seminar at Harvard on the multiflex the next academic semester.

The most memorable pass of the afternoon was tossed by a future participant in the NFL. Tight end John Spagnola, a future eleven year NFL veteran and participant in Super Bowl XV, lofted a spiral to fellow receiver Bob Krystyniak for a touchdown to conclude a trick play. The extra point provided the 21-point cushion Brown almost wore out with two more touchdown passes.

Carm Cozza fielded questions on the 1968 contest for a portion of his post-game interview.

=== 1979 ===
On November 17, Harvard upset, 22–7, an undefeated, untied, 13.5 point Las Vegas-favored Yale team in New Haven before an estimated crowd of 72,000. The Crimson was shocked by the outcome, publishing the following week a sports column under the headline "The Shock of 1979". Yale had clinched the League title the week before with a 35–10 victory over Princeton at Palmer Stadium. Not even the Harvard Crimson sports editor, or a peer at any of the other seven League newspapers, predicted Harvard would win.

Harvard running back Jim Callinan and the offense set the tone with an opening game drive of 74 yards, 64 by the run, on 17 plays. Callinan caught a 23-yard touchdown pass later in the afternoon. Harvard ran for 152 yards from scrimmage while Yale managed 92 yards. Yale fumbled six times but recovered three, unlike the 1968 Yale team that fumbled six times with Harvard recovering each fumble.

Harvard lost its starting and backup quarterback before the season started. Injuries forced four other quarterbacks onto the field with hope each had mastered Joe Restic's complicated multiflex offense. Brian Buckley, Ron Cuccia, Mike Smerczynski, Joe Lahti, Mike Buchannan, and Burke St. John—who quarterbacked the 22 – 7 victory—were each listed at least once as the Crimson's starting quarterback during the season. Harvard employed two tightends and an unbalanced offensive line to control the line scrimmage.

Harvard finished the season 3 – 6 and thwarted again a Yale team a win away from an unblemished football season. Yale would have celebrated its first undefeated, untied season since 1960 and its second in 56 years with a win. Yale clinched sole possession of the League football title the week before at Princeton.

=== 1983 ===
The game played on November 19 marked the 100th time the programs met on the gridiron. Harvard won, 16–7, in New Haven. Captain, linebacker and later Bingham Award winner Joe Azelby led the Crimson. Harvard outrushed Yale 259 yards to 61. Yale endured its worst season of all time, finishing 1–9.

Tragedy struck during the ensuing post-game on-field celebration when a Harvard student was struck by a toppled goal post.

Yale led the series 54–38–8.

=== 1987 ===
On November 21, the weather conditions at the Bowl were somewhat similar to the 1967 NFL Championship Game in Green Bay, Wisconsin. Game time temperature approached the high teens and 40 mph wind chilled the "real feel" temperatures to sub-zero Fahrenheit throughout the day. Harvard won, 14–10, before an announced crowd of 66,548.

Joe Restic guided the Crimson 8–2 overall and 6–1 League records, both bests for Restic. Harvard won the League football title.

=== 1993 ===
On November 20, a gameball was presented to Theo Epstein, a Yale Daily News sports section editor. Epstein, later a noted sports executive, authored a column calling for Yale head coach Carm Cozza to retire, published the day before the 110th contest in the series. The column appeared to arouse the Bulldogs.

Harvard, the program playing its last game under Joe Restic, appeared aroused, too. The 33–31 outcome was the highest combined score to date in the series. Both teams had each won one game, and not versus Princeton, in the League entering the contest. The teams both finished with 3–7 overall records.

Twenty five years before, almost to date, Harvard achieved a climatic 29–29 win versus Yale. The New York Times sportswriter William N. Wallace wrote "Twenty-five years ago Harvard scored 26 points in the last 42 seconds at Cambridge to tie Yale, 29–29, in an epic battle between two undefeated teams." (Wallace authored an authoritative book on an important game in the Princeton–Yale football rivalry, Yale's Ironmen: A Story of Football + Lives in the Decade of the Depression + Beyond.) Harvard mounted a fourth quarter comeback, and though it mauled the Yale return man and caused a melee on an onside kick after scoring on a 77-yard pass and a run play for the 2-point coconversion, the Crimson couldn't send off Restic with a victory.

=== 1995 ===
On November 18 in New Haven, Harvard, 1–6 in the League, defeated Yale, 22–21. Coach Murphy's charges would soon dominate the series. Murphy scored an astounding 17–6 versus four Yale counterparts, including Carm Cozza.

=== 1999 ===
On November 20, quarterback Eric Walland and receiver Eric Johnson set single game Yale records for passing yardage, passing attempts and completions, 437 yards on 42 completions from 67 attempts, and receiving yardage and receptions, 244 yards and 21 receptions. Yale won the contest on a touchdown pass to Johnson from Walland with 0:29 remaining in the game.

Yale won the year before and the year after.

=== 2001 ===
On November 17, Harvard defeated Yale, 35–23, in New Haven. The win sealed the Crimson's first perfect season since 1913. Percy Haughton had last lead Harvard to undefeated and untied seasons, 9–0, in 1912 and 1913. Yale's three-game win streak in the series ended. Neil Rose completed four touchdown passes.

=== 2004 ===
On November 20, the Harvard team, a team that eight times scored at least 30 points against an opponent during the season, completed the program's third undefeated season with a 35–3 victory versus Yale. Future NFL quarterback and Buffalo Bills captain Ryan Fitzpatrick, who captained the Harvard team, earned the season's Frederick Greeley Crocker award as team MVP and the Asa Bushnell Cup as League Player of the Year. Fifteen Harvard athletes were named to the All-Ivy squad. The undefeated season was Tim Murphy's second in four seasons.

Yale undergraduate pranksters, led by Michael Kai and David Aulicino, won handily, too. The 2004 Harvard–Yale prank gained national press coverage through the early part of the week following the contest. Jimmy Kimmel Live!, among other news, sports and entertainment media, gave notice that Harvard fans raised cards in unison that read "WE SUCK". Yale fans applauded appreciatively in acknowledgement from the other side of Soldiers Field.

=== 2005 ===
Clifton Dawson's 258th carry for the season, a record, delivered to Harvard the triple-overtime victory, 30–24, on November 19 in New Haven. The contest was the longest ever at the Bowl and in Ivy League football history. Yale led, 21–3, in the third quarter.

Dawson is the Crimsom leader in career rushing attempts (958), career rushing yards (4,241), single-season rushing yards (1,302), career rushing touchdowns (60), and single-season rushing touchdowns (20).

=== 2009 ===
On November 21, Harvard won 14–10. The contest concluded horribly for Yale head coach Tom Williams.

Yale nursed a 10–0 halftime lead to a 10–7 lead late in the fourth quarter. Then Williams, on fourth down and 22 yards to go for a first down from the Yale 26, chose to fake a punt. The attempt netted fifteen yards.

Harvard was behind 10–0 late in the fourth quarter. Harvard scored its first touchdown covering 76 yards in six plays. When Yale's fake punt failed Collier Winter soon passed to Chris Lorditch for the winning touchdown. Moments later Harvard linebacker Jon Takamura intercepted a pass to end the game. Williams was soon released from his contract for presenting misleading information about being a candidate for a Rhodes Scholarship.

=== 2014 ===
Conner Hempel completed a 35-yard touchdown pass to Andrew Fischer with 0:55 remaining in the contest and Harvard defeated Yale 31–24. Harvard won outright the League football title on November 22. A Yale victory would have created a three-way tie for the League football title among Dartmouth, Harvard and Yale. Harvard led 24–7 at the end of the third quarter. Harvard finished season ranked in several Top 20 college football polls for its NCAA division.

The Emmy-winning ESPN College GameDay was broadcast from Boston. Lee Corso predicted Yale would win on the premiere college football television show. A little more than a week before the contest, Yale students protested the cost of the football program, particularly given the recent poor record.

Tyler Varga gained 127 yards on 30 carries and scored two touchdowns for Yale but Harvard completed the season undefeated and untied, the third time during Tim Murphy's tenure.

Deon Randall for Yale and Norm Hayes for Harvard captained the teams, the first time African American athletes represented each rival at the opening coin toss. Both were voted First team All-Ivy football, Randall at receiver (for the second straight year) and Hayes at defensive back. Tim Murphy was voted Coach of the Year.

=== 2015 ===
The football game held November 21 was the first that ended after sunset at the Bowl, and was won by Harvard, 38–19. The 2:30 kickoff forced play after dusk. Harvard extended to nine games its winning streak versus Yale, the longest winning streak in the series. Harvard shared the League title, the third straight season it shared or won outright the title, another school record.

Justice Shelton-Mosley gained 119 yards, scoring two touchdowns, on five receptions, and scored on an eight-yard run from scrimmage. The first touchdown reception covered fifty-three yards, the second covered thirty-five yards. The fourth quarter eight-yard touchdown run ended his day. Shelton-Mosley was named Ivy League Rookie of the Year.

=== 2016 ===
The game played November 19 in Boston ended two streaks. Yale won, 21–14, denying Harvard its fourth consecutive shared or outright Ivy League football title, and ending Yale's nine-game losing streak in The Game.

=== 2019 ===
Like many previous iterations of The Game, the regular season finale between Yale and Harvard had Ivy League Championship implications. Yale and Dartmouth began the day tied for the Ivy League lead, at 5–1 in conference play. Yale was ranked 25th in the national FCS coaches poll entering the game after defeating 19th ranked Princeton a week before. The first half of the 136th edition of The Game surprised odds makers with a 15-3 Harvard lead.

Halftime began at 1:40 PM, but the start of the third quarter was delayed when a small group of protesters staged a sit-in at midfield and were soon joined by more than 500 spectators, including students and alumni from Harvard and Yale. Among the causes being protested, the media coverage focused most on the calls for the two universities to divest from fossil fuel holdings and Puerto Rican debt. Play resumed just over an hour later after security escorted out the 42 individuals who refused to leave.

For most of the second half, the Crimson had a commanding lead over the Bulldogs, including 19- and 17-point leads in the fourth quarter. With 90 seconds left in the game, a successful onside kick aided Yale in scoring two touchdowns to force overtime. Both teams scored touchdowns on their first overtime possessions. The Bulldogs started with the ball in the second overtime and quickly scored a touchdown. On the ensuing Harvard possession the Bulldogs forced the Crimson to go four and out, ending the two-overtime struggle. The 50–43 score handed Yale a share of the Ivy League Championship, their second title in three years.

The conclusion was threatened by the early sunset and the lack of lights in the 105-year-old stadium. The second half began at 2:48 PM, the sunset occurred at 4:26 PM, and the deciding Yale stop took place at 4:38 PM. The thriller game itself, along with its importance in the Ivy League standings as well as the unexpected sit-in, led observers to immediately declare it a classic, with the New Haven Register, a popular local newspaper, stating that the game, "instantly took on legendary status in the annals of one of college football's most prestigious rivalries".

Notably, Harvard running back Aidan Borguet delivered an outstanding performance, totaling 269 rushing yards and 4 touchdowns on 11 carries. He averaged 24.5 yards per carry.

=== 2023 ===
In the last year of Harvard Head Coach Tim Murphy's successful coaching career in Cambridge, Harvard came into The Game favored to win and needing the victory over Yale to claim the Ivy League Championship outright. Harvard trailed throughout but mounted a fourth-quarter comeback with two touchdowns to take the lead, only to see Yale respond when a costly Jaden Craig fumble deep in Harvard territory gave Yale the ball. Yale quarterback Nolan Grooms converted with a 12-yard touchdown pass to receiver David Pantelis to give Yale a lead it would never relinquish with six minutes left in the contest. Yale's 23–18 win gave the Bulldogs a share of the Ivy title with Harvard and Dartmouth.

=== 2025 ===
The 2025 edition of the Game (the 141st played) featured a then-undefeated Harvard facing Yale (with one conference loss) in a game in which a Harvard win would give the Crimson an undefeated regular season, sole possession of the Ivy League title, and the first-ever automatic Ivy League bid to the NCAA FCS post-season playoffs.

Harvard achieved none of the goals.

Yale won its fourth consecutive contest in the rivalry.

Yale's upset win gave the Bulldogs a share of the Ivy title and the automatic NCAA bid by virtue of the head-to-head victory; however, Harvard did accept an at-large bid to the tournament.

Yale scored a touchdown just 18 seconds into the contest, led by 17 at the half, and never trailed en route to a dominant 45–28 victory in a contest that Harvard's undergraduate newspaper, the Harvard Crimson, described as "a humiliating defeat" for Harvard. Yale quarterback Dante Reno, son of Yale Head Coach Tony Reno, completed 15 of 19 passes for 273 yards and three touchdowns and no interceptions in his first year as the signal-caller in The Game, with senior teammate Nico Brown leading the way for the Yale receiving corps with 8 receptions totalling almost 200 yards and a touchdown. All-Ivy running back Josh Pitsenberger rushed for 143 yards and three touchdowns, capping a 4-0 playing career in The Game in which, in the aggregate in four contests against the Harvard defense, he rushed for 444 yards and scored five touchdowns.

The total 73 points scored was the second-most scored in the series.

Yale earned the Ivy League's first automatic berth to the NCAA Football (FCS) post-season playoff. Yale defeated host Youngstown State 43–42 in the NCAA Football (FCS) post-season playoff game. Yale outscored the host 36–7 in the second half after trailing 35–7 at halftime; by contrast, Harvard, yielding points in each of the four quarters, was humbled by Villanova, 52–7, in the other NCAA Football (FCS) post-season game with an Ivy League participant.

== Record ==
The football teams of Harvard and Yale have been meeting nearly annually since their first game on November 13, 1875. Following is a table of dates, scores and venues of Harvard–Yale games. All games were played on Saturdays except those in 1883 and 1887 when the game was played on Thursday, Thanksgiving Day. Since 1945 the game has been played in New Haven, Connecticut in odd years and in Boston, Massachusetts in even years. As of November 2025, 140 games have been played. Yale has 71 wins and Harvard has 61 wins (8 games ended as ties). Harvard has the longest winning streak (nine games).

=== Results ===
Harvard victories are shown in ██ crimson, Yale victories in ██ blue, and tie games in ██ light gray. The - symbol denotes a skipped year.

Game	Date	Winning team	Score	Venue	Notes
1	November 13, 1875	Harvard	4g,2t–0	Hamilton Park, New Haven	Until 1883, goals from a kick ("g") and touchdowns ("t") were tracked separately, and in 1875 and 1876, touchdowns did not count for a score.
2	November 18, 1876	Yale	1g–2t	Hamilton Park, New Haven	
	—				
3	November 23, 1878	Yale	1g–0	South End Grounds, Boston	Between 1877 and 1882, a touchdown counted for 1/4 of a goal.
4	November 8, 1879	Tie	0–0	Hamilton Park, New Haven	
5	November 20, 1880	Yale	1g,1t–0	South End Grounds, Boston	Between 1877 and 1882, a touchdown counted for 1/4 of a goal.
6	November 12, 1881	Yale	0–4s	Hamilton Park, New Haven	Yale was awarded victory on safeties, as, in a tie, the team having 4 or more safeties than the other would lose.
7	November 25, 1882	Yale	1g,3t-0	Holmes Field, Cambridge	Between 1877 and 1882, a touchdown counted for 1/4 of a goal.
8	November 29, 1883	Yale	23–2	Polo Grounds, New York	Match was played on Thursday, Thanksgiving Day
9	November 22, 1884	Yale	52–0	Yale Field, New Haven	
	—				Harvard banned football in 1885
10	November 20, 1886	Yale	29–4	Jarvis Field, Cambridge	
11	November 24, 1887	Yale	17–8	Polo Grounds, New York	Match was played on Thursday, Thanksgiving Day
	—				
12	November 23, 1889	Yale	6–0	Hampden Park, Springfield, Massachusetts	
13	November 22, 1890	Harvard	12–6	Hampden Park, Springfield, Massachusetts	
14	November 21, 1891	Yale	10–0	Hampden Park, Springfield, Massachusetts	
15	November 19, 1892	Yale	6–0	Hampden Park, Springfield, Massachusetts	Harvard introduced flying wedge formation
16	November 25, 1893	Yale	6–0	Hampden Park, Springfield, Massachusetts	The New York Times game preview and lineups
17	November 24, 1894	Yale	12–4	Hampden Park, Springfield, Massachusetts	
	—				The 1894 game was so violent that the series was suspended for two years
	—				
18	November 13, 1897	Tie	0–0	Soldiers Field, Cambridge	
19	November 19, 1898	Harvard	17–0	Yale Field, New Haven	
20	November 18, 1899	Tie	0–0	Soldiers Field, Cambridge	
21	November 24, 1900	Yale	28–0	Yale Field, New Haven	
22	November 23, 1901	Harvard	22–0	Soldiers Field, Cambridge	
23	November 22, 1902	Yale	23–0	Yale Field, New Haven	Crowd of 30,000 saw contest.
24	November 21, 1903	Yale	16–0	Harvard Stadium, Boston	
25	November 19, 1904	Yale	12–0	Yale Field, New Haven	
26	November 25, 1905	Yale	6–0	Harvard Stadium, Boston	
27	November 24, 1906	Yale	6–0	Yale Field, New Haven	
28	November 23, 1907	Yale	12–0	Harvard Stadium, Boston	
29	November 21, 1908	Harvard	4–0	Yale Field, New Haven	HOF Harvard Coach Percy Haughton allegedly strangled a live bulldog and threw its dead carcass at players in the locker room before the game to motivate his players to victory. However, according to research published by the Los Angeles Times in 2011, it is likely that this story is a myth. According to the research, it is much more probable that the coach strangled a fake bulldog made of papier-mâché.
30	November 20, 1909	Yale	8–0	Harvard Stadium, Boston	
31	November 19, 1910	Tie	0–0	Yale Field, New Haven	
32	November 25, 1911	Tie	0–0	Harvard Stadium, Boston	
33	November 23, 1912	Harvard	20–0	Yale Field, New Haven	
34	November 22, 1913	Harvard	15–5	Harvard Stadium, Boston	Electrical World article on The Game
35	November 21, 1914	Harvard	15–5	Yale Bowl, New Haven	Image of The Game
36	November 20, 1915	Harvard	41–0	Harvard Stadium, Boston	
37	November 25, 1916	Yale	3–6	Yale Bowl, New Haven	
	—				Both Harvard and Yale suspended their football programs during World War I.
	—				Both Harvard and Yale suspended their football programs during World War I.
38	November 22, 1919	Harvard	10–3	Harvard Stadium, Boston	
39	November 20, 1920	Harvard	9–0	Yale Bowl, New Haven	80,000 fans attended
40	November 19, 1921	Harvard	10–3	Harvard Stadium, Boston	
41	November 25, 1922	Harvard	10–3	Yale Bowl, New Haven	
42	November 24, 1923	Yale	13–0	Harvard Stadium, Boston	
43	November 22, 1924	Yale	19–6	Yale Bowl, New Haven	
44	November 21, 1925	Tie	0–0	Harvard Stadium, Boston	
45	November 20, 1926	Yale	12–7	Yale Bowl, New Haven	
46	November 19, 1927	Yale	14–0	Harvard Stadium, Boston	
47	November 24, 1928	Harvard	17–0	Yale Bowl, New Haven	
48	November 23, 1929	Harvard	10–6	Harvard Stadium, Boston	
49	November 22, 1930	Harvard	13–0	Yale Bowl, New Haven	
50	November 21, 1931	Yale	3–0	Harvard Stadium, Boston	
51	November 19, 1932	Yale	19–0	Yale Bowl, New Haven	Time article on The Game
52	November 25, 1933	Harvard	19–6	Harvard Stadium, Boston	
53	November 24, 1934	Yale	14–0	Yale Bowl, New Haven	
54	November 23, 1935	Yale	14–7	Harvard Stadium, Boston	In 1935 Gerald Ford was an assistant coach for Yale
55	November 21, 1936	Yale	14–13	Yale Bowl, New Haven	Game featured 1936 Heisman winner Larry Kelley
56	November 20, 1937	Harvard	13–6	Harvard Stadium, Boston	Game featured 1937 Heisman winner Clint Frank
57	November 19, 1938	Harvard	7–0	Yale Bowl, New Haven	
58	November 25, 1939	Yale	20–7	Harvard Stadium, Boston	
59	November 23, 1940	Harvard	28–0	Yale Bowl, New Haven	
60	November 22, 1941	Harvard	14–0	Harvard Stadium, Boston	
61	November 21, 1942	Yale	7–3	Yale Bowl, New Haven	
	—				While Yale continued its football program during World War II, Harvard suspended theirs and played no games in 1943 and 1944.
	—				While Yale continued its football program during World War II, Harvard suspended theirs and played no games in 1943 and 1944.
62	December 1, 1945	Yale	28–0	Yale Bowl, New Haven	Harvard did not restart its football program until shortly after VJ-Day, after Yale had already closed its 1945 schedule. It was agreed that Yale would add Harvard at the end of its schedule on December 1 (the only time the two teams played a December game) - with the location being at the Yale Bowl - reversing the tradition in place since 1897 that games in odd years would be played at Harvard's field, while games in even years would be played at Yale. Since the 1945 game, games in odd years would be played at the Yale Bowl and games in even years would be played at Harvard Stadium.
63	November 23, 1946	Yale	27–14	Harvard Stadium, Boston	
64	November 22, 1947	Yale	31–21	Yale Bowl, New Haven	
65	November 20, 1948	Harvard	20–7	Harvard Stadium, Boston	
66	November 19, 1949	Yale	29–6	Yale Bowl, New Haven	Game featured Yale captain Levi Jackson
67	November 25, 1950	Yale	14–6	Harvard Stadium, Boston	
68	November 24, 1951	Tie	21–21	Yale Bowl, New Haven	
69	November 22, 1952	Yale	41–14	Harvard Stadium, Boston	
70	November 21, 1953	Harvard	13–0	Yale Bowl, New Haven	
71	November 20, 1954	Harvard	13–9	Harvard Stadium, Boston	
72	November 19, 1955	Yale	21–7	Yale Bowl, New Haven	End Ted Kennedy scored Harvard's only touchdown. Down 14–0 in the third quarter, he caught an eight-yard pass from Walt Stahura to complete a 79-yard drive.
73	November 24, 1956	Yale	42–14	Harvard Stadium, Boston	
74	November 23, 1957	Yale	54–0	Yale Bowl, New Haven	
75	November 22, 1958	Harvard	28–0	Harvard Stadium, Boston	
76	November 21, 1959	Harvard	35–6	Yale Bowl, New Haven	
77	November 19, 1960	Yale	39–6	Harvard Stadium, Boston	
78	November 25, 1961	Harvard	27–0	Yale Bowl, New Haven	
79	November 24, 1962	Harvard	14–6	Harvard Stadium, Boston	
80	November 30, 1963	Yale	20–6	Yale Bowl, New Haven	Tim Merrill, native of Cambridge, Ohio intercepted a pass that made it possible for Yale's go-ahead score. Game delayed a week after the death of President John F. Kennedy, Harvard 1940.
81	November 21, 1964	Harvard	18–14	Harvard Stadium, Boston	
82	November 20, 1965	Harvard	13–0	Yale Bowl, New Haven	
83	November 19, 1966	Harvard	17–0	Harvard Stadium, Boston	
84	November 25, 1967	Yale	24–20	Yale Bowl, New Haven	
85	November 23, 1968	Tie	29–29	Harvard Stadium, Boston	The Harvard Student Newspaper printed the title Harvard Beats Yale 29-29, which became the title of a famous 2008 documentary film. This was the final tie in the rivalry, as modern college football rules do not allow tie games.
86	November 22, 1969	Yale	7–0	Yale Bowl, New Haven	
87	November 21, 1970	Harvard	14–12	Harvard Stadium, Boston	
88	November 20, 1971	Harvard	35–16	Yale Bowl, New Haven	
89	November 25, 1972	Yale	28–17	Harvard Stadium, Boston	
90	November 24, 1973	Yale	35–0	Yale Bowl, New Haven	
91	November 23, 1974	Harvard	21–16	Harvard Stadium, Boston	
92	November 22, 1975	Harvard	10–7	Yale Bowl, New Haven	
93	November 13, 1976	Yale	21–7	Harvard Stadium, Boston	
94	November 12, 1977	Yale	24–7	Yale Bowl, New Haven	
95	November 18, 1978	Yale	35–28	Harvard Stadium, Boston	
96	November 17, 1979	Harvard	22–7	Yale Bowl, New Haven	
97	November 22, 1980	Yale	14–0	Harvard Stadium, Boston	
98	November 21, 1981	Yale	28–0	Yale Bowl, New Haven	
99	November 20, 1982	Harvard	45-7	Harvard Stadium, Boston	Harvard and Yale moved to NCAA Division I-AA; MIT pulled the famous weather balloon prank.
100	November 19, 1983	Harvard	16–7	Yale Bowl, New Haven	
101	November 17, 1984	Yale	30–27	Harvard Stadium, Boston	
102	November 23, 1985	Yale	17–6	Yale Bowl, New Haven	
103	November 22, 1986	Harvard	24–17	Harvard Stadium, Boston	
104	November 21, 1987	Harvard	14–10	Yale Bowl, New Haven	
105	November 19, 1988	Yale	26–17	Harvard Stadium, Boston	
106	November 18, 1989	Harvard	37–20	Yale Bowl, New Haven	
107	November 17, 1990	Yale	34–19	Harvard Stadium, Boston	MIT fired a rocket with an MIT banner over the goal post.
108	November 23, 1991	Yale	23–13	Yale Bowl, New Haven	
109	November 21, 1992	Harvard	14–0	Harvard Stadium, Boston	
110	November 20, 1993	Yale	33–31	Yale Bowl, New Haven	
111	November 19, 1994	Yale	32–13	Harvard Stadium, Boston	
112	November 18, 1995	Harvard	22–21	Yale Bowl, New Haven	
113	November 23, 1996	Harvard	26–21	Harvard Stadium, Boston	
114	November 22, 1997	Harvard	17–7	Yale Bowl, New Haven	
115	November 21, 1998	Yale	9–7	Harvard Stadium, Boston	
116	November 20, 1999	Yale	24–21	Yale Bowl, New Haven	
117	November 18, 2000	Yale	34–24	Harvard Stadium, Boston	
118	November 17, 2001	Harvard	35–23	Yale Bowl, New Haven	
119	November 23, 2002	Harvard	20–13	Harvard Stadium, Boston	Images from The Game
120	November 22, 2003	Harvard	37–19	Yale Bowl, New Haven	53,136 fans attended.
121	November 20, 2004	Harvard	35–3	Harvard Stadium, Boston	Recap. Yale pulled a high-profile prank.
122	November 19, 2005	Harvard	30–24 (3OT)	Yale Bowl, New Haven	
123	November 18, 2006	Yale	34–13	Harvard Stadium, Boston	
124	November 17, 2007	Harvard	37–6	Yale Bowl, New Haven	
125	November 22, 2008	Harvard	10–0	Harvard Stadium, Boston	
126	November 21, 2009	Harvard	14–10	Yale Bowl, New Haven	
127	November 20, 2010	Harvard	28–21	Harvard Stadium, Boston	
128	November 19, 2011	Harvard	45–7	Yale Bowl, New Haven	
129	November 17, 2012	Harvard	34–24	Harvard Stadium, Boston	
130	November 23, 2013	Harvard	34–7	Yale Bowl, New Haven	
131	November 22, 2014	Harvard	31–24	Harvard Stadium, Boston	Harvard hosted ESPN's College Gameday.
132	November 21, 2015	Harvard	38–19	Yale Bowl, New Haven	
133	November 19, 2016	Yale	21–14	Harvard Stadium, Boston	
134	November 18, 2017	Yale	24–3	Yale Bowl, New Haven	
135	November 17, 2018	Harvard	45–27	Fenway Park (Harvard Home), Boston	
136	November 23, 2019	Yale	50–43 (2OT)	Yale Bowl, New Haven	Yale scored 14 points within the final 90 seconds of regulation to tie the game, then won in double overtime. Second half delayed by 45 minutes due to joint protest by Fossil Free Yale and Divest Harvard, demanding both universities divest from fossil fuels.
	November 2020			Scheduled for Harvard Stadium, Boston	Canceled due to the COVID-19 pandemic.
137	November 20, 2021	Harvard	34–31	Yale Bowl, New Haven	
138	November 19, 2022	Yale	19–14	Harvard Stadium, Boston	
139	November 18, 2023	Yale	23–18	Yale Bowl, New Haven	Over 51,000 fans attended. Harvard's loss in Head Coach Tim Murphy's last year denied it the sole Ivy title; Yale's win gave it a share of the Ivy league title (with Dartmouth and Harvard).
140	November 23, 2024	Yale	34–29	Harvard Stadium, Boston	Harvard's loss in Head Coach Andrew Aurich's first Harvard-Yale game cost it sole possession of the Ivy title.
141	November 22, 2025	Yale	45–28	Yale Bowl, New Haven	Yale's clinches share of Ivy League Championship and automatic bid to the FCS playoff; Harvard's loss spoiled perfect regular season and cost Harvard sole possession of the Ivy title and the NCAA automatic bid.

== Past participants and teams ==
Some past participants and teams have been noteworthy. Yale claims twenty seven collegiate national football season-ending number one poll rankings or championships. Harvard football claims seven such rankings or championships.

Yale or Harvard athletes, cheerleaders, coaches, journalists, and student managers associated with The Game include: Howard M. Baldrige, George W. Bush, Jonathan Bush, Prescott Bush, Ruly Carpenter, Frederick B. Dent, Richardson Dilworth, John T. Downey, Theo Epstein, Gerald Ford, Jack Ford, Pudge Heffelfinger, John Hersey, Charles B. Johnson, Dean Loucks, Archibald MacLeish, Michael McCaskey, Lee McClung, Vance McCormick, Stone Phillips, Philip W. Pillsbury, William Proxmire, Frederic Remington, Percy Avery Rockefeller, Kurt Schmoke, Bob Shoop, Steve Skrovan, Amos Alonzo Stagg, George Woodruff and William Wrigley III for Yale; and Steve Ballmer, Wilder Dwight Bancroft, Edward Bowditch, Frank Champi, Henry Chauncey, Adam Clymer, John Culver, Arthur Cumnock, C. Douglas Dillon, Hamilton Fish III, Tim Fleiszer, Victor E. Gatto, Huntington Hardwick, Ray Hornblower, Dan Jiggetts, Tommy Lee Jones, Robert F. Kennedy, Ted Kennedy, Everett J. Lake, William Henry Lewis, Lucius Nathan Littauer, Torbert MacDonald, Kenneth O'Donnell, Chester Middlebrook Pierce, Henry Dwight Sedgwick, Thomas F. Stephenson, Jeffrey Ross Toobin, Walter H. Trumbull, Pete Varney and W. Barry Wood, Jr. for Harvard;

- Fifteen Rhodes Scholarship recipients, eight representing Yale, seven representing Harvard;
- Heisman Trophy winners Larry Kelley and Clint Frank (Frank won also the Maxwell Award), both for Yale, and Heisman finalists Endicott Peabody II, an offensive lineman for Harvard, and Brian Dowling and Rich Diana, offensive backfield players, for Yale;
- Fifty members of the College Football Hall of Fame, twenty-nine affiliated with Yale and twenty-one affiliated with Harvard, the most recent inductees Dick Jauron from Yale, Class of 2015, and Pat McInally from Harvard, Class of 2016;
- Seventeen holders of the Asa S. Bushnell Cup, the Player of the Year award for Ivy League football, nine representing Harvard, eight representing Yale;
- Twenty-one designees to the Ivy League Silver Anniversary Team, sixteen from Yale and five from Harvard;
- Twenty winners of the Gridiron Club of Greater Boston's George H. "Bulger" Lowe Award, honoring New England's best collegiate football athlete, twelve from Harvard, eight from Yale – and eleven winners of the Nils V. "Swede" Nelson Award for "academics, athletics, sportsmanship and citizenship", seven from Yale, four from Harvard;
- Super Bowl participants Matt Birk, Rich Diana, John Dockery, Gary Fencik, Pat Graham, Calvin Hill, Kenny Hill, Isaiah Kacyvenski, Pat McInally, Chuck Mercein, and John Spagnola;
- Ninety Harvard football athletes are members of the Harvard Varsity Hall of Fame and twenty-seven Yale football athletes have won the William Mallory Award;
- Thirty-two teams, seventeen representing Harvard and fifteen representing Yale, have won outright or shared the Ivy League football title;
- Nearly 300 football All Americans are affiliated with the programs;
- Five Yale teams won enough support for inclusion on the season's final AP or UPI CollegeFootball Poll: 12th in 1936, 12th in 1937, 12th in 1946, and 14th in 1960 AP polls, with 17th- and 18th-place rankings, respectively, on the 1956 and 1960 UPI polls.

== Noteworthy pranks ==
=== 1933 ===
Prior to The Game Handsome Dan II, Yale's bulldog mascot, was kidnapped (allegedly by members of the Harvard Lampoon); then, the morning after a 19–6 upset by Harvard over Yale, after hamburger was smeared on the feet of the statue of John Harvard that sits in front of University Hall in Harvard Yard, an image was captured of Handsome Dan licking John Harvard's feet. The photo ran on the front page of papers throughout the country.

=== 1955 ===
Three greased pigs diverted the attention of 56,000 spectators at halftime on a snowy Saturday in New Haven. The pigs eluded tackles by groundskeepers and "compiled the most yards rushing of the afternoon", reported Charles Steedman of The Harvard Crimson. Rumor had it the Harvard Lampoon was responsible for the exhibition of porcine football skill on the gridiron. The Crimson reported "in any event it was certain [the pigs] hadn't been playmates of Handsome Dan".

=== 1961 ===
According to The Harvard Crimson: "In 1961, The Crimson handed out a parody of The Yale Daily News indicating that President John F. Kennedy '40 would be at the game in New Haven. At The Game, Robert Ellis Smith '62, the President of The Crimson, wore a mask of the President and walked onto the field, flanked by 'Secret Service' agents as the Harvard Band played 'Hail to the Chief.' Reportedly, thousands of spectators were fooled."

=== 1969 ===
Two staffers of the Harvard College paper published and distributed a mock copy of The Yale Daily News, datelined November 22, 1969. Readers were greeted with headlines "Disease Strikes 16 Eli Football Starters; Bulldogs Forced to Forfeit Harvard Game" and "Last Year's Stars Want to Fill in". Female cheerleaders were the alleged source of an STD rampaging through the football roster. Yale was in its first semester of coeducation.

=== 1983 ===
Several Yale students, dressed as members of the Harvard marching band, walked on to the field at halftime with the Harvard band and released a number of greased piglets on to the field.

=== 1992 ===
During the halftime show, the Harvard University Band attempted to alter the concluding "H-and-Y" joint formation by instead forming an "X" over the Yale Precision Marching Band's "Y" in an effort to symbolically "X out" Yale. The YPMB, having become aware of the Harvard prank, instead formed an "H", with the effect that the Harvard band "Xed out" Harvard.

=== 2004 ===
The prank at the 2004 edition of The Game was a card stunt in which Yale students, costumed as the Harvard pep squad, handed out placards to some 1,800 Harvard partisans, with instructions to hold them up after each Harvard score to spell out "Go Harvard". When raised, however, the cards actually displayed "WE SUCK", to the delight of the Yale students, alumni, and fans across the field. Harvard won the game, 35–3. Harvard students refused to believe eyewitnesses to the prank until video irrefutably confirmed it. The prank was featured by various print media, Jimmy Kimmel Live!, and MSNBC.

=== MIT "Hacks" ===
MIT has a roster of "Hacks" against supposed haughtiness by Harvard. Both universities are located in Cambridge, Massachusetts.

During the second quarter in 1982 at Harvard Stadium, a Harvard score was immediately followed by a huge black weather balloon inflating near midfield. "MIT" was proclaimed in painted letters on the slowly inflating balloon until it exploded, spraying powder over a few square yards of the field. Again in Harvard Stadium, MIT students secretly replaced the "VE-RI-TAS" insignia on the scoreboard with "HU-GE-EGO" in 2006.

== Little Red Flag ==
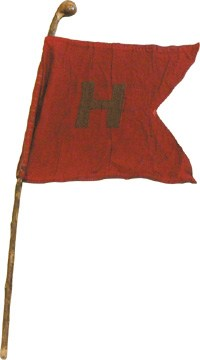

The Little Red Flag is a talisman that since 1884 has been waved by Harvard's "most loyal fan" after each score by Harvard against Yale. The original pennant was made of brick-red and magenta silk with an olive "H" stitched to one side. The original pennant was retired to a secret location when Paul Lee assumed the honor of waving a replacement after each score by Harvard.

The tradition began with Frederick Plummer, class of 1888, who attended the Harvard–Yale game 59 times between 1884 and his death in 1948. In 1950, when the flag appeared among the various unassigned items in Plummer's estate, William Bentinck-Smith, then editor of the Harvard Alumni Bulletin, suggested awarding the honor of carrying the flag on the day of The Game to the Harvard man in attendance who had seen the largest number of Yale games – and for the 1951 game it was awarded to Spencer Borden, class of 1894. The succession of holders has continued consecutively with Allen Rice, Richard P. Hallowell, Douglas Hamilton, James Dwinell, Harold Sedgewick, Sam McDonnell, Burdette Johnson, William Markus, Paul Lee, and Dick Bennink honored.

== See also ==
- List of NCAA college football rivalry games
- List of most-played college football series in NCAA Division I
- Harvard Beats Yale 29–29
- Harvard–Yale Regatta
- Big Three (colleges)
- Harvard–Yale soccer rivalry

== Bibliography ==
- Bergin, Thomas G. The Game: The Harvard–Yale Football Rivalry, 1875–1983 (Yale University Press, 1984)
- Bernstein, Mark. Football: The Ivy Origins of an American Obsession (University of Pennsylvania Press, 2001; ISBN 9780812236279)
- Corbett, Bernard M., and Paul Simpson. The Only Game That Matters (Crown, 2004; ISBN 1-4000-5068-5)
- Des Jardins, Julie. Walter Camp: Football and the Modern Man (Oxford University Press, New York, New York, 2015; ISBN 978-0-19-992562-9 (hardback))
- DuBois, Diana, editor. My Harvard, My Yale (Random House, New York, New York, 1982; ISBN 978-0394519203)
- Gitlin, Martin. The Greatest College Football Rivalries Of All Time: The Civil War, the Iron Bowl and Other Memorable Matchups (Rowland and Littlefield, London, United Kingdom, 2014; ISBN 978-1-4422-29839 (hardback))
- Kelley, Brooks Mather. Yale: A History, (Yale University Press, New Haven and London; ISBN 0-300-01636-0)
- Miller, John J. The Big Scrum: How Teddy Roosevelt Saved Football (Harper-Collins Publishers, New York, New York; ISBN 978-0-06-174450-1)
- Rafferty, Kevin, Harvard Beats Yale 29–29 (The Overlook Press, Peter Mayers Publishers, Inc., New York, New York, 2009; ISBN 978-1-59020-217-3)
- Smith, Ronald A., ed. Big-Time Football at Harvard, 1905, (University of Illinois Press, 1994; ISBN 0-252-02047-2)
- Smith, Ronald A., "Harvard and Columbia and a Reconsideration of the 1905–06 Football Crisis", Journal of Sports History, Volume 8, Number 3 (Winter, 1981)
