= Bob Adelman =

American photographer (1930–2016)

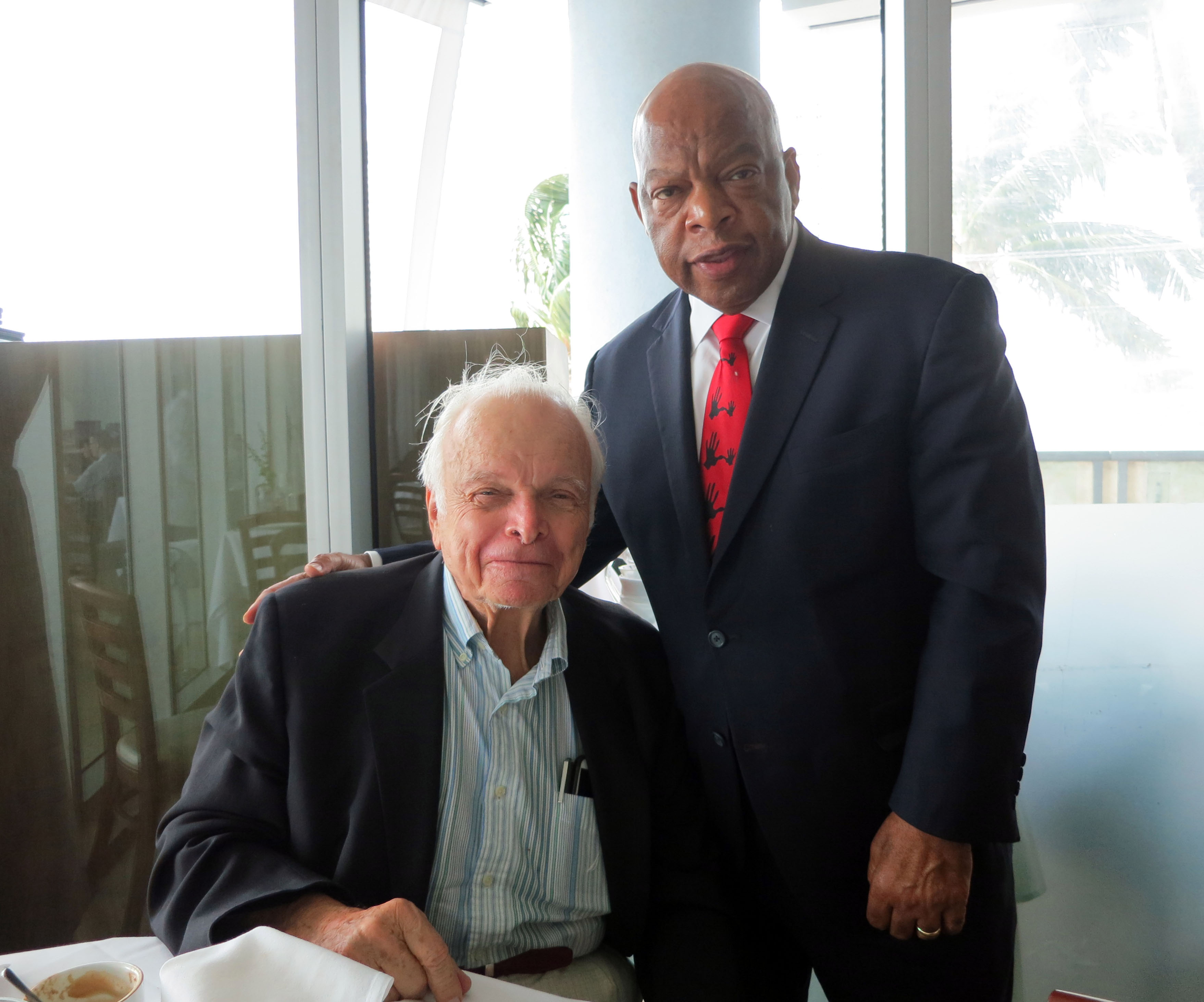
- Bob Adelman and Congressman John Lewis. Miami FL, November 2013
- Born: Robert Melvin Adelman; October 30, 1930
- Died: March 19, 2016 (aged 85)
- Education: Rutgers University; Harvard University; Columbia University
- Occupation: Photographer
- Known for: Photographic coverage of the US civil rights movement

Robert Melvin Adelman (October 30, 1930 – March 19, 2016) was an American photographer known for his images of the civil rights movement.

== Career ==
Adelman used his background as a graduate student in applied aesthetics from Columbia University to forge close ties with leading figures of art and literature, including Andy Warhol and Samuel Beckett. After studying photography for several years under the tutelage of Harper's Bazaar art director Alexey Brodovitch, Adelman volunteered as a photographer for the Congress of Racial Equality in the early 1960s, a position which granted him access to key leaders of the Civil Rights Movement, including Malcolm X, Martin Luther King Jr. and James Baldwin. Adelman's work captured a decade of racial strife during the 1960s, including portraits of Martin Luther King reciting his I Have a Dream speech, the fifty-mile march from Selma to Montgomery, and King resting in his casket after the assassination. His photos, some of which are archived at the Library of Congress, captured segregation and civil unrest in the South. In 2007, he published Mine Eyes Have Seen: Bearing Witness to the Struggle for Civil Rights.

Westwood Gallery NYC presented the premiere gallery exhibition for Bob Adelman's civil rights photographs in 2008, curated by James Cavello. The gallery held an event on 4 April 2008 marking the fortieth anniversary of King's death, during which actress and civil rights advocate Ruby Dee read from King's "Beyond Vietnam" speech. The gallery also exhibited and represents Adelman's photographs of New York artists, including Andy Warhol, Roy Lichtenstein, Tom Wesselmann, James Rosenquist, Robert Indiana, Adolph Gottlieb, other artists and social photographic essays.

On March 20, 2017, the Library of Congress Prints and Photographs Division officially acquired the Bob Adelman photographic archives which included the full spectrum of his work from his famed Civil Rights captures to his less celebrated pornographic bondage images. The archive includes approximately 50,000 prints and 525,000 image negatives and slides.

== Personal life ==
Adelman was born in Brooklyn, New York, to Eastern European Jewish parents, Anna (Pomerantz) and Samuel Adelman, who was a photographer and craftsman. Raised on Long Island, New York, he earned his B.A. at Rutgers University, Law Studies from Harvard University, and M.A. in Philosophy from Columbia University.

Adelman was the father of writer Elizabeth Wurtzel, a fact not disclosed publicly until Wurtzel did so around the time she turned 50 years old.

== Published works ==
- King, Martin Luther; Adelman, Bob (Ed.);& Johnson, Charles (Intro.). MLK: A Celebration in Word and Image. Beacon Press, 2011. ISBN 978-0-8070-0316-9
- Adelman, Bob and Hall, Susan. "Gentleman of Leisure: A Year in the Life of a Pimp". New American Library, 1972. ISBN 0913350508
- Adelman, Bob; Spiegelman, Art (Intro.), and Merkin, Richard (commentary). "Tijuana Bibles: Art and Wit in America's Forbidden Funnies, 1930-1950". Simon & Schuster Editions, c 1997. ISBN 0684834618
- Adelman, Bob; Tomkins, Calvin (Intro.). "The art of Roy Lichtenstein : Mural with blue brushstroke". Arcade Publishing, c 1987. ISBN 1559702516

== See also ==
- List of photographers of the civil rights movement
