= 2004 Harvard–Yale prank =

American football prank

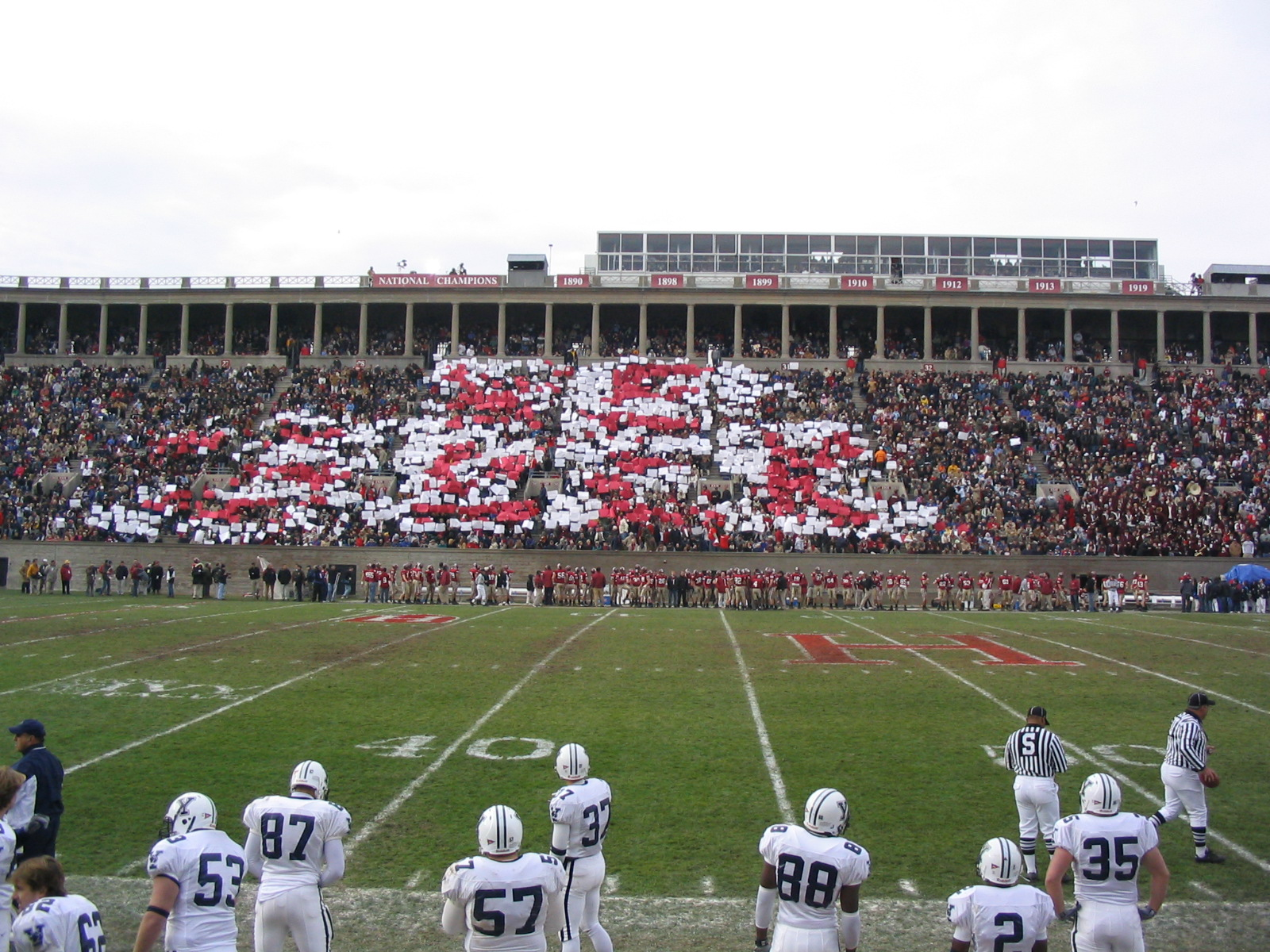
Harvard fans holding up placards - The Harvard Satyrical Press's photo

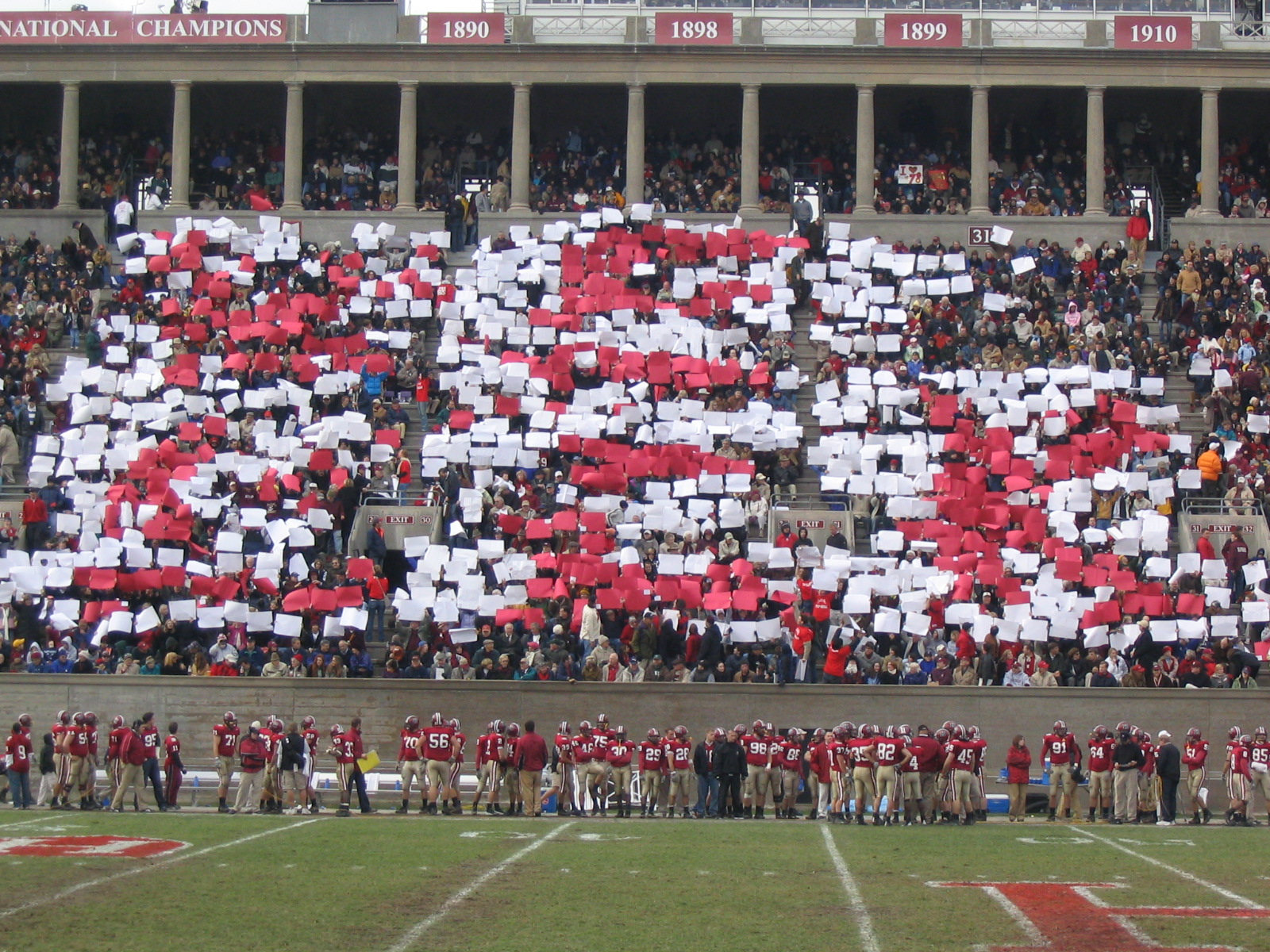
Another photo from the Harvard Satyrical Press, zooming into the crowd

At the annual Harvard–Yale football game on November 20, 2004, Yale students, costumed as a Harvard "pep squad", distributed placards to Harvard fans for a card stunt. When the fans raised the placards together, they read "We Suck".

The practical joke was conceived of and coordinated by Michael Kai and David Aulicino, two Yale students in the class of 2005, and was executed with the help of 20 classmates. The perpetrators handed crimson-and-white placards to fans in the central area of the Harvard side of the stadium—mostly Harvard alumni, with a few faculty, students, and others. The group told the crowd that, by lifting the placards, they would spell "Go Harvard".

Most Harvard students were sitting in a section off to the side of the alumni area where the prank was executed, and they left the stands unaware of the prank; however, players on the field did see the placards.

== Response ==
Initially, many at Harvard denied that the prank had happened. In response, Yale students registered the domain name "harvardsucks.org" (as well as "yalesucks.org" in a preemptive move) (Note: Both "yalesucks.org" and "yalesucks.com" were registered as domain names shortly after the prank, redirecting to "harvardsucks.org". In contrast, "harvardsucks.com" appears to be an unrelated ad platform dating back to 2001.) and posted a video detailing their efforts. Chuck Sullivan, Harvard's director of athletic communications, said, "[It was] all in good fun." In an interview with The Harvard Crimson, the prank's organizers claimed that members of the Harvard Band were complicit with the Yale pranksters.

== Media and internet coverage ==
The prank was covered by newspapers, radio programs, Jimmy Kimmel Live!, MSNBC, and several other TV shows. Several magazines have listed the prank among the greatest in college history.

== Similar pranks ==
In 2007, a senior at Hilliard Davidson High School in Columbus, Ohio pulled a copycat prank on Hilliard Darby High School during a football game and was suspended for three days; his prank was recorded on YouTube.

In 2024, two YouTubers pranked Paris Saint-Germain F.C. fans by putting an Olympique de Marseille tifo in the stands of the Parc des Princes during a Coupe de France game.

== See also ==
- Great Rose Bowl Hoax
- List of practical joke topics
