= James Willse =

American journalist (born 1944)

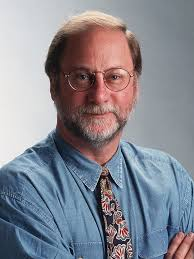
Jim Willse

James Willse is an American journalist who served as editor of The New York Daily News from 1989 to 1993 and of The Star-Ledger in New Jersey from 1995 until his retirement in 2011. He is credited with leading The News out of bankruptcy and with modernizing The Star-Ledger.

Willse was born on March 17, 1944, in Teaneck, New Jersey, and raised in Babylon, N.Y. He graduated from Hamilton College and the Columbia University Graduate School of Journalism.

Willse's first newspaper job was as a copy boy at The New York Times. He left college in 1965 to be a reporter with The Southern Courier, a weekly that covered civil rights in Alabama. Returning to Hamilton, he worked as a reporter at the nearby Utica, N.Y., Daily Press. After graduating from Columbia, he was a national reporter and editor with The Associated Press from 1969 to 1977. Following a one-year fellowship at Stanford University, where he studied international economics and law. he was News Editor of the AP San Francisco Bureau until he joined the staff of the San Francisco Examiner. He was city editor and managing editor with The San Francisco Examiner from 1977 to 1984. He joined The New York Daily News in 1985 as managing editor and was named editor in 1989.

In 1990, the paper underwent a five-month strike, followed by its sale by Tribune Co. to British press lord Robert Maxwell. Following Maxwell's death in 1991, Willse assumed the additional role of publisher. During that time, he oversaw the paper's Chapter 11 reorganization and eventual sale in 1992 to Mort Zuckerman.

Willse joined Advance Newspapers later in 1993 as director of new media, and became editor of The Star-Ledger in January 1995. In 2000, the National Press Foundation named him Editor of the Year. During his 15-year tenure, the newspaper was a finalist for the Pulitzer Prize eight times, winning twice. Willse retired as editor in October 2011 and was succeeded by Kevin Whitmer.

Willse has taught a variety of courses in nonfiction writing, including twice as a visiting professor at Princeton University. He was a board member of NJSpotlight, a nonprofit news organization, until its acquisition by WNET-TV in 2019.
