= Robert Ellis Smith =

American attorney, author, and journalist (1940–2018)

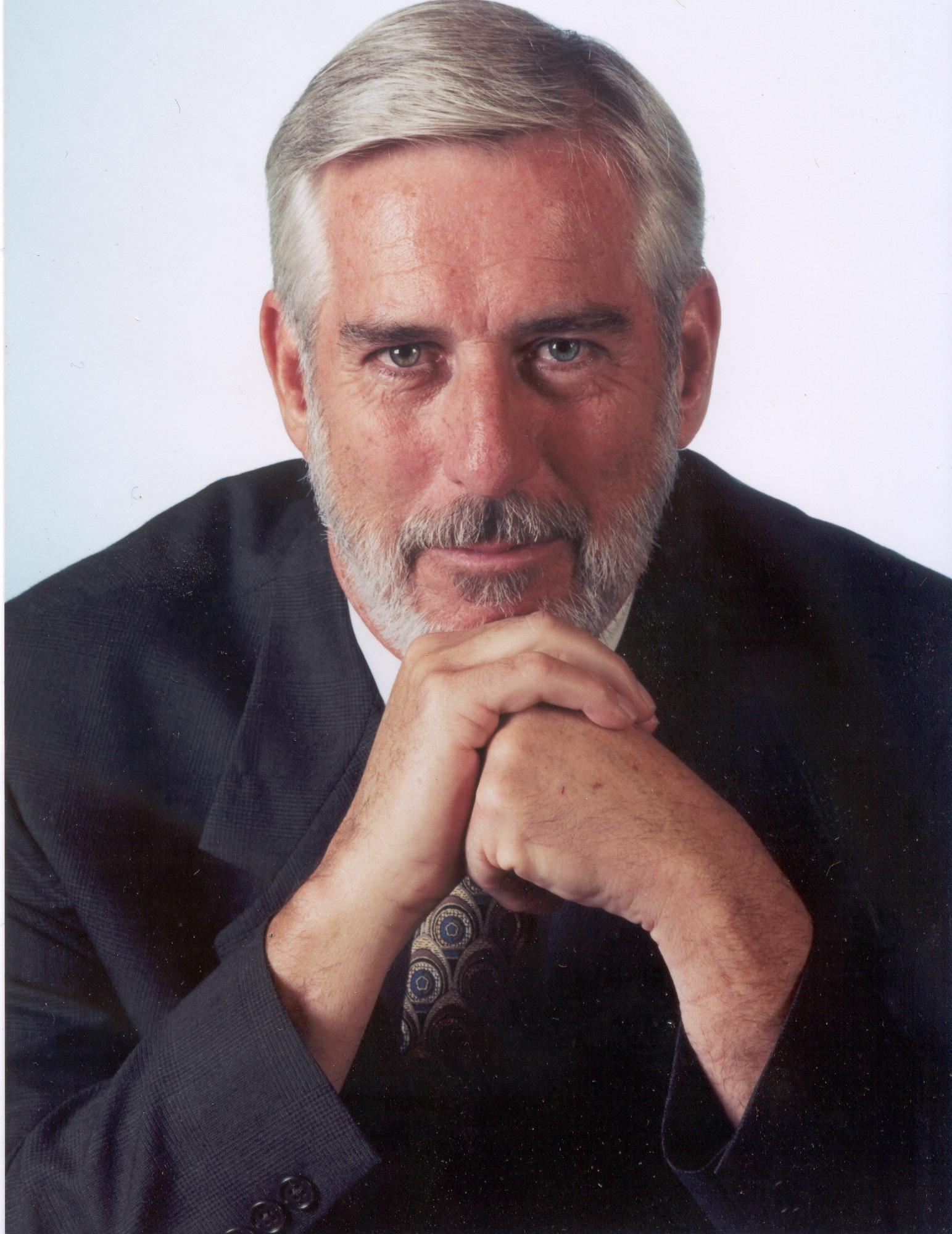
- Born: September 6, 1940; Providence, Rhode Island
- Died: July 25, 2018 (aged 77)
- Education: Harvard College, 1962; Georgetown University Law Center, 1975
- Occupations: Attorney, publisher/journalist, author
- Known for: Privacy, civil rights, environmental protection
- Spouse: Kathryn Ritter-Smith (divorced)

Robert Ellis Smith (September 6, 1940 – July 25, 2018) was an American attorney, author, and a publisher/journalist whose focus is mainly privacy rights.

Robert began his career in journalism during high school and while attending Harvard. He was president of The Harvard Crimson. After college, he wrote for newspapers such as the Detroit Free Press, Newsday in New York City, and The Southern Courier. He also worked for the American Civil Liberties Union.

Starting in 1974, he published Privacy Journal newsletter, as well as several books, such as Ben Franklin’s Website: Privacy and Curiosity from Plymouth Rock to the Internet (2000/2004). From the book: "Just what is privacy? It is the desire of each of us for physical space where we can be free of interruption, intrusion, embarrassment, or accountability and the attempt to control the time and manner of disclosures of personal information about ourselves."

He wrote Workrights (1983, E.P. Dutton),The Law of Privacy Explained (1993, Privacy Journal), and Privacy: How to Protect What’s Left of It (1979, Doubleday) The 1979 book was nominated for a National Book Award. For more than 40 years, Smith edited successive editions of Compilation of State and Federal Privacy Laws, which is now available in hard copy (2018), eBook mode, and as an edition available for loading onto hand-held devices. This allows individuals to consult their palm devices, in the workplace or the marketplace, to determine whether privacy protections cover certain transactions. He continued to write and publish "Privacy Journal", one of the longest running newsletters in North America, and was often called to speak and testify concerning privacy rights. Smith was twice asked to write the definition of privacy for the World Book Encyclopedia.

Smith was the author also of "Our Vanishing Privacy" (Loompanics Unlimited, 1993). He is co-author of "The Big Brother Book of Lists" (1984, Price/Stern/Sloan), published to commemorate the fateful year of 1984.

Smith, formerly active as a land conservationist for environmental protection, wrote four editions of a quiz book called Block Island Trivia, about the tiny island off the coast of Rhode Island. In the 1990s, he was president of the Block Island Conservancy, a nonprofit group that purchases land to maintain it as open space. In the 1990s, he was vice-chair of the Rhode Island Coastal Resources Management Council, which is responsible for preservation and orderly development of land within 200 yards of the entire coastline of Rhode Island.

Smith posed as President Kennedy, fooling the crowd in a notorious stunt at the Harvard-Yale football game in 1961.

Early in his career, in 1965 and 1966, he edited and managed a weekly newspaper founded by young civil rights workers to cover the civil rights movement in Alabama and Mississippi, The Southern Courier. see "Reflections." He then was a consultant on press coverage of racial rioting to the National Advisory Commission on Civil Disorders. He served on the District of Columbia Human Rights Commission in the 1980s. He taught at Brown University, University of Maryland, Harvard College, and Roger Williams University Law School.

He was also an actor, performing several roles in community theaters in southern New England. In 2018, he released his latest work, an eBook entitled Faces I Have Known: Encounters With Famous Persons (2018, Privacy Journal, Kindle.com). It includes up-close portraits of Castro, Robert F. Kennedy, Steinem, James Hoffa, Martin Luther King, Jr., Rosa Parks and many others based on a six decades career in journalism.

There is a digital collection of his works and his source materials that covers such topics as cybersecurity, privacy in employment, medical care, identity theft, including the back issues of Privacy Journal since 1974 in the UMass Amherst: University Libraries.

== Books ==
- Robert Ellis Smith. Privacy, how to protect what's left of it (1979). Publisher: Anchor Press; 1st ed edition.
- Robert Ellis Smith. Workrights (1983). Publisher: Plume (August 24, 1983)
- Robert Ellis Smith, co-author. The Big Brother Book of Lists (1984). Publisher: Penguin Publishing Group, Stern
- Robert Ellis Smith. Our Vanishing Privacy: And What You Can Do to Protect Yours by Robert Ellis Smith (1993). Publisher: Breakout Productions (May 1993)
- Robert Ellis Smith. The Law of Privacy Explained (1993). Publisher: Privacy Journal (January 1, 1993) Language: English
- Robert Ellis Smith. Ben Franklin's Web Site: Privacy and Curiosity from Plymouth Rock to the Internet (2004). Publisher: Privacy Journal; First edition (April 30, 2004)
- Robert Ellis Smith. Block Island Trivia (2008). Publisher: Privacy Journal, Kindle
- Robert Ellis Smith. Compilation of State and Federal Privacy Laws (2018). Publisher: Privacy Journal, Kindle
- Robert Ellis Smith. The Magnetism of Islands (2012). Publisher: Privacy Journal, Kindle
- Robert Ellis Smith. Faces I Have Known (2018). Publisher: Privacy Journal, Kindle
