= Jim Peppler =

American photographer

James H. Peppler is a former newspaper photographer for The Southern Courier during the Civil Rights Era and then Newsday in Long Island, New York. He captured images of the Civil Rights Era in central Alabama. He later worked in New York City and taught photojournalism.

He was born in Philadelphia, Pennsylvania and grew up in South Philadelphia. He graduated from Pennsylvania State University. He was a staff photographer for the weekly Southern Courier newspaper in Montgomery, Alabama from 1965 to 1968. The paper was established by Harvard Crimson staff to report on events in the South.

After his time in Alabama, Peppler worked for Newsday in New York City for 38 years and taught photojournalism at Adelphi University and Stony Brook University.

He photographed subjects in central Alabama and other areas of the South including Fred L. Shuttlesworth, Rev. Hosea Williams, B.B. King, The Marvelettes, Laicos Club in Montgomery and Martin Luther King, Jr.'s funeral. He left Alabama not long after King was assassinated.

Many of his photographs have been digitized by the Alabama Department of Archives and History and are available online. During his time in Alabama he was jailed and beaten.

His work is part of a display at the Rosa Parks Hempstead Transit Center.

In 2022 he was living in Saugerties, New York. Bob Fitch photographed Peppler in Mississippi in June 1966.
