= The Southern Courier =

Defunct newspaper in Montgomery, Alabama

The Southern Courier was a weekly newspaper published in Montgomery, Alabama, from 1965 to 1968, during the Civil Rights Movement. As one of a few newspapers to cover the movement with an emphasis on African-American communities in the South, it provided its readership with a comprehensive view of race relations and community and is considered an important source for historians.

== History ==
=== Preparation ===
In 1964, two students who had traveled to Mississippi to cover and assist in the Civil Rights Movement, Peter Cummings, a staff member of The Harvard Crimson, Harvard University's student newspaper, and Ellen Lake, formerly of the Crimson, were dismayed by the lack of coverage in the Southern papers and the sensationalist reporting of civil rights activities. They conceived of a newspaper that would cover issues not reported in the Southern newspapers, and often not in the national press.

As announced in The Harvard Crimson, the idea was to form a newspaper that would provide news about civil rights activities and protests in the Southern United States, which, the paper argued, were frequently underreported or ignored by Southern editors. Conversely, Northern newspapers had little distribution in the South. A newspaper that gave "a full and accurate account of the [Civil Rights] movement, its goals and tactics," with "fair reporting", would both provide better information about the South and simultaneously "advance the movement in the Negro community", and "would go far toward knitting the various Negro communities of the South together". The students raised money from private sources ($68,500 being the initial goal), since the editors did not expect to receive tax-exempt status given the heated nature of such a paper; thus large foundations would be unlikely to contribute. Once established in Montgomery, the organization achieved tax-exempt status.

=== Founding in Atlanta, move to Montgomery ===
The paper was a multiracial effort, and its reporters were asked to integrate into the localities they covered as much as possible, without being either unattached "drive-by" journalists or involved community activists. Michael S. Lottman, managing editor of The Harvard Crimson until 1962, became its editor in 1965 and again from 1966–68.

It was to be based out of Atlanta, Georgia, run by Harvard students, including a number of students from The Harvard Crimson. The paper was started with $30,000 of seed money, and reporters were paid $20 a week. The plan was to have separate papers for individual states. In the first summer it was based and printed in Atlanta. Then it moved to Montgomery, Alabama, a city that was the focus of much attention since the Selma to Montgomery marches earlier that year.

In September 1965, when Lottman returned to his newspaper job in Chicago, Robert Ellis Smith became editor; he had worked as a reporter at the Detroit Free Press and Trenton Times and had become anxious about the state of the country after the Sunday School bombing in Birmingham.

The weekly paper borrowed from The Harvard Crimson its six-column, six-page appearance, its allegiance to well-sourced and balanced stories, its professional headlines, its immediacy, its inclusion of items about the arts, TV, some sports, individual profiles, first-person accounts, and attention to all sides of the civil rights battle. On the tenth anniversary of the Montgomery bus Boycott in 1955, the paper published memoirs by Martin Luther King Jr., and Rosa Parks. Graphic dispatches from Tuskegee, Alabama, by executive editor Mary Ellen Gale, were highlights of many issues.

Lottman caught the essence of the paper in speaking of how it covered the core details of the federal War on Poverty, "The coverage by the Courier was just about the only way, at that time, that readers found out what people in other places were doing, what kinds of issues others were confronting and letting them know that they were not alone."

Other editors and writers for the Courier included Stephen Cotton, originally from Chicago and later a student at Harvard's law school, an editor for the Crimson, and co-organizer (with Denis Hayes) of the first Earth Day events; and Marshall Bloom, who had gotten arrested in Selma in 1964 and later enrolled at Amherst College before founding the Liberation News Service with Ray Mungo.

=== Funding ===
The Courier sustained itself, week to week, on paid mailed subscriptions outside the South, on revenues from street and door-to-door sales in two dozen communities in Alabama and nearby Mississippi, and importantly from a few grants from Northern-based foundations. The 30,000 papers were shipped every Thursday night by Greyhound buses throughout Alabama to "stringers" who distributed them locally (and for the most part provided news tips and written reports back to the Montgomery office). It cost about $10,000 per month. A $60,000 grant from the Ford Foundation in 1967 gave the paper another year, but in the end funding dried up, in part because opposition to the Vietnam War attracted more attention from donors in the late 1960s. On December 7, 1968, the last issue - the 150th consecutive issue - was printed and distributed.

=== Legacy ===
Many of the Courier's staff went on to work in law, public service, journalism, and causes devoted to social justice, with non-profit organizations. The chief photographer of the Courier' was Jim Peppler. The notable photos he took for the paper over its 3 1/2 years life are archived at the Alabama Department of Archives and History. Lottman said of Peppler, "He depicted people like the people who read - and who we wanted to read - the paper in ways they had never been seen in the local press."

A reunion was held in 2006 at Auburn University in Montgomery, on the occasion of the annual Clifford and Virginia Durr Lecture Series. One black man from a remote corner of southeast Alabama showed up with a copy of the paper, from 40 years earlier, simply to say thanks to the staff. At that gathering the former staff members established a web site, and made sure that back issues were available in digital and hard-copy form at appropriate libraries. Jon Lottman digitized the entire range of back issues and created a video of the reunion.

== Staff ==
Among the notable staff members of the Courier were:

- Viola Bradford, Alabama journalist and journalism teacher
- Stephen E. Cotton, Boston attorney and media director for the first Earth Day
- Geoffrey Cowan, former director of the Voice of America and professor and dean at University of Southern California's USC Annenberg School for Communication and Journalism
- Gail Falk, veteran of Freedom Summer in Mississippi in 1964 and later advocate for persons with disabilities in the Department of Mental Health, Vermont
- James M. Fallows, White House speechwriter and long-time correspondent for The Atlantic Monthly
- Barbara Howard Flowers, Montgomery civil rights activist later affiliated with Tuskegee Institute before her death
- Mary Ellen Gale, journalist, constitutional law professor at Whittier Law School, California, and former elected member of the national board American Civil Liberties Union
- Mary Graham, former part owner of The Washington Post and author of books on the environment and health and safety
- Ellen Lake, employment-rights lawyer in Oakland
- Michael S. Lottman, Chicago journalist and mental-health patients-rights attorney in Tennessee and the Northeast U.S.
- Kenneth Lumpkin, a young man from Alabama whom Jim Peppler mentored as a photographer, later publisher of a small newspaper in Racine, Wisconsin
- Norman Lumpkin, pioneering TV newsman for WSFA in Montgomery
- Nelson Malden, Montgomery civil rights activist, intimate to Martin Luther King Jr., during the Bus Boycott and thereafter, and co-author of The Colored Waiting Room
- Henry Clay Moorer, a kid from Greenville, Alabama, who continued to write for the Courier when sent to Vietnam for military service
- James H. Peppler, former staff photographer for Newsday, Long Island, N.Y.
- Mertis Rubin, who joined the staff from Mendenhall, Mississippi, and outshone veteran reporters on the civil rights beat for major outlets, later a nurse before her death
- Robert Ellis Smith, publisher of Privacy Journal monthly newsletter and member of the District of Columbia Human Rights Commission.
- Joan C. Turnow, writing instructor and author
- James Willse, former editor of the Newark Star-Ledger and New York Daily News
