= Bob Fitch (photographer) =

American photographer

Robert De Witt Fitch (1939–2016) was an American photographer during the civil rights movement.

== Early life and education ==
Robert De Witt Fitch was born on July 20, 1939, in Los Angeles, California. His parents were Robert Fitch and Marion Weeks De Witt. His father was a minister with the United Church of Christ and professor of Christian ethics.

Fitch went to high school in Berkeley, California, during the 1950s. In 1961, Fitch earned a B.A. in Psychology at Lewis & Clark College. Fitch later earned both a B.A. and a Master of Divinity at the Pacific School of Religion. His father was dean of the Pacific School of Religion. In 1965, Fitch was ordained by the United Church of Christ.

== Early career ==
Early in his career, Fitch served as an intern at Glide Memorial United Methodist Church in San Francisco. There he worked with groups including street gangs, the homeless, hippies and LGBT groups. Fitch was later a labor organizer and a draft resistance counselor. Fitch worked at the California Department of Housing and Community Development and at the Resource Center for Nonviolence, in Sacramento and Santa Cruz.

== Death and legacy ==
Fitch died on April 29, 2016, in Watsonville, California. He was aged 76 and died from complications of Parkinson's disease.

An archive of Fitch's photos is held at Stanford University Libraries. The archive is described as containing "over 200,000 images, primarily black and white photographs and negatives, spanning the period from 1965 to the present."

== See also ==
- List of photographers of the civil rights movement
