= List of Tommy Lee Jones performances =

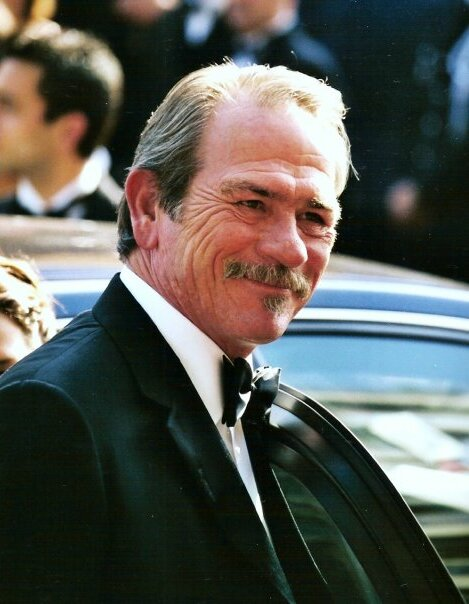
Jones in 2005

American actor Tommy Lee Jones has appeared in numerous films and television series as well as in a few New York plays since his acting debut in 1970. One of his first notable roles was as Oliver "Doolittle Mooney" Lynn in Coal Miner's Daughter with Sissy Spacek (1980). He played one of his most notable roles as U.S. Marshal Samuel "Sam" Gerard in the 1993 thriller film The Fugitive with Harrison Ford. He has had starring roles in the films The Client (1994), Natural Born Killers (1994), Cobb (1994), and Volcano (1997). Also in 1997, he was cast as Agent K in the science fiction action comedy film Men in Black opposite Will Smith, a role he went on to reprise in Men in Black II (2002), and Men in Black 3 (2012).

Other notable film roles include terrorist William "Bill" Strannix in Under Siege (1992), villain Two-Face in Batman Forever (1995), parole officer Travis Lehman in Double Jeopardy, Texas Ranger Roland Sharp in Man of the House (2005), rancher Pete Perkins in The Three Burials of Melquiades Estrada (2005), Sheriff Ed Tom Bell in No Country for Old Men (2007), Hank Deerfield in In the Valley of Elah (2007), Colonel Chester Phillips in Captain America: The First Avenger (2011), and CIA Director Robert Dewey in Jason Bourne (2016).

He has played several real-life people in films, including: businessman Clay Shaw in JFK (1991), Radical Republican Congressman Thaddeus Stevens in Lincoln (2012), U.S. Army General Douglas MacArthur in Emperor (2012), Joseph L. Galloway in Shock and Awe (2017), and Jeremiah Joseph O'Keefe in The Burial (2023).

His notable television roles include playing Howard Hughes in the television film The Amazing Howard Hughes (1977) and Texas Ranger Woodrow F. Call in the television miniseries Lonesome Dove (1989).

== Film ==
Year	Title	Role	Notes	Ref.
1970	Love Story	Hank Simpson		
1973	Life Study	Gus		
1975	Eliza's Horoscope	Tommy Lee		
1976	Jackson County Jail	Coley Blake		
1977	Rolling Thunder	Master Sergeant Johnny Vohden		
1978	The Betsy	Angelo Perino		
1978	Eyes of Laura Mars	Detective John Neville		
1980	Coal Miner's Daughter	Oliver "Doolittle Mooney" Lynn		
1980	Barn Burning	Abner Snopes	Short film	
1981	Back Roads	Elmore Pratt		
1983	Nate and Hayes	Captain "Bully" Hayes	Also known as Savage Islands	
1984	The River Rat	Billy		
1986	Black Moon Rising	Sam Quint		
1987	The Big Town	George Cole		
1988	Stormy Monday	Francis Cosmo		
1989	The Package	Thomas Boyette		
1990	Fire Birds	Captain Brad Little		
1991	JFK	Clay Shaw / Clay Bertrand		
1992	Under Siege	William "Bill" Strannix		
1993	House of Cards	Jake Beerlander		
1993	The Fugitive	U.S. Deputy Marshal Samuel "Sam" Gerard		
1993	Heaven & Earth	Steve Butler		
1994	Blown Away	Ryan Gaerity		
1994	The Client	Roy "Reverend Roy" Foltrigg		
1994	Natural Born Killers	Warden Dwight McClusky		
1994	Blue Sky	Major Hank Marshall		
1994	Cobb	Ty Cobb		
1995	Batman Forever	Harvey Dent / Two-Face		
1997	Volcano	Michael Roark		
1997	Men in Black	Kevin Brown / Agent K		
1998	U.S. Marshals	U.S. Deputy Marshal Samuel "Sam" Gerard		
1998	Small Soldiers	Major Chip Hazard	Voice	
1999	Double Jeopardy	Travis Lehman		
2000	Rules of Engagement	Colonel Hayes "Hodge" Hodges		
2000	Space Cowboys	William "Hawk" Hawkins		
2002	Men in Black II	Kevin Brown / Agent K		
2003	The Hunted	L.T. Bonham		
2003	The Missing	Samuel Jones		
2005	Man of the House	Ranger Lieutenant Roland Sharp	Also executive producer	
2005	The Three Burials of Melquiades Estrada	Pete Perkins	Also producer and director	
2006	A Prairie Home Companion	Axeman		
2007	No Country for Old Men	Sheriff Ed Tom Bell		
2007	In the Valley of Elah	Hank Deerfield		
2008	Harvard Beats Yale 29–29	Himself	Documentary	
2009	In the Electric Mist	Dave Robicheaux		
2010	The Company Men	Gene McClary		
2011	Captain America: The First Avenger	Colonel Chester Phillips		
2012	Men in Black 3	Kevin Brown / Agent K		
2012	Hope Springs	Arnold Soames		
2012	Lincoln	Thaddeus Stevens		
2012	Emperor	General Douglas MacArthur		
2013	The Family	FBI Agent Robert Stansfield		
2014	The Homesman	George Briggs	Also writer, executive producer and director	
2016	Criminal	Dr. Micah Franks		
2016	Jason Bourne	CIA Director Robert Dewey		
2016	Mechanic: Resurrection	Max Adams		
2017	Shock and Awe	Joseph L. Galloway		
2017	Just Getting Started	Leo McKay		
2019	Ad Astra	Clifford McBride		
2020	Wander	Jimmy Cleats		
2020	The Comeback Trail	Duke Montana		
2023	Finestkind	Ray Eldridge		
2023	The Burial	Jerry O'Keefe		
2026	Angel and the Badman	Marshal McClintock		
TBA	The Razor's Edge	Taxman	Post-production	

== Television ==
Year	Title	Role	Notes	Ref.
1971–1975	One Life to Live	Dr. Mark Toland	21 episodes	
1975	Barnaby Jones	Dr. Jim Melford	Episode: "Fatal Witness"	
1976	Smash-Up on Interstate 5	Officer Hutton	Television film	
1976	Baretta	Sharky	Episode: "Dead Man Out"	
1976	Charlie's Angels	Aram Kolegian	Episode: "Charlie's Angels"	
1976	Family	David Needham	Episode: "Coming of Age"	
1977	The Amazing Howard Hughes	Howard Hughes	Television film	
1982	The Executioner's Song	Gary Gilmore	Television film	
1982	The Rainmaker	Starbuck	Television film	
1984	Cat on a Hot Tin Roof	"Brick" Pollitt	Television film	
1985	The Park Is Mine	Mitch Garnett	Television film	
1986	Yuri Nosenko: Double Agent	Steve Daley	Television film	
1987	Broken Vows	Peter Joseph McMahon	Television film	
1988	Gotham	Eddie Mallard	Television film	
1988	Stranger on My Land	Bud Whitman	Television film	
1988	April Morning	Moses Cooper	Television film	
1989	Lonesome Dove	Woodrow F. Call	Miniseries	
1995	The Good Old Boys	Hewey Calloway	Television film, also director	
2011	The Sunset Limited	White	Television film, also director and executive producer	
2026	The Lowdown	Lee Raybon Sr.	Main role (season 2)	

== Stage ==
Year	Production	Role	Venue	Ref.
1969	A Patriot for Me	Various	Imperial Theatre	
1971	Four on a Garden	Joel	Broadhurst Theatre	
1974	Ulysses in Nighttown	Stephen Dedalus	Winter Garden Theatre	
1980	True West	Austin	The Public Theater	
