= Don Gillis (sportscaster) =

Canadian-born American sportscaster

Donald A. Gillis (August 1, 1922 – April 23, 2008) was a Canadian-born American sportscaster who was sports director of Boston's Channel 5 (WHDH-TV through March 18, 1972; thereafter WCVB-TV) from 1962 through 1983. Gillis pioneered the 11 p.m. sports report in Boston during his tenure at WHDH-TV, becoming the dean of the city's sports anchors, and also would host highly popular candlepin bowling programs on the station. When the show debuted on October 4, 1958, it was hosted by Jim Britt, and Gillis was the co-host. When Britt left in 1967, Gillis began hosting the show himself.

== Radio and sportscasting career ==
Gillis was born in Antigonish, Nova Scotia, and his family moved to New Bedford, Massachusetts, when he was still a boy. After attending Holy Family High School in that city, he served in the U.S. Navy during World War II in the Pacific Theater of operations. At war's end, he attended Boston's Leland Powers School of Broadcasting on the GI Bill and began a career in radio broadcasting at New Bedford's WBSM-AM in 1949, becoming that station's first sports director. In 1951, he joined the on-air staff of Boston's WHDH-AM 850, where he hosted music programs before focusing exclusively on sports.

WHDH at the time was the flagship station of the Boston Red Sox, and carried Boston Celtics basketball, Boston Bruins hockey and Harvard University football during the autumn and winter months. Gillis hosted pregame coverage of Red Sox games — his "Warmup Time" five-minute segment often revisited great moments in baseball history – and was a color commentator on Bruins and Celtics games. During the 1957 season, he joined the Red Sox' broadcast team when the primary announcer, Curt Gowdy, was sidelined for the year by a back injury. Gillis also called New England Patriots preseason games.

The most famous play-by-play single game he called was the 29–29 tie 1968 Harvard–Yale football game. A color kinescope of the telecast was featured prominently as the basis for the 2008 documentary film Harvard Beats Yale 29-29, so called because Harvard came from 16 points behind with 42 seconds to play to tie on a two-point conversion on the last play of the game. In addition, Gillis hosted a weekly sports roundtable radio show, called "Voice of Sports," that featured sportswriters Bill Liston and Tim Horgan from the Boston Herald-Traveler (which owned WHDH) and other personalities, such as longtime Pittsburgh Pirates scout Chick Whalen and NBC Sports producer Joe Costanza.

During the mid-to-late 1960s, he was the play-by-play announcer for a limited schedule of Boston Celtic games on WHDH-TV.

== Television sports anchor ==
But Gillis became best known as a television sports anchor. He began his sports report on October 1, 1962 (the same night Johnny Carson debuted as host of The Tonight Show). WHDH-TV expanded its late news from 15 minutes to a full half-hour to accommodate extended weather and sports segments. During the period when WHDH-TV held the license to Boston's Channel 5, the station was the flagship of the Red Sox TV network. After the team's improbable 1967 American League pennant, its TV ratings soared and Gillis was able to use film highlights of the team's games during his sportscasts. However, relatively few of the games were telecast compared to today's diet of 162 regular season broadcasts, and Ch. 5 would send a cameraman to the games that were not telecast live. This often meant that the 11 p.m. newscast featured only highlights from the early through middle innings, since the film had to be rushed from Fenway Park to the station's studios in Dorchester to be developed, edited and finally aired. Gillis would use the filmed highlights to set the stage for "telling" the audience about the late, and often decisive, action.

In March 1972, however, Herald-Traveler Corp. lost its battle for a permanent license for the television property. Gillis, along with much of the on-air staff, were hired by the new licensee, Boston Broadcasters Inc., to establish an on-air presence at the new WCVB-TV, and Gillis carried on as sports director. Even though the Red Sox did not follow, ratings for the station's newscasts at 6 and 11 p.m. remained high. When WCVB-TV was acquired by Metromedia in 1982 for the highest price then ever paid for a local television station, Gillis was one of many stockholders who profited handsomely from the transaction.

== Candlepin Bowling host ==
He retired from NewsCenter 5 broadcasts a year after the sale, although his son, Gary Gillis, continued as a sportscaster and sports anchor in the market for the city's Channel 7, which assumed the WHDH-TV call-letters in 1990. Don Gillis would continue to host the Saturday afternoon Candlepin Bowling show on WCVB until its cancellation on January 27, 1996. He was elected to the World Candlepin Bowling Council's Hall of Fame for "extraordinary service" in 1987.

Gillis retired to his home in Falmouth on Cape Cod. During his last years, he suffered from Alzheimer's disease. He also endured a series of strokes three weeks before his death at home.
