= Pete Varney =

American baseball player (born 1949)

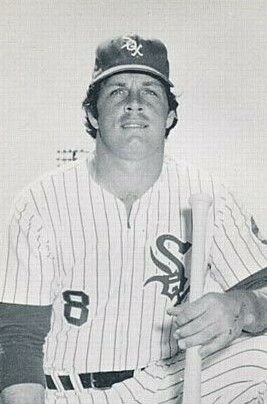
- Catcher
- Born: April 10, 1949 (age 77); Roxbury, Massachusetts, U.S.
- Batted: Right Threw: Right

MLB debut
- August 26, 1973, for the Chicago White Sox

Last MLB appearance
- September 12, 1976, for the Atlanta Braves

MLB statistics
- Batting average: .247
- Home runs: 5
- Runs batted in: 15
- Stats at Baseball Reference

Teams
- Chicago White Sox (1973–1976); Atlanta Braves (1976)

Richard Fred "Pete" Varney Jr. (born April 10, 1949) is an American retired college baseball coach and a former professional baseball catcher. A graduate of Harvard College, he also played a notable role in the 1968 Yale vs. Harvard football game, in which Harvard roared back from a 29–13 deficit in the final 42 seconds of play to tie Yale, 29–29. Both teams were undefeated at the time.

Born in Roxbury, Massachusetts, Varney attended North Quincy High School and Deerfield Academy before enrolling at Harvard, where he played varsity football as well as baseball. In the 85th Harvard–Yale game on November 23, 1968, tight end Varney caught Frank Champi's pass for the two-point conversion in the final second to earn a tie, and a share of the Ivy League championship, with Yale. Although the famous game ended deadlocked, the furious comeback caused The Harvard Crimson to headline its game story, Harvard Beats Yale 29–29. A standout in baseball, Varney batted .370 over his three varsity seasons, still the third-highest batting average in Crimson baseball history, and was selected a first-team All-American.

After being drafted six previous times by five different Major League Baseball teams, Varney signed with the Chicago White Sox after they selected him in the first round of the secondary phase of the 1971 Major League Baseball draft following his graduation from Harvard. The 6 ft 3 in (1.91 m), 235 lb (107 kg) catcher began his professional career at the Double-A level of minor league baseball and made his Major League debut late in 1973, appearing in five games played and going hitless in four at bats. In his most successful season, 1975, Varney appeared in 36 games as the backup to regular ChiSox catcher Brian Downing, batting .271 in 107 at bats.

In 1976, Varney played sporadically for the White Sox during the season's first ten weeks, logging 43 plate appearances with ten hits and two bases on balls, but he did hit three of his five career MLB home runs during that stretch. On July 15, he was traded to the Atlanta Braves for pitcher Blue Moon Odom. He spent much of the rest of that season with the Triple-A Richmond Braves, coming to bat for Atlanta ten times, with one hit, a single.

All told, in 69 MLB games played, Varney batted .247, with seven doubles and one triple, along with his five homers.

Pete Varney retired from professional baseball after the 1977 minor league season. After three years of high school coaching in Templeton, Massachusetts, he became head baseball coach at Brandeis University. In 34 years as head coach of the Brandeis Judges he compiled a win–loss record of 705–528 (with six ties), and became the winningest Brandeis coach in any varsity sport. From 1988 to 1990, he skippered the Cotuit Kettleers, a collegiate summer baseball team in the Cape Cod Baseball League. He announced his retirement effective June 30, 2015.

== See also ==
- Chicago White Sox all-time roster
- Harvard Beats Yale 29-29
