= Life Study =

A life study is a work of art showing a human figure, often made in a life class. it may also refer to:

- Life Study (film), a 1973 romance film
