= Duane Ford =

American football coach (born c. 1955)

Biographical details
- Born: c. 1955 or 1956 (age 70–71); Rumney, New Hampshire, U.S.
- Education: Middlebury College (1978)

Playing career

Football
- 1974–1977: Middlebury

Lacrosse
- 1974–1977: Middlebury
- Position: Linebacker (football)

Coaching career (HC unless noted)

Football
- 1978–1981: Middlebury (DL)
- 1982–1984: Tufts (DC)
- 1985–1993: Tufts
- 1994–after 1997: Holderness School (NH) (assistant)

Lacrosse
- 1983–1986: Tufts

Head coaching record
- Overall: 39–30–3 (football); 23–22 (lacrosse)

Accomplishments and honors

Championships
- 1 NESCAC (1986)

Awards
- As player First-Team All-New England (1977); As coach NESCAC Coach of the Year (1986)

Duane Ford (born c. 1955 or 1956) is an American former college football coach. He was the head football coach for Tufts University from 1985 to 1993, compiling a record of 39–30–3.

== Playing career ==
Ford was from Rumney, New Hampshire, and attended Holderness School. He played college football and lacrosse for Middlebury College from 1974 to 1977. He was a member of the Middlebury Panthers football team as a linebacker and earned First-Team New England honors his senior year. He was also co-captain that year.

== Coaching career ==
Following Ford's graduation 1978, he joined Middlebury as the team's defensive line coach. In 1982, he was named as the defensive coordinator for Tufts University. Following previous head coach Vic Gatto being hired by Davidson College, Ford was named head football coach for the Tufts Jumbos football team. He led the team to a 7–1 record in 1986 and won the New England Small College Athletic Conference (NESCAC) title and was named NESCAC Coach of the Year. In 1994, Ford resigned from Tufts and became an assistant coach for his alma mater, Holderness School.

From 1983 to 1986, Ford was the head lacrosse coach for Tufts and compiled a career record of 23–22.

== Head coaching record ==
=== Football ===
| Year | Team | Overall | Conference | Standing | Bowl/playoffs |
|---|---|---|---|---|---|
Tufts Jumbos (New England Small College Athletic Conference) (1985–1993)
| 1985 | Tufts | 3–4–1 | 3–4–1 | | |
| 1986 | Tufts | 7–1 | 7–1 | 1st | |
| 1987 | Tufts | 4–4 | 4–4 | | |
| 1988 | Tufts | 4–3–1 | 4–3–1 | | |
| 1989 | Tufts | 6–2 | 6–2 | | |
| 1990 | Tufts | 6–2 | 6–2 | | |
| 1991 | Tufts | 5–3 | 5–3 | | |
| 1992 | Tufts | 3–4–1 | 3–4–1 | | |
| 1993 | Tufts | 1–7 | 1–7 | T–8th | |
| Tufts: | | 39–30–3 | 39–30–3 | | |
| Total: | | 39–30–3 | | | |
National championship Conference title Conference division title or championship game berth
