= Tie (draw) =

Competition finished with identical or inconclusive results

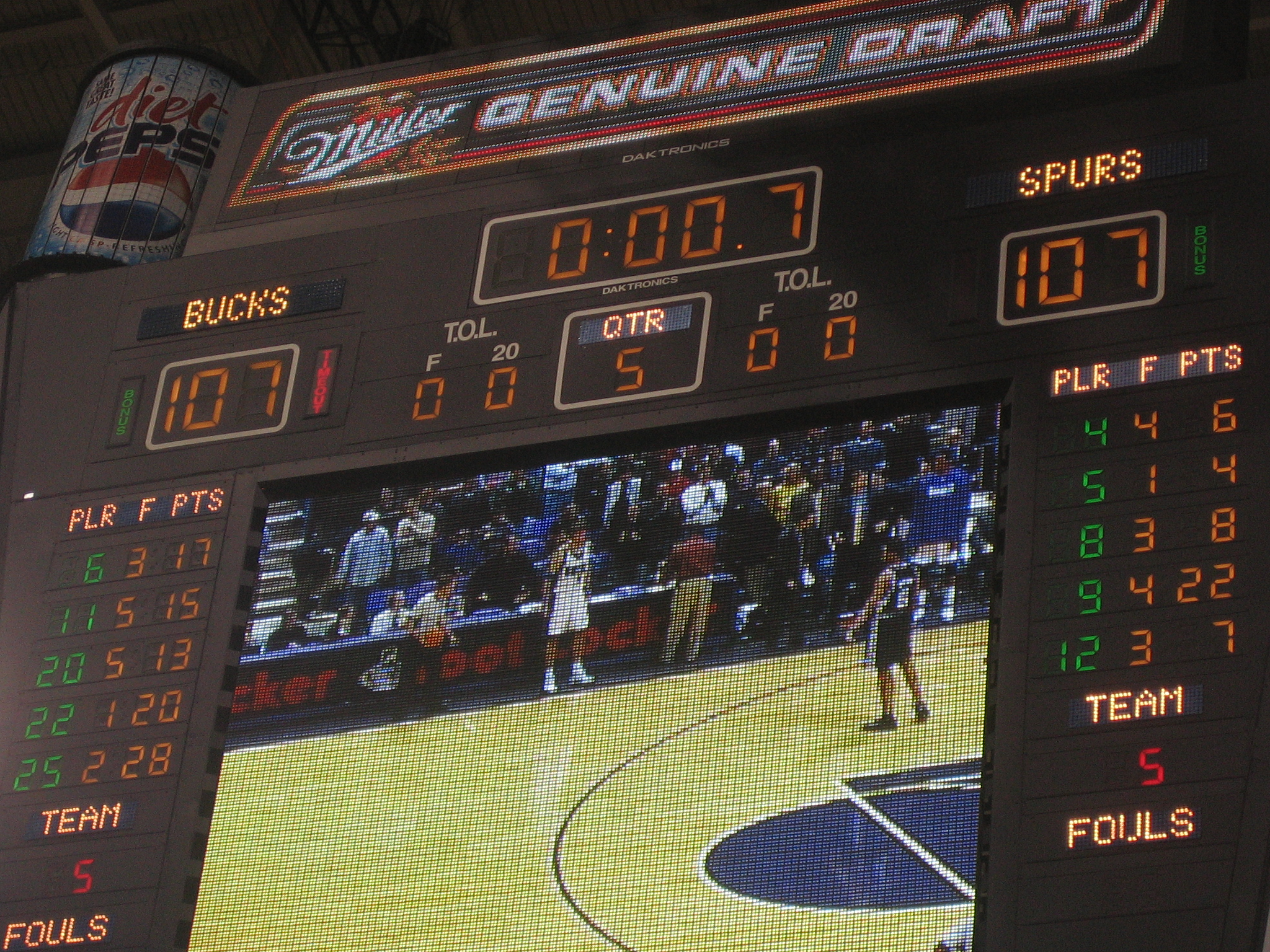

A draw or tie occurs in a competitive sport when the results are identical or inconclusive. Ties or draws are possible in some, but not all, sports and games. Such an outcome, sometimes referred to as deadlock, can also occur in other areas of life such as politics, business, and wherever there are different factions regarding an issue.

== Terminology ==
The word tie is usually used in North America, whereas the word draw is usual elsewhere.

== Resolving ties or draws ==
In instances where a winner must be determined, several methods are commonly used. Across various sports:

- Some other measure may be used, such as aggregate point difference.
- A game may continue on in extra time. To ensure a quick result, some form of sudden death rule may apply.
- In some sports, a penalty shootout or bowl-out may occur.
- A rematch may occur at a later date, especially if a winner must be selected (in a final).
- The result might be decided by chance (e.g. a toss of a coin) when no objective method of determining a result remains.

The rules governing the resolution of drawn matches are rarely uniform across an entire sport, and are usually specified by the rules of the competition.

=== Politics ===
In other areas, such as in a vote, there may be a method to break the tie. Having an odd number of voters is one solution—after the election of the Doge of Venice by a committee of 40 was deadlocked in a tie, the number of electors was increased to 41—but may not always be successful, for example, if a member is absent or abstains, or if there are more than two candidates. In many cases one member of an assembly may by convention not normally vote, but will exercise a casting vote in case of deadlock. Sometimes some method of random choice, such as tossing a coin, may be resorted to, even in a formal vote.

In some legislative bodies, a casting vote can only be exercised according to strict rules or constitutional conventions. For example, the Speaker of the British House of Commons (a position whose functions and conventions of operation inspire similar roles in several other nations using the Westminster system) is expected by convention to follow Speaker Denison's rule (i.e. to vote to allow further discussion, if this is possible, and otherwise to vote in favour of the status quo). This in effect means "Yes/Yea/Aye" on the first and second reading of a bill, "No/Nay" on the third, "Yes/Yea/Aye" on the government's budget, and "No/Nay" on a motion of no confidence.

== Examples of two-player games ==
=== Chess ===
Chess has five ways of ending or achieving a draw from an opponent: stalemate, agreement between the players, the fifty-move rule (and its extension, seventy-five-move rule), threefold repetition (and its extension, fivefold repetition), or neither player having sufficient material to checkmate. At top-level play, roughly half of games end in a draw.

=== Boxing ===
When a match ends with completion of the specified maximum number of rounds, and the judges of the match have awarded an equal number of points to both boxers, or if there are three judges (as is the custom) and one judge awards the fight to one fighter, another awards the fight to the opposing fighter, and the third scores it a draw (split draw), the match is declared a draw. The contest would be scored a draw even if two of three judges score it a draw and the third does not (a majority draw). Draws are relatively rare in boxing: certain scoring systems make it impossible for a judge to award equal points for a match. If a championship bout ends in a draw, the champion usually retains the title.

If there is a draw in a quarterfinal or a semifinal match of a tournament, a tiebreaker round is played instead.

=== Sumo ===
In professional sumo, draws were once common place but are no longer used in any situation. In situations that would have resulted in draws (such as close results, exhaustion, or injury) are currently resolved with immediate rematches, temporary breaks, or forfeiture.

=== Tennis ===
In most professional tennis matches, a tiebreaker rule applies in each set to avoid lengthy matches, as happens quite frequently if the traditional tennis rule for winning a set is followed. When players reach a score of 6–all in a set, instead of continuing the set until one opponent wins with a two-game difference, a special game is played to decide the winner of the set; the winner is the first to reach at least seven points with a difference of two over the opponent. This however did not apply to the final set of matches at the French Open, allowing the total number of games in a match to be virtually unlimited (for example, the final set of the Isner–Mahut match at the 2010 Wimbledon Championships ended only when John Isner beat Nicolas Mahut 70–68). The Australian Open and Wimbledon Championships did not use a final set tiebreaker through the 2018 tournaments, but began to use a tiebreaker from 2019 (For Wimbledon, the final set tiebreaker occurred after 24 games in the final set, from 2019 to 2021).

Since 2022, all Grand Slam tournaments, including the Olympics in 2024, now use 10-point final set tiebreaker games, with a 2-point lead minimum. If the tiebreaker game deciding the match is tied at 9-all, the first to take a 2-point lead will win.

=== Video games ===
In versus-fighting games, a draw occurs when both players end the match through a double KO; or via time over, with the same percentage of life bar. For example, some of these games, such as Street Fighter and Tekken, require two rounds to win the match, and if after a third round the score ends in a 1–1 draw, the players have to fight again in an extra round. If this extra round ends in a draw, the game will end for both players. In Mortal Kombat, if a round ends when the time runs out and both players have complete life bars, the game ends for both players, because due to Mortal Kombat's gameplay (in which every common hit takes block damage) it is virtually impossible for a round to end tied, and that means the players were not playing for real. In the Super Smash Bros. series, if two or more players have equal lives or points at the end of a match, a sudden death period begins with each fighter having 300% damage, essentially making it so a single hit can win the match. This is also true in Virtua Fighter series and X-Men: Children of the Atom. In SNK vs. Capcom: The Match of the Millennium, a draw awards the round to both sides but favours the CPU if it's a decider i.e. the player is still the loser and must restart the stage even though they technically tied.

== Examples of multi-player games ==
=== American football ===
Tied games, which were commonplace in the National Football League (NFL) through the 1960s, had become exceedingly rare with the introduction of sudden death overtime, which first applied to the regular season in 1974. The first game this new rule applied to ended in a tie between the Denver Broncos and Pittsburgh Steelers.

However, modifications to overtime rules within the past ten years have actually made ties somewhat more common. The most recent NFL tied game occurred on October 11, 2026, when a game between the New York Giants and the Washington Commanders ended in a 27-27 tie after overtime.

In the NFL, as of 2025, both teams are required to have at least one possession in overtime in both regular season and postseason games: in the regular season games, the game ends in a tie if the score is still tied after the ten-minute overtime has expired. In postseason, they will keep playing 15-minute quarters until a winner is determined.

Prior to 2025, a team could win in overtime with a touchdown on the first possession. If the team having first possession in overtime scored only a field goal, the other team would receive the ball, and could either tie the game with a field goal resulting in continuation of overtime (which then becomes sudden death), or score a touchdown, thereby winning the game. This modified sudden death rule was instituted during the 2010 playoffs and adopted for the 2012 regular season.

If the overtime period ended with the score tied in the regular season, either because both teams scored field goals on their initial possessions and failed to score again or neither team scored throughout the duration of the overtime period, then the game would end in a tie. Tied games are listed as part of a team's official record, counting in the team's winning percentage as half a win and half a loss. A game ending in a scoreless tie has never occurred since the introduction of overtime.

Ties were at one point so rare in the modern league that after Donovan McNabb and other Philadelphia Eagles players said, when the team and the Cincinnati Bengals tied 13–13 in 2008, that they did not know that a game could end in a tie, Ben Roethlisberger estimated that 50% of players did not know.

After rookie Najee Harris and other players on both teams admitted in 2021, after the Steelers tied the Detroit Lions 16–16, that they had expected the game to continue, NFL.com wrote that since McNabb, "it seems every time a game ends without a victor, at least one player admits he didn't know it was possible".

- In National Collegiate Athletic Association (NCAA) college football, overtime was introduced in 1996, eliminating ties except in the event of severe weather or curfew situations. When a game goes to overtime, each team is given one possession from its opponent's twenty-five-yard line with no game clock, despite the one timeout per period and use of play clock. The team leading after both possessions is declared the winner. If the teams remain tied, the team that started second starts the second overtime. If a team scores a touchdown, it must attempt a two-point conversion. If the teams remain tied after this session, the teams alternate attempting two-point conversions (a single play from the 3 yard line) until the tie is resolved.
  - The unpopularity of ties in American sports is reflected in the saying, "A tie is like kissing your sister." The earliest known use of the phrase was by Navy football coach Eddie Erdelatz after a scoreless tie against Duke in 1953.
  - The 1968 Yale vs. Harvard football game ended in a 29–29 tie, but the Harvard Crimson student newspaper famously printed the headline "Harvard Beats Yale 29–29".
  - 6 October 1990: Kansas and Iowa State end their game in a 34–34 tie, giving KU the all-time NCAA Division I-A record for number of tied games with 57. Illinois State holds the Division I-AA record for ties with 66. Since then, NCAA football games have a tie-breaking rule, so only an extenuating circumstances game suspended on account of weather, or a rule change reinstating ties would allow this record to be broken. The 1995/96 school year was the last to feature non-weather curtailed tied games.
  - NCAA Rule 3-3-3, Suspending the Game, permits tied games by weather or curfew. NCAA rules on inclement weather include policies on lightning, requiring a minimum 30-minute delay upon the first detected lightning strike within 8.1 miles (13 km) of the venue, and each lightning strike detected inside the radius results in an automatic resetting of the clock. If the game is tied when the game is suspended before the end of regulation, a tied game can only be declared if the teams agree to, or the conference declares the game, a draw, because of severe weather conditions, and cannot be continued at a reasonable time (curfew, travel logistics, weather warnings) with the game tied. If the game is tied at the end of regulation, including in the middle of an overtime period when one team has scored and the other team is on the field, and the game is suspended by weather and/or reaches a league-imposed curfew, and it is not a postseason game, the game is ruled a tie. During overtime periods, if one team has scored in their overtime period, but the second team has yet to complete its overtime period when play is terminated because of weather or curfew, as in baseball, the score in the overtime period is wiped out and the game ends in a tie.

=== Association football ===
If both sides have scored an equal number of goals within regulation time (90 minutes), the game is usually counted as a draw. In elimination games, where a winner must be determined to progress to the next stage of the tournament, two periods of extra time are played. If the score continues tied even after this time, the match technically remains a draw; however, a penalty shootout is used to determine which team is to progress to the next stage of the tournament. In some competitions, the extra time may be skipped and the match goes straight to penalties after a drawn 90 minutes.

Some competitions, such as the FA Cup, employ a system of replays where the drawn match is repeated at the ground of the away team in the first game. Although this was a widely used tiebreaker, it fell out of favour after excessive replays caused organisational and practicality issues.

In two-leg, home-and-away fixtures in which a winner must be determined at the end of the second leg, the away goals rule may be employed if teams' aggregate scores over two legs are level; the rule gives victory to whichever team scored more in its respective away leg. Typically the rule may be invoked both to obviate extra time and after extra time to obviate a penalty shootout. All UEFA (European) club competitions used away goals until 2021; by contrast, CONMEBOL (South America) competitions did not use this rule until 2005, but also stopped using it since 2022. Major League Soccer, the Tier One league in the United States and Canada, did not adopt the away goals rule until 2014.

=== Australian rules football ===
Draws in Australian rules football have occurred at an average of two per season (under the current fixture). If a draw occurs during a regular season match, the result stands as a draw, and both teams earn premiership points equivalent to half of a win (two points, or one in South Australian competition).

Traditionally, when a draw occurred during a finals match, the match would be replayed the following week, but the Australian Football League introduced extra time to finals (except for the Grand Final) in 1991, following the logistical difficulties that arose after the 1990 Qualifying Final between Collingwood and West Coast was drawn, later introducing extra time to Grand Finals in 2016.

When used, extra time consists of two halves, each three minutes long (plus time-on), with the team ahead after both periods winning. If the scores are still level when extra time has expired, this process is repeated with additional two three-minute halves being played until a winner is determined.

=== Baseball ===
Ties are relatively rare in baseball, since the practice dating back to the earliest days of the game is to play extra innings until one side has the lead after an equal number of innings played. Nonetheless a game can be called a tie in some situations, usually in a case where one or both teams have used all available pitchers. Games can be called after fifth innings in extenuating circumstances, such as suspension due to bad weather.

For some amateur and international games, tiebreakers are used prompting an earlier conclusion during extra innings: If a tiebreaker is used, after a certain extra innings (usually 3 or 4, determined by organizer before the tournament), the innings will start with the previous two batters loaded.

- In Major League Baseball, a game may end in a tie only due to weather or, historically, darkness (a called game due to darkness is unlikely to happen now that all Major League parks have floodlights; darkness also means reaching the curfew prohibiting innings from starting after 1 am local time). While any game that has reached 5 full innings is statistically official, a tied game does not count in the standings. Before 2007, tied games ended by weather were replayed from the start, but since 2007, the games are continued from where they left off and therefore do not remain as ties once completed. A tied game suspended by weather may also stand as the final result if the two teams are not scheduled to play again for the remainder of the year, and the game does not affect playoff implications; a recent example occurred on 29 September 2016, between the Chicago Cubs and the Pittsburgh Pirates.
  - The 2002 All-Star Game was declared a tie after eleven innings, due to a lack of pitchers; this decision was considered controversial, and from the following season through 2016, MLB awarded home field advantage in the World Series to the league that won the game to prevent such a situation.
- In Japan, a game in regular season play could last no more than 4 hours, 30 minutes, or for night games (especially in the Pacific League), 3 hours, 30 minutes for transportation reasons. By 1987, the rule was changed to a limit of three extra innings for a total of 12 innings, where the game is declared a tie if the score is even after the limit is reached. The rule was adopted for interleague and Climax Series (the postseason three-team stepladder playoff to determine the team playing in the Japan Series) when they were adopted. In regular season play, ties do not count against a team, however, and are "discarded" for purposes of winning percentage. If teams are tied in the won-loss percentage at the end of the season, the team with the better head-to-head record wins the tiebreaker. If a tie occurred in the Climax Series (tied series in the first round or 2–3–1 with the first-place team winning two games, the team winning the first round winning three, and one game is tied), the team with better standing in that regular season advances.
  - During the Japan Series, prior to 1986, the rule was four hours, 30 minutes from the start of the first pitch.
  - Starting in 1987, the rule changed from time to innings.
    - From 1987 to 1993, up to nine extra innings could be played, for a limit of 18 innings in the first seven games.
    - From 1994 until 2017, up to six extra innings could be played, for a limit of 15 innings in the first seven games.
    - Since 2018, the postseason rule is the same as the regular season, thus Game 1 between the Hiroshima Carp and the Fukuoka SoftBank Hawks ended in a 2-2 12 inning draw.
    - Since 2021, if further games (Game 8, et al.) are tied after 12 innings, the WBSC baseball tiebreaker of runners on first and second base will be used to start the 13th inning.
  - If no team has won the series after seven games, all subsequent games starting with game eight will be played until there is a winner.
  - During the 2011 season and 2012 regular season, the 2011 Tohoku earthquake and tsunami resulted in special rule changes for energy conservation. All night games had a 3-hour, 30-minute limit (similar to the Pacific League), and no extra innings were played. If a game was tied at the time limit or after the 9th inning, game ended in a tie. The rule did not apply to the 2011 Japan Series, and was later lifted before the beginning of the 2012 Climax Series.
  - NPB's All-star games do not include extra innings. Therefore, a tie will be declared if 9 innings have been played if neither side is leading.
- In Taiwan's CPBL, the same rule as NPB applies in the regular season. In the Taiwan Series, there is no limit to the number of innings in a game, but any game that has reached official game status and is tied when a game is called because of weather is an official tied game. (Amended in 2011).
- In NCAA college baseball, a conference will declare a game may be tied in extenuating circumstances, usually in the final game of a series only, or in non-conference midweek games:
  - The game reaches curfew time, to allow the visiting team to travel home for classes the next day. Often, the curfew time will be early, forcing the game to be started early. In the Southeastern Conference, for example, the visiting team shall post travel details and a designated departure time to the home team prior to the start of the season, with no game starting later than 1 pm local time if a team is using commercial air travel. No half-inning may start within 15 minutes of the designated departure time. All rules for inclement weather in official games after the sixth inning are in effect.
  - Once an inning begins, if the visiting team has scored at least one run to tie or take the lead, but the home team has not finished its turn to bat in the inning, the entire inning can be wiped off and the game score reverted to the end of the previous full inning.
  - In an extra inning, this will result in a tie game being declared.
    - However, if a game starts late, and the trailing team is at bat at the 15-minute point, and ties or takes the lead during that point, the game can be declared a tie. The trailing team cannot win the game until the entire inning in question has been completed.
- Many amateur baseball leagues include tied games in the standing if an official game is called for darkness or rain with a tie score. Ofttimes a point system is used for standings, with two points being awarded for a win, and one for a tie.
- For Japanese's High-School level baseball, which they are held in form of single-elimination knockout tournaments, prior to a 2018 rule adopting the WBSC tiebreaker, a tie was declared after 15 innings (18 innings before 2001) with a replayed game the next day. Since the 2018 tournament, all games adopted the WBSC tiebreakers in 13th inning with the exception of both Koushien finals: those games can still declare as tie (and rematched) like previous rule, and only during the replayed game will the tiebreaker be in effect starting with the 13th inning.
- In International level games, tiebreaker rule are introduced in the 2008 Beijing Olympics. The finals of the 2009 World Baseball Classic is the first international game using under this rule.

=== Basketball ===
Ties are somewhat rare in basketball due to the high-scoring nature of the game: if the score is tied at the end of regulation, the rules provide that as many extra periods as necessary will be played until one side has a higher score. The only exception is during a two-legged tie. No overtime is played if the first leg if tied. In the second leg, overtime is played only if the aggregate is tied.

=== Cricket ===
Cricket distinguishes between a tie and a draw, which are two possible results of a game:

- A tie is the identical result that occurs when each team has scored the same total number of runs after their allotted innings, all innings being completed. This is very rare in Test cricket and has happened only twice in its long history, but they are slightly more commonplace in first-class and limited-overs matches. In some forms of one-day cricket, such as Twenty20, a Super Over or a bowl-out is used as a tiebreaker to decide a result that would otherwise be a tie. See this list of tied games.
- A draw is the inconclusive result that occurs when the allotted playing time for the game expires without the teams having completed their innings. This is relatively common, occurring in 20–30% of Test Matches. A team with little hope of victory will try to play out the remaining time and cause a draw. The principal purpose of a declaration is for a team who are leading to avoid consuming time and increasing the chances of a draw. Limited-overs matches cannot be drawn, although they can end with a no result if abandoned because of weather or other factors.

=== Ice hockey ===
If the score is even after three periods, the game may end in a tie, or overtime may be played. In most North American professional leagues, the regular-season tie-breaker is five minutes long, with each side playing at least one man short. Starting with the 2015–16 NHL season, the National Hockey League went from playing one man short to two men short in overtime. Should a team have two players penalised during the overtime, the team on the power play will play with a fifth player. In the Southern Professional Hockey League, each side plays only three players, with a minor penalty in the first three minutes resulting in a team on the power play earning an extra man; a minor penalty in the final two minutes, or a major penalty, results in the awarding of a penalty shot. A goal wins the game in sudden death; otherwise, a shootout will occur, with three players participating for each side. If the score is still tied, the shootout will go into sudden death. In North American minor leagues, the same procedure is used except shootouts are five players. In each case, the winner of the shootout is awarded credit for a regulation win (two points), and the loser of the overtime is marked with an overtime loss (OTL) and receives credit equal to half of one win (one point). In the National Hockey League, shootout wins are still counted as two points, but for breaking a tie in terms of points at the end of the season, the team with more regulation and overtime wins (ROW) takes the higher position in the standings. The Swedish Hockey League (SHL) uses a 3–2–1–0 point system in the regular season, where a regulation win is worth three points, a win in the five-minute sudden death overtime period or a shootout win two points, and an overtime loss as well as a shootout loss one point in the standings.

In the National Hockey League, in the playoffs, in general unlimited 20-minute sudden death periods are played, making a tie impossible. An exception occurred during the 1988 Finals, when a power failure forced the early abandonment of Game 4 between the Boston Bruins and the Edmonton Oilers with the score tied 3–3. The game was later replayed in its entirety, with the Oilers winning and sweeping the Finals except for the one shortened tied game.

=== Tournament poker ===
Ties rarely occur, since multiple simultaneous player eliminations will rank the eliminated players by chip counts. However, if two or more players are eliminated in one hand, and both players started the hand with identical chip counts, the players will be tied in official rankings. It is impossible for poker tournaments to end in a tie (since one player must end up with all the chips), though multiple players may be tied for second (or lower) place.

=== Racing sports ===
In racing sports, if competitors appear to finish simultaneously and no technology (such as a photo finish) can separate them, this is considered a "dead heat" and in most cases the competitors tie for the place.

==== Horse racing ====
The term "dead heat" originally came from when horse racing from when horses used to race in matches consisting of multiple heats, rather than single races, with the total number of wins for horses determining winner of the match. When the judges could not determine the first horse over the finish line, the heat was declared "dead", and did not count. If there is a dead heat, wagers are paid on all winning horses, but against half the original stake (or one-third if there were three tied horses, and so on). See List of dead heat horse races.

==== Motorsport ====
Ties in motor racing almost never occur, even though sometimes they are intentional. With three Ford GT40 leading at the end of the 1966 24 Hours of Le Mans, the two leading cars which were in the same lap were supposed to finish in a dead heat, but because they started at different positions, the car that covered more distance was proclaimed winner. Ferrari staged a 1-2-3 photo finish in the banked oval at the 1967 24 Hours of Daytona, but the cars actually were laps apart. After the death of Ferrari driver Lorenzo Bandini a few days earlier, his two team mates dominated the non-championship 1967 Syracuse Grand Prix in Sicily and won in an actual dead heat.

Nearly all modern racing cars and motorcycles carry electronic transponders which relay precise timing information down to the thousandths of a second. However, a photo-finish camera is used at the finish line, and if the two vehicles cross the line together, the position may be declared a tie. The 1974 Firecracker 400 is the only case in modern NASCAR history where a tie has occurred in a position; Cale Yarborough and Buddy Baker tied for third after 160 laps. At the 2002 United States Formula One Grand Prix, Ferrari's Michael Schumacher attempted to stage a dead heat with teammate Rubens Barrichello but "failed by a little" as Schumacher said, finishing 0.011 seconds behind Barrichello. The F1 Sporting Regulations provide that in the event of a dead heat in a race, points and prizes will be added together and shared equally among the tying drivers.

In Grand Prix motorcycle racing, dead heats are avoided by fastest lap times being a tiebreaking measure. This rule resulted in Héctor Faubel winning the 125cc classification of the 2011 German motorcycle Grand Prix after a photo finish could not separate him and Johann Zarco.

=== Rugby league ===
In the premier Australasian rugby league competition, the National Rugby League, draws are possible but first are subject to golden point overtime. Golden point also applies to the State of Origin series and Four Nations matches. In rugby league in the United Kingdom, draws can also occur, as in league games, if the score of both teams remain level by the end of 80 minutes play, the game ends a draw, and each team is awarded one point in the league rather than two for a win.

=== Rugby union ===
Draws are uncommon in rugby union due to the variety of different ways to score and different values for each type of score. Draws are allowed to stand in league play. In the knockout stages of the Rugby World Cup, two 10-minute periods of extra time are played. If there is still no winner, a 10-minute period of sudden death is played where any score wins the game. Should the result still be tied a place-kicking competition is held where 5 players from each side take one kick each from anywhere on the 22-metre line (usually straight in front of the posts). The semi-final of the Heineken Cup between Cardiff Blues and Leicester Tigers at the Millennium Stadium was decided by a "kick-off". After five kicks per team, the scores were level at 4–4 after Johne Murphy (Leicester) and Tom James (Cardiff) had missed their kicks. Moving now to sudden death, the score continued to 6–6 but, after Martyn Williams pulled his kick wide, Leicester number eight Jordan Crane scored to send Leicester Tigers to the Heineken Cup Final in Edinburgh. In certain knockout competitions, if the scores are drawn after 80 minutes, the teams that have scored the most tries are considered the victors. However, if the number of tries scored are equal, the teams proceed to play overtime.

== See also ==
- Weak ordering, a mathematical formulation of a ranking that allows ties (such as in the outcome of a horse race)

== Notes ==
1.In most tournament settings, sudden death is not used for breaking ties, with most rulesets awarding the game to the player with more lives, or whoever has taken less damage if they have the same amount of lives.
