= Bob Halloran (CBS sportscaster) =

American sportscaster (1934–2022)

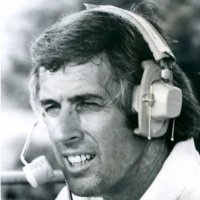
- Born: April 19, 1934; New Bedford, Massachusetts
- Died: January 2, 2022 (aged 87); Rancho Mirage, California
- Education: Holy Family High School, New Bedford; University of Miami
- Occupation: Sportscaster
- Years active: 1962–2012
- Spouse: Sandra

Bob Halloran (April 19, 1934 – January 2, 2022) was an American sportscaster with CBS Sports in New York who was later an executive with MGM Mirage. He was known in the world of sports for his involvement in golf and boxing, as well as sporting events in Las Vegas.

== Early life ==
Halloran was born in New Bedford, Massachusetts, and he attended Holy Family High School, where he was on the golf team. He served in the U.S. Army and then attended the University of Miami on a golf scholarship, graduating in 1962.

== Career ==
Halloran began a career in broadcasting with CBS 4 in Miami in 1962. Having been an intern as a student, he joined the station on graduation. He worked in various roles but quickly became a sports reporter covering local sporting events in Miami. In the mid-1960s he was promoted to the role of sportscaster, appearing on the evening's news program covering all aspects of sports.

In 1970, CBS Sports in New York hired Halloran as a national correspondent, where he covered a variety of sporting events, including boxing and golf, such as coverage of the Masters Tournament. He was a frequent interviewer of Muhammad Ali, whom he had met in Miami when still known as Cassius Clay.

Halloran moved from television to join Caesar's World in 1978 as vice president of sports. He organized events with Marvin Hagler and Roberto Durán.

In 1988, Halloran was hired by Steve Wynn as vice president of sports for Mirage Resorts. He was later named president of sports for Mirage Resorts. In the 1990s, he challenged the producer of the televised golf event, the Skins Game, winning a settlement that acknowledged his role creating the event.

In 2002, he was appointed director of sports for MGM Mirage by CEO Terri Lanni. From 2002 to 2012, he produced major events including the "heavyweight" match between Oscar De La Hoya and Floyd Mayweather and match between Manny Pacquiao and Juan Marquez, and represented MGM Grand during press tours for key events.

He left MGM Mirage in 2012 to work as a sports consultant and produced events at the MGM Beau Rivage until 2016. In 2012, Halloran was inducted into Florida's Boxing Hall of Fame.

== Personal life and death ==
Halloran was married to Sandra Halloran. He was a long-standing member of the Bel-Air Country Club and volunteered his time to organize the Cap Cure charity golf tournaments for many years. He came in second place in the 2005 AT&T Pebble Beach tournament. He resided in Rancho Mirage, California.

Halloran died at his residence in Rancho Mirage, on January 2, 2022, at the age of 87.
