= Frank Champi =

American football player (born 1948)

No. 27
- Position: Quarterback

Personal information
- Born: Everett, Massachusetts, U.S.
- Listed height: 5 ft 11 in (1.80 m)
- Listed weight: 195 lb (88 kg)

Career information
- High school: Everett (MA)
- College: Harvard (1966–1969)

Frank Champi (born 1948) is an American former football quarterback who played college football at Harvard University. He is best known for entering the 1968 season finale against Yale University halfway through the second quarter, with the team losing 0-22 and leading a stunning comeback that scored 16 points in the final 42 seconds, while saving the school's undefeated season with a 29–29 tie.

== Early life ==
Champi attended Everett High School. As a junior, he was named the starter at quarterback. Although he originally committed verbally to Princeton University, he opted to enroll at Harvard University instead, after Crimson quarterback Bobby Leo got involved in the recruiting effort.

== College career ==
As a freshman in 1966, he played football on the junior varsity team. As a sophomore in 1967, he was the fourth-string quarterback on the team. He also competed in the javelin throw.

As a junior in 1968, he was the backup quarterback behind senior George Lalich. In the season finale Harvard was unbeaten, but faced the Yale University team that was undefeated, nationally ranked at 16th and heavily favored. About halfway through the second quarter, with Yale leading 22-0 and threatening to run away with the game, head coach John Yovicsin decided to substitute Lalich with Champi, who managed to lead the team to a 64-yard touchdown drive before halftime. Yovicsin returned Champi to the bench at the start of the second half, then reinserted him for the rest of the contest after a lackluster three play series by Lalich. Trailing 29–13 with 42 seconds remaining, he rallied the team to score 16 points. As a result, both schools shared the Ivy League title and inspired the Harvard Crimson the next day to print the headline, "Harvard Beats Yale, 29-29". He finished the season with 11-of-27 completions (40.7%) for 128 yards, 4 touchdowns and no interceptions.

As a senior in 1969, although he was named the starter at quarterback, he was being alternated with senior Dave Smith. He decided to leave the football team after the second game of the season against Boston University. He posted 7-of-18 completions (38.9%) for 83 yards and no touchdowns. The team struggled with the quarterback play the rest of the year, falling to a fifth-place tie with a 3–6 record. He returned to practicing track and the javelin throw.

== Personal life ==
In 1969, he appeared on The Dating Game with former Yale quarterback Brian Dowling. After college, Champi returned to Everett High School as a football backfield coach and teacher. He also enrolled in the Harvard Graduate School of Education and obtained a Master of Arts in Teaching.

He later coached and taught at Everett, Lunenburg High School and Melrose High School. He ultimately was hired as a Senior Applications Engineer at Mitsubishi in the early 1980s.
