= Marty Domres =

American football player (1947–2025)

- Domres in 1975

No. 14, 10
- Position: Quarterback

Personal information
- Born: April 17, 1947; Ithaca, New York, U.S.
- Died: October 13, 2025 (aged 78); Baltimore, Maryland, U.S.
- Listed height: 6 ft 4 in (1.93 m)
- Listed weight: 220 lb (100 kg)

Career information
- High school: Christian Brothers Academy (DeWitt, New York)
- College: Columbia
- NFL draft: 1969: 1st round, 9th overall pick

Career history
- San Diego Chargers (1969–1971); Baltimore Colts (1972–1975); San Francisco 49ers (1976); New York Jets (1977)

Awards and highlights
- Second-team All-Eastern (1968)

Career NFL/AFL statistics
- Passing attempts: 809
- Passing completions: 399
- Completion percentage: 49.3%
- TD–INT: 27–50
- Passing yards: 4,904
- Passer rating: 53.8
- Rushing yards: 679
- Rushing touchdowns: 10
- Stats at Pro Football Reference

Martin Francis Domres (/ˈdɒmrɛs/ DOM-rehs; April 17, 1947 – October 13, 2025) was an American professional football player who was a quarterback for nine seasons in the American Football League (AFL) and National Football League (NFL). He played college football for the Columbia Lions and was selected by the San Diego Chargers in the first round of the 1969 NFL/AFL draft. Domres played in the AFL and NFL with the San Diego Chargers, Baltimore Colts, San Francisco 49ers, and the New York Jets.

== Early life ==
Marty Domres was born in Ithaca, New York, on April 17, 1947. He and his family moved to Binghamton, New York, before settling in Syracuse, New York, where he attended Christian Brothers Academy. Domres played baseball, basketball, and football at Christian Brothers. Domres received several football scholarship offers, but chose to attend Columbia University in New York City.

== College career ==
At Columbia, Domres joined a football team in the midst of a down period. Despite his record-breaking play the Lions went 2–7 in each of Domres' seasons. In 1966, he made his first start at quarterback as a sophomore against Ivy League opponents Yale. Domres set an Ivy League passing record in the game with 326 passing yards and went 18 for 31 with three touchdowns. However, his performance was overshadowed by the 44–21 loss and Yale's Pete Doherty throwing for five touchdowns.

In 1967, Domres earned All-Eastern Honorable Mention and set Columbia school records in total offensive yards (1,752), number of plays on offense (404), and total pass completions (121). He finished seventh overall in offensive yards and eighth overall in completions in NCAA Division I. His stats for the season were 121 completions on 229 attempts for 1,378 yards.

As a senior in 1968, Domres led the Ivy League in passing yards with 1,868 and finished his collegiate career as the league's career passing yards leader with 4,492 yards from 1966–1968. He was named to the 1968 All-Eastern Second Team and was seen as one of the top quarterbacks available in that year's professional draft.

== Professional career ==
=== San Diego Chargers (1969–1971) ===
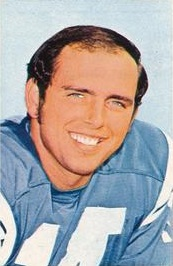
Domres c. 1971

Domres was drafted with the ninth overall selection in the first round of the 1969 NFL/AFL draft by the San Diego Chargers of the AFL. He was the second quarterback taken in the draft after the Cincinnati Bengals selected Greg Cook fifth overall.

In his lone season in the AFL with San Diego, Domres served as the backup to established quarterback John Hadl. Domres replaced Hadl in fourth quarter the opening game of the season, a 27–9 loss to the Kansas City Chiefs, where he completed six of 14 passes. Domres earned his first professional start in a rematch with the Chiefs later that season after Hadl went down with an arm injury. He and the Chargers lost 27–3, with Domres throwing five interceptions. He earned a second career start two weeks later, winning 45–24 against the Denver Broncos. Domres threw his first career touchdown, going 11–20 on passes with 235 yards and one touchdown. He split time with Hadl the rest of the season, and the Chargers missed the AFL playoffs with an 8–6 record.

In 1970, the AFL–NFL merger became official and the Chargers joined the newly formed American Football Conference in the NFL. Domres continued to backup Hadl, and in two starts he went 28–55 with 491 yards and two touchdowns. The Chargers went 5–6–3 and again missed the playoffs. The following season Domres appeared in only four games, with no starts, and threw one touchdown.

=== Baltimore Colts (1972–1975) ===
With limited playing time behind Hadl, Domres requested a trade and was acquired by the Baltimore Colts for John Andrews and a 1973 first-round pick (25th overall–Johnny Rodgers) on August 7, 1972.

Domres replaced Johnny Unitas as the Colts' starting quarterback beginning in week six of the 1972 season. Head coach Don McCafferty was replaced by John Sandusky after he refused general manager Joe Thomas's order to bench the veterans in favor of the younger players. Domres compiled his best professional season in 1972. He started nine games and went 115–222 with 1,392 passing yards and 11 touchdown passes, adding 30 rushes for 137 yards and one touchdown. Domres left the week 12 game of the 1972 season against the Buffalo Bills, appearing to be injured, but later claimed it was to allow Unitas to make his final appearance as a Colt. Unitas threw a 63-yard touchdown pass to Eddie Hinton, his final scoring throw with the team. The Colts won 35–7, and despite Unitas's brief return, Domres was named the NFL Offensive Player of the Week with three passing touchdowns and one rushing touchdown in the game.

Baltimore drafted Bert Jones in the first round of the 1973 NFL draft, leading to an off-season quarterback controversy. Jones was named the starter for the season opener against the Cleveland Browns and remained at the helm for the first four weeks of the season. After a poor start, Colts' head coach Howard Schnellenberger made the switch to Domres, who led the team for the remainder of the season. The Colts finished 4–10 on the season, and Domres went 93–191 with 1,153 yards and nine touchdowns.

Domres spent the next two seasons as the backup to Jones.

=== San Francisco 49ers (1976) ===
In the weeks before the 1976 season began, the Colts traded Domres to the San Francisco 49ers for a 1978 draft choice (which became Ernie Hughes). In San Francisco, Domres served as the third-string quarterback behind Jim Plunkett and Scott Bull.

Joe Thomas, the former Colts general manager who had traded away Domres, took over in the same role for the 49ers prior to the 1977 season. Thomas cut Domres from the 49ers roster in June 1977.

=== New York Jets (1977) ===
Domres signed with the New York Jets on July 8, 1977. He played with the Jets for one season where he served as the back up to Richard Todd.

== Personal life and death ==
Domres settled in the Baltimore, Maryland, area after his NFL career where he became a financial advisor. Despite playing together for only one year, he maintained a close relationship with Unitas until Unitas's death in 2002.

Domres was inducted into the Greater Syracuse Sports Hall of Fame in 1995 and the Christian Brothers Academy LaSallian Athletic Hall of Fame in 2004. He was inducted into the Columbia University Athletic Hall of Fame in 2008.

Domres died on October 13, 2025, at the age of 78.

== NFL career statistics ==
Legend
**Bold**	Career high

Year	Team	Games			Passing								Rushing			
Year	Team	GP	GS	Record	Cmp	Att	Pct	Yds	Avg	TD	Int	Rtg	Att	Yds	Avg	TD
1969	SDG	10	4	3–1	47	112	42.0	631	13.4	2	10	29.3	19	**145**	7.6	**4**
1970	SDG	8	2	1–1	28	55	50.9	491	**17.5**	2	4	63.5	14	39	2.8	0
1971	SDG	4	0	–	7	12	58.3	97	13.9	1	3	72.6	1	0	0.0	0
1972	BAL	12	**9**	**4–5**	**115**	**222**	51.8	**1,392**	12.1	**11**	6	76.6	30	137	4.6	1
1973	BAL	11	**9**	3–6	93	191	48.7	1,153	12.4	9	**13**	55.2	**32**	126	3.9	2
1974	BAL	**14**	6	1–5	77	153	50.3	803	10.4	0	12	33.2	22	**145**	6.6	2
1975	BAL	14	0	–	8	10	**80.0**	123	15.4	1	0	**151.2**	4	46	**11.5**	1
1976	SFO	5	0	–	7	14	50.0	101	14.4	0	1	44.0	4	18	4.5	0
1977	NYJ	12	2	0–2	17	40	42.5	113	6.6	1	1	47.9	4	23	5.8	0
Career		90	32	12–20	399	809	49.3	4,904	12.3	27	50	53.8	130	679	5.2	10

== See also ==
- List of American Football League players
