= Brian Dowling (American football) =

American football player (born 1947)

No. 14, 10, 12
- Position: Quarterback

Personal information
- Born: April 1, 1947 (age 79); Cleveland, Ohio, U.S.
- Listed height: 6 ft 2 in (1.88 m)
- Listed weight: 210 lb (95 kg)

Career information
- High school: St. Ignatius (Cleveland)
- College: Yale (1965-1968)
- NFL draft: 1969: 11th round, 277th overall pick

Career history
- Minnesota Vikings (1969)*; Bridgeport Jets (1969); New England Patriots (1970–1973); Charlotte Hornets (1974–1975); Toronto Argonauts (1976)*; Washington Redskins (1977)*; Green Bay Packers (1977); Los Angeles Rams (1978)*
- * Offseason or practice squad member only

Awards and highlights
- Third-team All-American (1968); 2× First-team All-East (1967, 1968); 2× All-Ivy (1967, 1968); Nils V. "Swede" Nelson Award (1967)

Career NFL statistics
- Passing attempts: 55
- Passing completions: 29
- Completion percentage: 52.7%
- TD–INT: 2–1
- Passing yards: 383
- Passer rating: 79.6
- Stats at Pro Football Reference

Brian John Dowling (born April 1, 1947) is an American former professional football player who was a quarterback in the National Football League (NFL) for the New England Patriots and Green Bay Packers. He also was a member of the Charlotte Hornets in the World Football League (WFL). He played college football for the Yale Bulldogs.

== Early life ==
Dowling attended St. Ignatius High School, located in Cleveland, Ohio, where he was a multi-sport standout.

As a junior in 1963, he led the team to the City Championship Charity Game, where they lost 30-16 to Benedictine High School, after a broken collarbone and a bruised kidney forced Dowling to go to the hospital at halftime and miss the rest of the game. It would be the only game his teams would lose in his high school football career. As a senior in 1964, he avenged that loss against Benedictine in the same City Championship Charity Game in a 48–6 rout, passing for 4 touchdowns and running for a 71-yard score. His teams finished with a 36–1 record.

In basketball, he led the team to a City title by making four free throws in the championship game's last 34 seconds to help turn a 13-point deficit into a 53–50 victory. In tennis, he made the state doubles finals as a sophomore and the regional singles finals as a senior. He also practiced baseball.

In 2001, he was inducted into the Cleveland Sports Hall of Fame.

== College career ==
Although he had multiple NCAA Division I scholarship offers and nearly decided to attend the University of Southern California, his father convinced him to enroll at Yale University and also paid his full tuition. As a freshman, he led the junior varsity team (Yale Bulldogs) to a 6–0 record. He also averaged 24.5 points per game in basketball and competed in tennis.

As a sophomore, he was named the starter at quarterback. He suffered a season-ending knee injury in the first quarter of the second game against Rutgers University. He finished with 12-of-22 completions (54.5%) for 89 yards, 10 carries for 51 yards and 2 passing touchdowns. He was replaced by Pete Doherty.

As a junior, he suffered a broken right wrist in a preseason practice and missed the first 3 games. He was reinserted as the starter in the fourth game against Columbia University. He led the team to an Ivy League championship, which included a 24-20 come-from-behind victory over Harvard University, with a 66-yard touchdown pass in the last 2:16 minutes of the game. He registered 44-of-98 completions (44.9%) for 684 yards, 46 carries for 226 yards, 9 passing touchdowns, 4 rushing touchdowns, one receiving touchdown (a 60-yard reception) and 10 interceptions.

As a senior, he set school single-season passing marks with 92-of-160 completions (57.5%) for 1,554 yards, 82 carries for 313 yards, 19 passing touchdowns, 6 rushing touchdowns, one receiving touchdown (a 30-yard reception) and 10 interceptions. In his final collegiate game, his 1968 Yale team was undefeated, nationally ranked and heavily favored going into The Game against Harvard University at Cambridge. Although likewise unbeaten and untied, the Crimson were unheralded. Harvard, trailing 29–13 with 42 seconds remaining, rallied to tie the game, while Dowling stood helplessly on the sideline. As a result, both schools shared the Ivy League title and inspired the Harvard Crimson the next day to print the headline, "Harvard Beats Yale, 29-29". Dowling ranked ninth in the Heisman Trophy voting, with the fourth-most first-place votes.

He finished his college career with a 16-1-1 record and two Ivy League titles. The 14–17 loss came in the Rutgers game he couldn't finish because of injury as a sophomore.

== Professional career ==
Dowling was selected by the Minnesota Vikings in the 11th round (277th overall) of the 1969 NFL draft. He was tried at three different positions (mostly at running back) during training camp. He was waived on September 6. After being cut, he played for the Bridgeport Jets of the Atlantic Coast Football League.

On February 9, 1970, he was signed by the New England Patriots. He spent two seasons on the practice squad. In 1972, he was the backup behind Jim Plunkett, playing enough to complete 29 of 54 passes (53.7%) for 2 touchdowns and one interception. In 1973, he remained as a reserve player behind Plunkett and didn't record any stats. He was released on August 14, 1974.

On June 28, 1974, he was signed by the New York Stars of the World Football League, becoming one of the first NFL players to join the new league. After the thirteenth game of the season, the team was relocated and renamed as the Charlotte Hornets. He was the third-string quarterback behind Tom Sherman and Gary Danielson. He registered 14-of-38 completions (36.8%) for 140 yards, one touchdown and 5 interceptions.

In 1975, he was the backup behind Sherman, tallying 30-of-55 completions (54.5%) for 383 yards, one touchdown and 6 interceptions. The league ceased operations 12 weeks into the regular season on October 22.

On February 12, 1976, he was signed by the Toronto Argonauts of the Canadian Football League. He was released on July 12.

On April 11, 1977, he was signed as a free agent by the Washington Redskins. On September 9, he was released after the team opted to keep only 2 quarterbacks. On November 14, he was signed by the Green Bay Packers to provide depth after starter Lynn Dickey suffered a broken leg. He was cut on July 5, 1978.

On July 10, 1978, he was signed by the Los Angeles Rams, reuniting with George Allen who was also his head coach with the Redskins. He was released on August 22.

== Personal life ==
Dowling was a member of the Delta Kappa Epsilon fraternity and the Skull and Bones Society. The character B.D., in the Doonesbury comic strip, was originally based on and named after Dowling, a Yale classmate of cartoonist Garry Trudeau. In 1969, he appeared on The Dating Game television show with former Harvard quarterback Frank Champi.

He was involved with the Ivy Satellite Network, which specialized in closed-circuit telecasts of sport games between smaller colleges. In 1983, he was hired as the director of sports marketing at Boston University. Dowling was an insurance industry consultant and worked with a venture capitalist in the Boston area.

== See also ==
- List of NCAA major college football yearly passing leaders
