= 1968 All-East football team =

American college football all-star team

The 1968 All-East football team consists of American football players chosen by various selectors as the best players at each position among the Eastern colleges and universities during the 1968 NCAA University Division football season.

The undefeated 1968 Penn State Nittany Lions football team was ranked No. 2 in the final AP Poll and placed five players on the All-Eastern first team.

Four players were unanimous choices by the Associated Press: end Ted Kwalick and linebacker Dennis Onkotz of Penn State; and fullback Charley Jarvis and linebacker Ken Johnson of Army.

== Offense ==
=== Quarterback ===
- Brian Dowling, Yale (AP-1)
- Marty Domres, Columbia (AP-2)

=== Halfbacks ===
- Charlie Pittman, Penn State (AP-1)
- Calvin Hill, Yale (AP-1)
- Bryant Mitchell, Rutgers (AP-2)
- Dave Bennett, Boston College (AP-2)
- Ken Rutkowski, Buffalo (AP-2)
- Vic Gatto, Harvard (AP-2)

=== Fullback ===
- Charley Jarvis, Army (AP-1)

=== Ends ===
- Ted Kwalick, Penn State (AP-1)
- Bob Neary, Holy Cross (AP-1)
- Gary Steele, Army (AP-2)
- Tom Boyd, Villanova (AP-2)

=== Tackles ===
- Kyle Gee, Yale (AP-1)
- Bob Bouley, Boston College (AP-1)
- Bruce Eckman, Princeton (AP-2)
- Pete Nagle, Colgate (AP-2)

=== Guards ===
- Tom Jones, Harvard (AP-1)
- Dave Zimmerman, Rutgers (AP-1)
- Tom Jackson, Penn State (AP-2)
- Joe Freschi, Princeton (AP-2)

=== Center ===
- Fred Morris, Yale (AP-1)
- John Egan, Boston College (AP-2)

== Defense ==
=== Ends ===
- Lou Gubitosa, Syracuse (AP-1)
- John Cramer, Harvard (AP-1)
- Mike Lettieri, Navy (AP-2)
- Dick Luecke, Army (AP-2)

=== Tackles ===
- Mike Reid, Penn State (AP-1)
- Steve Smear, Penn State (AP-1)
- Art Thoms, Syracuse (AP-1)
- Steve Yarnell, Army (AP-2)
- Rich Moore, Villanova (AP-2)

=== Middle Guard ===
- Dick Sandler, Princeton (AP-2)

=== Linebackers ===
- Dennis Onkotz, Penn State (AP-1)
- Ken Johnson, Army (AP-1)
- John Emery, Harvard (AP-1)
- Dick Schrumpf, Colgate (AP-2)
- Dick Kroner, Boston College (AP-2)
- Dave Richner, Buffalo (AP-2)

=== Backs ===
- Tony Kyasky, Syracuse (AP-1)
- Jim McCall, Army (AP-1)
- Pat Conway, Harvard (AP-1)
- George Burrell, Penn (AP-2)
- John Pollock, Rutgers (AP-2)
- Cliff Ensley, Syracuse (AP-2)

== Key ==
- AP = Associated Press
- UPI = United Press International

== See also ==
- 1968 College Football All-America Team
