= Ted Kwalick =

American football player (born 1947)

No. 82, 89, 88
- Position: Tight end

Personal information
- Born: April 15, 1947 (age 79); McKees Rocks, Pennsylvania, U.S.
- Listed height: 6 ft 4 in (1.93 m)
- Listed weight: 225 lb (102 kg)

Career information
- High school: McKees Rocks (PA) Montour
- College: Penn State
- NFL draft: 1969: 1st round, 7th overall pick

Career history
- San Francisco 49ers (1969–1974); Philadelphia Bell (1975); Oakland Raiders (1975–1977)

Awards and highlights
- Super Bowl champion (XI); First-team All-Pro (1972); Second-team All-Pro (1971); 3× Pro Bowl (1971–1973); Unanimous All-American (1968); First-team All-American (1967); 2× First-team All-East (1967, 1968)

Career NFL statistics
- Receptions: 168
- Receiving yards: 2,570
- Touchdowns: 23
- Stats at Pro Football Reference
- College Football Hall of Fame

Thaddeus John Kwalick (born April 15, 1947) is an American former professional football player who was a tight end in the National Football League (NFL) and World Football League (WFL). He played for the San Francisco 49ers from 1969 to 1974 and the Oakland Raiders from 1975 to 1977. In 1975, he also played with the Philadelphia Bell of the World Football League. He was an All-Pro once, three times selected to the Pro Bowl, was All-American at Penn State, and was inducted into the College Football Hall of Fame in 1989.

== Early life ==
Kwalick was born in Pittsburgh, Pennsylvania on April 15, 1947, to Thaddeus and Rose Kwalick, and grew up in McKees Rock, Pennsylvania, just a few miles from Pittsburgh. He played high school football at Montour High School for coach Bob Phillips.

He was a three-letter athlete, a high school All- American in football, and was named All-State. He was the Western Pennsylvania Interscholastic Athletic League’s (WPIAL) Most Valuable Player in an all-star game against a team of Texas high school players, catching nine passes and scoring his team's only touchdown. Montour won the WPIAL Class A championships in 1963 and 1964. Kwalick made a key reception in the 1964 game that helped secure Montour's victory.

== College career ==
Kwalik attended Pennsylvania State University (Penn State), playing tight end three years for the Nittany Lions. He was Penn State's first two-time All-American, making first-team All American in 1967 and then being named a unanimous All-American in 1968. He was also fourth in voting for the Heisman Trophy in 1968.

Over his Penn State career, Kwalick caught 86 passes for 1,343 yards and 10 touchdowns, setting school tight end records for yards and touchdowns. He ran 4.6 in the 40-yard dash. He averaged 17.1 yards per catch in 1966 and 1967, and 13 yards per catch in 1968. In 1967, he caught 33 passes for 563 yards and four touchdowns, but 17 receptions came in the first two games, after which he was double- and triple-teamed by opponents.

His longest catch went for 89 yards against the University of Miami Hurricanes in 1968, a year in which he also rushed for 96 yards on 14 end-around attempts with one touchdown. He was rated the top college tight end in the country his senior year. The Nittany Lions were 11–0 in the 1968 season, winning the 1969 Orange Bowl 15–14 over the University of Kansas. Penn State coach Joe Paterno said of Kwalick, "'He's what God had in mind when he made a football player.'"

Kwalick was inducted into the College Football Hall of Fame in 1989.

== Professional career ==
Kwalick was selected by the San Francisco 49ers in the first round (seventh overall) of the 1969 NFL/AFL draft. He was 6 ft 4 in (1.93 m) tall and 225 pounds (102.1 kg). He made the Pro Bowl from 1971 through 1973, years in which he had 52 (second in the NFC), 40 and 47 catches respectively. He was first-team All-Pro in 1972, scoring 9 touchdowns, with an 18.8 yards per catch average. The 49ers won their division each of those years, losing in the NFC Championship Game in 1970 and 1971. From 1969 to 1974 with the 49ers he had 164 receptions for 2,555 yards and 23 touchdowns.

In 1975, Kwalick joined the Philadelphia Bell of the World Football League (WFL), which formed a year earlier. The WFL failed in 1975, and Kwalick then joined the Oakland Raiders, playing there for three years until 1977, when he retired from professional football. Kwalick was a member of the team that won Super Bowl XI, but did not play because of injuries and emergency surgery mid-season.

On October 10, 1971, Kwalik scored the first touchdown in Candlestick Park after it officially opened for NFL football, on a nine-yard pass from John Brodie. The 49ers had played at Kezar Stadium since 1946, and moved to Levi's Stadium in 2014.

In March 1974, he was selected by The Hawaiians in the first round (11th overall) of the WFL Pro Draft. The Hawaiians had signed over 10 NFL players, including Kwalick and Calvin Hill, but traded Kwalick's right before he ever played for the team, and he joined the Philadelphia Bell in 1975. The WFL ceased games on October 22, 1975, without finishing its second season. The Bell was coached by NFL hall of famer Willie Wood, the first black coach in modern professional football, and had former Philadelphia Eagles player Ben Hawkins, who once led the NFL in receiving, and also included such colorful personalities as King Corcorran (who led the WFL in touchdowns in 1974) and Tim Rossovich.

== Personal life ==
Kwalick earned a Bachelor of Science degree in Physical Education from Penn State University in 1969, and was married to Carolyn Kwalick and the father of a baby girl by 1968.

After retiring, Kwalick started ProTech Voltage Systems, Inc., in Santa Clara, California. He was both owner and president, retiring from the company in 2016. He formed Tight End Sportswear, located in Santa Clara, marketing sports apparel and featuring shirts showing city skylines and great football players.

He was inducted into the National Polish-American Sports Hall of Fame in 2005.
