= List of awards and nominations received by Tommy Lee Jones =

Tommy Lee Jones awards and nominations
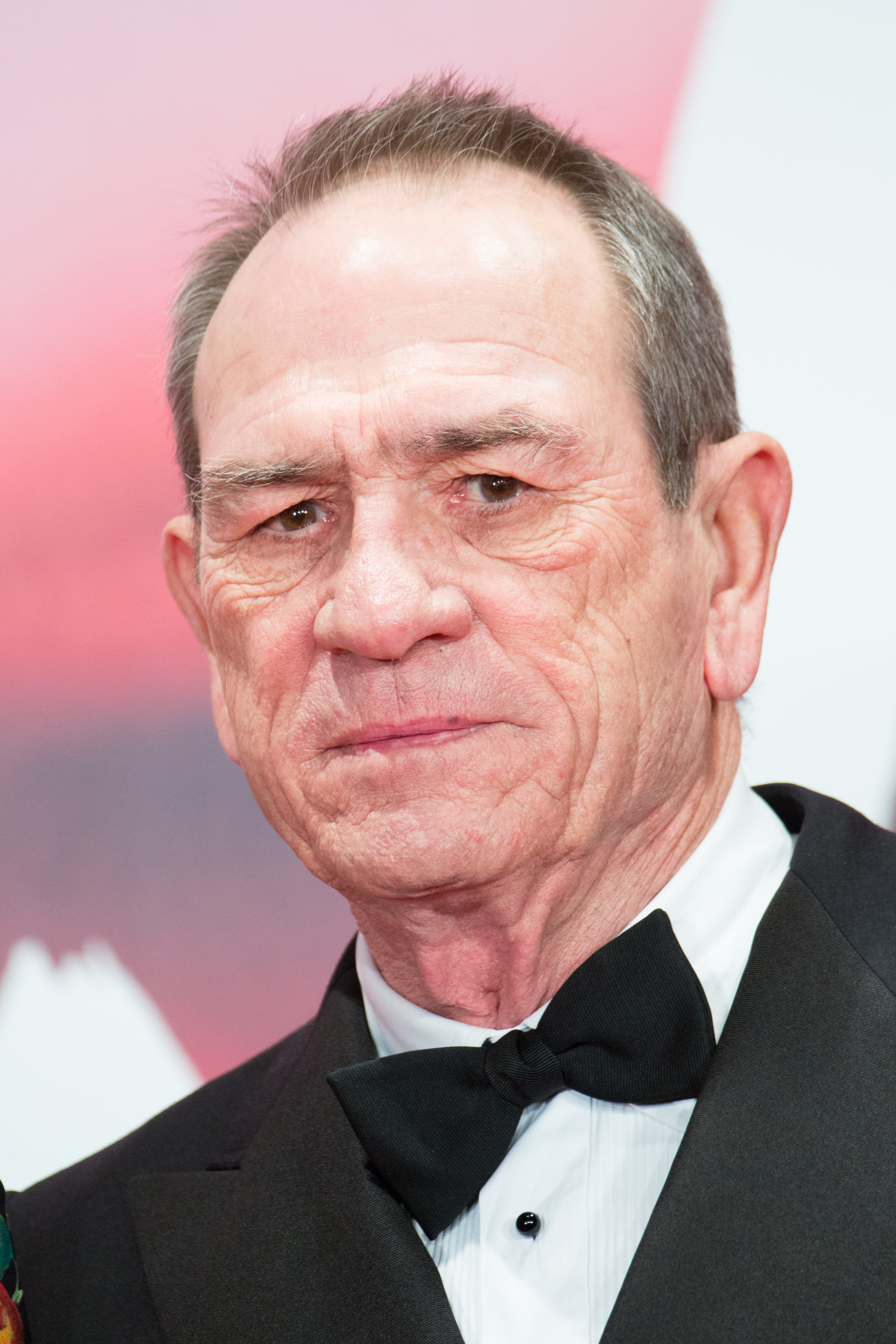
- Jones at the Tokyo International Film Festival in 2017
Awards and nominations
Award	Wins	Nominations
Golden Globe	1	4
Academy Awards	1	4
BAFTA Awards	0	4
Emmy Awards	1	2
Screen Actors Guild Awards	2	5

Tommy Lee Jones is an American Actor known for his performances on stage and screen.

Jones received various accolades including an Academy Award, a Golden Globe Award, a Primetime Emmy Award and two Screen Actors Guild Awards. He won the Academy Award for Best Supporting Actor for his role in the thriller The Fugitive (1993). His other Oscar-nominated roles were in JFK (1991), In the Valley of Elah (2007), and Lincoln (2012). He also received two Primetime Emmy Award nominations winning the Primetime Emmy Award for Outstanding Lead Actor in a Limited or Anthology Series or Movie for his performance as Gary Gilmore in The Executioner's Song (1992).

He received honorary awards including a star on the Hollywood Walk of Fame in 1994. He also received the Santa Barbara International Film Festival Award, American Riviera Award in 2007 and the San Sebastian International Film Festival Lifetime Achievement Award in 2012.

== Major associations ==
=== Academy Awards ===
Year	Category	Nominated work	Result	Ref.
1992	Best Supporting Actor	JFK	Nominated	
1994	Best Supporting Actor	The Fugitive	Won	
2008	Best Actor	In the Valley of Elah	Nominated	
2013	Best Supporting Actor	Lincoln	Nominated	

=== BAFTA Awards ===
Year	Category	Nominated work	Result	Ref.
1993	Best Supporting Actor	JFK	Nominated	
1994	Best Supporting Actor	The Fugitive	Nominated	
2008	Best Supporting Actor	No Country for Old Men	Nominated	
2013	Best Supporting Actor	Lincoln	Nominated	

=== Golden Globe Awards ===
Year	Category	Nominated work	Result	Ref.
1981	Best Actor in a Motion Picture - Comedy or Musical	Coal Miner's Daughter	Nominated	
1990	Best Supporting Actor in a Series, Miniseries or TV Movie	Lonesome Dove	Nominated	
1994	Best Supporting Actor in a Motion Picture	The Fugitive	Won	
2013	Best Supporting Actor in a Motion Picture	Lincoln	Nominated	

=== Emmy Awards ===
Year	Category	Nominated work	Result	Ref.
Primetime Emmy Awards
1983	Outstanding Lead Actor in a Limited Series or a Special	The Executioner's Song	Won	
1989	Outstanding Lead Actor in a Limited Series or a Special	Lonesome Dove	Nominated	

=== Screen Actors Guild Awards ===
Year	Category	Nominated work	Result	Ref.
1996	Outstanding Actor in a Television Movie or Miniseries	The Good Old Boys	Nominated	
2008	Outstanding Actor in a Supporting Role	No Country for Old Men	Nominated	
2008	Outstanding Ensemble in a Motion Picture	No Country for Old Men	Won	
2013	Outstanding Actor in a Supporting Role	Lincoln	Won	
2013	Outstanding Ensemble in a Motion Picture	Lincoln	Nominated	

== Miscellaneous awards ==
Year	Title	Accolade	Results
1992	Dallas-Fort Worth Film Critics Association Award, Best Supporting Actor	JFK	Won
1993	Boston Film Festival Award, Film Excellence Award	The Fugitive	Won
1993	Kansas City Film Critics Circle Award, Best Supporting Actor	The Fugitive	Won
1993	Los Angeles Film Critics Association Award, Best Supporting Actor	The Fugitive	Won
1993	New York Film Critics Circle Award, Best Supporting Actor	The Fugitive	Nominated
1993	Chicago Film Critics Association Award, Best Supporting Actor	The Fugitive	Nominated
1993	MTV Movie + TV Award, Best On-Screen Duo (shared with Harrison Ford)	The Fugitive	Won
1993	National Society of Film Critics Award, Best Supporting Actor	The Fugitive	Nominated
1993	Southeastern Film Critics Association Award, Best Supporting Actor	The Fugitive	Won
1995	Chicago Film Critics Association Award, Best Lead Actor	Cobb	Nominated
1995	MTV Movie + TV Award, Best Villain	Blown Away	Nominated
1995	MTV Movie + TV Award, Best Villain	Batman Forever	Nominated
1998	Blockbuster Entertainment Award, Favorite Lead Actor - Sci-Fi	Men in Black	Nominated
1998	MTV Movie + TV Award, Best On-Screen Duo (shared with Will Smith)	Men in Black	Nominated
1998	Satellite Award, Best Lead Actor in a Motion Picture - Comedy or Musical	Men in Black	Nominated
2000	Palm Beach International Film Festival Award, Lifetime Achievement Award - Acting		Won
2005	Cannes Film Festival Award, Best Actor	The Three Burials of Melquiades Estrada	Won
2005	Cannes Film Festival Award, Palme d'Or	The Three Burials of Melquiades Estrada	Nominated
2005	Satellite Award, Best Lead Actor in a Motion Picture - Drama	The Three Burials of Melquiades Estrada	Nominated
2006	Gotham Award, Best Ensemble Performance	A Prairie Home Companion	Nominated
2006	Independent Spirit Award, Best Feature	The Three Burials of Melquiades Estrada	Nominated
2007	Critics Choice Award, Best Acting Ensemble	A Prairie Home Companion	Nominated
2007	Dallas-Fort Worth Film Critics Association Award, Best Lead Actor	In the Valley of Elah	Nominated
2007	Detroit Film Critics Society Award, Best Lead Actor	No Country for Old Men	Nominated
2007	Indiewire Critics Poll Award, Best Supporting Performance	No Country for Old Men	Nominated
2007	National Board of Review Award, Best Acting by an Ensemble	No Country for Old Men	Won
2007	San Diego Film Critics Society Award, Best Supporting Actor	No Country for Old Men	Won
2007	Satellite Award, Best Lead Actor in a Motion Picture - Drama	In the Valley of Elah	Nominated
2007	St. Louis Film Critics Association Award, Best Lead Actor	In the Valley of Elah	Nominated
2007	St. Louis Film Critics Association Award, Best Supporting Actor	No Country for Old Men	Nominated
2007	Village Voice Film Poll Award, Best Lead Actor	In the Valley of Elah	Nominated
2007	Critics Choice Award, Best Acting Ensemble	No Country for Old Men	Nominated
2007	London Film Critics' Circle Award for Actor of the Year	In the Valley of Elah	Nominated
2007	Santa Barbara International Film Festival Award, American Riviera Award		Won
2010	Satellite Award, Best Supporting Actor in a Motion Picture	The Company Men	Nominated
2012	San Sebastian International Film Festival Lifetime Achievement Award		Won
2012	Boston Online Film Critics Association Award, Best Supporting Actor	Lincoln	Won
2012	Chicago Film Critics Association Award, Best Supporting Actor	Lincoln	Nominated
2012	Dallas-Fort Worth Film Critics Association Award, Best Supporting Actor	Lincoln	Won
2012	Detroit Film Critics Society Award, Best Supporting Actor	Lincoln	Nominated
2012	Houston Film Critics Society Award, Best Supporting Actor	Lincoln	Won
2012	Indiana Film Journalists Association Award, Best Supporting Actor	Lincoln	Won
2012	Indiewire Film Critics Poll Award, Best Supporting Performance	Lincoln	Nominated
2012	Las Vegas Film Critics Society Award, Best Supporting Actor	Lincoln	Won
2012	Nevada Film Critics Society Award, Best Supporting Actor	Lincoln	Won
2012	Nevada Film Critics Society Award, Best Ensemble Cast	Lincoln	Won
2012	New York Film Critics Circle Award, Best Supporting Actor	Lincoln	Nominated
2012	New York Film Critics Online Award, Best Supporting Actor	Lincoln	Won
2012	Phoenix Film Critics Society award, Best Supporting Actor	Lincoln	Nominated
2012	San Francisco Film Critics Circle Award, Best Supporting Actor	Lincoln	Won
2012	Satellite Award, Best Supporting Actor in a Motion Picture	Lincoln	Nominated
2012	Southeastern Film Critics Association Award, Best Supporting Actor	Lincoln	Nominated
2012	Southeastern Film Critics Association Award, Best Ensemble	Lincoln	Won
2012	St. Louis Film Critics Association Award, Best Supporting Actor	Lincoln	Nominated
2012	Toronto Film Critics Association Award, Best Supporting Actor	Lincoln	Nominated
2012	Village Voice Film Poll Award, Best Supporting Actor	Lincoln	Nominated
2012	Washington DC Area Film Critics Association Award, Best Supporting Actor	Lincoln	Nominated
2012	Critics Choice Award, Best Supporting Actor	Lincoln	Nominated
2012	Denver Film Critics Society Award, Best Supporting Actor	Lincoln	Nominated
2012	Iowa Film Critics Award, Best Supporting Actor	Lincoln	Won
2012	Italian Online Movie Award, Best Supporting Actor	Lincoln	Nominated
2012	London Film Critics' Circle Award for Supporting Actor of the Year	Lincoln	Nominated
2012	National Society of Film Critics Award, Best Supporting Actor	Lincoln	Nominated
2012	North Texas Film Critics Association Award, Best Supporting Actor	Lincoln	Won
2012	Online Film & Television Association Award, Best Supporting Actor	Lincoln	Won
2012	Online Film Critics Society Award, Best Supporting Actor	Lincoln	Nominated
2012	Vancouver Film Critics Circle Award, Best Supporting Actor	Lincoln	Nominated
2012	Jupiter Award, Best International Actor	Hope Springs	Won
2012	AAPR Movies for Grownups Award, Best Love Story (shared with Meryl Streep)	Hope Springs	Nominated
2014	Cannes Film Festival Award, Palme d'Or	The Homesman	Nominated
2014	Phoenix Film Critics Society Award, Best Lead Actor	The Homesman	Nominated
2015	AARP Movies for Grownups Award, Best Lead Actor	The Homesman	Nominated
2015	Almeria Western Film Festival Award, Best Feature Film	The Homesman	Won
2015	Georgia Film Critics Association Award, Best Feature	The Homesman	Nominated

== Honors ==
2009	Texas Cowboy Hall of Fame
2015	Texas Film Hall of Fame
2016	Hall of Great Western Performers at the National Cowboy & Western Heritage Museum in Oklahoma City, Oklahoma
