= 1979 Tufts Jumbos football team =

American college football season

1979 Tufts Jumbos football
- Conference: New England Small College Athletic Conference
- Record: 8–0 (7–0 NESCAC)
- Head coach: Vic Gatto (2nd season)
- Home stadium: Ellis Oval

1979 New England Small College Athletic Conference football standings
	Conf.					Overall
Team	W		L		T	W		L		T
Tufts	8	–	0	–	0	8	–	0	–	0
Bowdoin	5	–	2	–	0	5	–	3	–	0
Middlebury	4	–	2	–	0	5	–	3	–	0
Colby	4	–	3	–	0	5	–	3	–	0
Bates	3	–	3	–	0	5	–	3	–	0
Wesleyan	3	–	3	–	0	5	–	3	–	0
Amherst	3	–	3	–	0	3	–	5	–	0
Williams	3	–	4	–	0	4	–	4	–	0
Trinity (CT)	1	–	6	–	0	2	–	6	–	0
Hamilton	0	–	5	–	0	0	–	8	–	0
The NESCAC did not recognize an official conference champion until 2000

The 1979 Tufts Jumbos football team was an American football team that represented Tufts University in the New England Small College Athletic Conference (NESCAC) during the 1979 NCAA Division III football season. In their second season under head coach Vic Gatto, the Jumbos compiled a perfect 8–0 record. It was the first Tufts team to record a perfect season since 1934. The team played its home games at Ellis Oval in Somerville, Massachusetts. Key players included quarterback Chris Connors.

== Schedule ==
Date	Opponent	Site	Result	Attendance	Source
September 22	at Wesleyan	Middletown, CT	W 20–12	1,000	
September 29	Hamilton	Ellis Oval; Medford, MA	W 53–21	1,300–3,000	
October 6	Middlebury	Ellis Oval; Medford, MA	W 35–13	5,500	
October 13	at Norwich*	Northfield, VT	W 22–19	4,500–5,000	
October 20	at Williams	Williamstown, MA	W 30–0	3,000	
October 27	Amherst^{†}	Ellis Oval; Medford, MA	W 35–21	8,500	
November 3	Colby	Ellis Oval; Medford, MA	W 20–0	479	
November 10	at Bates	Lewiston, ME	W 35–7	1,500	
*Non-conference game; ^{†}Homecoming
