= Holy Family High School (New Bedford, Massachusetts) =

Catholic high school

Location
- 91 Summer St. New Bedford, Bristol County, Massachusetts 02740; 41.6381°N 70.9326°W

Information
- School type: Parochial high school
- Motto: Omnia per Mariam (All through Mary)
- Religious affiliation: Roman Catholic
- Established: 1891
- Status: Defunct
- Closed: 1985
- School district: Diocese of Fall River
- Director: Fr. John P. Driscoll (1985)
- Principal: Kenneth L. Kramer (1985)
- Employees: 19
- Grades: 4
- Enrolment: 202
  - Grade 9: 49
  - Grade 10: 52
  - Grade 11: 38
  - Grade 12: 63
- Campus type: Urban
- Colours: Blue and White
- Athletics: Yes
- Sports: Boys' basketball, girls' basketball, boys' soccer, cheerleading, boys' baseball, girls' softball
- Nickname: Blue Waves
- Newspaper: Navigator
- Yearbook: The Maria
- Alumni: Bishop James Joseph Gerrard, Don Gillis, Bob Halloran
- Website: http://holyfamilyhighschoolalumni.org

Holy Family High School was a Roman Catholic parochial high school located in New Bedford, Massachusetts. It was founded in 1891 and was originally staffed by the Sisters of Mercy.

== History ==
Holy Family High School was founded in 1891 as a part of St. Lawrence, Martyr Parish in New Bedford. It was originally staffed by the Sisters of Mercy, but they left in the 1970s. The school closed in 1985 due to declining enrollment. It remained vacant and boarded up until its recent conversion into the "121 North" apartment community in 2024.

== Notable alumni ==
- James Joseph Gerrard, Catholic bishop
- Don Gillis, longtime Boston sportscaster
- Bob Halloran, sportscaster and sports executive

== Notable faculty ==
- Arnie Oliver, a soccer player who played for the United States at the first World Cup in 1930, later coached at Holy Family.

== List of administration ==
The following list was compiled from yearbook information.

Principal	Years	Assistant Principal	Years	Assistant Principal	Years	Athletic Director	Years
Sr. Mary Louise, R.S.M.	1940-49	none	1941-75	none	1941-78	unknown	1940-59
Sr. Mary Virginia, R.S.M.	1950-62	none	1941-75	none	1941-78	unknown	1940-59
Sr. Mary Virginia, R.S.M.	1950-62	none	1941-75	none	1941-78	Fr. Justin J. Quinn	1958-62
unknown	1962-68	none	1941-75	none	1941-78	unknown	1962-75
Sr. Mary Charles Francis, R.S.M.	1968-75	none	1941-75	none	1941-78	unknown	1962-75
Sr. Mary Charles Francis, R.S.M.	1968-75	unknown	1969-77	none	1941-78	Stephen Anderson	1974-75
unknown	1975-77	unknown	1969-77	none	1941-78	unknown	1975-77
John J. Finni	1978	William P. Gushue	1978	none	1941-78	Thomas Kruger	1977-78
unknown	1978-82	unknown	1979-82	unknown	1978-82	unknown	1978-82
Kenneth L. Kramer	1983-85	Daniel P. Larkin	1983-85	Thomas Kruger	1983	Mark Cathcart	1982-83
Kenneth L. Kramer	1983-85	Daniel P. Larkin	1983-85	Gary Brown	1984	unknown	1983-84
Kenneth L. Kramer	1983-85	Daniel P. Larkin	1983-85	none	1985	Frances A. Brezinski	1984-85

== Faculty and staff ==
Year	Religious	Lay	Total
1941	11	1	12
1944	13	0	13
1946	12	0	12
1949	12	0	12
1950	12	0	12
1951	12	1	13
1952	12	0	12
1953	12	0	12
1954	12	0	12
1959	12	0	12
1962	12	0	12
1973	5	8	13
1975	3	13	16
1978	6	12	18
1983	4	16	20
1984	4	16	20
1985	2	17	19
Source: www.classmates.com
