= Life Study (film) =

- Directed by: Michael Nebbia
- Written by: Arthur Birkrant
- Story by: Michael Nebbia
- Produced by: Michael Nebbia
- Starring: Tommy Lee Jones
- Cinematography: Michael Nebbia
- Edited by: Sidney Katz; Ray Sandiford
- Music by: Emmanuel Vardi
- Release date: January 25, 1973 (New York City)
- Running time: 99 minutes
- Country: United States
- Language: English

Life Study is a 1973 romance film of young Italian-American boy Angelo and a rich, eccentric, lonely girl Myrna. The film stars are Bartholomew Miro Jr. as Angelo, Erika Peterson as Myrna and Tommy Lee Jones as Gus, directed by Michael Nebbia (Alice's Restaurant). It is Nebbia's directorial debut.

== Cast ==
- Bartholomew Miro Jr. as Angelo Corelli
- Erika Peterson as Myrna Clement
- Gregory D'Alessio as Adrian Clement
- Tommy Lee Jones as Gus
- Rosetta Garuffi as Grandma
- Anthony Forest as John Clement
- Yvonne Sherwell as Peggy Clement
- Ed Mona as Vinnie

== Production ==
Principal photography took place during June 1970 in Middletown, New York, Denbo, Pennsylvania and Pittsburgh.

== Home media ==
The film has never been released on video.

== See also ==
- List of American films of 1973
