= Vic Gatto =

American football player and coach (born 1947)

Biographical details
- Born: April 24, 1947 (age 79)

Playing career

Football
- 1966–1968: Harvard
- Position: Halfback

Coaching career (HC unless noted)

Football
- 1969–1972: Middlesex School (MA)
- 1973–1977: Bates
- 1978–1984: Tufts
- 1985–1989: Davidson

Head coaching record
- Overall: 55–89–4 (college football)

Accomplishments and honors

Awards
- Third-team All-American (1967); Nils V. "Swede" Nelson Award (1968); First-team All-East (1967); Second-team All-East (1968); All-Ivy League 1st team (1968)

Victor Emmanuel Gatto (born April 24, 1947) is an American former football player and coach. He served as the head football coach at Bates College (1973–1977), Tufts University (1978–1984), and Davidson College (1985–1989), compiling a career college football head coaching record of 52–92–4. Gatto played college football as a halfback at Harvard University from 1966 to 1968. He won the Nils V. "Swede" Nelson Award in 1968 and was the team captain in the legendary 1968 Yale vs. Harvard football game. He appeared in Harvard Beats Yale 29–29, a 2008 documentary film about this game. Prior to being hired at Bates, Gatto coached football, baseball, and lacrosse at the Middlesex School in Concord, Massachusetts.

== Head coaching record ==
=== College football ===
Year	Team	Overall	Conference	Standing	Bowl/playoffs
Bates Bobcats (Maine Intercollegiate Athletic Association) (1973)
1973	Bates	1–7	0–2	3rd	
Bates Bobcats (New England Small College Athletic Conference) (1974–1977)
1974	Bates	4–4			
1975	Bates	2–6			
1976	Bates	3–6			
1977	Bates	4–3–1			
Bates:		14–26–1			
Tufts Jumbos (New England Small College Athletic Conference) (1978–1984)
1978	Tufts	5–3	4–3		
1979	Tufts	8–0	7–0		
1980	Tufts	6–2	6–2		
1981	Tufts	5–2–1	5–2–1		
1982	Tufts	6–2	6–2		
1983	Tufts	4–3–1	4–3–1		
1984	Tufts	0–7–1	0–6–1		
Tufts:		34–19–3	32–18–3		
Davidson Wildcats (Southern Conference) (1985–1986)
1985	Davidson	1–10	0–6	8th	
1986	Davidson	0–9	0–6	T–8th	
Davidson Wildcats (Patriot League) (1987–1988)
1987	Davidson	1–10	0–3	6th	
1988	Davidson	0–10	0–4	6th	
Davidson Wildcats (NCAA Division III Independent) (1989)
1989	Davidson	2–8			
Davidson:		4–47	0–17		
Total:		52–93–4			
