= Four on a Garden =

Four on a Garden is a set of four One-act plays that were presented on Broadway at the Broadhurst Theatre from January 30, 1971, until March 20, 1971. The set included House of Dunkelmayer, Betty, Toreador, and The Swingers. The four plays were originally written by French playwrights Pierre Barillet and Jean-Pierre Gredy but were adapted into English by Abe Burrows. Burrows directed the show whose cast included Sid Caesar, Carol Channing, Tommy Lee Jones, and George S. Irving.

== Sources ==
- Four on a Garden at the Internet Broadway Database
