= Tommy Lee Jones =

American actor (born 1946)

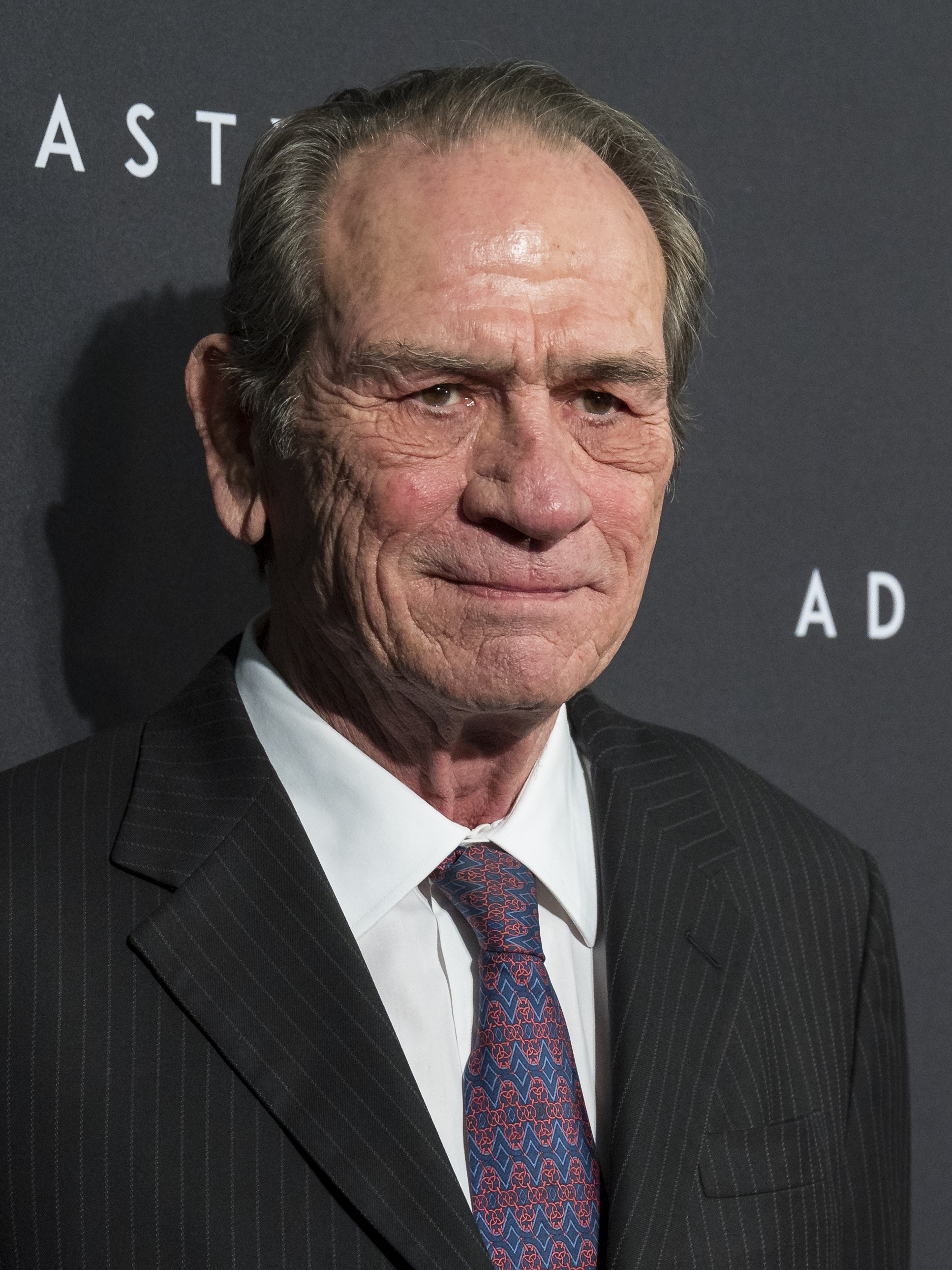
- Jones in 2019
- Born: Thomas Lee Jones; September 15, 1946 (age 80); San Saba, Texas, U.S.
- Education: Harvard University (BA)
- Occupations: Actor; film director
- Years active: 1969–present
- Works: Full list
- Spouses: Katherine Lardner (m. 1971; div. 1978); Kimberlea Cloughley (m. 1981; div. 1996); Dawn Laurel (m. 2001)
- Children: 2
- Awards: Full list
- Football career

No. 61
- Position: Guard

Personal information
- Listed height: 6 ft 1 in (1.85 m)
- Listed weight: 200 lb (91 kg)

Career information
- High school: St. Mark's (Dallas, Texas); Robert E. Lee (Midland, Texas)
- College: Harvard (1965–1968)

Awards and highlights
- 1st team All-Ivy League (1968)

Thomas Lee Jones (born September 15, 1946) is an American actor, film director, and former football player. He has received various accolades including an Academy Award, a Golden Globe Award, a Primetime Emmy Award, and two Screen Actors Guild Awards.

After appearing in several projects from the 1960s to 1980s, Jones established himself as a leading man in the 1990s, known for his gruff and authoritative film roles. He won the Academy Award for Best Supporting Actor for his performance as U.S. Marshal Samuel Gerard in the thriller film The Fugitive (1993). His other Oscar-nominated roles were as businessman Clay Shaw in JFK (1991), Hank Deerfield in In the Valley of Elah (2007), and Congressman Thaddeus Stevens in Lincoln (2012). He played Agent K in the Men in Black franchise. Other notable roles were in Coal Miner's Daughter (1980), Volcano (1997), Under Siege (1992), Natural Born Killers (1994), The Client (1994), Batman Forever (1995), Double Jeopardy (1999), No Country for Old Men (2007), The Company Men (2010), Captain America: The First Avenger (2011), Jason Bourne (2016) and Ad Astra (2019).

Jones won the Primetime Emmy Award for Outstanding Lead Actor in a Limited Series or Movie for his role as executed murderer Gary Gilmore in The Executioner's Song (1982). He was further nominated for playing Texas Ranger Woodrow F. Call in the television miniseries Lonesome Dove (1989). He portrayed Howard Hughes in the CBS film The Amazing Howard Hughes (1977). He directed and starred in the western TNT movie The Good Old Boys (1995). He directed, starred in, and executive produced the HBO film The Sunset Limited (2011).

== Early life and education ==
Tommy Lee Jones was born on September 15, 1946, in San Saba, Texas. His mother, Lucille Marie Jones (née Scott; 1928–2013), was a police officer, schoolteacher, and beauty shop owner. His father, Clyde C. Jones (1926–1986), was a cowboy and oil field worker. The two were married and divorced twice. Jones is of Cherokee descent. He was raised in Midland, Texas, and attended Midland Lee High School. Jones later moved to Dallas and graduated from the St. Mark's School of Texas in 1965, which he attended on scholarship.

=== College ===
Jones entered Harvard College in 1965 on need-based aid. As an upperclassman, he lived in Dunster House and was roommates with future U.S. vice president Al Gore and with Bob Somerby, who later became editor of the media criticism site The Daily Howler. Jones majored in English literature and was a pupil of dramatist Robert Chapman. He graduated in 1969 with a Bachelor of Arts degree, cum laude. His senior thesis was on "the mechanics of Catholicism" in the works of Flannery O'Connor.

==== College football ====
Jones played guard on the Harvard Crimson football team from 1965 to 1968. He was a member of Harvard's undefeated 1968 football team. He was named as a first-team All-Ivy League selection, and played in the 1968 Game. The game featured a memorable and last-minute Harvard 16-point comeback to tie Yale. He recounted his memory of "the most famous football game in Ivy League history" in the documentary Harvard Beats Yale 29–29.

== Career ==
=== Early acting and film (1969–1982) ===
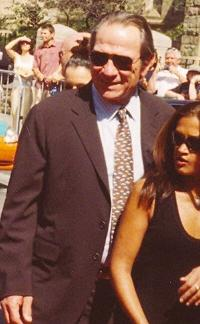
Jones in 2006

After graduating from Harvard in 1969, Jones moved to New York City to become an actor, making his Broadway debut in 1969's A Patriot for Me in a number of supporting roles. In 1970, he landed his first film role, coincidentally playing a Harvard student in Love Story (Erich Segal, the author of Love Story, said that he based the lead character of Oliver on aspects of two undergraduate roommates he knew while on a sabbatical at Harvard, Jones and Al Gore).

In early 1971, he returned to Broadway in Abe Burrows' Four on a Garden where he shared the stage with Carol Channing and Sid Caesar. Between 1971 and 1975 he portrayed Dr. Mark Toland on the ABC soap opera One Life to Live. He returned to the stage for a short-lived 1974 production of Ulysses in Nighttown, an adaptation of one episode from James Joyce's novel Ulysses, playing Stephen Dedalus opposite Zero Mostel's Leopold Bloom and directed by Burgess Meredith. It was followed by the acclaimed TV movie The Amazing Howard Hughes, where he played the lead role.

In films, he played a hunted escaped convict in Jackson County Jail (1976), a Vietnam veteran in Rolling Thunder (1977), an automobile mogul, co-starring with Laurence Olivier, in the Harold Robbins drama The Betsy (1978), and a police detective opposite Faye Dunaway in the 1978 thriller Eyes of Laura Mars.

In 1980, Jones earned his first Golden Globe nomination for his portrayal of country singer Loretta Lynn's husband, Doolittle "Mooney" Lynn, in Coal Miner's Daughter. In 1981, he played a drifter opposite Sally Field in Back Roads, a comedy that received middling reviews. In 1982, he co-starred with Tuesday Weld in the HBO adaptation of The Rainmaker, directed by John Frankenheimer.

=== Further exposure (1983–2004) ===
In 1983, he won a Primetime Emmy Award for his performance as murderer Gary Gilmore in The Executioner's Song, the television adaptation of Norman Mailer's novel. The same year, he starred in a pirate adventure, Nate and Hayes, playing pirate captain Bully Hayes. In 1986, Jones played a former thief working for the FBI in the action thriller Black Moon Rising.

In 1988, Jones co-starred with Chad Lowe and Robert Urich in the made-for-TV film April Morning, which depicted the Battle of Lexington in the American Revolutionary War. In 1989, he earned a second Emmy nomination for his portrayal of Texas Ranger Woodrow F. Call in the acclaimed television miniseries Lonesome Dove, based on the best-seller by Larry McMurtry.

In the 1990s, Jones was featured in numerous blockbuster films. He starred as Clay Shaw in JFK (1991), receiving BAFTA and Academy Award nominations. In The Fugitive (1993), co-starring Harrison Ford, his performance as relentless and sharp-witted Deputy U.S. Marshal Samuel Gerard in The Fugitive received broad acclaim. He received Golden Globe and BAFTA nominations and won the Academy Award for Best Supporting Actor. When he accepted his Oscar, his head was shaved for his role in the film Cobb (1994), which he made light of in his speech: "The only thing a man can say at a time like this is 'I am not really bald'. Actually I'm lucky to be working". He reprised the role of Gerard in the sequel, U.S. Marshals (1998). He played Harvey Dent / Two-Face in Batman Forever (1995) and starred as Michael "Mike" Roark in Volcano (1997) co-starring Anne Heche and Don Cheadle. His role as grizzled alien investigator Kevin Brown / Agent K in Men in Black (1997), with Will Smith, brought him critical acclaim with critics and audiences. Among his other well-known performances during the 1990s were those of a terrorist who hijacks a U.S. Navy battleship in Under Siege (1992), an ambitious U.S. Attorney "Reverend" Roy Foltrigg in The Client (1994), an overwhelmed maximum-security prison warden in Natural Born Killers (1994), and a parole officer in Double Jeopardy (1999).

In 2000, Jones co-starred with Samuel L. Jackson as a Vietnam War veteran and Marine colonel serving as Jackson's defense attorney in the film Rules of Engagement, and co-starred with director Clint Eastwood as astronauts in the film Space Cowboys, in which both played retired pilots and friends/rivals leading a space rescue mission together. In 2002, he and Will Smith co-starred in the Men in Black sequel, Men in Black II.

=== Later years (2005–present) ===
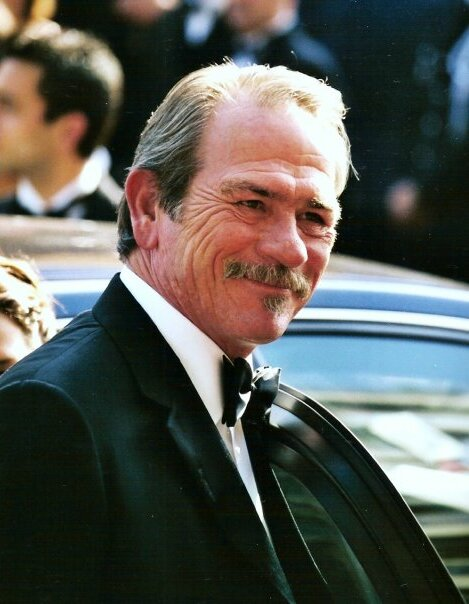
Jones at the 2005 Cannes Film Festival

In 2005, the first theatrical feature film Jones directed, The Three Burials of Melquiades Estrada, was presented at the 2005 Cannes Film Festival. Jones's character speaks both English and Spanish in the film. His performance won him the Best Actor Award at Cannes. His first film as a director had been The Good Old Boys in 1995, a made-for-television movie.

Two strong performances in 2007 marked a resurgence in Jones's career. For his role as a beleaguered father investigating the disappearance of his soldier son in In the Valley of Elah, he received an Academy Award nomination. His next role as a Texas sheriff hunting an assassin in the Best Picture-winning No Country for Old Men brought him critical acclaim, a BAFTA nomination, and two Screen Actors Guild Awards nominations (Supporting Actor and Outstanding Ensemble).

Jones has been a spokesman for Japanese brewing company Suntory since 2006. He can be seen in various Japanese television commercials of Suntory's Coffee brand Boss as a character called "Alien Jones", an extraterrestrial who takes the form of a human to check on the world of humans. Many of these commercials can be seen on YouTube. In 2011, Jones appeared in public service announcements on Japanese television, joining a number of other popular figures who sang two sentimental songs in remembrance of those lost in the 2011 Tōhoku earthquake and tsunami.

In 2010, Jones appeared alongside Ben Affleck in the recession drama The Company Men. The film premiered at the Sundance Film Festival, where early reviews praised Jones's performance as "pitch-perfect". Jones played Colonel Chester Phillips in the Marvel Studios film, Captain America: The First Avenger (2011). He also directed, produced and co-starred with Samuel L. Jackson in an adaptation of The Sunset Limited (2011).

In 2012, there was another turning point in Jones's career, starting with playing Agent K again in Men in Black 3, portraying Arnold Soames in the romantic dramedy Hope Springs, and co-starring as Thaddeus Stevens in Steven Spielberg's Lincoln. Jones's performance in Lincoln received wide critical acclaim, and he was nominated for the Golden Globe, BAFTA, two Screen Actors Guild Awards (Supporting Actor and Outstanding Ensemble), and Academy Award. Since Lincoln, Jones has continued appearing in popular films, including portraying CIA Director Robert Dewey in the action thriller film Jason Bourne (2016) and missing astronaut H. Clifford McBride in the sci-fi Ad Astra (2019), co-starring Brad Pitt, Ruth Negga, Liv Tyler, and Donald Sutherland.

== Personal life ==
Jones was married to actress Kate Lardner, the niece of screenwriter and journalist Ring Lardner Jr., from 1971 to 1978. He had two children, Austin and Victoria, from his second marriage to Kimberlea Cloughley, who is the daughter of Phil Hardberger, a former mayor of San Antonio. On March 19, 2001, he married his third wife, photographer Dawn Laurel.

Jones resides in Terrell Hills, Texas, a city near San Antonio. He owns a 3,000-acre (1,200 ha) cattle ranch in San Saba County, Texas, and a ranch near Van Horn, Texas, which served as the set for his film The Three Burials of Melquiades Estrada (2005). Until 2019, he owned an equestrian estate in Wellington, Florida.

Jones is a polo player. He has a house at the Santa Maria Polo Club in Buenos Aires, Argentina. He is a supporter of the Harvard Polo Club and a member of the Polo Training Foundation.

He is an avid San Antonio Spurs fan; he is often seen courtside at Spurs games. At the 2000 Democratic National Convention, he gave the nominating speech for his former college roommate, Al Gore, as the Democratic Party's nominee for President of the United States.

On January 1, 2026, Jones' daughter, Victoria, was found dead in a San Francisco hotel from an apparent drug overdose. She was 34 years old. Court documents indicate that she had struggled with drug and alcohol use in the months leading up to her death. In August 2023, records show that Victoria had been held involuntarily at a hospital in Greenbrae, California, after being deemed a danger to herself or others; she requested that a conservator transfer her to a rehabilitation facility upon release. Jones successfully petitioned the court to place her under conservatorship, citing her risk of "life-threatening conduct" and need for drug rehabilitation, but later asked the court to dismiss the matter in the following months.

== See also ==
- Notable alumni of St. Mark's School of Texas
- List of actors with Academy Award nominations
- List of actors with more than one Academy Award nomination in the acting categories
