= John Yovicsin =

American football player and coach (1918–1989)

Biographical details
- Born: October 17, 1918; Steelton, Pennsylvania, U.S.
- Died: September 13, 1989 (aged 70); Barnstable, Massachusetts, U.S.

Playing career
- 1937–1939: Gettysburg
- 1944: Philadelphia Eagles
- Position: Defensive end

Coaching career (HC unless noted)
- 1948–1951: Gettysburg (assistant)
- 1952–1956: Gettysburg
- 1957–1970: Harvard

Head coaching record
- Overall: 110–53–5

Accomplishments and honors

Championships
- 3 Ivy (1961, 1966, 1968)

John Michael Yovicsin (October 17, 1918 – September 13, 1989) was an American college football coach and player. He played college football at Gettysburg College from 1937 to 1939 and then professionally with Philadelphia Eagles of the National Football League (NFL) in 1944. Yovicsin served as the head football coach at Gettysburg College from 1952 to 1956 and at Harvard University from 1957 to 1970, compiling a career record of 110–53–5.

Yovicsin was born in Steelton, Pennsylvania and graduated from Gettysburg College in 1940. He returned to Gettysburg as assistant football coach in 1948 and was the head coach there from 1952 to 1956, tallying a mark of 32–11. During his 14 years at Harvard, Yovicsin amassed a record of 78–42–5. He helmed the Crimson during the famous 1968 Harvard–Yale Game, in which Harvard mounted a late comeback to tie Yale, 29–29. Yovicsin's role as coach is mentioned many times in the documentary Harvard Beats Yale 29-29, where players on both the Harvard and Yale squads talk about his professorial bearing.

Yovicsin died on September 13, 1989, of heart disease in Barnstable, Massachusetts at the age of 70.

== Head coaching record ==
Year	Team	Overall	Conference	Standing	Bowl/playoffs
Gettysburg Bullets () (1952–1956)
1952	Gettysburg	6–3			
1953	Gettysburg	8–1			
1954	Gettysburg	5–3			
1955	Gettysburg	6–2			
1956	Gettysburg	7–2			
Gettysburg:		32–11			
Harvard Crimson (Ivy League) (1957–1970)
1957	Harvard	3–5	2–5	7th	
1958	Harvard	4–5	3–4	6th	
1959	Harvard	6–3	4–3	3rd	
1960	Harvard	5–4	4–3	3rd	
1961	Harvard	6–3	6–1	T–1st	
1962	Harvard	6–3	5–2	2nd	
1963	Harvard	5–2–2	4–2–1	3rd	
1964	Harvard	6–3	5–2	2nd	
1965	Harvard	5–2–2	3–2–2	3rd	
1966	Harvard	8–1	6–1	T–1st	
1967	Harvard	6–3	4–3	T–4th	
1968	Harvard	8–0–1	6–0–1	T–1st	
1969	Harvard	3–6	2–5	T–5th	
1970	Harvard	7–2	5–2	T–2nd	
Harvard:		78–42–5			
Total:		110–53–5			
National championship Conference title Conference division title or championship game berth

== See also ==
- 1968 Yale vs. Harvard football game
