= 1968 Yale vs. Harvard football game =

Harvard Beats Yale, 29–29 The Tie The Miracle
Yale Bulldogs	Harvard Crimson
(8–0)	(8–0)
29	29
Head coach: Carmen Cozza	Head coach: John Yovicsin
	1	2	3	4	Total
Yale	7	15	0	7	29
Harvard	0	6	7	16	29
- Date: November 23, 1968
- Season: 1968
- Stadium: Harvard Stadium
- Location: Boston, Massachusetts
- Attendance: 40,280

United States TV coverage
- Network: WHDH (radio and TV)
- Announcers: Don Gillis; Ken Coleman

The 1968 Yale vs. Harvard football game was a college football game between the Yale Bulldogs and the Harvard Crimson played on November 23, 1968. The game ended in a 29–29 tie, and as a result, the two teams shared the 1968 Ivy League title. Because Yale were considered heavy favorites and Harvard scored 16 points in the final 42 seconds to tie the game, the result inspired a famous headline in The Harvard Crimson, "Harvard Beats Yale, 29–29". The game, which was the 85th edition of a long rivalry between the two football programs, has also been referred to simply as "The Tie" or "The Miracle".

In 2010, ESPN ranked it No. 9 in its list of the top ten college football ties of all time. Subsequent rule changes have eliminated ties from college football, and this was the final tie game in the Harvard–Yale series.

== Background ==
=== Harvard–Yale rivalry ===
Harvard and Yale began playing an annual American football game in 1875. As a result of their long history, including Yale's founding, their geographic proximity, and social competition between the alumni of both prestigious universities, the rivalry between the two teams is considered one of the most historic and admired in American athletics and college football. As two of the oldest universities and athletics programs in the country, Harvard and Yale pioneered many of the iconic features of American football and collegiate athletics, including cheerleading, spring practice, and fight songs, as well as most of the rules of the sport.

Until the Ivy League began participation in postseason play in 2025, it was also the final game of the season for both teams and has often determined the winner of the Ivy League, which was the highest possible honor for either program. Over the years, it has accounted for many of the schools' best-known athletic feats.

=== 1968 season ===
Both schools entered the game with perfect 8–0 records, meaning that the winner of the game would be the Ivy League champion. It was the first time both schools met when undefeated and untied since the 1909 season. However, they took very different paths to get there.

==== Yale ====
Yale entered the 1968 game with a 16-game winning streak under Hall of Fame coach Carmen Cozza, having won the Ivy League in 1967 with an 8–1 record and never trailing in a single game during the 1968 season. Although Ivy League teams rarely produced professional talent or competed for national recognition in the bowl game era, Yale received votes for the Associated Press rankings and ultimately saw three players (Dowling, Hill, and Bruce Weinstein) drafted into the National Football League.

The Yale quarterback, Brian Dowling, had not lost a game as a starter since the seventh grade. Dowling finished ninth in the 1968 Heisman Trophy voting, with the fourth-most first-place votes, and his nickname on the Yale campus was "God". During the season, Dowling served as the basis for the long-running Doonesbury character B. D.

Running back Calvin Hill, who would win the NFL Offensive Rookie of the Year for the Dallas Cowboys the following season, had over 1,200 yards from scrimmage and fourteen touchdowns, earning his second consecutive all-Ivy League honors. The Yale roster also included two Rhodes Scholars, future Baltimore mayor Kurt Schmoke and Tom Neville. The Bulldogs outscored their opponents on the season by 288–118.

==== Harvard ====
Harvard, which had finished fourth in the Ivy League in 1967, was led by head coach John Yovicsin and had no players who were considered superstars on the level of Dowling and Hill. They were led on offense by all-Ivy guard Tommy Lee Jones and running backs Vic Gatto (who was also team captain) and Ray Hornblower. However, their strength was on defense, where they had only allowed multiple scores twice entering the Yale game and were considered the stingiest defense in major college football. They had three all-Ivy defensive starters: defensive end Pete Hall, linebacker John Emery, and defensive back Pat Conway. The roster included Paul Saba, a future Rhodes Scholar. They outscored their opponents by 236–90.

The 1968 Harvard team was dogged by questions at the quarterback position. After the season, starting quarterback George Lalich joked, "When we came to early practice the Boston area papers didn't even mention me as a prospect. The only guy they seemed to think had a chance was someone named Big Hole. The columns read, 'and at quarterback the Crimson will have a Big Hole.' Well, I didn't know this guy Big Hole, so I decided to show up for practice and try my luck." In a preseason game against New Hampshire, Harvard relied heavily on rookies and lost, 16–7.

In their first game, Harvard went down 20–12 against Holy Cross in the third quarter, but late touchdown passes to Pete Varney and Bruce Freeman salvaged the victory. For the rest of the season, the team didn't look back, defeating Bucknell 59–0 and allowing only six touchdowns in their six Ivy League games to finish the year 8–0. Questions at quarterback persisted, however, with Lalich throwing for only one more touchdown after the Holy Cross game and running for only 30 yards on the season.

=== Social context ===
The 1968 season was played against a background of social unrest and change across the United States, particularly on college campuses. "It was an unbelievable game in a very different society," Dowling later said. The teams themselves, particularly Harvard, were also socially engaged. Some players had protested American involvement in the Vietnam War and the teams included at least one veteran of the war, Pat Conway. At least two Harvard players were members of the ROTC, while two others regularly attended meetings of the Students for a Democratic Society.

At the time, college football was much more popular relative to the professional game. Harvard halfback Vic Gatto later said that both students and local residents would ring the field to watch the Crimson practice. "The Patriots were around, but they weren't big. So we were the game. If you lived in Cambridge or the environs, that's what you'd want to see." In the week leading up to the game, tickets were selling for $200 each (approximately $1,852 in 2025 dollars).

== Game ==
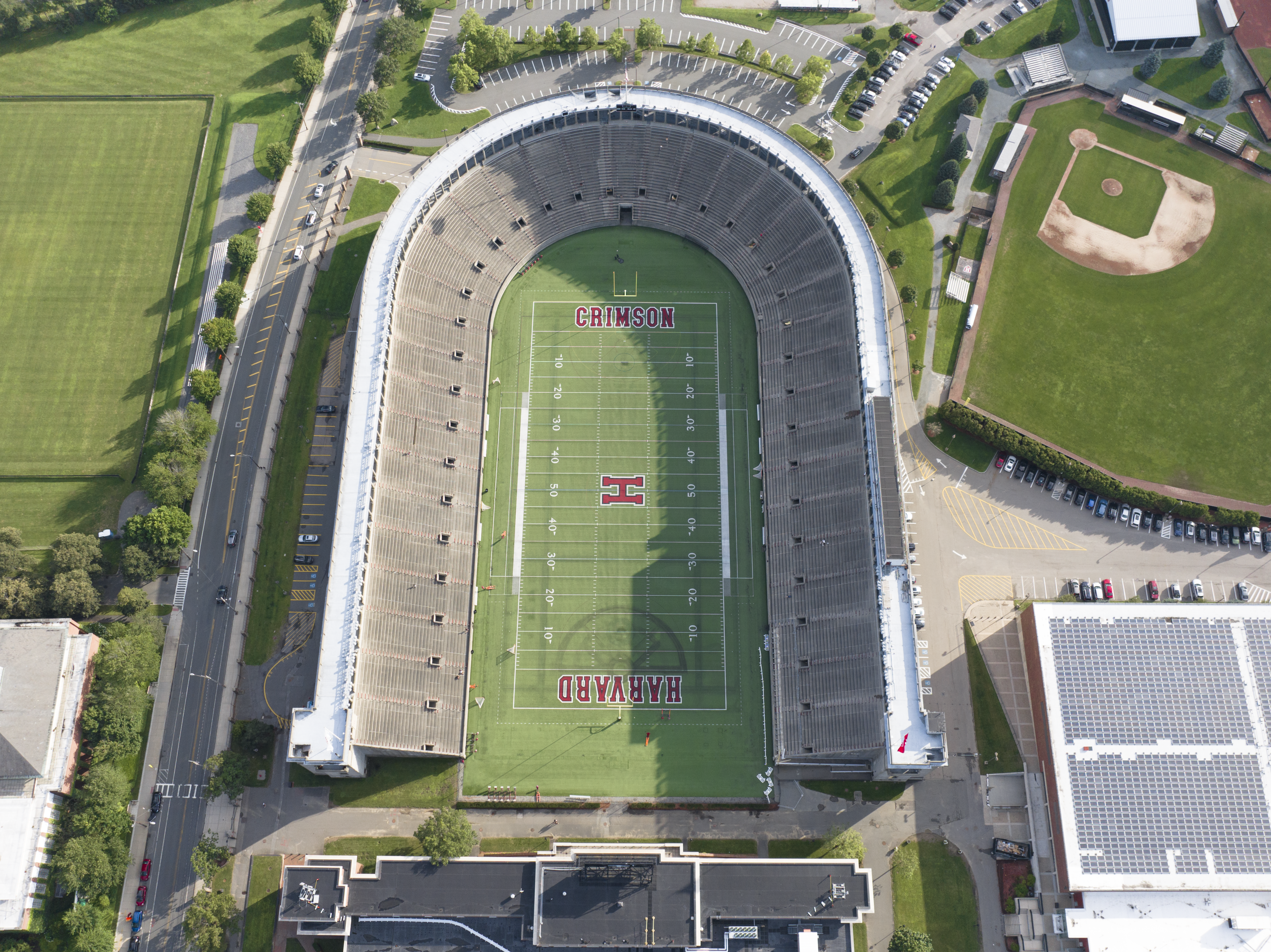
Harvard Stadium (pictured in 2023) attracted a capacity crowd for the 1968 game.

The game attracted a capacity crowd of 40,280 spectators, as well as a record 400 reporters in the Harvard Stadium press box.

Despite Harvard's vaunted defense, Yale quickly gained a 22–0 lead in the second quarter, converting a two-point conversion after their third touchdown. According to John F. Cramer III, who played tight end in the game for Harvard, "The first 59 minutes were actually kind of a boring game. Yale ground down ahead and had this apparently insurmountable lead." For the final drive of the first half, Yovicsin benched Lalich for backup quarterback Frank Champi. Champi led the team downfield, culminating in a 15-yard pass to right-end Bruce Freeman to narrow the score to 22–6 with 44 seconds in the first half; however, they muffed the extra point.

Despite Champi's successful drive, Yovicsin put Lalich back in at quarterback to start the second half, before later returning Champi to the lineup.

=== Harvard comeback ===
Leading late in the fourth quarter, Yale was driving deep into Harvard territory when a fumble by fullback Bob Levin was recovered by Steve Ranere, giving Harvard the ball at its own 14 yard-line, trailing 29–13 with 3 minutes and 34 seconds remaining. With Champi at quarterback, the Crimson completed a nine-play, 86-yard drive ending in a touchdown. The longest play of the drive was actually the result of a fumble by Champi, which was recovered by junior offensive tackle Fritz Reed for a seventeen-yard gain. On the following play, Champi scrambled under pressure from the Yale defense and found Freeman open for a Crimson touchdown with 42 seconds of play remaining. Freeman later recalled, "[Champi] threw a perfect pass. I didn't even run into the end zone. I sort of jogged and thought, 'That was easy.'" After the score, the Crimson lined up for a two-point conversion attempt to cut the Yale lead to 29–21. Although the initial attempt was unsuccessful, a pass interference call gave them a second attempt, which they converted on a run from Gus Crim.

After Freeman's touchdown, the mood in Harvard Stadium changed dramatically. "The atmosphere became very charged at that point. Even though it was unlikely, there was a possibility," Cramer said. "In order for the outcome to occur, as it did, probably 10 or 15 things happened that all had to go Harvard's way." On the ensuing kickoff, Harvard coach John Yovicsin called for an onside kick, and sophomore Bill Kelly recovered a Yale fumble.

The final drive of the game began at the Yale 49-yard line. On the first play, Champi again escaped pressure and scrambled for a 14-yard run to the Yale 35. A costly face-mask penalty against Yale advanced the ball to the 20-yard line, leaving 32 seconds on the clock. After two incomplete passes, Harvard called a surprising draw play on third down, with Crim gaining 14 yards to the Yale 6-yard line. After a sack for a loss of two yards, Harvard faced second-and-goal from the Yale 8-yard line with four seconds on the clock, only enough time for one play.

As time expired on the final play, Champi was forced to scramble again. He was hit by a Bulldog defender but completed a pass to Gatto at the goal line. With no time remaining on the game clock, Gatto fell backwards into the endzone to bring the score to 29–27. After the game, Champi, who also threw javelin for Harvard, said, "I thought the pass to Vic Gatto went high. I just threw it in his general direction." Gatto, who had injured his left knee earlier in the game, said, "I knew I just had to love it. Just take it in my arms and love it." Fans immediately stormed the field and had to be cleared for the two-point conversion attempt. On the ensuing attempt, Champi completed a pass to Pete Varney on a slant route in the endzone to end the game in a tie, 29–29.

After the game, the Harvard Crimson band played, "Where, Oh Where Has My Little Dog Gone?"

== Aftermath and legacy ==
The tie gave Harvard its first undefeated season since 1920, and Harvard and Yale were awarded a shared Ivy League title. It was the first tie in the rivalry since 1951. Subsequent rule changes have eliminated ties from college football; as a result, this was the final tie game in the Harvard–Yale series.

The game immediately made some of the players involved national celebrities; Dowling and Champi would appear together on The Dating Game in 1969.

=== Harvard Crimson headline ===
The game's impact on popular culture and the Harvard–Yale rivalry was enhanced by the headline "Harvard Beats Yale, 29–29," which ran in the Monday edition of The Harvard Crimson, the undergraduate college's student newspaper.

Peter Lennon, a sophomore, had been assigned to cover the game for The Crimson. On Saturday afternoon, immediately following the game, Lennon reported on the enthusiasm inside Harvard Stadium in a one-page extra. According to Bill Kutik, an editor for the Crimson at the time, the production of the extra and the understanding that everyone knew the score by Sunday allowed the editors to take more creative liberties with its Monday paper. James M. Fallows, then serving as president of the newspaper, has credited editor Timothy G. Carlson with proposing the iconic headline. When editors protested that it was not factually accurate, Kutik described the comeback and convinced them that the headline accurately described the emotions inside the stadium.

The headline was immediately well-received by the Harvard players and students. According to Kutik, The Boston Globe named it the headline of the year.

The famous Crimson headline was used as the title for a 2008 documentary about this game directed by Kevin Rafferty. Crimson guard Tommy Lee Jones, who had gone on to a long and prestigious acting career in Hollywood, was interviewed for the documentary. Meryl Streep, who was dating Bob Levin at the time of his costly fumble, also appeared in the documentary.

=== Legacy ===
In 2010, ESPN ranked it ninth in its list of the top ten college football ties of all time.

In 2024, The Harvard Crimson ranked it as the greatest game in the 149-year history of the Harvard–Yale football rivalry.

== See also ==
- 1968 NCAA University Division football season
- Harvard–Yale football rivalry
- List of nicknamed college football games and plays
- Brian Dowling (Yale quarterback)
- Frank Champi (Harvard quarterback)
- Tommy Lee Jones (Harvard tackle)
