= Harvard Beats Yale 29–29 =

- Directed by: Kevin Rafferty
- Produced by: Kevin Rafferty
- Starring: Tommy Lee Jones; Brian Dowling
- Cinematography: Kevin Rafferty
- Edited by: Kevin Rafferty
- Production company: Kevin Rafferty Productions
- Distributed by: Gravitas Ventures; Kino International
- Release date: September 5, 2008
- Running time: 105 minutes
- Country: United States
- Language: English

Harvard Beats Yale 29–29 is a 2008 documentary film by Kevin Rafferty, covering the 1968 meeting between the football teams of Yale and Harvard in their storied rivalry. The game has been called "the most famous football game in Ivy League history". Actor Tommy Lee Jones, who was a 1st-team All-Ivy League guard for Harvard that season, was interviewed for the documentary.

== Story ==
For the first time since 1909, the football teams of Harvard and Yale were each undefeated with 6–0 records in their conference (8–0 overall) when they met for their season's final game on November 23, 1968 at Harvard Stadium. Led by their quarterback captain Brian Dowling, nationally-ranked Yale was heavily favored to win and they quickly led the game 22–0. With two minutes remaining on the clock they still led 29–13. As the last seconds ticked down, Harvard, coached by John Yovicsin, tied the game, scoring 16 points in the final 42 seconds. The Harvard Crimson declared victory with a famous headline, "Harvard Beats Yale 29–29," providing the title for Rafferty's documentary.

== Production ==
Created essentially as a one-man production, Rafferty followed a simple production plan by inter-cutting broadcast video of the game with interviews he'd done with close to 50 of the surviving players. The broadcast video was a color kinescope of the WHDH telecast, with Don Gillis doing the play-by-play. The film was set to celebrate the 40th anniversary of the 1968 game between Yale and Harvard.

The documentary includes game footage with contemporary interviews with the men who played that day, as well as contextual commentary about the Vietnam War, the sexual revolution, Garry Trudeau's Yale cartoons, and various players' relationships with George W. Bush (Yale), Al Gore (Harvard), and Meryl Streep (Vassar).

== Cast ==
- Tommy Lee Jones – Harvard guard
- Brian Dowling – Yale quarterback (team captain)
- Don Gillis – sportscaster
- George Bass – Yale tackle
- Frank Champi – Harvard quarterback
- George Lalich – Harvard quarterback
- Gus Crim – Harvard fullback
- Bruce Freeman – Harvard end
- Rick Frisbie – Harvard cornerback
- Vic Gatto – Harvard halfback (team captain)
- Kyle Gee – Yale tackle
- J.P. Goldsmith – Yale safety
- Calvin Hill – Yale halfback (archive footage)
- Ray Hornblower – Harvard halfback
- Ron Kell – Yale defensive back
- Mick Kleber – Yale guard
- Bob Levin – Yale fullback
- Ted Livingston – Yale tackle
- Fred Morris – Yale center
- Ted Skowronski – Harvard center
- Bruce Weinstein – Yale end
- Mike Bouscaren – Yale linebacker
- Robert Dowd – Harvard tackle
- Fritz Reed – Harvard tackle
- Pat Conway – Harvard safety
- Pete Varney – Harvard tight end
- Nick Davidson – Yale halfback
- Jim Gallagher – Yale defensive end
- Fran Gallagher – Yale defensive end
- John Ignacio – Harvard cornerback
- Del Marting – Yale end
- Bruce Weinstein – Yale tight end
- Dick Williams – Yale middle guard
- Jim Reynolds – Harvard halfback
- Pete Hall – Harvard defensive end
- Tom Peacock – Yale tackle
- Joe McKinney – Harvard defensive end
- Rick Berne – Harvard defensive tackle
- Alex MacLean – Harvard middle guard
- Dale Neal – Harvard linebacker
- Gary Farneti – Harvard linebacker
- Rich Mattas – Yale tackle
- Scott Robinson – Yale defensive end
- Tom Wynne – Harvard safety
- Neil Hurley – Harvard cornerback
- Mike Ananis – Harvard cornerback
- John Cramer – Harvard defensive end
- John Waldman – Yale cornerback
- Bill Kelly – Harvard quarterback
- Ken Thomas – Harvard safety
- Brad Lee – Yale guard

== Reception ==
The documentary received numerous positive reviews: Steven Rea of Philadelphia Inquirer wrote "Harvard Beats Yale 29–29 is a comeback story, a classic underdog yarn. But this winning doc also offers serious reflection on how events from our past continue to loom large in our lives - as regrets still counted, as lessons learned, as triumphs that awe and amaze." J. Hoberman of Village Voice wrote "This may or may not be the greatest instance of college football ever played, but Brian's Song, Jerry Maguire, and The Longest Yard notwithstanding, Rafferty's no-frills annotated replay is the best football movie I've ever seen: A particular day in history becomes a moment out of time." Michael Sragow of the Baltimore Sun called the film "Kevin Rafferty's magnum opus". Mark Feeney of Boston Globe called the film "terrifically entertaining". Manohla Dargis of the New York Times found the film to be "preposterously entertaining". Tom Keogh of Seattle Times called it "a delightful documentary". In greater depth, Bob Hoover of Pittsburgh Post-Gazette wrote "Despite his annoying style of lingering a bit too long on his subjects, Rafferty, mainly a TV documentary maker, pries fascinating stories and insights from the now aging players," and Kenneth Turan of Los Angeles Times wrote "A look at the legendary Nov. 23, 1968, game, "Harvard Beats Yale" is both an irresistible human story and as fine a documentary on football as "Hoop Dreams" was on basketball", calling the film "a memorable winner". He further notes that the passage of 40 years allowed a unique perspective as the players spoke about "what was not only the game of their careers but possibly the experience of their lives", and made note of how time led to other celebrity for some of the players, with Tommy Lee Jones becoming an Oscar-winning actor, Brian Dowling becoming the character "B.D." in the Doonesbury comic strip (Garry Trudeau attended Yale), and player Bob Levin remembering dating a Vassar undergraduate named Meryl Streep."

Underscoring that the film had appeal to more than just sports fans, Bruce Eder of All Movie Guide began his review with "it is only fair of this writer to point out that he cares not one whit about, and has not a scintilla of interest in football. Having said that, we can also say, without equivocation, that Kevin Rafferty's Harvard Beats Yale 29–29 is a dazzling, engrossing, must-see piece of film all about...football. Except that it's also about a lot more."

== See also ==
- List of American football films
