= List of Liberty Flames football seasons =

This is a list of seasons completed by the Liberty Flames football team of the National Collegiate Athletic Association (NCAA) Division I Football Bowl Subdivision (FBS). Liberty's first football team was fielded in 1973.

Originally a NAIA team, Liberty moved to the NCAA's Division II in 1981, to Division I-AA (now called the FCS) in 1988, and to the FBS in 2018. Except from 2002 to 2017, when they were members of the Big South Conference, Liberty has been independent of a conference, though they have accepted an invitation to join Conference USA in 2023.

== Seasons ==
Division champions	Conference champions	Bowl Eligible	Undefeated Season

Year	Division	Conference	Overall					Conference						Coach	Final Ranking
Year	Division	Conference	Games	Win	Loss	Tie	Pct.	Games	Win	Loss	Tie	Pct.	Standing	Coach	Final Ranking
1973	NAIA	Independent	6	3	3	0	.500	0	0	0	0		N/A	Lee Royer	
1974	NAIA	Independent	9	5	4	0	.556	0	0	0	0		N/A	John Cartwright	
1975	NAIA	Independent	9	4	5	0	.444	0	0	0	0		N/A	John Cartwright	
1976	NAIA	Independent	10	5	4	1	.550	0	0	0	0		N/A	John Cartwright	
1977	NAIA	Independent	10	3	7	0	.300	0	0	0	0		N/A	Tom Dowling	
1978	NAIA	Independent	10	4	5	1	.450	0	0	0	0		N/A	Tom Dowling	
1979	NAIA	Independent	11	9	1	1	.864	0	0	0	0		N/A	Tom Dowling	
1980	NAIA	Independent	10	7	3	0	.700	0	0	0	0		N/A	Tom Dowling	
1981	II	Independent	10	1	9	0	.100	0	0	0	0		N/A	Tom Dowling	
1982	II	Independent	11	7	4	0	.636	0	0	0	0		N/A	Tom Dowling	
1983	II	Independent	11	2	9	0	.182	0	0	0	0		N/A	Tom Dowling	
1984	II	Independent	11	5	6	0	.455	0	0	0	0		N/A	Morgan Hout	
1985	II	Independent	8	3	4	1	.438	0	0	0	0		N/A	Morgan Hout	
1986	II	Independent	10	1	9	0	.100	0	0	0	0		N/A	Morgan Hout	
1987	II	Independent	10	3	7	0	.300	0	0	0	0		N/A	Morgan Hout	
1988	FCS^{[a]}	Independent	11	8	3	0	.727	0	0	0	0		N/A	Morgan Hout	
1989	FCS^{[a]}	Independent	10	7	3	0	.700	0	0	0	0		N/A	Sam Rutigliano	
1990	FCS^{[a]}	Independent	11	7	4	0	.636	0	0	0	0		N/A	Sam Rutigliano	
1991	FCS^{[a]}	Independent	11	4	7	0	.364	0	0	0	0		N/A	Sam Rutigliano	
1992	FCS^{[a]}	Independent	11	7	4	0	.636	0	0	0	0		N/A	Sam Rutigliano	
1993	FCS^{[a]}	Independent	11	6	5	0	.545	0	0	0	0		N/A	Sam Rutigliano	
1994	FCS^{[a]}	Independent	11	5	6	0	.455	0	0	0	0		N/A	Sam Rutigliano	
1995	FCS^{[a]}	Independent	11	8	3	0	.727	0	0	0	0		N/A	Sam Rutigliano	
1996	FCS^{[a]}	Independent	11	5	6	0	.455	0	0	0	0		N/A	Sam Rutigliano	
1997	FCS^{[a]}	Independent	11	9	2	0	.818	0	0	0	0		N/A	Sam Rutigliano	
1998	FCS^{[a]}	Independent	11	5	6	0	.455	0	0	0	0		N/A	Sam Rutigliano	
1999	FCS^{[a]}	Independent	11	4	7	0	.364	0	0	0	0		N/A	Sam Rutigliano	
2000	FCS^{[a]}	Independent	11	3	8	0	.273	0	0	0	0		N/A	Ken Karcher	
2001	FCS^{[a]}	Independent	11	3	8	0	.273	0	0	0	0		N/A	Ken Karcher	
2002	FCS^{[a]}	Big South	11	2	9	0	.182	3	1	2	0	.333	3rd	Ken Karcher	
2003	FCS^{[a]}	Big South	12	6	6	0	.500	4	3	1	0	.750	2nd	Ken Karcher	
2004	FCS^{[a]}	Big South	11	6	5	0	.545	4	3	1	0	.750	2nd	Ken Karcher	
2005	FCS^{[a]}	Big South	11	1	10	0	.091	4	0	4	0	.000	5th	Ken Karcher	
2006	FCS^{[a]}	Big South	11	6	5	0	.545	4	2	2	0	.500	T-2nd	Danny Rocco	
2007	FCS^{[a]}	Big South	11	8	3	0	.727	4	4	0	0	1.000	1st	Danny Rocco	
2008	FCS^{[a]}	Big South	12	10	2	0	.833	5	5	0	0	1.000	1st	Danny Rocco	#14
2009	FCS^{[a]}	Big South	11	8	3	0	.727	6	5	1	0	.833	T-1st	Danny Rocco	#22
2010	FCS^{[a]}	Big South	11	8	3	0	.727	6	5	1	0	.833	T-1st	Danny Rocco	#21
2011	FCS^{[a]}	Big South	11	7	4	0	.636	6	5	1	0	.833	2nd	Danny Rocco	#25
2012	FCS^{[a]}	Big South	11	6	5	0	.545	6	5	1	0	.833	T-1st	Turner Gill	
2013	FCS^{[a]}	Big South	12	8	4	0	.667	5	4	1	0	.800	T-1st	Turner Gill	
2014	FCS^{[a]}	Big South	14	9	5	0	.642	5	4	1	0	.800	T-1st	Turner Gill	
2015	FCS^{[a]}	Big South	11	6	5	0	.545	6	3	3	0	.500	T-3rd	Turner Gill	
2016	FCS^{[a]}	Big South	11	6	5	0	.545	5	4	1	0	.800	T-1st	Turner Gill	
2017	FCS^{[a]}	Big South	11	6	5	0	.545	5	2	3	0	.400	4th	Turner Gill	
2018	FBS	Independent	12	6	6	0	.500	0	0	0	0		N/A	Turner Gill	
2019	FBS	Independent	13	8	5	0	.615	0	0	0	0		N/A	Hugh Freeze	
2020	FBS	Independent	11	10	1	0	.909	0	0	0	0		N/A	Hugh Freeze	#17
2021	FBS	Independent	13	8	5	0	.615	0	0	0	0		N/A	Hugh Freeze	
2022	FBS	Independent	13	8	5	0	.615	0	0	0	0		N/A	Hugh Freeze	
2023	FBS	Conference USA	13	13	1	0	.928	8	8	0	0	1.000	1st	Jamey Chadwell	#25
2024	FBS	Conference USA	12	8	4	0	.666	8	5	3	0	.625	4th	Jamey Chadwell	
2025	FBS	Conference USA	12	4	8	0	.333	8	3	5	0	.375	8th	Jamey Chadwell	
	Totals		580	310	267	4	.537	95	65	30	0	.684			

^aThe FCS was known as Division I-AA through the 2005 season.
