= 1977 Liberty Baptist Flames football team =

American college football season

1977 Liberty Baptist Flames football
- Conference: Independent
- Record: 3–7
- Head coach: Tom Dowling (1st season)
- Home stadium: City Stadium

1977 NAIA Division I independents football records
	Conf.			Overall
Team	W	L	T	W		L		T
No. 9 Cameron		–		7	–	1	–	1
No. 16 Kentucky State		–		8	–	2	–	1
Wofford		–		7	–	3	–	1
Langston		–		4	–	5	–	0
Eastern New Mexico		–		4	–	6	–	0
Guilford		–		3	–	7	–	0
Liberty Baptist		–		3	–	7	–	0
Rankings from NAIA Division I poll

The 1977 Liberty Baptist Flames football team represented Liberty Baptist College (now known as Liberty University) as an independent during the 1977 NAIA Division I football season. Led by first-year head coach Tom Dowling, the Flames compiled an overall record of 3–7.

== Schedule ==
Date	Opponent	Site	Result	Attendance	Source
September 10	at Chowan	Garrison Stadium; Murfreesboro, NC	L 13–31		
September 17	Elon	City Stadium; Lynchburg, VA	L 14–38		
September 24	Bowie State	City Stadium; Lynchburg, VA	W 47–0		
October 1	Gardner–Webb	City Stadium; Lynchburg, VA	L 7–22	2,617	
October 8	vs. Hampden–Sydney	J.T. Christopher Stadium; Danville, VA (Festival Bowl)	L 24–44		
October 15	at Bridgewater	Jopson Field; Bridgewater, VA	L 7–10		
October 22	Saint Paul's (VA)	City Stadium; Lynchburg, VA	W 26–9		
October 29	at Lenoir–Rhyne	Moretz Stadium; Hickory, NC	L 0–53		
November 5	at Ferrum	W. B. Adams Stadium; Ferrum, VA	L 0–25		
November 12	Susquehanna	City Stadium; Lynchburg, VA	W 29–28		
