= 1978 Liberty Baptist Flames football team =

American college football season

1978 Liberty Baptist Flames football
- Conference: Independent
- Record: 4–5–1
- Head coach: Tom Dowling (2nd season)
- Home stadium: City Stadium

1978 NAIA Division I independents football records
	Conf.			Overall
Team	W	L	T	W		L		T
No. 15 Cameron		–		7	–	2	–	1
No. 14 Kentucky State		–		7	–	2	–	1
Guilford		–		5	–	4	–	0
Eastern New Mexico		–		5	–	6	–	0
Liberty Baptist		–		4	–	5	–	1
Langston		–		3	–	7	–	0
Wofford		–		3	–	8	–	0
Rankings from NAIA Division I poll

The 1978 Liberty Baptist Flames football team represented Liberty Baptist College (now known as Liberty University) as an independent during the 1978 NAIA Division I football season. Led by second-year head coach Tom Dowling, the Flames compiled an overall record of 4–5–1.

== Schedule ==
Date	Opponent	Site	Result	Attendance	Source
September 1	at Dayton	Welcome Stadium; Dayton, OH	L 0–35	10,133	
September 9	Mars Hill	City Stadium; Lynchburg, VA	L 16–29		
September 16	Catawba	City Stadium; Lynchburg, VA	L 16–52		
September 23	at Bowie State	Bulldogs Stadium; Bowie, MD	W 14–13		
September 30	at Gardner–Webb	Ernest W. Spangler Stadium; Boiling Springs, NC	T 20–20		
October 7	Hampden–Sydney	City Stadium; Lynchburg, VA	L 7–18	1,000	
October 14	vs. Bridgewater	Victory Stadium; Roanoke, VA	W 21–13		
October 21	at Saint Paul's (VA)	Russell Field; Lawrenceville, VA	W 34–28		
October 28	Lenoir–Rhyne	City Stadium; Lynchburg, VA	L 16–28		
November 4	Ferrum	City Stadium; Lynchburg, VA	W 42–28	3,529	
