= 1975 Lynchburg Baptist Flames football team =

American college football season

1975 Lynchburg Baptist Flames football
- Conference: Independent
- Record: 4–5
- Head coach: John Cartwright (2nd season)
- Home stadium: City Stadium

The 1975 Lynchburg Baptist Flames football team represented Lynchburg Baptist College (now known as Liberty University) as an independent during the 1975 NAIA Division I football season. Led by second-year head coach John Cartwright, the Flames compiled an overall record of 4–5.

== Schedule ==
Date	Opponent	Site	Result	Source
September 13	Saint Paul's (VA)	City Stadium; Lynchburg, VA	W 24–17	
September 20	at Gallaudet	Hotchkiss Field; Washington D.C.	W 43–0	
September 26	at Virginia Tech JV	Lane Stadium; Blacksburg, VA	W 28–15	
October 4	at Massanutten Military Academy	Massanutten Military Academy; Woodstock, VA	L 6–7	
October 11	at Apprentice	Apprentice Athletic Field; Newport News, VA	W 27–6	
October 18	Bridgewater^{†}	City Stadium; Lynchburg, VA	L 6–8	
October 25	Chowan	City Stadium; Lynchburg, VA	L 6–28	
November 1	Bowie State	City Stadium; Lynchburg, VA	L 0–36	
November 8	at Ferrum	W. B. Adams Stadium; Ferrum, VA	L 7–31	
^{†}Homecoming
