= 1976 Liberty Baptist Flames football team =

American college football season

1976 Liberty Baptist Flames football
- Conference: Independent
- Record: 5–4–1
- Head coach: John Cartwright (3rd season)
- Home stadium: City Stadium

1976 NAIA Division I independents football records
	Conf.			Overall
Team	W	L	T	W		L		T
No. 18 Eastern New Mexico		–		7	–	3	–	1
Liberty Baptist		–		5	–	4	–	1
Langston		–		4	–	4	–	1
Guilford		–		4	–	6	–	0
Cameron		–		4	–	7	–	0
Wofford		–		4	–	7	–	0
Kentucky State		–		3	–	7	–	1
Rankings from NAIA Division I poll

The 1976 Liberty Baptist Flames football team represented Liberty Baptist College (now known as Liberty University) as an independent during the 1976 NAIA Division I football season. Led by third-year head coach John Cartwright, the Flames compiled an overall record of 5–4–1.

== Schedule ==
Date	Opponent	Site	Result	Attendance	Source
September 4	vs. Hampden–Sydney	J.T. Christopher Stadium; Danville, VA (Old Belt Bowl)	L 6–14		
September 11	Chowan	Stinger Stadium; Lynchburg, VA	T 20–20	4,000	
September 18	at Elon	Burlington Memorial Stadium; Burlington, NC	L 15–56	7,000	
September 25	Gallaudet^{†}	City Stadium; Lynchburg, VA	W 47–0		
October 2	at Gardner–Webb	Ernest W. Spangler Stadium; Boiling Springs, NC	L 16–54		
October 16	at Bridgewater	Jopson Field; Bridgewater, VA	W 24–13		
October 23	at Saint Paul's (VA)	Russell Field; Lawrenceville, VA	W 24–21	200	
October 30	at Bowie State	Bulldogs Stadium; Bowie, MD	W 27–0	1,500	
November 13	Ferrum	City Stadium; Lynchburg, VA	L 16–17		
November 20	Apprentice	City Stadium; Lynchburg, VA	W 68–3	1,500	
^{†}Homecoming
