= 1979 Liberty Baptist Flames football team =

American college football season

1979 Liberty Baptist Flames football
- Conference: Independent
- Record: 9–1–1
- Head coach: Tom Dowling (3rd season)
- Home stadium: City Stadium

1979 NAIA Division I independents football records
	Conf.			Overall
Team	W	L	T	W		L		T
Liberty Baptist		–		9	–	1	–	1
No. 5 Central State (OK) ^		–		11	–	2	–	0
Kentucky State		–		6	–	5	–	0
Wofford		–		5	–	5	–	0
Guilford		–		4	–	5	–	0
Eastern New Mexico		–		4	–	6	–	0
Cameron		–		3	–	7	–	0
Langston		–		1	–	8	–	0
^ – NAIA Division I playoff participant; Rankings from NAIA Division I poll

The 1979 Liberty Baptist Flames football team represented Liberty Baptist College (now known as Liberty University) as an independent during the 1979 NAIA Division I football season. Led by third-year head coach Tom Dowling, the Flames compiled an overall record of 9–1–1.

== Schedule ==
Date	Opponent	Site	Result	Attendance	Source
September 1	Hampton	City Stadium; Lynchburg, VA	W 41–20		
September 8	at Mars Hill	Meares Stadium; Mars Hill, NC	T 21–21	2,500	
September 15	at Catawba	Shuford Stadium; Salisbury, NC	W 21–14		
September 22	Bowie State	City Stadium; Lynchburg, VA	W 21–0	1,735	
September 29	vs. Gardner–Webb	Victory Stadium; Roanoke, VA	W 29–32 (forfeit win)	2,200	
October 6	at Georgetown (KY)	Hinton Field; Georgetown, KY	W 42–17		
October 13	at Lenoir–Rhyne	Moretz Stadium; Hickory, NC	L 21–26		
October 20	Saint Paul's (VA)^{†}	City Stadium; Lynchburg, VA	W 44–0		
October 27	Dayton	City Stadium; Lynchburg, VA	W 17–10		
November 3	vs. Ferrum	Victory Stadium; Roanoke, VA (Shrine Bowl)	W 48–26	7,000	
November 11	Canisius	City Stadium; Lynchburg, VA	W 17–10		
^{†}Homecoming
