= 1974 Lynchburg Baptist Flames football team =

American college football season

1974 Lynchburg Baptist Flames football
- Conference: Independent
- Record: 5–4
- Head coach: John Cartwright (1st season)
- Home stadium: City Stadium

The 1974 Lynchburg Baptist Flames football team represented Lynchburg Baptist College (now known as Liberty University) as an independent during the 1974 NAIA Division I football season. Led by first-year head coach John Cartwright, the Flames compiled an overall record of 5–4.

== Schedule ==
Date	Opponent	Site	Result	Source
September 23	Washington and Lee JV	City Stadium; Lynchburg, VA	W 30–10	
September 28	United States Military Prep School	City Stadium; Lynchburg, VA	L 13–14	
October 5	Shepherd JV	City Stadium; Lynchburg, VA	W 28–6	
October 12	vs. Hampden–Sydney JV	South Boston, VA	L 13–17	
October 19	Apprentice	City Stadium; Lynchburg, VA	W 33–0	
October 26	at Chowan	Garrison Stadium; Murfreesboro, NC	L 8–25	
November 2	Massanutten Military Academy^{†}	City Stadium; Lynchburg, VA	W 19–0	
November 8	at Hargrave Military Academy	Ringgold, VA	W 1–0 (Hargrave forfeit)	
November 16	Ferrum	City Stadium; Lynchburg, VA	L 7–14	
^{†}Homecoming
