= 1980 Liberty Baptist Flames football team =

American college football season

1980 Liberty Baptist Flames football
- Conference: Independent
- Record: 7–3
- Head coach: Tom Dowling (4th season)
- Offensive coordinator: Nick O'Grady (1st season)
- Defensive coordinator: Theo Caldwell (1st season)
- Home stadium: City Stadium

1980 NAIA Division I independents football records
	Conf.			Overall
Team	W	L	T	W		L		T
No. 17 Cameron		–		8	–	3	–	0
No. 15 Wofford		–		7	–	2	–	2
Liberty Baptist		–		7	–	3	–	0
Guilford		–		6	–	3	–	0
Central State (OK)		–		5	–	4	–	0
Kentucky State		–		5	–	6	–	0
Eastern New Mexico		–		2	–	7	–	1
Langston		–		1	–	8	–	0
Rankings from NAIA Division I poll

The 1980 Liberty Baptist Flames football team represented Liberty Baptist College (now known as Liberty University) as an independent during the 1980 NAIA Division I football season. Led by fourth-year head coach Tom Dowling, the Flames compiled an overall record of 7–3.

== Schedule ==
Date	Opponent	Site	Result	Attendance	Source
September 6	Mars Hill	City Stadium; Lynchburg, VA	L 0–7		
September 13	Catawba	City Stadium; Lynchburg, VA	W 35–14		
September 20	Bowie State	City Stadium; Lynchburg, VA	W 35–0	4,749	
October 4	UNAM	City Stadium; Lynchburg, VA	W 41–12		
October 11	at James Madison	Madison Stadium; Harrisonburg, VA	L 14–30		
October 18	at Gardner–Webb	Ernest W. Spangler Stadium; Boiling Springs, NC	W 15–14		
October 25	Lenoir–Rhyne	City Stadium; Lynchburg, VA (Shrine Bowl)	W 45–25		
November 1	at C. W. Post	Hickox Field; Greenvale, NY	L 13–30		
November 8	Morehead State	City Stadium; Lynchburg, VA	W 23–20	7,126	
November 15	Hampton	City Stadium; Lynchburg, VA	W 51–18	983	
