= 1981 Liberty Baptist Flames football team =

American college football season

1981 Liberty Baptist Flames football
- Conference: Independent
- Record: 1–9
- Head coach: Tom Dowling (5th season)
- Home stadium: City Stadium

1981 NAIA Division I independents football records
	Conf.			Overall
Team	W	L	T	W		L		T
No. 7 Cameron ^		–		5	–	5	–	0
Central State (OK)		–		7	–	2	–	0
Wofford		–		6	–	5	–	0
Eastern New Mexico		–		5	–	5	–	0
Guilford		–		5	–	5	–	0
Kentucky State		–		2	–	6	–	0
Liberty Baptist		–		1	–	9	–	0
Langston		–		0	–	10	–	0
^ – NAIA Division I playoff participant; Rankings from NAIA Division I poll

The 1981 Liberty Baptist Flames football team represented Liberty Baptist College (now known as Liberty University) as an independent during the 1981 NAIA Division I football season. Led by fifth-year head coach Tom Dowling, the Flames compiled an overall record of 1–9.

== Schedule ==
Date	Opponent	Site	Result	Attendance	Source
September 5	at Mars Hill	Meares Stadium; Mars Hill, NC	L 10–17	3,000–3,118	
September 12	at Catawba	Shuford Stadium; Salisbury, NC	L 22–30	3,418	
September 19	Carson–Newman	City Stadium; Lynchburg, VA	L 6–21	7,811	
September 26	James Madison	City Stadium; Lynchburg, VA	L 14–36	8,427	
October 3	Gardner–Webb	City Stadium; Lynchburg, VA	L 9–14	6,147	
October 10	at Delta State	Delta Field; Cleveland, MS	L 8–31	3,100	
October 17	at No. 10 Jacksonville State	Paul Snow Stadium; Jacksonville, AL	L 0–64	11,000–11,038	
October 24	at Furman	Paladin Stadium; Greenville, SC	L 14–38	9,250	
November 7	at Morehead State	Jayne Stadium; Morehead, KY	L 10–34	2,500	
November 14	Evangel	City Stadium; Lynchburg, VA	W 42–23	2,156	
Rankings from NCAA Division II Football Committee Poll released prior to the game
