= 1982 Liberty Baptist Flames football team =

American college football season

1982 Liberty Baptist Flames football
- Conference: Independent
- Record: 7–4
- Head coach: Tom Dowling (6th season)
- Home stadium: City Stadium

1982 NAIA Division I independents football records
	Conf.			Overall
Team	W	L	T	W		L		T
No. 7 Central State (OK) ^		–		10	–	2	–	0
No. 9 Wofford		–		8	–	3	–	0
No. 19 Liberty Baptist		–		7	–	4	–	0
Guilford		–		5	–	5	–	0
Cameron		–		4	–	5	–	0
Eastern New Mexico		–		4	–	6	–	0
Kentucky State		–		2	–	9	–	0
Langston		–		0	–	10	–	0
^ – NAIA Division I playoff participant; Rankings from NAIA Division I poll

The 1982 Liberty Baptist Flames football team represented Liberty Baptist College (now known as Liberty University) as an independent during the 1982 NAIA Division I football season. Led by sixth-year head coach Tom Dowling, the Flames compiled an overall record of 7–4.

== Schedule ==
Date	Opponent	Site	Result	Attendance	Source
September 4	Delta State	City Stadium; Lynchburg, VA	L 13–16	8,832	
September 11	at Carson–Newman	Burke–Tarr Stadium; Jefferson City, TN	L 10–31	4,700	
September 18	at Middle Tennessee	Johnny "Red" Floyd Stadium; Murfreesboro, TN	L 7–27	4,000	
September 25	No. 8 (D-II) Jacksonville State	City Stadium; Lynchburg, VA	L 13–42	4,731	
October 2	Central State (OH)	City Stadium; Lynchburg, VA	W 31–15	2,287	
October 9	at Evangel	JFK Stadium; Springfield, MO	W 35–19	5,200	
October 23	Saginaw Valley State	City Stadium; Lynchburg, VA	W 35–7	1,923	
October 30	at Presbyterian	Bailey Stadium; Clinton, SC	W 24–12	3,974	
November 6	Morehead State	City Stadium; Lynchburg, VA	W 13–10	6,147	
November 13	IUP	City Stadium; Lynchburg, VA	W 35–13	1,856	
November 20	at Delaware State	Alumni Stadium; Dover, DE	W 35–22	2,500	
Rankings from Coaches' Poll released prior to the game
