= 2023 Delaware State Hornets football team =

American college football season

2023 Delaware State Hornets football
- Conference: Mid-Eastern Athletic Conference
- Record: 1–10 (0–5 MEAC)
- Head coach: Lee Hull (1st season)
- Defensive coordinator: Darrell Wilson (1st season)
- Home stadium: Alumni Stadium

2023 Mid-Eastern Athletic Conference football standings
	Conf.			Overall
Team	W		L	W		L
Howard +	4	–	1	6	–	6
No. 20 North Carolina Central +^	4	–	1	9	–	3
South Carolina State	3	–	2	5	–	6
Morgan State	3	–	2	4	–	6
Norfolk State	1	–	4	3	–	8
Delaware State	0	–	5	1	–	10
+ – Conference co-champions; ^ – FCS playoff participant; Rankings from STATS Poll

The 2023 Delaware State Hornets football team represented Delaware State University as a member of the Mid-Eastern Athletic Conference (MEAC) during the 2023 NCAA Division I FCS football season. The Hornets, led by first-year head coach Lee Hull, played their home games at Alumni Stadium in Dover, Delaware.

== Schedule ==
Date	Time	Opponent	Site	TV	Result	Attendance
September 2	1:00 p.m.	Bowie State*	Alumni Stadium; Dover, DE	ESPN+	L 11–22	6,295
September 9	12:00 p.m.	at Army*	Michie Stadium; West Point, NY	CBSSN	L 0–57	25,153
September 16	3:30 p.m.	at Richmond*	E. Claiborne Robins Stadium; Richmond, VA	FloSports	L 6–38	4,936
September 23	3:30 p.m.	at Miami (OH)*	Yager Stadium; Oxford, Ohio	ESPN+	L 20–62	15,812
September 30	1:00 p.m.	Virginia–Lynchburg*	Alumni Stadium; Dover, DE	ESPN+	W 48–17	3,597
October 7	1:00 p.m.	at Central Connecticut*	Arute Field; New Britain, CT	NEC Front Row	L 44–51	3,872
October 21	12:00 p.m.	South Carolina State^{†}	Alumni Stadium; Dover, DE	ESPN+	L 7–35	6,300
October 28	12:00 p.m.	Howard	Alumni Stadium; Dover, DE	ESPN+	L 10–17	5,386
November 4	1:00 p.m.	at Morgan State	Hughes Stadium; Baltimore, MD	ESPN+	L 17–24	4,578
November 11	12:00 p.m.	Norfolk State	Alumni Stadium; Dover, DE	ESPN+	L 21–44	3,467
November 18	2:00 p.m.	at No. 17 North Carolina Central	O'Kelly-Riddick Stadium; Durham, NC	ESPN+	L 14–55	6,018
*Non-conference game; ^{†}Homecoming; Rankings from STATS Poll released prior to the game; All times are in Eastern time
