= The Spirit of the Mountain =

Marching band

- School: Liberty University
- Location: Lynchburg, Virginia, US
- Conference: Conference USA
- Founded: 1977
- Director: Larry Seipp
- Assistant Director: Josh Detwiler
- Members: 250
- Fight song: "Fan the Flames!"
- Website: Liberty University Marching Band: The Spirit of the Mountain

The Spirit of the Mountain (SOTM) is the marching band of Liberty University in Lynchburg, Virginia, United States. The ensemble performs at home football games and other campus events. It has appeared at national events including the 2024 Vrbo Fiesta Bowl in Glendale, Arizona, the planned 60th Presidential Inaugural Parade in January 2025, and the Xfinity 500 in October 2025.

== History ==
The Liberty University Marching Band began "unofficially" as a student-sponsor-led group of musicians in the Fall of 1974. Liberty played their football games at Lynchburg City Stadium. The band's official "first year" was 1977, under the direction of Raymond Locy. It began with only 48 students, and they practiced at Thomas Road Baptist Church in the lower parking lot. They did not have uniforms in the first year. By 1978, the band performed in their LBC Red, Royal Blue, and White uniforms with white "Q-tip" hats.

The band has grown from this small ensemble to a 250-member drum corps influenced marching band that includes brass, woodwinds, drumline and front ensemble, accented by a full color guard. Members audition by video and receive a scholarship once accepted.

== Notable performances ==
As Liberty Baptist College, the band performed in the 1983 Macy's Thanksgiving Day Parade.

The Liberty University Marching Band performed in exhibition for the Atlanta Bands of America Super-Regional in 2014 and later hosted the 2019 Virginia Bands of America Regional. Since 2016, the SOTM band has hosted the VMBC State Championships at Williams Stadium.

The band has traveled to support Flames Nation for the 2019 Cure Bowl, the 2021 Lending Tree Bowl, the 2022 Boca Raton Bowl, and the 2024 Fiesta Bowl in Glendale, AZ.

In 2024, the SOTM was chosen to march in the 2025 Presidential Inaugural Parade in Washington, D.C. Due to extreme cold, the parade was cancelled and the band did not perform.

The band performed the National Anthem for the Xfinity 500 in October 2025.

== Pep band ==
During the basketball season, the SOTM Pep Band, performs at all home Flames games. If the men's and/or women's team plays in a postseason tournament, the band travels with them as well. The Pep Band is open to all members of the marching band and has a separate audition.

== Game Day ==
=== FanFest ===
Before every home game, the band performs at the Liberty Football "Fan Fest." The drumline begins at 65 minutes before kickoff, and the band joins them at 50 minutes before kickoff. They perform a multitude of different arrangements at Fan Fest, but the list will always include the Liberty University fight song ("Fan the Flames") and the band's traditional hymn Be Thou My Vision.

=== Pregame ===
The band's Pregame performance is full of tradition, and though it features several new arrangements each year, it always includes:

- Songs:
  - Fight Song
  - Alma Mater: "Champions Arise"
  - "Star Spangled Banner"
  - "Ain't No Mountain High Enough"
- Drill Sets:
  - "GO LU"
  - The LU Monogram
  - USA
  - Script Liberty
    - Dotting of the "i"
  - Team Tunnel

=== Halftime ===
The Spirit of the Mountain performs two halftime shows each year, the first being an elaborate corps style show with over 75 drill sets and 8-10 minutes of music, completed in stages over the first several home games. The second show is a military appreciation halftime performance featuring the songs of all six branches of the US military complemented with matching drill formations.

=== Postgame ===
The SOTM performs the Fight Song and following, the traditional Alma Mater "Champions Arise" with the remaining fans and the football team.
