= 1983 Liberty Baptist Flames football team =

American college football season

1983 Liberty Baptist Flames football
- Conference: Independent
- Record: 2–9
- Head coach: Tom Dowling (7th season)
- Home stadium: City Stadium

1983 NAIA Division I independents football records
	Conf.			Overall
Team	W	L	T	W		L		T
No. 2 Central State (OK) ^		–		8	–	1	–	1
No. 6 Eastern New Mexico ^		–		8	–	2	–	1
Guilford		–		5	–	4	–	1
Wofford		–		6	–	5	–	0
Langston		–		4	–	6	–	0
Cameron		–		3	–	6	–	0
Arkansas-Pine Bluff		–		2	–	7	–	1
Kentucky State		–		2	–	7	–	2
Liberty Baptist		–		2	–	9	–	0
^ – NAIA Division I playoff participant; Rankings from NAIA Division I poll

The 1983 Liberty Baptist Flames football team represented Liberty Baptist College (now known as Liberty University) as an independent during the 1983 NAIA Division I football season. Led by seventh-year head coach Tom Dowling, the Flames compiled an overall record of 2–9.

== Schedule ==
Date	Opponent	Site	Result	Attendance	Source
September 3	Howard	City Stadium; Lynchburg, VA	W 15–10	5,321	
September 10	at Saginaw Valley State	Wickes Stadium; University Center, MI	L 15–18	1,236	
September 17	Towson State	City Stadium; Lynchburg, VA	L 3–13	4,340	
September 24	at No. T–20 James Madison	JMU Stadium; Harrisonburg, VA	L 35–44	6,000	
October 1	at Central State (OH)	McPherson Stadium; Wilberforce, OH	L 16–66	4,700	
October 8	Virginia State	City Stadium; Lynchburg, VA	W 14–2	3,200	
October 22	No. 15 Delaware State	City Stadium; Lynchburg, VA	L 24–48	850	
October 29	Presbyterian	City Stadium; Lynchburg, VA	L 9–29	3,200	
November 5	at Morehead State	Jayne Stadium; Morehead, KY	L 16–24	1,800	
November 12	at Wofford	Synder Field; Spartanburg, SC	L 27–35	4,218	
November 19	West Georgia	City Stadium; Lynchburg, VA	L 7–28		
Rankings from NCAA Division I-AA Football Committee Poll released prior to the game
