= 2023 Morgan State Bears football team =

College football season

2023 Morgan State Bears football
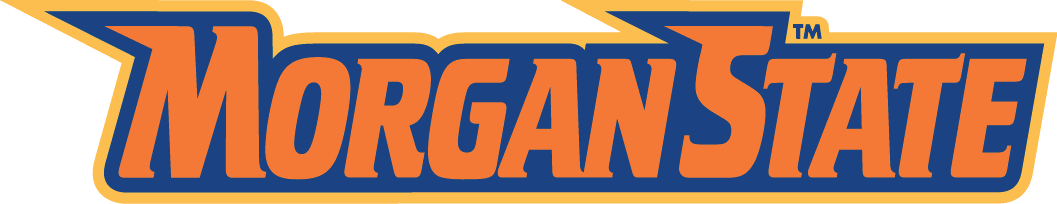
- Conference: Mid-Eastern Athletic Conference
- Record: 4–6 (3–2 MEAC)
- Head coach: Damon Wilson (2nd season)
- Offensive coordinator: B. T. Sherman (2nd season)
- Defensive coordinator: Antone' Sewell (2nd season)
- Home stadium: Hughes Stadium

2023 Mid-Eastern Athletic Conference football standings
| | Conf. | | | Overall |
| Team | W | | L | W | | L |
|---|---|---|---|---|---|---|
| Howard + | 4 | – | 1 | 6 | – | 6 |
| No. 20 North Carolina Central +^ | 4 | – | 1 | 9 | – | 3 |
| South Carolina State | 3 | – | 2 | 5 | – | 6 |
| Morgan State | 3 | – | 2 | 4 | – | 6 |
| Norfolk State | 1 | – | 4 | 3 | – | 8 |
| Delaware State | 0 | – | 5 | 1 | – | 10 |
+ – Conference co-champions; ^ – FCS playoff participant; Rankings from STATS Poll

The 2023 Morgan State Bears football team represented Morgan State University as a member of the Mid-Eastern Athletic Conference (MEAC) during the 2023 NCAA Division I FCS football season. The Bears were led by second-year head coach Damon Wilson, and played their home games at Hughes Stadium in Baltimore.

== Schedule ==
| Date | Time | Opponent | Site | TV | Result | Attendance | Source |
|---|---|---|---|---|---|---|---|
| September 2 | 6:00 p.m. | at No. 18 Richmond* | E. Claiborne Robins Stadium; Richmond, VA | FloSports | W 17–10 | 6,603 | |
| September 9 | 6:00 p.m. | at Akron* | InfoCision Stadium; Akron, OH | ESPN+ | L 21–24 | 8,213 | |
| September 16 | 6:00 p.m. | Towson* | Hughes Stadium; Baltimore, MD | ESPN+ | L 10–20 | 9,867 | |
| September 23 | 6:00 p.m. | Albany* | Hughes Stadium; Baltimore, MD | ESPN+ | L 17–23 ^{OT} | 1,175 | |
| September 30 | 12:00 p.m. | at Yale* | Yale Bowl; New Haven, CT | ESPN+ | L 3–45 | 7,960 | |
| October 7 | 1:00 p.m. | Stony Brook*^{†} | Hughes Stadium; Baltimore, MD | ESPN+ | Canceled | | |
| October 19 | 7:30 p.m. | No. 16 North Carolina Central | Hughes Stadium; Baltimore, MD | ESPNU | L 10–16 | 4,678 | |
| October 28 | 2:00 p.m. | at Norfolk State | William "Dick" Price Stadium; Norfolk, VA | ESPN+ | W 32–28 | 24,976 | |
| November 4 | 1:00 p.m. | Delaware State | Hughes Stadium; Baltimore, MD | ESPN+ | W 24–17 | 4,578 | |
| November 11 | 12:00 p.m. | at South Carolina State | Oliver C. Dawson Stadium; Orangeburg, SC | ESPN+ | W 20–17 | 4,569 | |
| November 18 | 1:00 p.m. | Howard | Hughes Stadium; Baltimore, MD | ESPN+ | L 7–14 | 6,491 | |
*Non-conference game; ^{†}Homecoming; Rankings from STATS Poll released prior to the game; All times are in Eastern time
