= John Cartwright (American football) =

American football player and pastor (born 1946)

Biographical details
- Born: May 5, 1946 (age 80)

Playing career
- 1964–1967: Navy
- Position: Quarterback

Coaching career (HC unless noted)
- 1973: Lynchburg Baptist (assistant)
- 1974–1976: Lynchburg/Liberty Baptist

Head coaching record
- Overall: 14–13–1

Accomplishments and honors

Awards
- Second-team All-East (1967)

John B. Cartwright (born May 5, 1946) is an American Baptist pastor who first achieved acclaim as a record-setting quarterback at the United States Naval Academy in the 1960s. After a tour of duty in Vietnam, he became head football coach at Lynchburg Baptist College (now called Liberty University) while attending seminary at the school in Virginia. He then left football to start a church in Philadelphia, Pennsylvania that he has pastored for over three decades.

== Playing career ==
Cartwright followed Roger Staubach as starting quarterback for the United States Naval Academy as a sophomore in 1965. He led the Midshipmen to some of their finest seasons including a 1967 season that including victories over Penn State, Syracuse, and Army. In the process, he broke 13 of Staubach's school records and set seven others of his own.

== Coaching career ==
Cartwright spent one season in 1973 as an assistant coach at what is now called Liberty University under Lee Royer. But after Royer died in a plane crash, Cartwright was named the school's second ever head coach and he spent three seasons leading the Flames.

== Career at Baptist minister ==
Cartwright founded Calvary Independent Baptist Church in the Philadelphia community of Morton, Pennsylvania, in 1977 shortly after graduating from Liberty Baptist Seminary. He remains the only senior pastor of the church after over 30 years. He also began Calvary International Christian School as a ministry of the church.

== Head coaching record ==
| Year | Team | Overall | Conference | Standing | Bowl/playoffs |
|---|---|---|---|---|---|
Lynchburg Baptist / Liberty Baptist Flames (Independent) (1974–1976)
| 1974 | Lynchburg Baptist | 5–4 | | | |
| 1975 | Lynchburg Baptist | 4–5 | | | |
| 1976 | Liberty Baptist | 5–4–1 | | | |
| Lynchburg Baptist / Liberty Baptist: | | 14–13–1 | | | |
| Total: | | 14–13–1 | | | |
