= Damon Wilson (American football) =

American football coach

Current position
- Title: Head coach
- Team: Morgan State
- Conference: MEAC
- Record: 18–27

Playing career
- 1997–1998: Bowie State

Coaching career (HC unless noted)
- 1999–2003: Bowie State (assistant)
- 2004–2006: Texas Southern (assistant)
- 2007: Bowie State (RB/ST)
- 2008: Prairie View A&M (RB)
- 2009–2021: Bowie State
- 2022–present: Morgan State

Head coaching record
- Overall: 107–72 (.598)
- Tournaments: NCAA D-II playoffs: 3–5 (.375)

Accomplishments and honors

Championships
- 2 black college national (2018–2019); 3 CIAA (2018–2019, 2021); 7 CIAA Northern Division (2009–2010, 2015–2016, 2018–2019, 2021)

Awards
- 3× CIAA Coach of the Year (2015, 2019, 2021)

Damon Wilson is an American college football coach. He is the head football coach at Morgan State University in Baltimore. Wilson was previously the head football coach at Bowie State University in Bowie, Maryland for 12 years, from 2009 through May 2022. Wilson played college football at Bowie State, earning all-Central Intercollegiate Athletic Association (CIAA) honors in 1997 and 1998.

== Head coaching record ==
Year	Team	Overall	Conference	Standing	Bowl/playoffs	AFCA^{#}
Bowie State Bulldogs (Central Intercollegiate Athletic Association) (2009–2021)
2009	Bowie State	6–5	5–2	T–1st (Northern)		
2010	Bowie State	6–4	6–1	T–1st (Northern)		
2011	Bowie State	4–6	3–4	T–3rd (Northern)		
2012	Bowie State	5–5	2–5	5th (Northern)		
2013	Bowie State	5–5	3–4	T–3rd (Northern)		
2014	Bowie State	5–5	5–2	T–2nd (Northern)		
2015	Bowie State	9–3	7–0	1st (Northern)	L NCAA Division II First Round	
2016	Bowie State	7–4	6–1	1st (Northern)		
2017	Bowie State	9–2	6–1	2nd (Northern)	L NCAA Division II First Round	23
2018	Bowie State	10–3	5–1	T–1st (Northern)	L NCAA Division II Second Round	19
2019	Bowie State	11–1	7–0	1st (Northern)	L NCAA Division II First Round	18
2020–21	No team—COVID-19					
2021	Bowie State	12–2	7–0	1st (Northern)	L NCAA Division II Quarterfinal	6
Bowie State:		89–45	62–21			
Morgan State Bears (Mid-Eastern Athletic Conference) (2022–present)
2022	Morgan State	4–7	2–3	T–3rd		
2023	Morgan State	4–6	3–2	T–3rd		
2024	Morgan State	6–6	3–2	3rd		
2025	Morgan State	4–8	1–4	5th		
Morgan State:		18–27	9–11			
Total:		107–72				
National championship Conference title Conference division title or championship game berth
