= 1973 Lynchburg Baptist Flames football team =

American college football season

1973 Lynchburg Baptist Flames football
- Conference: Independent
- Record: 3–3
- Head coach: Lee Royer (1st season)
- Home stadium: City Stadium

The 1973 Lynchburg Baptist Flames football team represented Lynchburg Baptist College (now known as Liberty University) as an independent during the 1973 NAIA Division I football season. Led by first-year head coach Lee Royer, the Flames compiled an overall record of 3–3.

Royer died on November 20 in a plane crash.

== Schedule ==
Date	Opponent	Site	Result	Source
September 26	Massanutten Military Academy	City Stadium; Lynchburg, VA	L 32–42	
October 4	at United States Military Prep School	Fort Belvoir, VA	L 7–35	
October 18	at Apprentice	Apprentice Athletic Field; Newport News, VA	L 13–19	
October 25	Ferrum JV	City Stadium; Lynchburg, VA	W 29–7	
November 1	Hampden–Sydney JV	City Stadium; Lynchburg, VA	W 20–6	
November 8	Hargrave Military Academy	City Stadium; Lynchburg, VA	W 29–6	
