= Khari Lee =

American football player (born 1992)

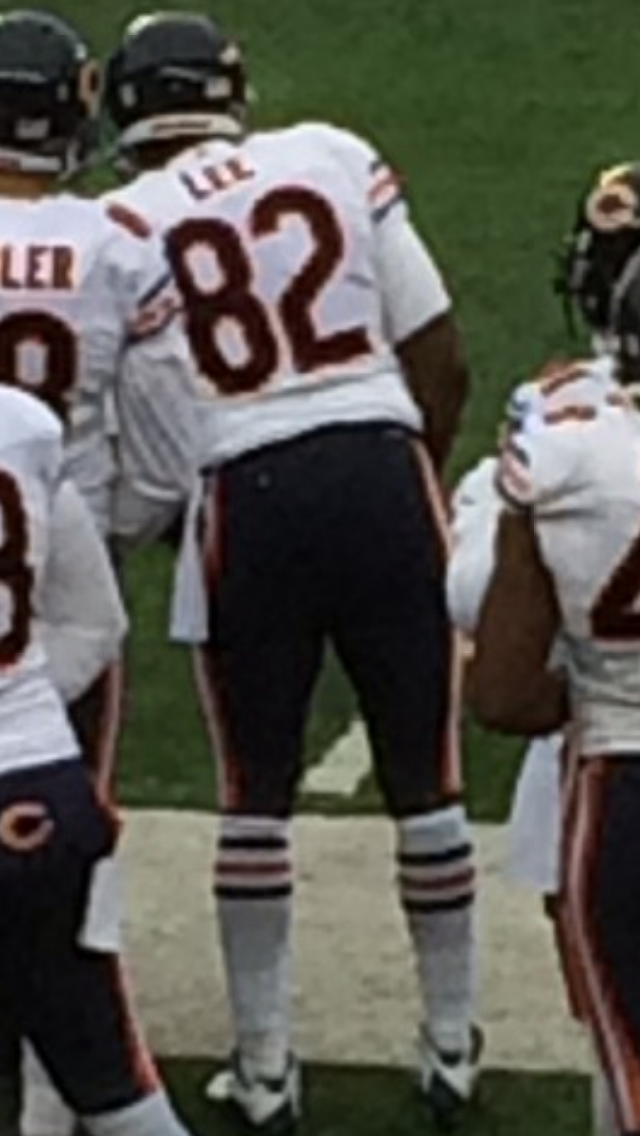
- Lee with the Chicago Bears in 2015

No. 86, 82, 88
- Position: Tight end

Personal information
- Born: January 16, 1992 (age 34); Baltimore, Maryland, U.S.
- Listed height: 6 ft 4 in (1.93 m)
- Listed weight: 255 lb (116 kg)

Career information
- High school: Western Tech (Catonsville, Maryland)
- College: Bowie State
- NFL draft: 2015: undrafted

Career history
- Houston Texans (2015)*; Chicago Bears (2015); Detroit Lions (2016); Buffalo Bills (2017–2018); DC Defenders (2020); Atlanta Falcons (2020)*; Detroit Lions (2020)*
- * Offseason or practice squad member only

Career NFL statistics
- Receptions: 2
- Receiving yards: 12
- Stats at Pro Football Reference

Khari Lee (born January 16, 1992) is an American former professional football player who was a tight end in the National Football League (NFL). He played college football for the Bowie State Bulldogs.

== Professional career ==
=== Houston Texans ===
Lee was signed by the Houston Texans as an undrafted free agent in 2015.

He was featured on the Texans' season of Hard Knocks, notable for his impersonation of then head coach Bill O'Brien.

=== Chicago Bears ===
Lee was traded from the Texans to the Chicago Bears for a sixth round pick in the 2017 NFL draft on September 2, 2015. On September 4, 2016, Lee was waived by the Bears.

=== Detroit Lions (first stint) ===
Lee was claimed off waivers by the Detroit Lions on September 6, 2016. He was released by the Lions on November 8, 2016, and was signed to the practice squad. He signed a reserve/future contract with the Lions on January 9, 2017.

On September 2, 2017, Lee was waived by the Lions.

=== Buffalo Bills ===
On September 3, 2017, Lee was claimed off waivers by the Buffalo Bills.

On October 6, 2018, Lee was waived by the Bills.

=== DC Defenders ===
In October 2019, Lee was selected by the DC Defenders of the XFL in the fifth round in the 2020 XFL draft. Despite being best utilized as a blocker during his NFL career, Lee caught all eight of his targets, turning those eight receptions into 91 yards and two touchdowns in the shortened five-game 2020 season.

On March 12, 2020, the XFL canceled the remainder of the 2020 season and allowed its players to sign with NFL teams. Lee was placed on the reserve/other league list on March 25. He had his contract terminated when the league suspended operations on April 10. During his time in the XFL, Pro Football Focus named Lee as its highest graded tight end.

=== Atlanta Falcons ===
On March 25, 2020, Lee signed a one-year deal with the Atlanta Falcons. On September 3, he was released with an injury settlement.

=== Detroit Lions (second stint) ===
On November 4, 2020, Lee was signed to the Detroit Lions practice squad. He was released on November 10.
