= 2023 Howard Bison football team =

American college football season

2023 Howard Bison football

MEAC champion

Celebration Bowl, L 26–30 vs. Florida A&M
- Conference: Mid-Eastern Athletic Conference
- Record: 6–6 (4–1 MEAC)
- Head coach: Larry Scott (4th season)
- Offensive coordinator: Lee Hull (4th season)
- Defensive coordinator: Troy Douglas (4th season)
- Home stadium: William H. Greene Stadium

2023 Mid-Eastern Athletic Conference football standings
	Conf.			Overall
Team	W		L	W		L
Howard +	4	–	1	6	–	6
No. 20 North Carolina Central +^	4	–	1	9	–	3
South Carolina State	3	–	2	5	–	6
Morgan State	3	–	2	4	–	6
Norfolk State	1	–	4	3	–	8
Delaware State	0	–	5	1	–	10
+ – Conference co-champions; ^ – FCS playoff participant; Rankings from STATS Poll

The 2023 Howard Bison football team represented Howard University as a member of the Mid-Eastern Athletic Conference (MEAC) during the 2023 NCAA Division I FCS football season. Led by fourth-year head coach Larry Scott, the Bison finished with an overall record of 6–6 with a mark of 4–1 in conference play, winning the MEAC title outright and an invitation to the Celebration Bowl.

Howard and North Carolina Central finished with identical 4–1 records in conference play for the second consecutive season. However, due to new conference tiebreaker rules and Howard's 50–20 victory over NC Central during the regular season, Howard won the MEAC title outright. Howard was invited to the Celebration Bowl, where they lost 30–26 to SWAC champion Florida A&M.

The team played home games at William H. Greene Stadium in Washington, D.C.

== Schedule ==
Date	Time	Opponent	Site	TV	Result	Attendance
September 1	6:30 p.m.	at Eastern Michigan*	Rynearson Stadium; Ypsilanti, MI	ESPN+	L 23–33	18,065
September 9	7:00 p.m.	Morehouse*	William H. Greene Stadium; Washington, DC	ESPN+	W 65–19	3,098
September 16	3:30 p.m.	Hampton*	Audi Field; Washington, DC (The Real HU)	ESPN+	L 34–35	16,630
September 30	12:00 p.m.	at Robert Morris*	Joe Walton Stadium; Moon Township, PA	ESPN+	W 35–10	2,207
October 7	3:00 p.m.	at Northwestern*	Ryan Field; Evanston, IL	BTN	L 20–23	22,160
October 14	1:00 p.m.	at No. 19 Harvard*	Harvard Stadium; Boston, MA	ESPN+	L 7–48	7,678
October 21	12:00 p.m.	Norfolk State^{†}	William H. Greene Stadium; Washington, DC	ESPNU	W 27–23	7,684
October 28	12:00 p.m.	at Delaware State	Alumni Stadium; Dover, DE	ESPNU	W 17–10	5,386
November 4	3:30 p.m.	at South Carolina State	Oliver C. Dawson Stadium; Orangeburg, SC	ESPN+	L 24–27	22,269
November 11	3:30 p.m.	No. 7 North Carolina Central	William H. Greene Stadium; Washington, DC	ESPNU	W 50–20	4,457
November 18	1:00 p.m.	Morgan State	William H. Greene Stadium; Washington, DC	ESPN+	W 14–7	6,491
December 16	12:00 p.m.	vs. No. 10 Florida A&M	Mercedes-Benz Stadium; Atlanta, GA (Celebration Bowl)	ABC	L 26–30	41,108
*Non-conference game; ^{†}Homecoming; Rankings from STATS Poll released prior to the game; All times are in Eastern time
