= 2023 Norfolk State Spartans football team =

American college football season

2023 Norfolk State Spartans football
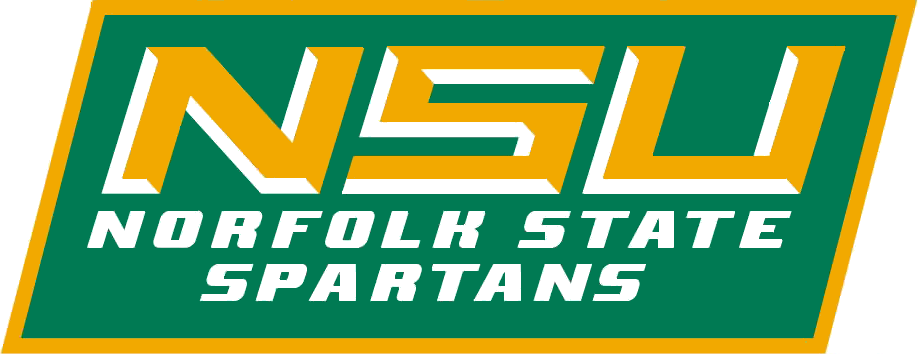
- Conference: Mid-Eastern Athletic Conference
- Record: 3–8 (1–4 MEAC)
- Head coach: Dawson Odums (3rd season)
- Offensive coordinator: Ryan Meyers (2nd season)
- Defensive coordinator: Steve Adams (3rd season)
- Home stadium: William "Dick" Price Stadium

2023 Mid-Eastern Athletic Conference football standings
	Conf.			Overall
Team	W		L	W		L
Howard +	4	–	1	6	–	6
No. 20 North Carolina Central +^	4	–	1	9	–	3
South Carolina State	3	–	2	5	–	6
Morgan State	3	–	2	4	–	6
Norfolk State	1	–	4	3	–	8
Delaware State	0	–	5	1	–	10
+ – Conference co-champions; ^ – FCS playoff participant; Rankings from STATS Poll

The 2023 Norfolk State Spartans football team represented Norfolk State University as a member of the Mid-Eastern Athletic Conference (MEAC) during the 2023 NCAA Division I FCS football season. The Spartans were led by third-year head coach Dawson Odums and played home games at William "Dick" Price Stadium in Norfolk, Virginia. The Norfolk State Spartans football team drew an average home attendance of 15,656 in 2023.

== Schedule ==
Date	Time	Opponent	Site	TV	Result	Attendance
September 2	2:00 p.m.	Virginia State*	William "Dick" Price Stadium; Norfolk, VA	ESPN+	L 24–33	21,640
September 9	6:00 p.m.	at Hampton*	Armstrong Stadium; Hampton, VA (Battle of the Bay)	FloSports	W 31–23	10,021
September 16	2:00 p.m.	at Temple*	Lincoln Financial Field; Philadelphia, PA	ESPN+	L 9–41	10,932
September 23	4:00 p.m.	at Towson*	Johnny Unitas Stadium; Towson, MD	FloSports	W 21–14	2,606
September 30	2:00 p.m.	North Carolina A&T*	William "Dick" Price Stadium; Norfolk, VA	ESPN+	L 26–28	12,894
October 14	6:00 p.m.	at Tennessee State*	Hale Stadium; Nashville, TN	ESPN+	L 17–24	13,975
October 21	12:00 p.m.	at Howard	William H. Greene Stadium; Washington, D.C	ESPNU	L 23–27	7,684
October 28	2:00 p.m.	Morgan State^{†}	William "Dick" Price Stadium; Norfolk, VA	ESPN+	L 28–32	24,976
November 4	2:00 p.m.	at No. 12 North Carolina Central	O'Kelly-Riddick Stadium; Durham, NC	ESPN+	L 24–38	13,626
November 11	12:00 p.m.	at Delaware State	Alumni Stadium; Dover, DE	ESPN+	W 44–21	3,467
November 18	2:00 p.m.	South Carolina State	William "Dick" Price Stadium; Norfolk, VA	ESPN+	L 17–44	3,087
*Non-conference game; ^{†}Homecoming; Rankings from STATS Poll released prior to the game; All times are in Eastern time
