= 2023 South Carolina State Bulldogs football team =

American college football season

2023 South Carolina State Bulldogs football
- Conference: Mid-Eastern Athletic Conference
- Record: 5–6 (3–2 MEAC)
- Head coach: Oliver Pough (22nd season)
- Offensive coordinator: Kevin Magouirk (1st, 6th overall season)
- Defensive coordinator: Thomas Howard (1st season)
- Home stadium: Oliver C. Dawson Stadium

2023 Mid-Eastern Athletic Conference football standings
	Conf.			Overall
Team	W		L	W		L
Howard +	4	–	1	6	–	6
No. 20 North Carolina Central +^	4	–	1	9	–	3
South Carolina State	3	–	2	5	–	6
Morgan State	3	–	2	4	–	6
Norfolk State	1	–	4	3	–	8
Delaware State	0	–	5	1	–	10
+ – Conference co-champions; ^ – FCS playoff participant; Rankings from STATS Poll

The 2023 South Carolina State Bulldogs football team represented South Carolina State University as a member of the Mid-Eastern Athletic Conference (MEAC) during the 2023 NCAA Division I FCS football season. The Bulldogs were led by head coach Oliver Pough in his 22nd and final season and played their home games at Oliver C. Dawson Stadium in Orangeburg, South Carolina. The South Carolina State Bulldogs football team drew an average home attendance of 10,661 in 2023.

== Schedule ==
Date	Time	Opponent	Site	TV	Result	Attendance
August 26	7:30 p.m.	vs. Jackson State*	Center Parc Stadium; Atlanta, GA (MEAC/SWAC Challenge)	ABC	L 7–37	24,238
September 2	6:00 p.m.	at Charlotte*	Jerry Richardson Stadium; Charlotte, NC	ESPN+	L 3–24	15,622
September 9	1:00 p.m.	at Georgia Tech*	Bobby Dodd Stadium; Atlanta, GA	ACCNX/ESPN+	L 13–48	31,452
September 23	6:00 p.m.	The Citadel*	Oliver C. Dawson Stadium; Orangeburg, SC	ESPN+	W 31–10	9,012
October 7	2:00 p.m.	Virginia–Lynchburg*	Oliver C. Dawson Stadium; Orangeburg, SC	ESPN+	W 56–6	11,484
October 14	1:30 p.m.	Tennessee Tech*	Oliver C. Dawson Stadium; Orangeburg, SC	ESPN+	L 7–28	5,969
October 21	12:00 p.m.	at Delaware State	Alumni Stadium; Dover, DE	ESPN+	W 35–7	6,300
October 26	7:30 p.m.	No. 13 North Carolina Central	O'Kelly–Riddick Stadium; Durham, NC	ESPNU	L 28–62	7,889
November 4	3:30 p.m.	Howard^{†}	Oliver C. Dawson Stadium; Orangeburg, SC	ESPN+	W 27–24	22,269
November 11	12:00 p.m.	Morgan State	Oliver C. Dawson Stadium; Orangeburg, SC	ESPN+	L 17–20	4,569
November 18	2:00 p.m.	at Norfolk State	William "Dick" Price Stadium; Norfolk, VA	ESPN+	W 44–17	3,087
*Non-conference game; ^{†}Homecoming; Rankings from STATS Poll released prior to the game; All times are in Eastern time

== Game summaries ==
=== Jackson State ===
	1	2	3	4	Total
Tigers	7	10	17	3	37
Bulldogs	0	0	0	7	7
