= 2023 North Carolina Central Eagles football team =

American college football season

2023 North Carolina Central Eagles football

NCAA Division I First Round, L 27–49 at Richmond
- Conference: Mid-Eastern Athletic Conference

Ranking
- STATS: No. 16
- FCS Coaches: No. 13
- Record: 9–3 (4–1 MEAC)
- Head coach: Trei Oliver (4th season)
- Offensive coordinator: Matt Leone (3rd season)
- Defensive coordinator: Courtney Coard (2nd season)
- Home stadium: O'Kelly–Riddick Stadium

2023 Mid-Eastern Athletic Conference football standings
	Conf.			Overall
Team	W		L	W		L
Howard +	4	–	1	6	–	6
No. 20 North Carolina Central +^	4	–	1	9	–	3
South Carolina State	3	–	2	5	–	6
Morgan State	3	–	2	4	–	6
Norfolk State	1	–	4	3	–	8
Delaware State	0	–	5	1	–	10
+ – Conference co-champions; ^ – FCS playoff participant; Rankings from STATS Poll

The 2023 North Carolina Central Eagles football team represented North Carolina Central University as a member of the Mid-Eastern Athletic Conference (MEAC) during the 2023 NCAA Division I FCS football season. Led by fourth-year head coach Trei Oliver, the Eagles compiled an overall record of 9–3 with a mark of 4–1. North Carolina Central earned an at-large bid to the NCAA Division I Football Championship playoff, where the Eagles lost in the first round to Richmond. The team played home games at O'Kelly–Riddick Stadium in Durham, North Carolina

== Schedule ==
Date	Time	Opponent	Rank	Site	TV	Result	Attendance
September 2	4:00 p.m.	Winston-Salem State*	No. 19	O'Kelly–Riddick Stadium; Durham, NC	ESPN+	W 47–21	9,330
September 9	7:00 p.m.	at North Carolina A&T*	No. 18	Truist Stadium; Greensboro, NC (rivalry)	FloSports	W 30–16	N/A
September 16	5:00 p.m.	at No. 24 (FBS) UCLA*	No. 17	Rose Bowl Stadium; Pasadena, CA	P12N	L 7–59	38,343
September 23	3:00 p.m.	vs. Mississippi Valley State*	No. 18	Lucas Oil Stadium; Indianapolis, IN (Circle City Classic)		W 45–3	3,650
September 30	4:00 p.m.	Campbell*	No. 15	O'Kelly–Riddick Stadium; Durham, NC	ESPN+	W 49–48 ^{OT}	8,410
October 7	2:00 p.m.	at No. 25 Elon*	No. 14	Rhodes Stadium; Elon, NC	FloSports	W 34–23	5,563
October 19	7:30 p.m.	at Morgan State	No. 16	Hughes Stadium; Baltimore, MD	ESPNU	W 16–10	4,678
October 26	7:30 p.m.	South Carolina State	No. 13	O'Kelly–Riddick Stadium; Durham, NC	ESPNU	W 62–28	7,889
November 4	2:00 p.m.	Norfolk State^{†}	No. 12	O'Kelly–Riddick Stadium; Durham, NC	ESPN+	W 38–24	13,626
November 11	3:30 p.m.	at Howard	No. 7	William H. Greene Stadium; Washington, DC	ESPNU	L 20–50	4,457
November 18	2:00 p.m.	at Delaware State	No. 17	O'Kelly–Riddick Stadium; Durham, NC	ESPN+	W 55–14	6,018
November 25	2:00 p.m.	at No. 22 Richmond*	No. 16	E. Claiborne Robins Stadium; Richmond, VA (NCAA Division I First Round)	ESPN+	L 27–49	4,103
*Non-conference game; ^{†}Homecoming; Rankings from STATS Poll released prior to the game; All times are in Eastern time
