= 1967 All-East football team =

American college football all-star team

The 1967 All-East football team consists of American football players chosen by various selectors as the best players at each position among the Eastern colleges and universities during the 1967 NCAA University Division football season.

== Offense ==
=== Quarterback ===
- Brian Dowling, Yale (AP-1)
- John Cartwright, Navy (AP-2)

=== Halfbacks ===
- Calvin Hill, Yale (AP-1)
- Vic Gatto, Harvard (AP-1)
- Bob Mitchell, Vermont (AP-2)
- Terry Murray, Navy (AP-2)

=== Fullback ===
- Larry Csonka, Syracuse (AP-1)
- Chuck Jarvis, Army (AP-2)

=== Ends ===
- Rob Taylor, Navy (AP-1)
- Ted Kwalick, Penn State (AP-1)
- Terry Young, Army (AP-2)
- Bob Longo, Pittsburgh (AP-2)

=== Tackles ===
- Rich Buzin, Penn State (AP-1)
- Henry Paulson, Dartmouth (AP-1)
- Bruce Eckman, Princeton (AP-2)
- Paul Maczuzak, Bucknell (AP-2)

=== Guards ===
- Mike Donovan, Northeastern (AP-1)
- Al Bersin, Harvard (AP-1)
- Ben Martensen, Penn (AP-2)
- Roy Lawrence, Connecticut (AP-2)

=== Center ===
- Bill Lenkaitis, Penn State (AP-1)
- Fred Morris, Yale (AP-2)

=== Kicker ===
- Nick Kurilko, Army (AP-1)
- Pete Donovan, Dartmouth (AP-2)

== Defense ==
=== Ends ===
- Bill Dow, Navy (AP-1)
- Scott Lewendon, Rutgers (AP-1)
- Randy McElrath, Dartmouth (AP-2)
- Bob Hoffman, Harvard (AP-2)

=== Tackles ===
- Ray Norton, Boston University (AP-1)
- Dennis Fitzgibbons, Syracuse (AP-1)
- Mike McBath, Penn State (AP-2)
- John Sponheimer, Cornell (AP-2)

=== Middle guard ===
- Glenn Grieco, Holy Cross (AP-1)
- Lee Hitchner, Princeton (AP-2)

=== Linebackers ===
- Bud Neswiacherry, Army (AP-1)
- Jim Bevans, Army (AP-1)
- Dennis Onkotz, Penn State (AP-1)
- Jim Cheyunski, Syracuse (AP-2)
- Don Chiofaro, Harvard (AP-2)
- Mike Luzny, Buffalo (AP-2)

=== Backs ===
- Tim Montgomery, Penn State (AP-1)
- Dick Farley, Boston University (AP-1)
- Gordie Rule, Dartmouth (AP-1)
- Tony Kyasky, Syracuse (AP-2)
- Tom Williamson, Harvard (AP-2)
- Bruce Wayne, Princeton (AP-2)

== Key ==
- AP = Associated Press
- UPI = United Press International

== See also ==
- 1967 College Football All-America Team
