= Bill Lenkaitis =

American football player (1946–2016)

No. 51, 67
- Positions: Center, guard

Personal information
- Born: June 30, 1946; Cleveland, Ohio, U.S.
- Died: August 27, 2016 (aged 70); Canton, Massachusetts, U.S.
- Listed height: 6 ft 4 in (1.93 m)
- Listed weight: 255 lb (116 kg)

Career information
- High school: South (Youngstown, Ohio)
- College: Penn State (1964-1967)
- NFL draft: 1968: 2nd round, 43rd overall pick

Career history
- San Diego Chargers (1968–1970); New England Patriots (1971–1981)

Awards and highlights
- First-team All-East (1967)

Career NFL/AFL statistics
- Games played: 180
- Games started: 135
- Fumble recoveries: 4
- Stats at Pro Football Reference

William Edward Lenkaitis (June 30, 1946 – August 27, 2016) was an American professional football player who was a center and guard for 14 seasons in the American Football League (AFL) and National Football League (NFL). He played college football for the Penn State Nittany Lions. Lenkaitis played in the AFL with San Diego Chargers in 1968 and 1969, and spent a season with them in the NFL in 1970. He then played 11 seasons (1971–1981) with the NFL's New England Patriots. He was a member of the New England Patriots 1970s All-Decade Team.

Lenkaitis attended Penn State University, and subsequently earned his dental degree in the offseason from the University of Tennessee. He was the Patriots' dentist for many years, both when he was playing and beyond. At the time he was the only practicing dentist in the league.

Lenkaitis died of brain cancer in 2016 and later diagnosed with chronic traumatic encephalopathy after death. He is one of at least 345 NFL players to be diagnosed after death with this disease, which is caused by repeated hits to the head.

== See also ==
- Other American Football League players
- List of AFL/NFL players with chronic traumatic encephalopathy
