= Tom Dowling (American football) =

American football player and coach (1940–2018)

Biographical details
- Born: March 8, 1940; Springfield, Kentucky, U.S.
- Died: January 7, 2018 (aged 77); Georgetown, Kentucky, U.S.

Playing career
- 1958–1961: Georgetown (KY)
- Position: Offensive lineman

Coaching career (HC unless noted)
- 1962–1963: Newport HS (KY) (assistant)
- 1964–1968: Glen Este HS (OH)
- 1969–1972: Georgetown (KY) (assistant)
- 1973–1976: Georgetown (KY)
- 1977–1983: Liberty Baptist
- 1985–1995: Cumberland (KY)

Administrative career (AD unless noted)
- 1981–1983: Liberty
- 1995–2002: MSC (commissioner)

Head coaching record
- Overall: 111–107–4 (college)
- Tournaments: 0–1 (NAIA D-II playoffs)

Accomplishments and honors

Championships
- 2 MSC (1987–1988)

Thomas Walter Dowling (March 8, 1940 – January 7, 2018) was an American college football coach and athletics administrator. He served as the head football coach at Georgetown College in Georgetown, Kentucky from 1973 to 1976, Liberty Baptist College—now known as Liberty University—in Lynchburg, Virginia from 1977 to 1983, and Cumberland College—now known as the University of the Cumberlands—in Williamsburg, Kentucky from 1995 to 2002, compiling a career head coaching record of 111–107–4. Dowling was the commissioner of the Mid-South Conference (MSC) from 1995 to 2002.

A graduate of Georgetown College, Dowling coached for over 30 years on the collegiate level. His coaching tree includes Mike Ayers of Wofford College. Both Ayers' son, Travis Dowling, and his grandson, Ezra Dowling, are named for Dowling.

== Playing career ==
Dowling played football at Georgetown College, serving as co-captain of the 1960 team. He also won the Kentucky Intercollegiate Athletic Conference (KIAC) championship in the shot put while competing for the track team.

== Coaching career ==
Dowling began his collegiate coaching career as an assistant at his alma mater, Georgetown College. After four seasons as Georgetown's head football coach, he became the third head football coach at Liberty Baptist College—now known as Liberty University. He led the Liberty Flames in their transition from National Association of Intercollegiate Athletics (NAIA) to NCAA Division II competition in 1981. In February 1981, he succeeded Terry Don Phillips as the school's athletic director.

After Liberty, he moved on to start the football program at Cumberland College—now known as the University of the Cumberlands—Williamsburg, Kentucky.

== Later life ==
Dowling later served as commissioner of the Mid-South Conference (MSC) from 1995 to 2002. He died of pancreatic cancer, on January 7, 2018.

== Head coaching record ==
=== College ===
Year	Team	Overall	Conference	Standing	Bowl/playoffs	NAIA^{#}
Georgetown Tigers (NAIA Division II independent) (1973–1976)
1973	Georgetown	3–6				
1974	Georgetown	7–2				
1975	Georgetown	6–4				18
1976	Georgetown	7–2–1				11
Georgetown:		23–14–1				
Liberty Baptist Flames (NAIA Division I independent) (1977–1983)
1977	Liberty Baptist	3–7				
1978	Liberty Baptist	4–5–1				
1979	Liberty Baptist	9–1–1				
1980	Liberty Baptist	7–3				
1981	Liberty Baptist	1–9				
1982	Liberty Baptist	7–4				19
1983	Liberty Baptist	2–9				
Liberty Baptist:		33–38–2				
Cumberland Indians (NAIA Division II independent) (1985–1986)
1985	Cumberland	1–9				
1986	Cumberland	3–7				
Cumberland Indians (Mid-South Conference) (1985–1987)
1987	Cumberland	7–3		T–1st		18
1988	Cumberland	10–1	5–0	1st	L NAIA Division II First Round	7
1989	Cumberland	7–3	5–1	2nd		
1990	Cumberland	7–2–1	4–1	2nd		
1991	Cumberland	4–5	3–3	T–3rd		
1992	Cumberland	3–7	1–4	5th		
1993	Cumberland	2–9	2–3	T–3rd		
1994	Cumberland	5–5	1–4	T–5th		
1995	Cumberland	6–4	5–3	4th		
Cumberland:		55–55–1				
Total:		111–107–4				
National championship Conference title Conference division title or championship game berth
