= Fan the Flames! =

"Fan the Flames!" is Liberty University's fight song. It was written in 1989 by Dr. John Hugo, the Chairman of the Department of Music and Humanities.

The fight song is played by Liberty's marching band, "The Spirit of the Mountain", at home football games after the home team scores points. After a victory, the Liberty Flames football team sings the song to the fans on the student side grandstands.

== Lyrics ==
Fan the Flames! Fan the Flames!
Fan the Flames of Liberty!
Fan the Flames! Fan the Flames!
Fan the Flames of Victory!
Fan the Flames and be true
To the Red, White and Navy Blue
Let the fire in your name set the spirit aflame
Win a vict'ry for ol' LU!
