= Bulldogs Stadium =

Football stadium in Bowie, Maryland

Coordinates: 39°1′19″N 76°45′18″W

Bulldog Stadium
- Location: Loop Road; Bowie, MD 20715
- Owner: Bowie State University
- Capacity: 2,964
- Surface: Turf

Construction
- Opened: 1958
- Renovated: 2015

Tenants
- Bowie State Bulldogs football

Bulldogs Stadium is an American football stadium in Bowie, Maryland. The stadium opened in 1958, and serves at the home of the Bowie State University Bulldogs college football team. The stadium's capacity is 2,964. The school added turf and a new fieldhouse in 2015.
