= Garrison Stadium =

Stadium in Murfreesboro, North Carolina

Coordinates: 36.434037°N 77.098457°W

- Interactive map of Garrison Stadium
- Full name: Garrison Stadium
- Location: Murfreesboro, North Carolina
- Owner: Chowan University
- Capacity: 5,000

Tenant
- Chowan Hawks

Garrison Stadium is a 5,000-seat college football stadium located in Murfreesboro, North Carolina. The stadium has been the home of the Hawks football team of Chowan University since the sixties. Beginning with the 2008 athletic year, the Hawks will compete in the National Collegiate Athletic Association (NCAA) Division II Central Intercollegiate Athletic Association (CIAA) as a football-only member.

Improvements to the stadium took place in July 2007 which included new lights, perimeter fencing and upgrades to the grass field.
