= Lee Royer =

American football player and coach

Biographical details
- Born: c. 1934; Baltimore, Maryland, U.S.
- Died: December 20, 1973 (aged 39) near Evergreen, Conecuh County, Alabama, U.S.

Playing career
- 1953–1956: West Chester
- Positions: Fullback, linebacker

Coaching career (HC unless noted)
- 1959: Chester HS (PA) (assistant)
- 1960–1961: Pennsylvania Military (line)
- 1962–1963: Pennsylvania Military
- 1964: Connecticut (assistant)
- 1965–1966: Boston College (DB/LB)
- 1967: VPI (DB)
- 1968–1970: Maryland (DB)
- 1971–1972: Navy (assistant)
- 1973: Lynchburg Baptist

Harold Lee "Rock" Royer (c. 1934 – November 20, 1973) was an American football coach best known for his role as the father of Liberty University football. He was the school's first ever head coach before dying in a plane crash while caught up in tornadic winds in his Cherokee 6 on November 20, 1973. He also was a noted Baptist evangelist and was known in collegiate football circles as "Coach Born Again".

== Coaching career ==
Royer left the United States Naval Academy, where he had served as defensive coordinator, to start up the football program at Lynchburg Baptist College, now called Liberty University. He served as the school's first head coach leading the Flames to a 3–3 record including three straight victories to end the inaugural season. He also served as an assistant coach at Maryland and he spent two seasons early in his career as head coach at Pennsylvania Military College, now called Widener University.

== Head coaching record ==
Year	Team	Overall	Conference	Standing	Bowl/playoffs
Pennsylvania Military Cadets (Middle Atlantic Conference) (1962–1963)
1962	Pennsylvania Military	5–5	5–4	5th (Southern College)	
1963	Pennsylvania Military	3–6	3–5	7th (Southern College)	
Widener:		8–11	8–9		
Lynchburg Baptist Flames (NAIA independent) (1973)
1973	Lynchburg Baptist	3–3			
Lynchburg Baptist:		3–3			
Total:		11–14			
