= W. B. Adams Stadium =

Coordinates: 36.931867°N 80.023293°W

W. B. Adams Stadium is a 5,500-seat stadium in Ferrum, Virginia where it serves as home to the Ferrum College football, field hockey and lacrosse teams. The stadium was completed in 1960 and is on a complex with a full-sized practice field.
