= Bowie State Bulldogs =

- University: Bowie State University
- Conference: CIAA (primary)
- NCAA: Division II
- Athletic director: Clyde Doughty, Jr.
- Location: Bowie, Maryland
- Varsity teams: 11 (4 men's, 7 women's)
- Football stadium: Bulldogs Stadium
- Basketball arena: A. C. Jordan Arena
- Softball stadium: Bulldogs Field
- Aquatics center: Leonidas S. James Physical Education Complex
- Mascot: Butch the Bulldog
- Nickname: Bulldogs
- Colors: Black and gold
- Website: bsubulldogs.com
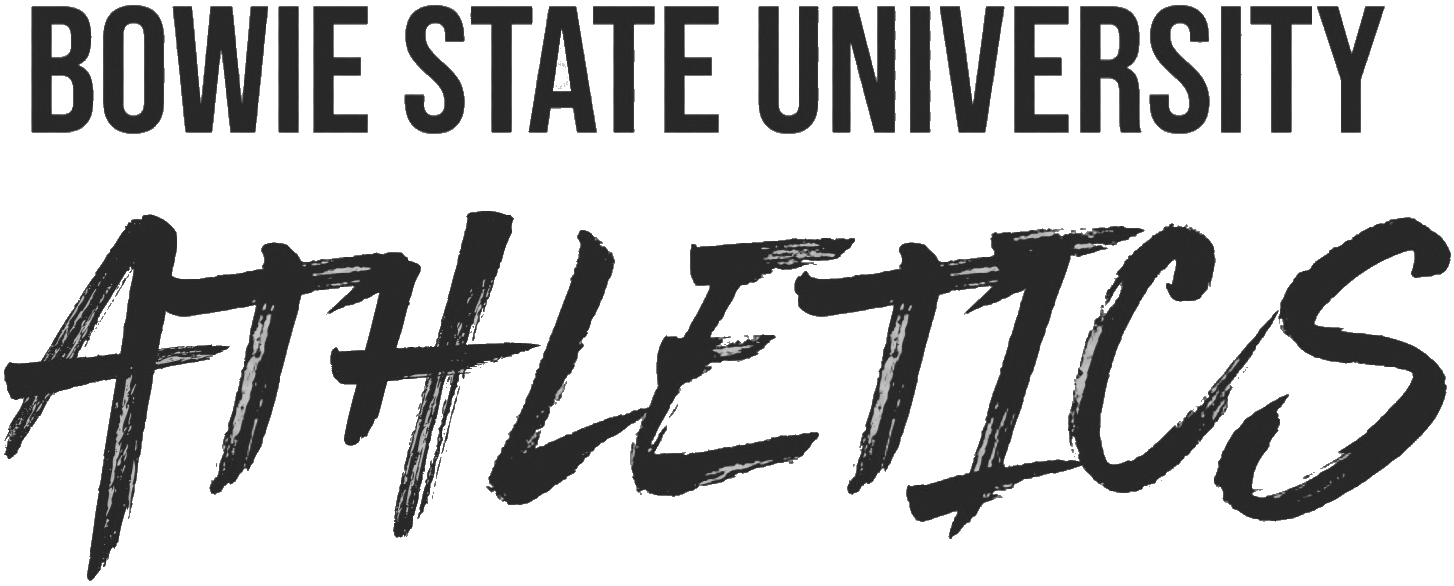

The Bowie State Bulldogs are the athletic teams that represent Bowie State University, located in Bowie, Maryland, in intercollegiate sports at the Division II level of the National Collegiate Athletic Association (NCAA), primarily competing in the Central Intercollegiate Athletic Association since the 1979–80 academic year.

Bowie State competes in thirteen intercollegiate varsity sports. Men's sports include basketball, cross country, football, and track and field (indoor and outdoor); while women's sports include basketball, bowling, cross country, softball, tennis, track and field (indoor and outdoor), and volleyball.

== Varsity teams ==
Men's sports	Women's sports
Basketball	Basketball
Cross country	Bowling
Football	Cross country
Track and field^{†}	Softball
	Tennis
	Track and field^{†}
	Volleyball
† – Track and field includes both indoor and outdoor

== Notable alumni ==
=== Football ===
- Henry Frazier III
- Delano Johnson
- Khari Lee
- Isaac Redman
- Damon Wilson

=== Men's basketball ===
- Kevin Broadus
- Dalonte Hill
