= City Stadium (Lynchburg) =

Sports venue in Lynchburg, Virginia, US

Coordinates: 37°23′36″N 79°10′2″W

Lynchburg City Stadium
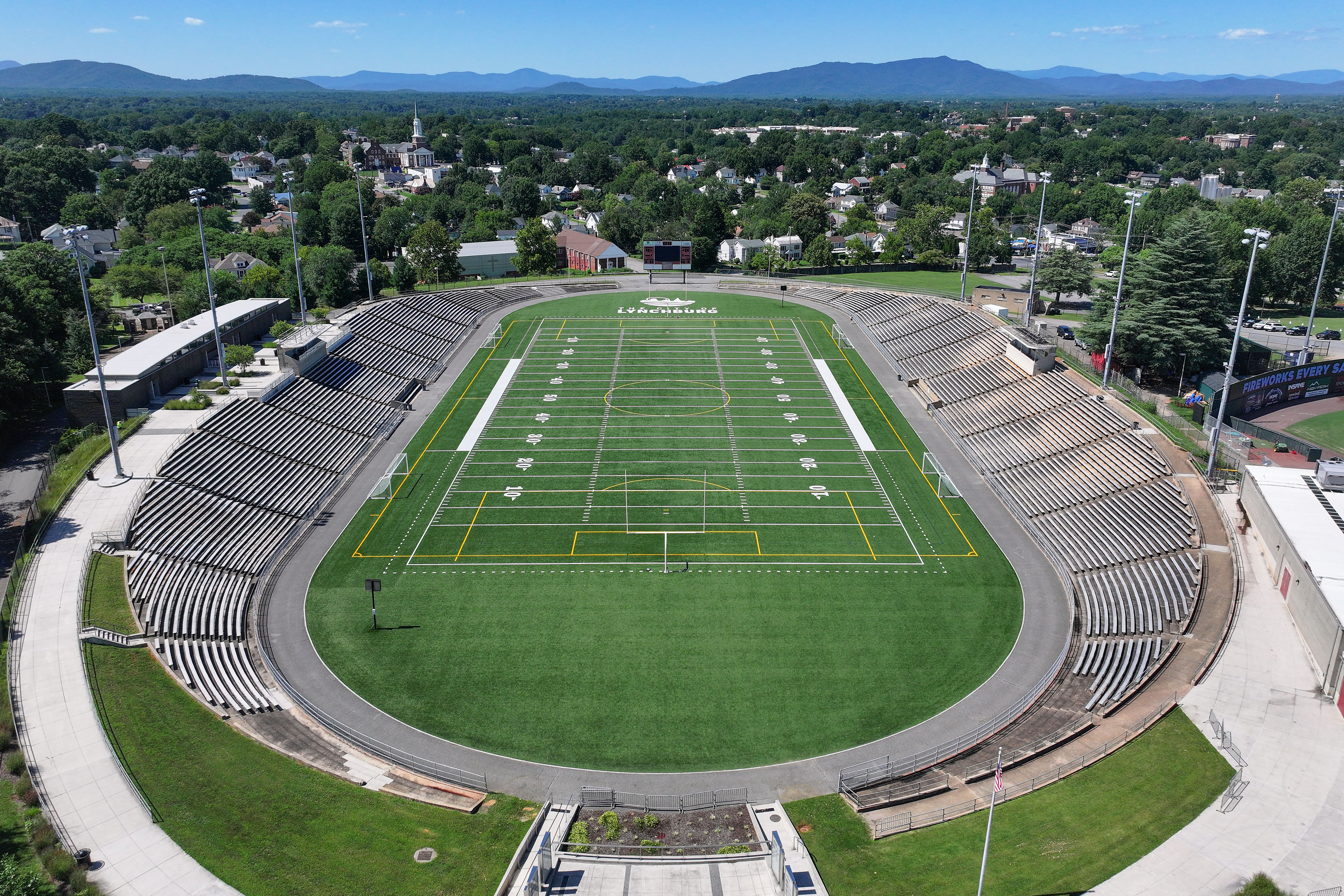
- Interactive map of Lynchburg City Stadium
- Location: 3176 Fort Avenue; Lynchburg, Virginia 24501
- Owner: City of Lynchburg
- Capacity: 15,000
- Surface: Grass (1939–2014); AstroTurf Q Series (2014–present)

Construction
- Groundbreaking: 1938
- Opened: 1939
- Renovated: 2014–2016

Tenants
- Lynchburg City Public Schools (1939–present); Liberty Flames (NCAA) (1973–1989)

Lynchburg City Stadium is a sports venue located in Lynchburg, Virginia, and is home to the Lynchburg City Schools athletic programs mainly for football. City Stadium was built in 1939 along with the baseball stadium Bank of the James Stadium. The Liberty Flames football program called the place home for 16 seasons until 1989, when the program moved back on campus to Williams Stadium.

Over the years the stadium has been untouched, which left the stadium in disrepair. In 2014, the city decided to renovate the aging stadium, starting by replacing the natural grass with artificial turf. Other upgrades to the stadium included the press box, scoreboards, bleachers, PA system and other amenities. The renovations were slated to be completed in August 2016. The stadium work completed in time for fall football in September 2016.
