= Liberty Flames football =

Football team representing Liberty University

2026 Liberty Flames football team
- First season: 1973; 53 years ago
- Athletic director: Ian McCaw
- Head coach: Jamey Chadwell; 4th season, 28–14 (.667)
- Location: Lynchburg, Virginia
- Stadium: Williams Stadium (capacity: 25,000)
- NCAA division: Division I FBS
- Conference: Conference USA
- Colors: Red, White, Navy Blue, and Light Blue
- All-time record: 314–266–4 (.541)
- Bowl record: 3–3 (.500)

Conference championships
- Big South: 2007, 2008, 2009, 2010, 2012, 2013, 2014, 2016 C-USA: 2023
- Rivalries: James Madison (rivalry); Coastal Carolina (rivalry); Old Dominion
- Fight song: Fan the Flames!
- Mascot: Sparky Flames
- Marching band: The Spirit of the Mountain
- Outfitter: Nike
- Alma Mater: Champions Arise
- Website: libertyflames.com

The Liberty Flames football program represents Liberty University, a private Christian university located in Lynchburg, Virginia, in college football. The Flames compete in the NCAA Division I Football Bowl Subdivision (FBS) as a member of Conference USA. The program, which previously competed in the Football Championship Subdivision (FCS), announced it would start a transition to the top level of NCAA football in July 2017. The Flames became a provisional FBS member in 2018, and became a full FBS member with bowl eligibility in 2019. In 2020, Liberty entered the rankings in the AP Poll at 25 for the first time in program history.

In 2021, Liberty University announced the Flames would become full members of Conference USA effective for the 2023 football season.

== History ==
In 1971, Jerry Falwell and Elmer L. Towns established a private Christian school in Lynchburg Baptist College. Falwell stated a plan to “have our athletic program comparable to USC, to Notre Dame, to Alabama, to anybody in time,”, with the football team beginning play in 1973. They played in the National Association of Intercollegiate Athletics until 1980 before moving onto NCAA Division II for seven years. They played in Division I-AA from 1988 to 2017. Fred Banks was the first Liberty player to be drafted in the NFL in 1985. The Flames had their practice facility on Treasure Island near Riverside Park until the flood of November 6, 1985, which devastated the facility. They moved their football operations to campus and, in 1989, to the newly constructed Williams Stadium there.

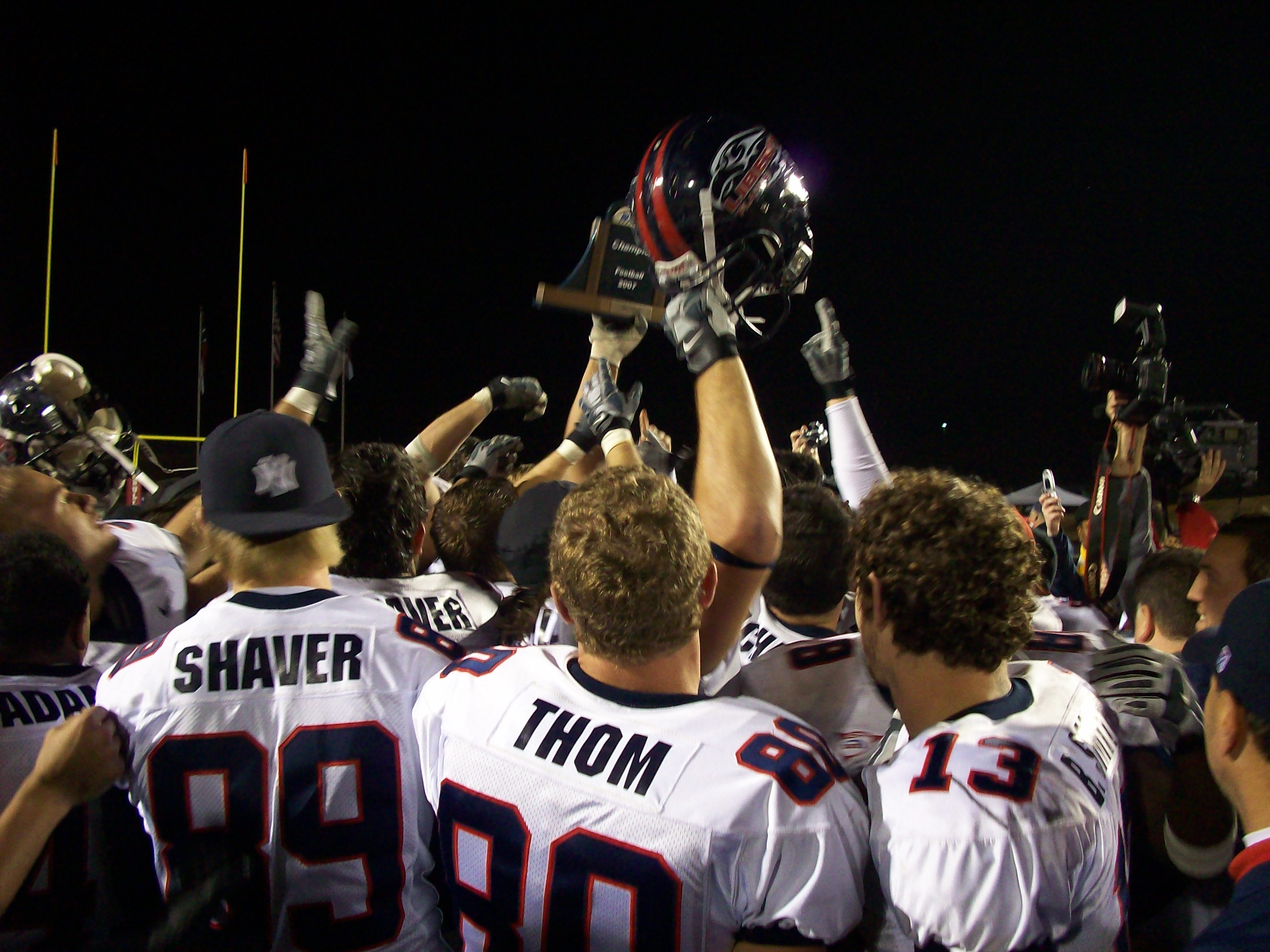
Liberty celebrates first Big South title 2007.

=== Danny Rocco era (2006–2011) ===
In 2007, the Flames captured their first Big South Conference Football championship with a 31–0 victory over Gardner-Webb. The Flames capped off their second year under head coach Danny Rocco with an 8–3 record and an unblemished 4–0 Big South record to claim the title.

In 2008, Liberty ran its unbeaten Big South streak to 11-straight games, finishing back-to-back conference championship seasons with a 30–10 victory over Gardner-Webb. The Flames finished with a 10–2 record on the year and finished the conference slate unbeaten at 5–0. The Flames to become the first team in Big South history to win five conference games in a season and joined Gardner-Webb as the only two teams to post consecutive unbeaten seasons. Liberty finished ranked 15th in the FCS Coaches Poll and 14th in the Sports Network Poll.

Undefeated in Big South play for 2009, the Flames just needed to capture a win over Stony Brook in the season finale to secure a 3rd straight Big South Conference Championship. Stony Brook who had only lost one game in Big South play (a 30–27 overtime loss to Charleston Southern the previous week) for 2009 could claim half of the Big South Championship with a win over Liberty. The Seawolves won the game 36–33 to share the 2009 Big South Championship with the Flames.

Liberty again became conference co-champions again in 2010. Coastal beat Liberty for the first time since 2006 then the Flames bounced back the next week to secure a win over Stony Brook and a share of the conference championship (three-way tie with Coastal Carolina and Stony Brook).

After the 2011 season, Rocco left Liberty for the head coaching job at Richmond.

=== Turner Gill era (2012–2018) ===
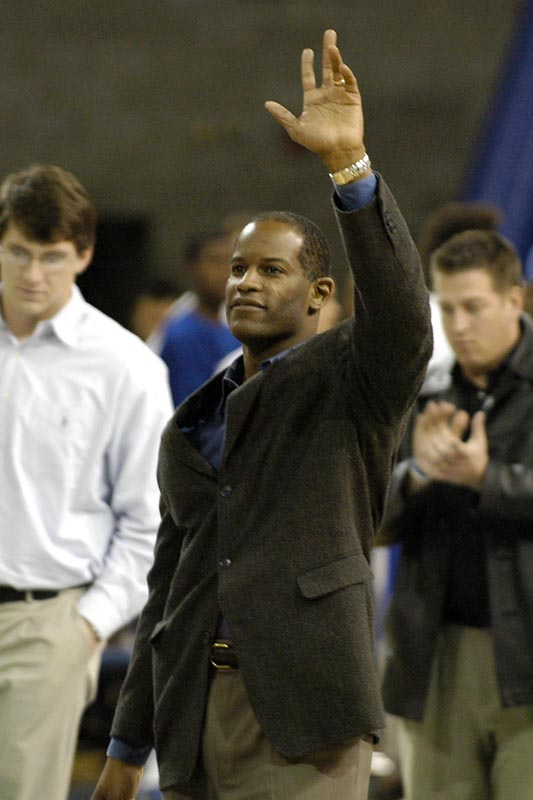
Former Flames coach Turner Gill

Liberty became the conference co-champion for the third time in 2012. After starting off 2–0 in conference play, Liberty traveled to Coastal Carolina, where they lost to the Chanticleers 36–12, bringing their overall record to 3–5. Liberty would then play then ninth ranked Stony Brook, beating them 28–14, also extending their at home conference win streak which dates back to 2006. In order to win a share at the Big South title, they would have to beat the Virginia Military Institute Keydets. Liberty won the game 33–14, and won a share of the title along with Stony Brook and Coastal Carolina with a record of 6–5 (5–1 in conference play).

The 2013 Flames shared the conference championship for a second consecutive year in 2013. Liberty opened up conference play at home against Coastal Carolina, where they let a 19-point lead slip away in the second half as the Chanticleers rallied to win in double overtime, 55–52. The Flames would rebound with a shutout victory at Gardner-Webb to mark the first shutout in Turner Gill's eight seasons as a head coach. After victories at home over VMI and Presbyterian, the Flames captured a share of the Big South title with a 56–14 victory at Charleston Southern who has previously beaten Coastal Carolina. Liberty shared the title with Coastal Carolina, each with identical 4–1 conference marks, though Coastal Carolina received the automatic bid to the FCS playoffs.

Liberty became the conference co-champion for the third consecutive year in 2014. Liberty started Big South Conference play against Gardner-Webb with a 34–0 shutout victory. After three consecutive conference victories, the Flames fell at home to Charleston Southern, 38–36. The loss to Charleston Southern would be Liberty's only loss in Big South play. The Flames rebounded with a 15–14 win over rival Coastal Carolina (ranked No. 1 in the FCS polls at the time), and Liberty clinched a share of the Big South Conference championship. Liberty also earned its first ever FCS playoff berth in school history. Liberty defeated James Madison in the first round of the playoffs, 26–21, before losing to Villanova in the second round, 29–22.

Liberty earned a conference co-championship again in 2016, marking their eighth conference championship. They finished the season 6–5, 4–1 in Big South play to share the conference championship with Charleston Southern. Despite the conference title, the Flames were not invited to the FCS playoffs.

Citing the need to care for his wife, Gill announced his retirement from coaching after the 2018 season.

=== Hugh Freeze era (2019–2022) ===
Seventeen months after resigning from Ole Miss Rebels football, Hugh Freeze was named as Liberty's ninth head coach on December 7, 2018.

For the 2019 season, the Liberty Flames would finish 8–5. They would make and win their first bowl game as an FBS program. In 2020, after a 6–0 start, Liberty made it in the AP Top 25 Poll for the first time in their program history, making it at No. 25. Liberty would go on to finish 10–1 in 2020 and finish the season ranked 17th in the AP Top 25 Poll. Freeze departed Liberty on November 28, 2022, to be the head coach at Auburn University after a few weeks of negotiations, discussions, and rumors.

=== Jamey Chadwell era (2023–present) ===
In Jamey Chadwell's first season as the Flames' head coach, he led Liberty to an undefeated regular season and a Conference USA Championship over New Mexico State in Liberty's first season in Conference USA. Following the Championship win, Liberty got the Group of Five New Year's Six Bowl Bid. On January 1, 2024, the Flames lost 45-6 to the Oregon Ducks in the Fiesta Bowl, their first major bowl appearance in school history. The following season, the Flames under Chadwell finished 8-4 and received an invitation to the Bahamas Bowl vs Buffalo.

In 2025, the Flames experienced significant roster turnover through the transfer portal. The Flames would finish the season with a record of 4-8, and conference record of 3-5.

== Conference affiliations ==
- No classification (1973–1975)
- NAIA Division I independent (1976–1983)
- NCAA Division II independent (1984–1987)
- NCAA Division I-AA independent (1988–2001)
- Big South Conference (2002–2017)
- NCAA Division I FBS independent (2018–2022)
- Conference USA (2023–present)

== Conference championships ==
Liberty has won nine conference championships: eight in the Big South Conference (two outright and six shared) and one in Conference USA.

Season	Conference	Coach	Overall record	Conference record
2007	Big South Conference	Danny Rocco	8–3	4–0
2008	Big South Conference	Danny Rocco	10–2	5–0
2009†	Big South Conference	Danny Rocco	8–3	5–1
2010†	Big South Conference	Danny Rocco	8–3	5–1
2012†	Big South Conference	Turner Gill	6–5	5–1
2013†	Big South Conference	Turner Gill	8–4	4–1
2014†	Big South Conference	Turner Gill	9–5	4–1
2016†	Big South Conference	Turner Gill	6–5	4–1
2023	Conference USA	Jamey Chadwell	13–1	8–0

† Co-championship

== Bowl games ==
Liberty has participated in six bowl games since joining FBS in 2018, amassing a 3–3 record.

Season	Coach	Bowl	Opponent	Result
2019	Hugh Freeze	Cure Bowl	Georgia Southern	W 23–16
2020	Hugh Freeze	Cure Bowl	Coastal Carolina	W 37–34 ^{OT}
2021	Hugh Freeze	LendingTree Bowl	Eastern Michigan	W 56–20
2022	Josh Aldridge	Boca Raton Bowl	Toledo	L 19–21
2023	Jamey Chadwell	Fiesta Bowl †	Oregon	L 6–45
2024	Jamey Chadwell	Bahamas Bowl	Buffalo	L 7–26

† New Year's Six Bowl game

== Playoff appearances ==
Liberty made one appearance in the I-AA/FCS playoffs between 1989 and 2017, going 1–1.

Year	Round	Opponent	Result
2014	First Round; Second Round	James Madison; Villanova	W 26–21; L 22–29

== Rivalries ==
=== James Madison ===
Liberty maintains a football rivalry with James Madison which began in 1980. The teams played almost every year from 1980 to 1992 and then again from 2000 to 2014. The rivalry is set to renew in 2025, marked by the recent expansion of the game series where the teams are set to play each other through to 2040, marking the longest contracted game series in FBS football. The Dukes have more wins in the rivalry, having won 13 out of 19 games

=== Coastal Carolina ===
Liberty maintains a football rivalry with Coastal Carolina which began in 2003. The teams played every year from 2003 to 2016 and met in the 2020 Cure Bowl. The Flames have more wins in the rivalry, having won 9 out of 16 games.

=== Old Dominion ===
Liberty maintains a football rivalry with Old Dominion which began in 2013. The teams played 5 times from 2013-2024. The rivalry was renewed starting with the 2025 season. The Flames have more wins in the rivalry, having won 4 out of 6 games.

== Head coaches ==
Liberty has had ten head coaches in program history, not including interim coaches.

No.	Tenure	Seasons	Coach	Record	Pct.
1	1973	1	Lee Royer	3–3	.500
2	1974–1976	3	John Cartwright	14–13–1	.518
3	1977–1983	7	Tom Dowling	33–38–2	.466
4	1984–1988	5	Morgan Hout	20–29–1	.410
5	1989–1999	11	Sam Rutigliano	67–53	.558
6	2000–2005	6	Ken Karcher	21–46	.313
7	2006–2011	6	Danny Rocco	47–20	.701
8	2012–2018	7	Turner Gill	47–35	.573
9	2019–2022	4	Hugh Freeze	34–15	.694
10	2023–present	4	Jamey Chadwell	28-14	.667

== Facilities ==
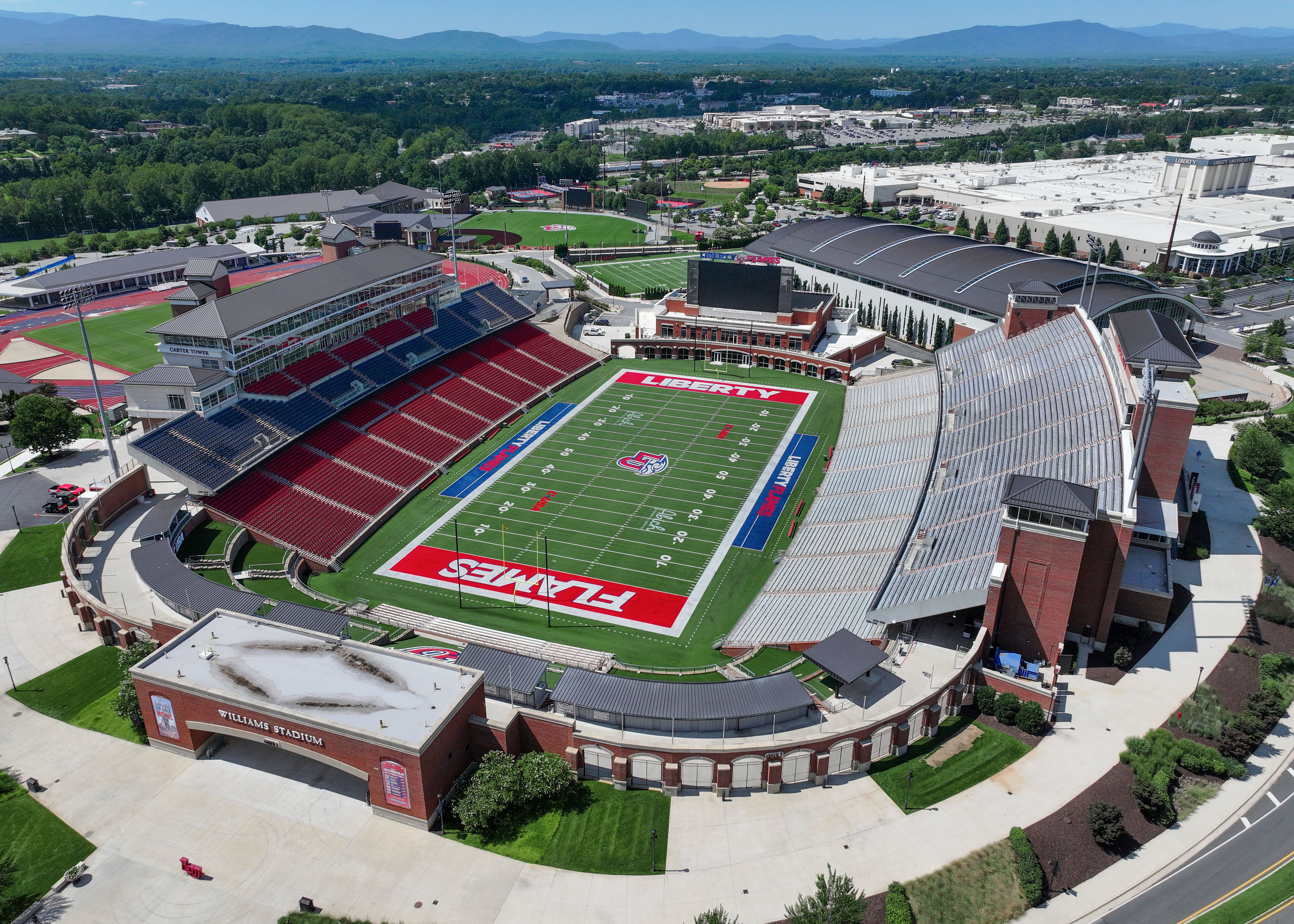
Liberty University Williams Stadium

Liberty plays its home games at Williams Stadium which has a capacity of 25,000.

== Retired numbers ==
Liberty has retired five jerseys in school history.

Liberty Flames retired numbers
No.	Player	Pos.	Tenure	No. ret.	Ref.
23	Rashad Jennings	RB	2006–2008	2020	
71	Jerry Falwell (Note: Falwell never played for the football program, but he founded the university in 1971. As such, a "71" jersey was hung over the press box suite, with the number being retired across all Liberty sports teams.)	—N/a		2006	
83	Kelvin Edwards	WR	1982–1985	2019	
86	Eric Green	TE	1985–1989	2008	
HC	Sam Rutigliano	HC	1989–1999	2008	

== Flames in the NFL ==
First round draft picks

Name	Position	Year	Overall pick	Team
Eric Green	TE	1990	21	Pittsburgh Steelers

=== Active NFL ===
As of August 2026

- Malik Willis, Miami Dolphins
- DeMario Douglas, New England Patriots

=== Notable former players ===
- Fred Banks (WR), Cleveland Browns, Miami Dolphins, Chicago Bears; first Liberty player drafted (1985)
- Charlie Brewer (QB); assistant quarterbacks coach at Syracuse
- Mike Brown (WR), Jacksonville Jaguars and current Wide receivers coach for Notre Dame
- Dwayne Carswell (TE), Denver Broncos; two-time Super Bowl champion (XXXII, XXXIII); Pro Bowler
- Samkon Gado (RB), Green Bay Packers, Houston Texans, Miami Dolphins; Packers rookie single-game rushing record
- Eric Green (TE), Pittsburgh Steelers, Miami Dolphins, Baltimore Ravens, New York Jets; 1990 first-round pick (21st overall), two-time Pro Bowl selection
- Wayne Haddix (CB), New York Giants, Tampa Bay Buccaneers, Cincinnati Bengals; Pro Bowler
- Rashad Jennings (RB), Jacksonville Jaguars, Oakland Raiders, New York Giants
- James McKnight (WR), Seattle Seahawks, Dallas Cowboys, Miami Dolphins, New York Giants
- Richard Shelton (CB), Denver Broncos, Pittsburgh Steelers; NFL scout for the Tennessee Titans
- Johnny Shepherd (RB), Buffalo Bills; CFL Most Outstanding Rookie (1983), Grey Cup champion (1986)
- Donald Smith (CB), Minnesota Vikings, Dallas Cowboys; two-time Grey Cup champion, three-time CFL East All-Star

== Future non-conference opponents ==
Announced schedules as of June 24, 2026.

2026	2027	2028	2029	2030	2031	2032	2033	2034
at James Madison	at Virginia Tech	at Virginia Tech		Ball State	East Tennessee State	James Madison		James Madison
Ball State	Coastal Carolina	VMI	at East Carolina	at Coastal Carolina	at James Madison	at Louisiana	Old Dominion	
at Coastal Carolina	UConn	at Coastal Carolina	Coastal Carolina		Appalachian State			
Gardner–Webb	Delaware State	Louisiana			at Ball State			

2037	2038	2039	2040
at James Madison	James Madison	at James Madison	James Madison
